= Cardinals created by Pius X =

Catholic appointments from 1903 to 1914

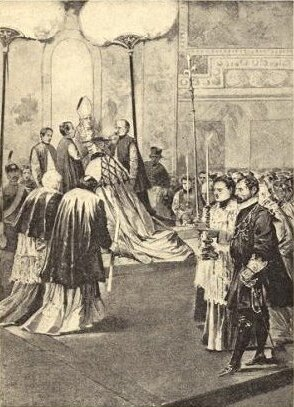
Pope Pius X presiding at his first public consistory

Pope Pius X (r. 1903–1914) created 50 cardinals in seven consistories. Twenty of them were Italians. He created 17 cardinals at four consistories in four years from 1903 to 1907 and then, after several postponements and allowing the membership of the College of Cardinals to fall to 47, created 19 cardinals in 1911, announcing 18 and reserving the name of one, the largest number of cardinals at a single consistory in a century. (Note: Pope Pius VII created 24 cardinals at a consistory in 1801, though the New York Times gives the figure 27, and 31 in a March 1816 consistory, though ten of those names were reserved in pectore.)

Those he made cardinals included Giacomo della Chiesa, who succeeded him as Pope Benedict XV in 1914, Arcoverde, the first from Brazil and the first born in Latin America, and van Rossum, the first from the Netherlands in centuries. He created just one cardinal in pectore.

== 9 November 1903 ==
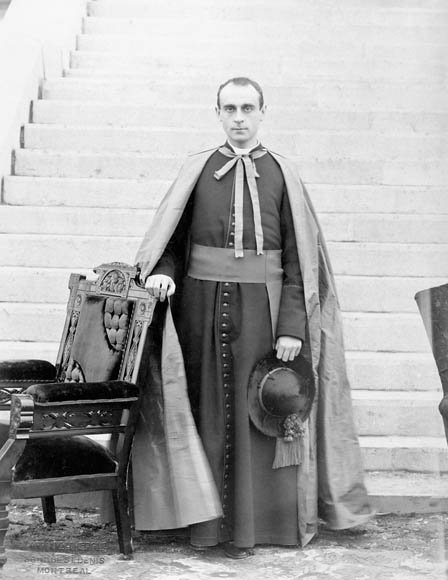
Rafael Merry del Val (1865–1930), made a cardinal on 9 November 1903.

Pope Pius created two cardinals at a secret consistory on 9 November 1903, an Italian and a Spaniard. They and three cardinals created at Pope Leo XIII's last consistory the previous June received their red galeri and their titular church assignments at a public consistory on 12 November. Press accounts differ dramatically in their accounts of Pius' first public consistory. According to The Tablet, Pius used the occasion to launch his campaign to eliminate applause from religious celebrations, Pius was not carried on the sedia gestatoria as was traditional. He arrived on foot wearing a cope and mitre at the end of the procession of prelates, "almost hidden behind the double line of Palatine Guards through which he passed". The New York Times, on the other hand, described the "perfect storm of applause" that greeted the pope "borne high in the sedia gestatoria by eight scarlet-clad sediari, flanked by the great feather fans, giving a mediaeval tone to the scene".

Name	Title when named cardinal	Country
Rafael Merry del Val (1865–1930)	Pro-Secretary of State of Apostolic Secretariat	Spain
Giuseppe Callegari (1841–1906)	Bishop of Padua	Italy

== 11 December 1905 ==
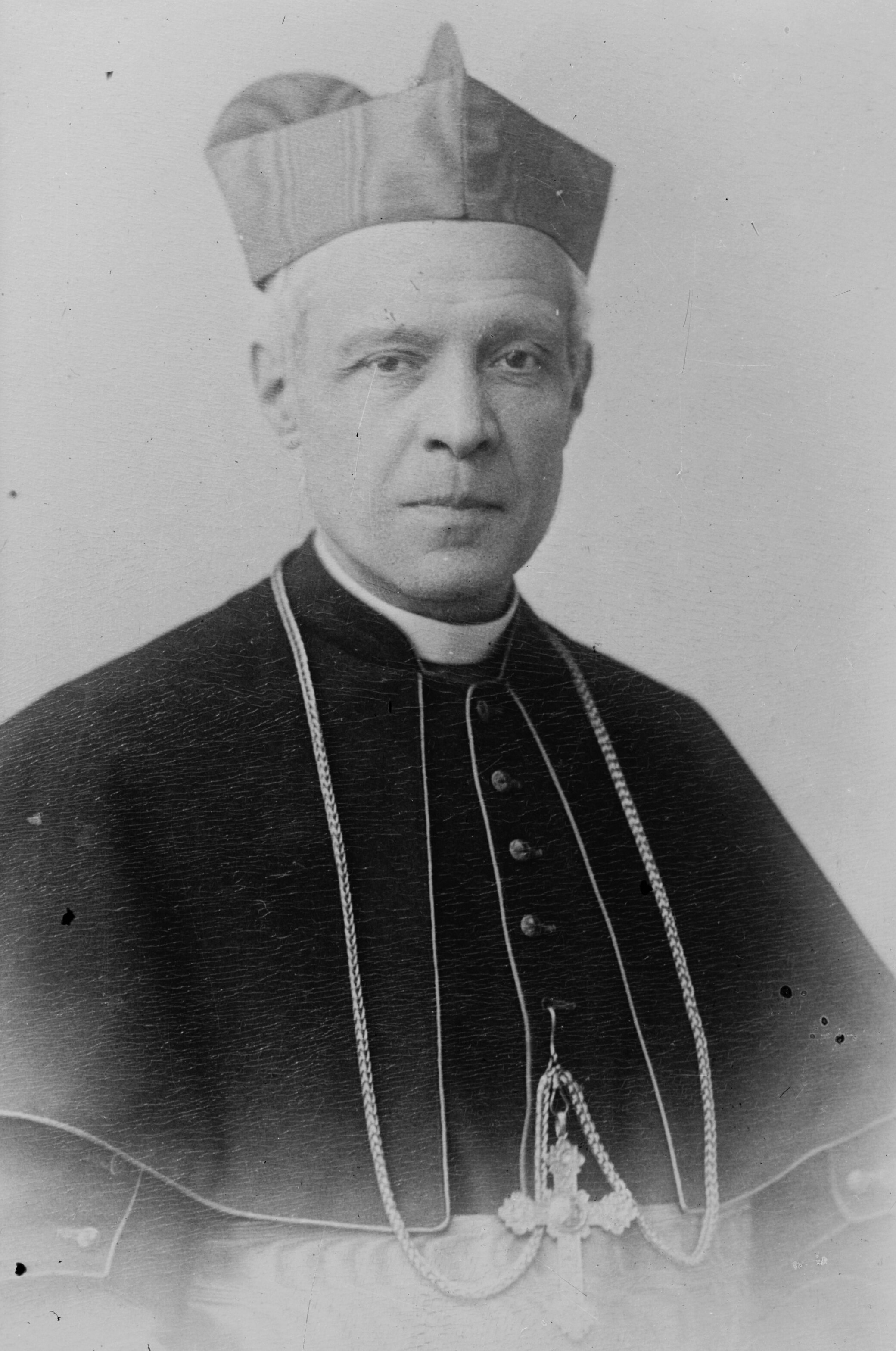
Ottavio Cagiano de Azevedo (1845–1927), made a cardinal on 11 December 1905.

Pius created four cardinals on 11 December 1905, each one from Brazil, Hungary, Italy, and Spain. (Note: For a complete list of the 59 members of the College as of March 1906 see: Keltie, J. Scott (1906). The Statesman's Year-Book: Statistical and Historical Annual of the World. London: Macmillan and Co. pp. 1285–7.) Three belonged to the order of cardinal priests and one (Cagiano de Acevedo) to the order of cardinal deacons. Afterwards, Pius gave Arcoverde and Cagiano de Azevedo their cardinal's rings. (Note: The date on which they received their rings is unspecified. The secret consistory was normally held on a Monday followed by the public consistory on Thursday. The Acta Sanctae Sedis details the events of the secret consistory on 11 December (Monday) and says "afterwards ... in the customary manner" (Postmodum ... more solito).) Customarily, only new cardinals residents in Rome were on hand to participate in the public consistory following immediately upon the secret consistory where they were created cardinals. The presence of Arcoverde is an exception. He was the first Brazilian cardinal and the first cardinal born in Latin America.

Name	Title when named cardinal	Country
József Samassa (1828–1912)	Archbishop of Eger	Austria-Hungary
Marcelo Spinola y Maestre (1835–1906)	Archbishop of Sevilla	Spain
Joaquim Arcoverde de Albuquerque Cavalcanti (1850–1930)	Archbishop of São Sebastião do Rio de Janeiro	Brazil
Ottavio Cagiano de Azevedo (1845–1927)	Prefect of the Prefecture of the Holy Apostolic Palaces	Italy

== 15 April 1907 ==
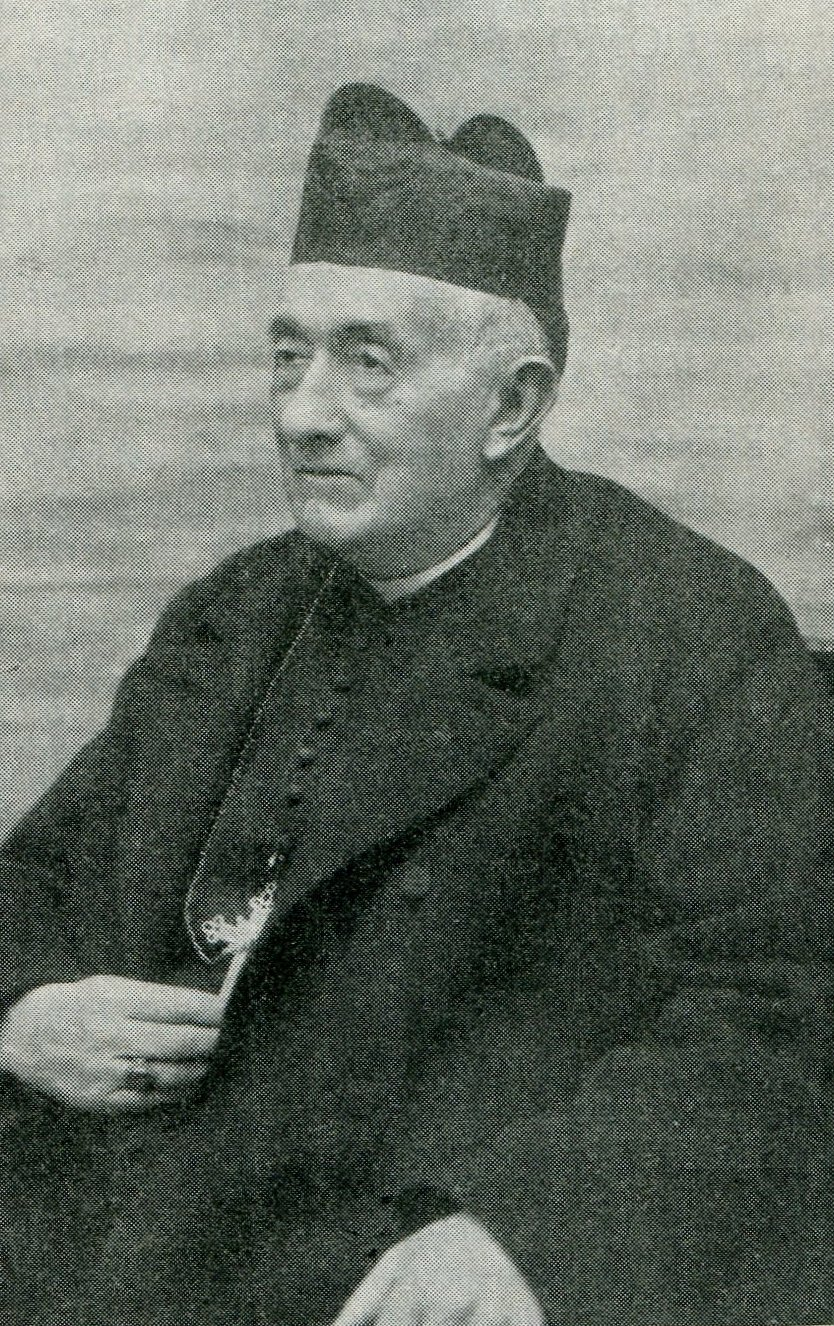
Gregorio Maria Aguirre y Garcia (1835–1913), made a cardinal on 15 April 1907.

Pope Pius created seven cardinals, all cardinal priests, on 15 April 1907. Three days later he gave the cardinal's red galero and titular church assignments to Cavallari, Lorenzelli, Maffi, Lualdi, and Mercier. The other two, both living in Spain, waited for theirs until 19 December 1907. This increased the number of cardinals to 62, of whom 37 were Italian.

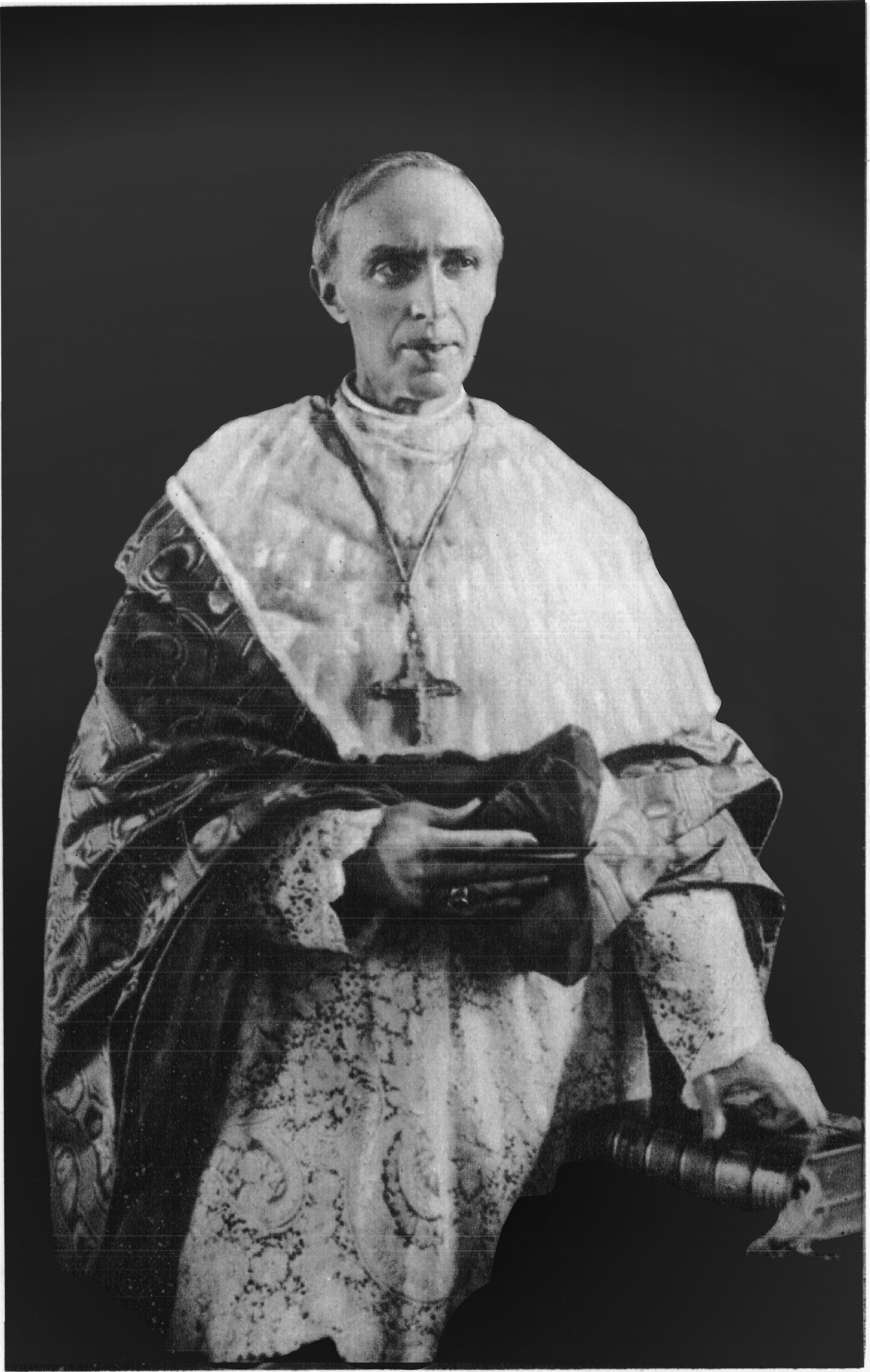
Désiré-Joseph Mercier (1851–1926), made a cardinal on 15 April 1907.

Name	Title when named cardinal	Country
Aristide Cavallari (1849–1914)	Patriarch of Venice	Italy
Gregorio Maria Aguirre y Garcia (1835–1913)	Archbishop of Burgos	Spain
Aristide Rinaldini (1844–1920)	Apostolic Nuncio to Spain	Italy
Benedetto Lorenzelli (1853–1915)	Archbishop of Lucca	Italy
Pietro Maffi (1858–1931)	Archbishop of Pisa	Italy
Alessandro Lualdi (1858–1927)	Archbishop of Palermo	Italy
Désiré-Joseph Mercier (1851–1926)	Archbishop of Mechelen	Belgium

== 16 December 1907 ==
Pope Pius created four cardinals in 1907, two Italian and two French; three were cardinal priests and one (de Lai) a cardinal deacon. They received their titular assignments and red galeri at the public consistory three days later, where Pope Pius spoke at length about the persecution of the Church by the French government.

Name	Title when named cardinal	Country
Pietro Gasparri (1852–1934)	President of the Pontifical Commission for the Codification of Canon Law	Italy
Louis Luçon (1842–1930)	Archbishop of Reims	France
Pierre Andrieu (1849–1935)	Bishop of Marseille	France
Gaetano de Lai (1853–1928)	Secretary of the Sacred Congregation of the Council	Italy

== 27 November 1911 ==
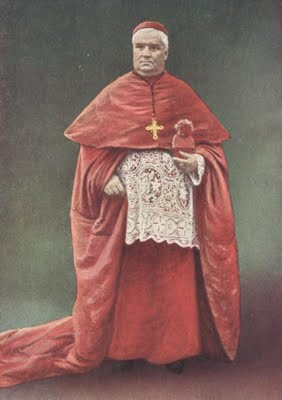
François-Virgile Dubillard (1845–1914), made a cardinal on 27 November 1911.

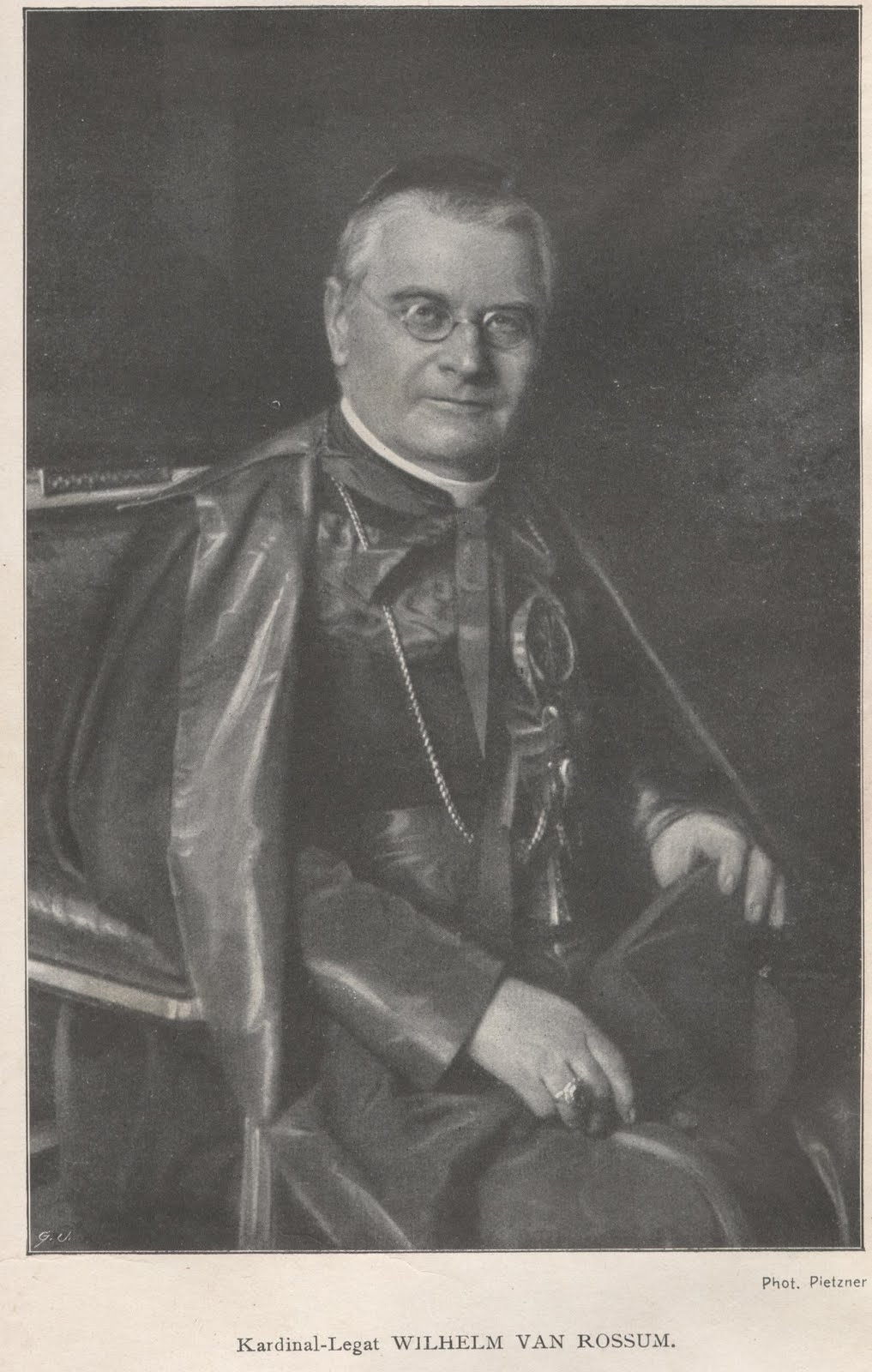
Willem Marinus van Rossum (1854–1932), made a cardinal on 27 November 1911.

Since 1907, several consistories for the creation of cardinals were announced and postponed; by late October 1911 the number of living cardinals had fallen to 47. On the morning of 27 November 1911 at a secret consistory Pius created eighteen new cardinals plus an additional one created in pectore, that is, not identified. That afternoon at a public consistory he announced the names of 18. Five were Italians and four French. Speculation about the one not identified centered on the Patriarch of Lisbon, António Mendes Belo, since the Portuguese Republic established in 1910 had adopted severely anticlerical policies and exiled Mendes Belo from Lisbon for violating its law on the separation of church and state. American representation in the College grew from one to three. Another, Diomede Falconio, was an Italian-born U.S. citizen who had spent most of his career in the United States and Canada. (Note: The United States was a "missionary country" under the jurisdiction of the Congregation for the Propagation of the Faith until Pius X issued the apostolic constitution Sapienti consilio on 29 June 1908.) Van Rossum was the first cardinal from the Netherlands since Willem van Enckevoirt in 1523.

Thirteen of the eighteen new cardinals attended another public consistory on 30 November, where Pius bestowed their cardinals' hats and assigned them their titular churches and deaconries. (Note: Those not present were Cos y Macho (Valladolid), Vico (nuncio to Madrid), Bauer (Olomouc, Moravia), Almaraz y Santos (Seville), and Nagl (Vienna).) He praised the public demonstrations that greeted his appointments in the United States and he again addressed the "weight of persecution" in France.

Name	Title when named cardinal	Country
José Cos y Macho (1838–1919)	Archbishop of Valladolid	Spain
Diomede Falconio (1842–1917)	Apostolic Nuncio to the United States	Italy
Antonio Vico (1847–1929)	Apostolic Nuncio to Spain	Italy
Gennaro Granito Pignatelli di Belmonte (1851–1948)	Apostolic Nuncio to Austria-Hungary	Italy
John Murphy Farley (1842–1918)	Archbishop of New York	United States
Francis Bourne (1861–1935)	Archbishop of Westminster	(United Kingdom of Great Britain and Ireland) Great Britain
Franziskus von Sales Bauer (1841–1915)	Archbishop of Olomouc	Austria-Hungary
Léon-Adolphe Amette (1850–1920)	Archbishop of Paris	France
William Henry O'Connell (1859–1944)	Archbishop of Boston	United States
Enrique Almaraz y Santos (1847–1922)	Archbishop of Sevilla	Spain
François-Virgile Dubillard (1845–1914)	Archbishop of Chambéry	France
Franz Xaver Nagl (1855–1913)	Archbishop of Vienna	Austria-Hungary
François de Rovérié de Cabrières (1830–1921)	Bishop of Montpellier	France
Gaetano Bisleti (1856–1932)	Prefect of the Prefecture of the Holy Apostolic Palaces	Italy
Giovanni Lugari (1846–1914)	Assessor of the Supreme Sacred Congregation of the Holy Office	Italy
Basilio Pompili (1858–1931)	Secretary of the Sacred Congregation of the Council	Italy
Louis Billot (1846–1931) (Note: Resigned from the College in 1927)	Priest of the Society of Jesus	France
Willem Marinus van Rossum (1854–1932)	General Consultor of the Redemptorists	Netherlands

=== Cardinal in pectore ===
Name	Title when named cardinal	Country	Revealed as Cardinal
António Mendes Belo (1842–1929)	Patriarch of Lisbon	Portugal	25 May 1914

== 2 December 1912 ==
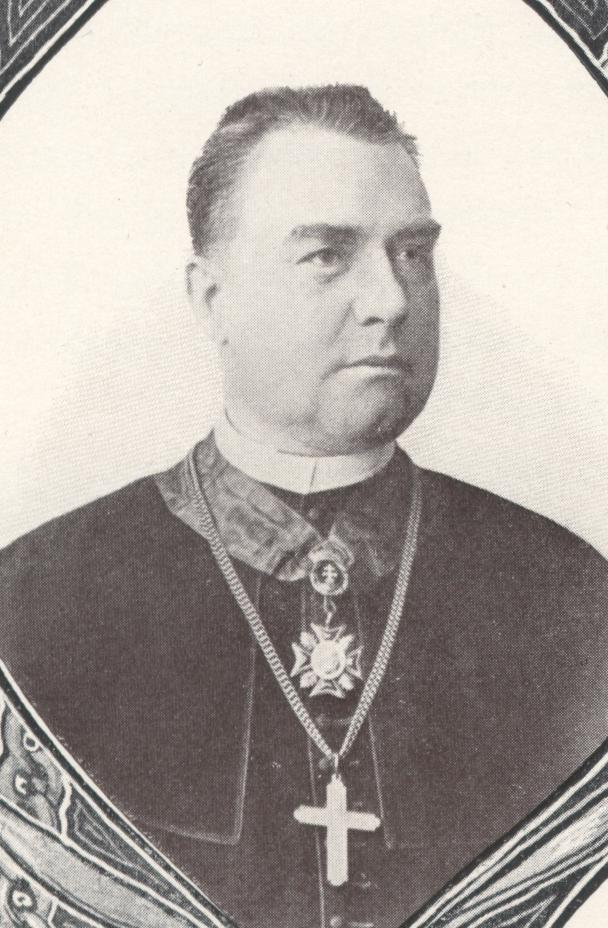
Károly Hornig (1840–1917), made a cardinal on 2 December 1912.

On 2 December 1912, Pope Pius first bestowed cardinals' regalia on several cardinals created at the previous consistory: Nagl, Cos y Macho, Vico, Bauer, Almarez y Santos. He then created one cardinal in a secret consistory and named a papal legate to inform him and deliver his cardinal's insignia. (Note: The public consistory preceded the secret one later the same day.)

Name	Title when named cardinal	Country
Károly Hornig (1840–1917) (Note: Hornig came to Rome and was assigned his titular church on 25 May 1914.)	Bishop of Veszprém	Austria-Hungary

== 25 May 1914 ==
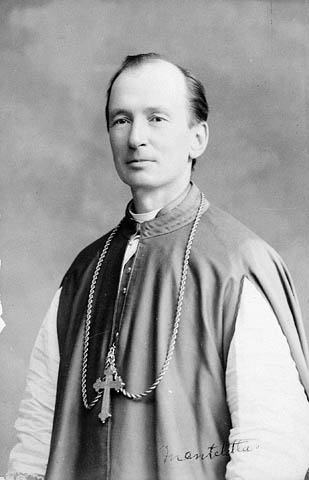
Louis-Nazaire Bégin (1840–1925), made a cardinal on 25 May 1914.

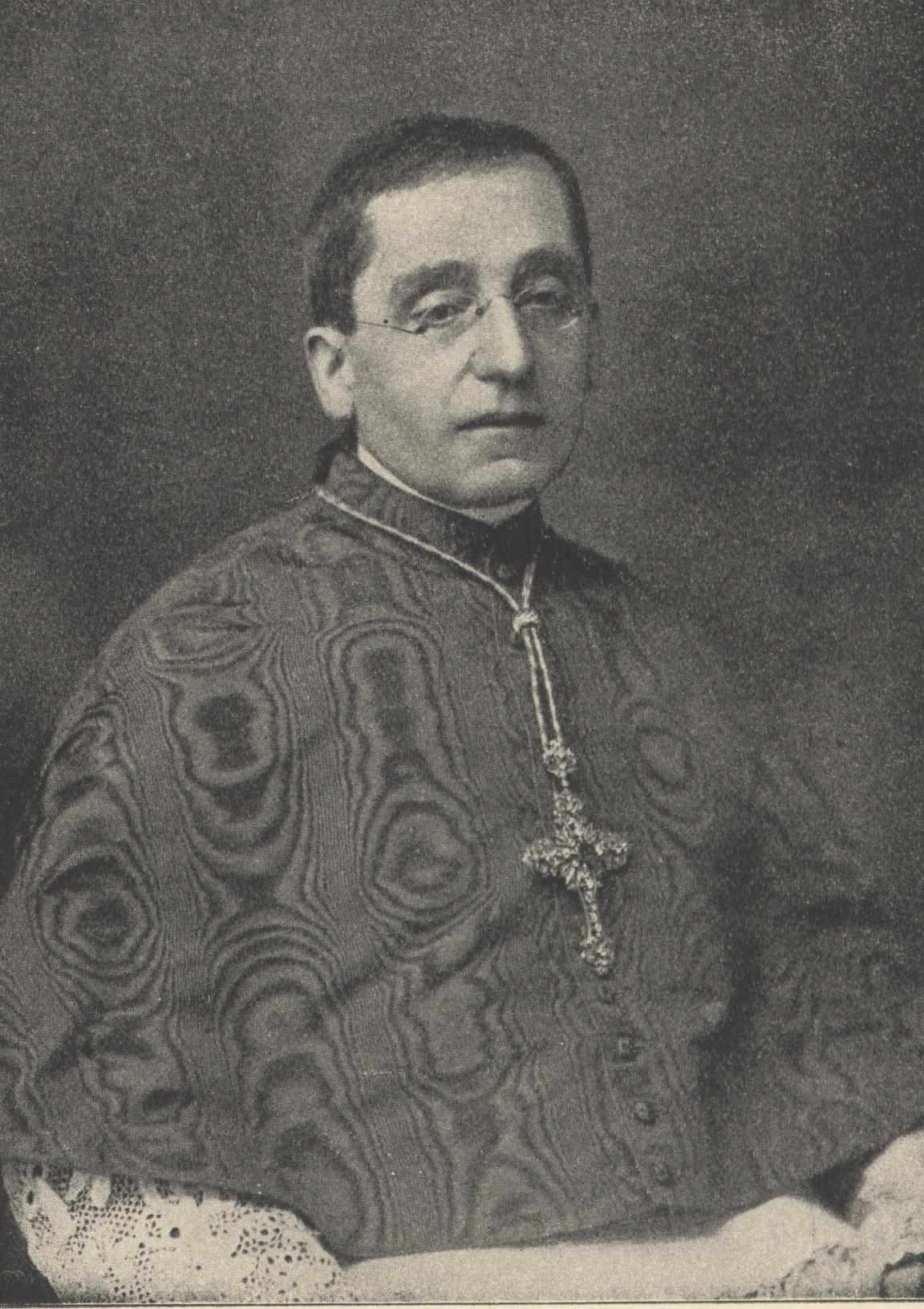
Giacomo della Chiesa (1854–1922), made a cardinal on 25 May 1914 and elected as Pope Benedict XV on 3 September 1914.

On 26 April 1914, Pope Pius announced he would create 13 new cardinals at a 25 May consistory. On that day he created nine of the order of cardinal priests and four cardinal deacons. He also told the consistory he had made Mendes Belo a cardinal in pectore in November 1911. Three days later he gave red galeri and assigned churches and deaconries to ten of them. The others–Guisasola y Menéndez, Csernoch, Piff, and Mendes Belo–received their cardinals' galeri and titular church assignments from his successor Pope Benedict XV on 8 September 1914, a month after he was elected pope.

Name	Title when named cardinal	Country
Victoriano Guisasola y Menéndez (1852–1920)	Patriach of the West Indies	Spain
Louis-Nazaire Bégin (1840–1925)	Archbishop of Québec	Canada
Domenico Serafini (1852–1918)	Assessor of the Supreme Sacred Congregation of the Holy Office	Italy
Giacomo della Chiesa (1854–1922) (Note: Elected as Pope Benedict XV (1914-1922).)	Archbishop of Bologna	Italy
János Csernoch (1852–1927)	Archbishop of Esztergom	Austria-Hungary
Franziskus von Bettinger (1850–1917)	Archbishop of Munich and Freising	Germany
Hector Sévin (1852–1916)	Archbishop of Lyon	France
Felix von Hartmann (1851–1919)	Archbishop of Cologne	Germany
Friedrich Gustav Piffl (1864–1932)	Archbishop of Vienna	Austria-Hungary
Scipione Tecchi (1854–1915)	Secretary of the Sacred College of Cardinals	Italy
Filippo Giustini (1852–1920)	Secretary of the Sacred Congregation of the Sacraments	Italy
Michele Lega (1860–1935)	Dean of the Sacred Roman Rota	Italy
Francis Aidan Gasquet (1846–1929)	President Emeritus of the English Benedictine Congregation	(United Kingdom of Great Britain and Ireland) Great Britain
