= Cardinal electors for the 1914 conclave =

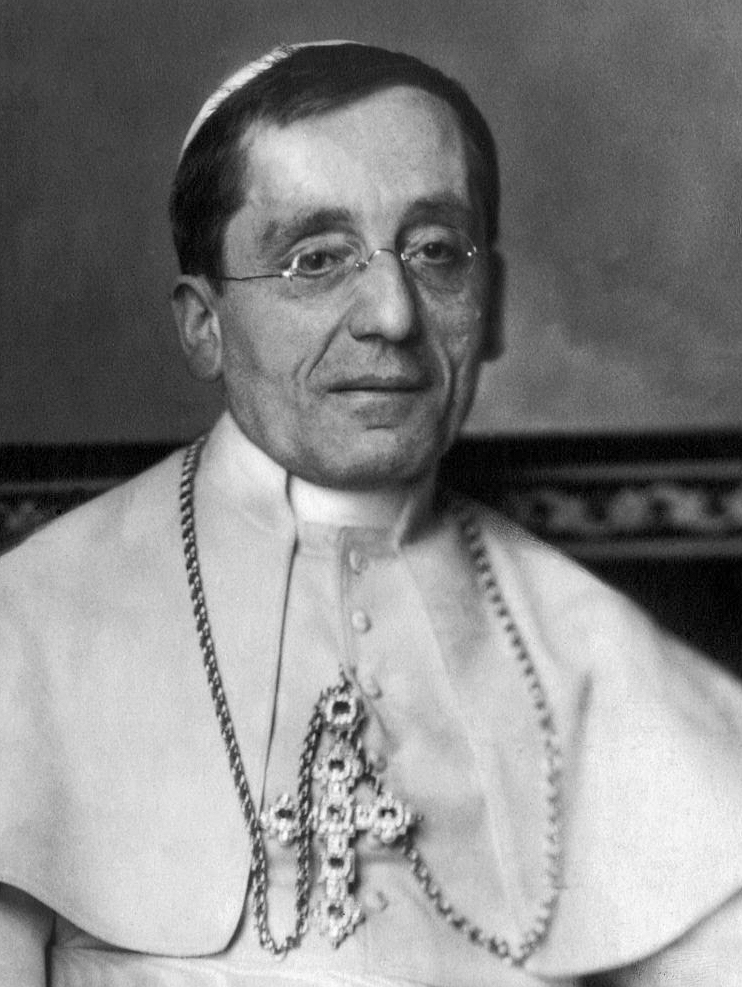
Cardinal Giacomo della Chiesa was elected Pope Benedict XV by the 1914 conclave on 3 September.

The papal conclave of 1914 was convened to elect a pope, the leader of the Catholic Church, to succeed Pope Pius X following his death on 20 August 1914.

Of the 65 members of the College of Cardinals at the time of Pius X's death, 57 participated in the subsequent conclave. William Henry O'Connell and James Gibbons arrived too late from the United States, as did Louis-Nazaire Bégin from Quebec. Sebastiano Martinelli, Franziskus von Sales Bauer, Kolos Ferenc Vaszary, Giuseppe Antonio Ermenegildo Prisco, and François-Virgile Dubillard were too ill or too frail.

The cardinal electors entered the Sistine Chapel to begin the conclave on 31 August 1914. On 3 September, after ten ballots over four days, they elected Cardinal Giacomo della Chiesa, the archbishop of Bologna, who took the papal name Benedict XV.

== Cardinal electors ==
The data below are as of 20 August 1914, the date on which the Holy See became vacant. Cardinals belonging to institutes of consecrated life or to societies of apostolic life are indicated by the relevant post-nominal letters.

* Elected pope

Rank	Name	Country	Born	Order	Consistory	Office
1	Serafino Vannutelli	Italy	26 November 1834 (age 79)	CB	14 March 1887; Leo XIII	Prefect of the Congregation of Ceremonies, Major Penitentiary of the Sacred Apostolic Penitentiary (Dean)
2	Antonio Agliardi	Italy	4 September 1832 (age 81)	CB	22 June 1896; Leo XIII	Chancellor of the Apostolic Chancery (Vice-Dean)
3	Vincenzo Vannutelli	Italy	5 December 1836 (age 77)	CB	30 December 1889; Leo XIII	Prefect of the Supreme Tribunal of the Apostolic Signatura, Archpriest of Santa Maria Maggiore
4	Francesco di Paola Cassetta	Italy	12 August 1841 (age 73)	CB	19 June 1899; Leo XIII	Prefect of the Sacred Congregation of the Council, Archivist of the Vatican Secret Archive, Librarian of the Vatican Library
5	Gaetano de Lai	Italy	26 July 1853 (age 61)	CB	16 December 1907; Pius X	Secretary of the Sacred Consistorial Congregation
6	Diomede Falconio OFM	Italy (Note: Falconio was an Italian-born U.S. citizen who spent much of his career in Canada and the United States.)	20 September 1842 (age 71)	CB	27 November 1911; Pius X	Apostolic Delegate Emeritus to the United States
7	José Sebastião de Almeida Neto OFMDisc	Portugal	8 February 1841 (age 73)	CP	24 March 1884; Leo XIII	Patriarch Emeritus of Lisbon (Protopriest)
8	Angelo Di Pietro	Italy	22 May 1828 (age 86)	CP	16 January 1893; Leo XIII	Datary of His Holiness of the Apostolic Dataria
9	Michael Logue	United Kingdom	1 October 1840 (age 73)	CP	16 January 1893; Leo XIII	Archbishop of Armagh
10	Andrea Carlo Ferrari	Italy	13 August 1850 (age 64)	CP	18 May 1894; Leo XIII	Archbishop of Milan
11	Girolamo Maria Gotti OCD	Italy	29 March 1834 (age 80)	CP	29 November 1895; Leo XIII	Prefect of the Sacred Congregation of the Propagation of the Faith
12	Domenico Ferrata	Italy	4 March 1847 (age 67)	CP	22 June 1896; Leo XIII	Archpriest of Archbasilica of Saint John Lateran, Secretary of the Supreme Sacred Congregation of the Holy Office
13	José María Martín de Herrera y de la Iglesia	Spain	26 August 1835 (age 78)	CP	19 April 1897; Leo XIII	Archbishop of Santiago de Compostela
14	Giuseppe Francica-Nava di Bontifé	Spain	23 July 1846 (age 68)	CP	19 June 1899; Leo XIII	Archbishop of Catania
15	Agostino Richelmy	Italy	29 November 1850 (age 63)	CP	19 June 1899; Leo XIII	Archbishop of Turin
16	Lev Skrbenský z Hříště	Austria-Hungary	12 June 1863 (age 51)	CP	15 April 1901; Leo XIII	Archbishop of Prague
17	Giulio Boschi	Italy	2 March 1838 (age 76)	CP	15 April 1901; Leo XIII	Archbishop of Ferrara
18	Bartolomeo Bacilieri	Italy	28 March 1842 (age 72)	CP	15 April 1901; Leo XIII	Bishop of Verona
19	Rafael Merry del Val	Spain	10 October 1865 (age 48)	CP	9 November 1903; Pius X	Vatican Secretary of State
20	Joaquim Arcoverde de Albuquerque Cavalcanti	Brazil	17 January 1850 (age 64)	CP	11 December 1905; Pius X	Archbishop of São Sebastião de Rio de Janeiro
21	Aristide Cavallari	Italy	8 February 1849 (age 65)	CP	15 April 1907; Pius X	Patriarch of Venice
22	Aristide Rinaldini	Italy	5 February 1844 (age 70)	CP	15 April 1907; Pius X	Camerlengo Emeritus of the College of Cardinals
23	Benedetto Lorenzelli	Italy	11 May 1853 (age 61)	CP	15 April 1907; Pius X	Prefect of the Congregation for Catholic Studies
24	Pietro Maffi	Italy	12 October 1858 (age 55)	CP	15 April 1907; Pius X	Archbishop of Pisa
25	Alessandro Lualdi	Italy	12 August 1858 (age 56)	CP	15 April 1907; Pius X	Archbishop of Palermo
26	Désiré-Joseph Mercier	Belgium	12 November 1851 (age 62)	CP	15 April 1907; Pius X	Archbishop of Mechelen
27	Pietro Gasparri	Italy	5 May 1852 (age 62)	CP	16 December 1907; Pius X	Camerlengo of the College of Cardinals
28	Louis-Henri-Joseph Luçon	France	28 October 1842 (age 71)	CP	16 December 1907; Pius X	Archbishop of Reims
29	Pierre Andrieu	France	7 December 1849 (age 64)	CP	16 December 1907; Pius X	Archbishop of Bordeaux
30	António Mendes Belo	Portugal	18 June 1842 (age 72)	CP	27 November 1911; Pius X	Patriarch of Lisbon
31	José Cos y Macho	Spain	6 August 1838 (age 76)	CP	27 November 1911; Pius X	Archbishop of Valladolid
32	Antonio Vico	Italy	9 January 1847 (age 67)	CP	27 November 1911; Pius X	Apostolic Nuncio Emeritus to Spain
33	Gennaro Granito Pignatelli di Belmonte	Italy	10 April 1851 (age 63)	CP	27 November 1911; Pius X	Apostolic Nuncio Emeritus to Austria-Hungary
34	John Murphy Farley	United States	20 April 1842 (age 72)	CP	27 November 1911; Pius X	Archbishop of New York
35	Francis Bourne	United Kingdom	23 March 1861 (age 53)	CP	27 November 1911; Pius X	Archbishop of Westminster
36	Léon-Adolphe Amette	France	6 September 1850 (age 63)	CP	27 November 1911; Pius X	Archbishop of Paris
37	Enrique Almaraz y Santos	Spain	22 September 1847 (age 66)	CP	27 November 1911; Pius X	Archbishop of Seville
38	François de Rovérié de Cabrières	France	30 August 1830 (age 83)	CP	27 November 1911; Pius X	Bishop of Montpellier
39	Basilio Pompili	Italy	16 April 1858 (age 56)	CP	27 November 1911; Pius X	Vicar General of Rome
40	Károly Hornig	Austria-Hungary	10 August 1840 (age 74)	CP	2 December 1912; Pius X	Bishop of Veszprém
41	Victoriano Guisasola y Menendez	Spain	21 April 1852 (age 62)	CP	25 May 1914; Pius X	Archbishop of Toledo
42	Domenico Serafini OSB	Italy	3 August 1852 (age 62)	CP	25 May 1914; Pius X	Assessor Emeritus of the Supreme ink
43	Giacomo della Chiesa	Italy	21 November 1854 (age 59)	CP	25 May 1914; Pius X	Archbishop of Bologna
44	János Csernoch	Austria-Hungary	18 June 1852 (age 62)	CP	25 May 1914; Pius X	Archbishop of Esztergom
45	Franziskus von Bettinger	Germany	17 September 1850 (age 63)	CP	25 May 1914; Pius X	Archbishop of Munich and Freising
46	Hector Sévin	France	22 March 1852 (age 62)	CP	25 May 1914; Pius X	Archbishop of Lyon
47	Felix von Hartmann	Germany	15 December 1851 (age 62)	CP	25 May 1914; Pius X	Archbishop of Cologne
48	Friedrich Gustav Piffl CCRSA	Austria-Hungary	15 October 1864 (age 49)	CP	25 May 1914; Pius X	Archbishop of Vienna
49	Francesco Salesio Della Volpe	Italy	20 December 1844 (age 69)	CD	19 June 1899; Leo XIII	Camerlengo of the Holy Roman Church, Prefect of the Sacred Congregation of the Index (Protodeacon)
50	Ottavio Cagiano de Azevedo	Italy	7 November 1845 (age 68)	CD	11 December 1905; Pius X	Prefect of the Sacred Congregation of Religious
51	Gaetano Bisleti	Italy	20 March 1856 (age 58)	CD	27 November 1911; Pius X	Grand Prior of the Sovereign Order of Malta
52	Louis Billot SJ	France	12 January 1846 (age 68)	CD	27 November 1911; Pius X	Cardinal Deacon of Santa Maria in Via Lata
53	Willem Marinus van Rossum CSSR	Netherlands	3 September 1854 (age 59)	CD	27 November 1911; Pius X	President of the Pontifical Commission for Biblical Studies
54	Scipione Tecchi	Italy	27 June 1854 (age 60)	CD	25 May 1914; Pius X	Assessor Emeritus of the Sacred Consistorial Congregation
55	Filippo Giustini	Italy	8 May 1852 (age 62)	CD	25 May 1914; Pius X	Secretary of the Sacred Congregation of the Sacraments
56	Michele Lega	France	1 January 1860 (age 54)	CD	25 May 1914; Pius X	Dean emeritus of the Sacred Roman Rota
57	Francis Aidan Gasquet EBC	United Kingdom	5 October 1846 (age 67)	CD	25 May 1914; Pius X	President Emeritus of the English Benedictine Congregation

=== Not in attendance ===
Rank	Name	Country	Born	Order	Consistory	Office	Reason for absence
1	James Gibbons	United States	23 July 1834 (age 80)	CP	7 June 1886; Leo XIII	Archbishop of Baltimore	Did not arrive in time
2	Kolos Ferenc Vaszary OSB	Austria-Hungary	12 February 1832 (age 82)	CP	16 January 1893; Leo XIII	Archbishop Emeritus of Esztergom	Illness
3	Giuseppe Antonio Ermenegildo Prisco	Italy	8 September 1833 (age 80)	CP	30 November 1896; Leo XIII	Archbishop of Naples	Illness
4	Sebastiano Martinelli OESA	Italy	20 August 1848 (age 66)	CP	15 April 1901; Leo XIII	Prefect of the Congregation for Sacred Rites	Illness
5	Franziskus von Sales Bauer	Austria-Hungary	26 January 1841 (age 73)	CP	27 November 1911; Pius X	Archbishop of Olomouc	Illness
6	William Henry O'Connell	United States	8 December 1859 (age 54)	CP	27 November 1911; Pius X	Archbishop of Boston	Did not arrive in time
7	François-Virgile Dubillard	France	16 February 1845 (age 69)	CP	27 November 1911; Pius X	Archbishop of Chambéry	Illness
8	Louis-Nazaire Bégin	Canada	10 January 1840 (age 74)	CP	25 May 1914; Pius X	Archbishop of Quebec	Did not arrive in time

== Cardinal electors by country ==
* Country of elected pope

Cardinal electors by country
Country	Continent	Number
Austria-Hungary	Europe	4
Belgium	Europe	1
Brazil	South America	1
France	Europe	6
Germany	Europe	2
Italy*	Europe	32
Netherlands	Europe	1
Portugal	Europe	2
Spain	Europe	4
United Kingdom	Europe	3
United States	North America	1
Total		57

== See also ==
- Cardinals created by Leo XIII
- Cardinals created by Pius X
- Cardinal electors for the 1903 conclave
- Cardinal electors for the 1922 conclave
