= Giulio Boschi =

Italian Cardinal

His Eminence Giulio Boschi
- Archbishop Emeritus of Ferrara
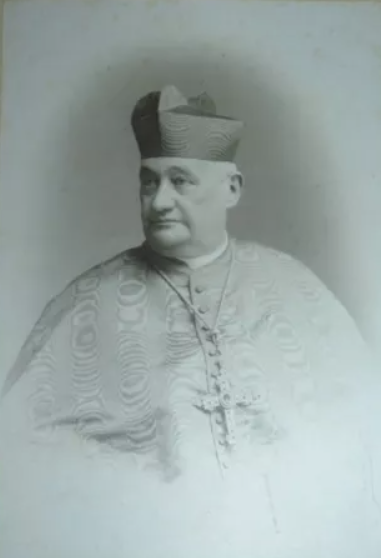
- Church: Roman Catholic Church
- Archdiocese: Ferrara
- See: Ferrara
- Appointed: 19 April 1900
- Term ended: 7 January 1919
- Predecessor: Pietro Respighi
- Successor: Francesco Rossi
- Other posts: Cardinal-Bishop of Frascati (1919–20); Camerlengo of the College of Cardinals (1920)
- Previous posts: Bishop of Todi (1888–95); Bishop of Senigallia (1895–1900); Cardinal-Priest of San Lorenzo in Panisperna (1901–19); Bishop of Comacchio (1909–19)

Orders
- Ordination: 25 May 1861 by Gioacchino Pecci
- Consecration: 11 June 1888 by Carlo Laurenzi
- Created cardinal: 15 April 1901 by Pope Leo XIII
- Rank: Cardinal-Priest (1901–19); Cardinal-Bishop (1919–20)

Personal details
- Born: Giulio Boschi; 2 March 1838 Perugia, Papal States
- Died: 15 May 1920 (aged 82) Rome, Kingdom of Italy
- Buried: Campo Verano
- Parents: Francesco Boschi; Giuseppa Mancini
- Education: Pontifical Gregorian University

Styles of Giulio Boschi
- Reference style: His Eminence
- Spoken style: Your Eminence
- Informal style: Cardinal
- See: Frascati (suburbicarian)

Giulio Boschi (2 March 1838 – 15 May 1920) was an Italian Cardinal of the Roman Catholic Church who served as Archbishop of Ferrara from 1900 to 1919, and was elevated to the cardinalate in 1901.

== Biography ==
Giulio Boschi was born in Perugia, as the youngest of the eleven children of Francesco and Giusseppa (née Mancini) Boschi. His siblings included: Assunta (b. 1813), Gaspare (b. 1816), Piera (b. 1818), Flora (b. 1820), Giovanni (b. 1823), Alessandro (b. 1826), Ferdinando (b. 1828), Vincenzo (b. 1831), Cesare (b. 1832), and Nicola (b. 1835). He received both his first Communion and the Sacrament of Confirmation from Archbishop Gioacchino Pecci.

Boschi studied at the seminary in Perugia before being ordained to the priesthood by Archbishop Pecci on 25 May 1861. He then went to Rome to study at the Pontifical Gregorian University, where he obtained a doctorate in theology. Upon his return to Perugia, Boschi did pastoral work at the Cathedral, and served as episcopal master of ceremonies, apostolic missionary, prosynodal examiner, and canon penitentiary. He was made Archpriest of the cathedral chapter in November 1878, and Domestic Prelate of His Holiness in August 1880.

On 1 June 1888, Boschi was appointed Bishop of Todi by Pope Leo XIII, formerly Archbishop Pecci. He received his episcopal consecration on the following 11 June from Cardinal Carlo Laurenzi at Rome. He was later named Bishop of Senigallia on 29 November 1895, and promoted to Archbishop of Ferrara on 19 April 1900.

Pope Leo created him Cardinal-Priest of San Lorenzo in Panisperna in the consistory of 15 April 1901. Boschi was one of the cardinal electors in the 1903 papal conclave, which selected Pope Pius X, and was named Bishop of Comacchio, in addition to his post in Ferrara, on 7 January 1909. He later participated in the conclave of 1914, which resulted in the election of Pope Benedict XV. In 1919, he resigned as Bishop of Comacchio and as Archbishop of Ferrara (7 January). Boschi was made Cardinal Bishop of Frascati on 3 July the same year, and Camerlengo of the Sacred College of Cardinals on 8 March 1920, remaining in both posts until his death.

Cardinal Boschi died in Rome at the age of 82. His funeral was held at the church of S. Ignazio four days later, on 19 May 1919, and he was then buried at the chapel of St. Peter's Basilica in the Campo Verano cemetery.

Catholic Church titles
| Preceded by Eugenio Luzzi | Bishop of Todi; 1 June 1888 – 29 November 1895 | Succeeded by Giuseppe Ridolfi |
| Preceded by Ignazio Bartoli | Bishop of Senigallia; 29 November 1895 – 19 April 1900 | Succeeded by Tito Cucchi |
| Preceded by Pietro Respighi | Archbishop of Ferrara; 19 April 1900 – 7 January 1914 | Succeeded by Francesco Rossi |
| Preceded by Alfonso Archi | Bishop of Comacchio; 7 January 1909 – 3 July 1919 | Succeeded by Gherardo Menegazzi, OFM Cap |
| Preceded by Basilio Pompili | Chamberlain of the Sacred College of Cardinals; 8 March – 15 May 1920 | Succeeded by Rafael Merry del Val |
