= Louis Decorsant =

Louis Decorsant (1866-1935) was a Catholic Priest principally known for promoting devotion to the Immaculate Heart of Mary based on the mystical experiences of the Belgian Franciscan Tertiary, Berthe Petit.

== Background ==
Berthe Petit had aspired to enter religious life, but in December 1888, her confessor advised her that her vocation was not to enter a convent, but to stay at home at care for her parents. Petit prayed to the Blessed Virgin that someone be called to the priesthood in lieu of her aspirations to enter religious life.

== Life ==
Louis Decorsant was born in Saint-Quentin, Aisne, France, in 1866. He initially trained as a lawyer in Paris, where he earned a Doctor of Law degree. An officer in the reserves, he broke his engagement to be married and decided to study for the priesthood in Rome. He obtained a doctorate in philosophy and theology and returned to Paris, where he was ordained on 9 July 1893 in the chapel of the Institut Catholique de Paris.

After serving fifteen years as a curate in Vincennes, France, Decorsant resigned due to overwork and failing health. In 1908, he made a pilgrimage to Lourdes where he first encountered Berthe Petit. He then left for Brussels, where he took up residence in a convent guest-house. He devoted his time to preaching and giving retreats. Under the supervision of Redemptorist Father Masselis, Decorsant became Petit's spiritual director. When Petit was granted the privilege of a private oratory, he became her chaplain. Petit reported revelations regarding the establishment of a devotion to the Sorrowful and Immaculate Heart of Mary.

Through Father Masselis, Decorsant and Petit met Cardinal Désiré-Joseph Mercier, Archbishop of Mechelen, who in 1911 approved the prayer, "Sorrowful and Immaculate Heart of Mary, pray for us who have recourse to thee."

Later, he was instrumental in communicating some of her revelations to Pope Benedict XV via Cardinal Mercier, resulting in the Pope's explicit recommendation to seek the intercession of the "Sorrowful and Immaculate Heart of Mary" ('Cuore addolorato ed immacolato di Maria') in his May 1915 letter to the bishops of the world. Decorsant was also a correspondent with Cardinal Bourne of Westminster in preparing a national act of consecration to the Sorrowful and Immaculate Heart of Mary in Lent 1917.

Decorsant authored several books on sociology and apologetics, including Les Socialisme Voila L'Ennemi ("Socialism that's the Enemy").
