= Benoît-Marie Langénieux =

French Archbishop and Cardinal

His Eminence Benoît-Marie Langénieux
- Archbishop of Reims
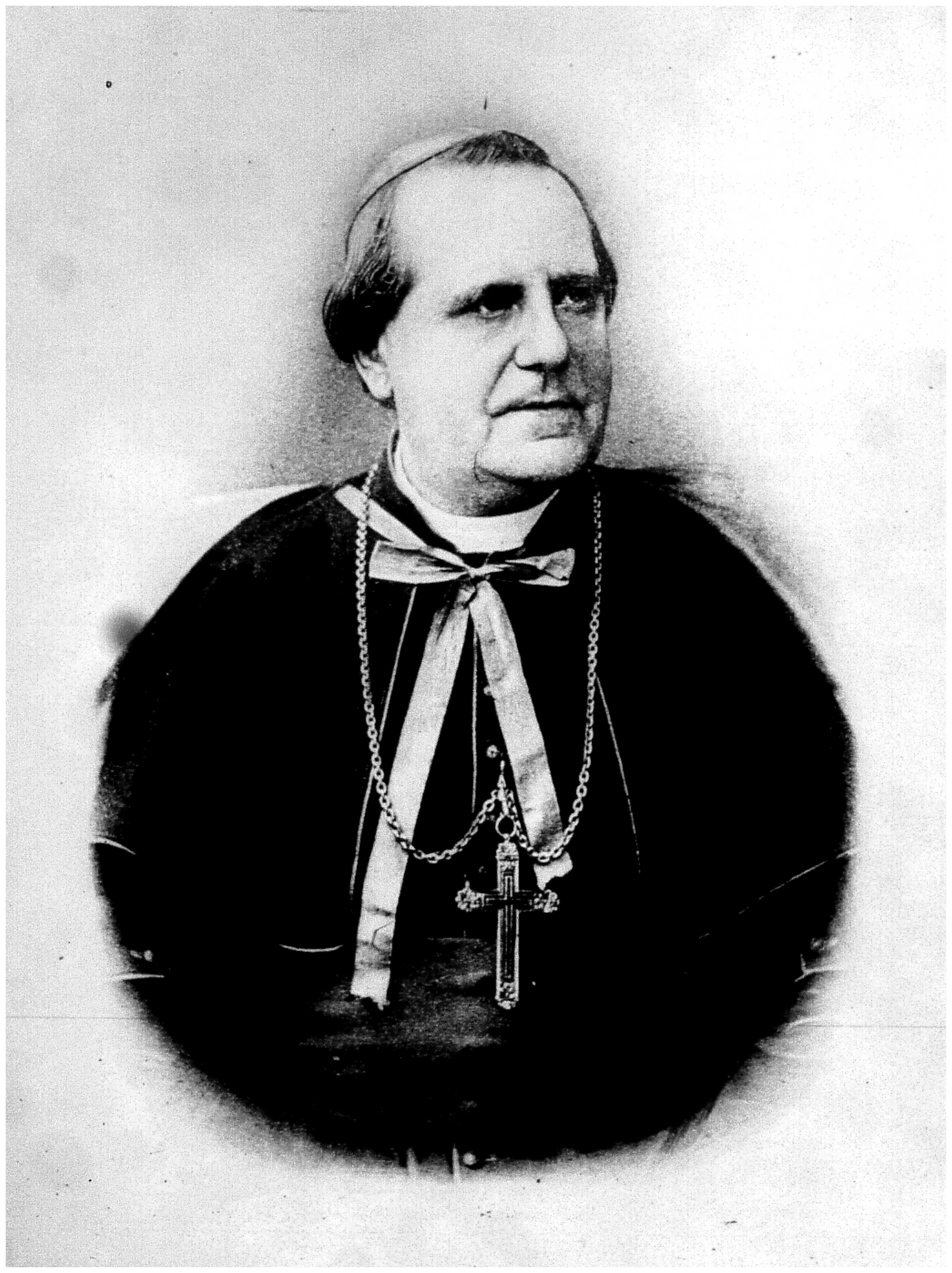
- The cardinal circa 1900.
- Church: Roman Catholic Church
- Archdiocese: Reims
- See: Reims
- Appointed: 21 December 1874
- Installed: 22 February 1875
- Term ended: 1 January 1905
- Predecessor: Jean-Baptiste-François-Anne-Thomas Landriot
- Successor: Louis-Henri-Joseph Luçon
- Other post: Cardinal-Priest of San Giovanni a Porta Latina (1887-1905)
- Previous post: Bishop of Tarbes (1873-74)

Orders
- Ordination: 21 December 1850 by Marie-Dominique-Auguste Sibour
- Consecration: 28 October 1873 by Joseph-Hippolyte Guibert
- Created cardinal: 7 June 1886 by Pope Leo XIII
- Rank: Cardinal-Priest

Personal details
- Born: Benoît-Marie Langénieux; 15 October 1824 Villefranche-sur-Saone, Lyon, French Kingdom
- Died: 1 January 1905 (aged 80) Reims, French Third Republic
- Buried: Reims Cathedral
- Parents: Claude Antoine Langénieux; Aimée Charles
- Education: Sorbonne University
- Motto: Vivit in me Christus
- Coat of arms

Benoît-Marie Langénieux (born 15 October 1824 at Villefranche-sur-Saône, Rhône – 1 January 1905 at Reims) was a French Archbishop of Reims and Cardinal.

== Biography ==
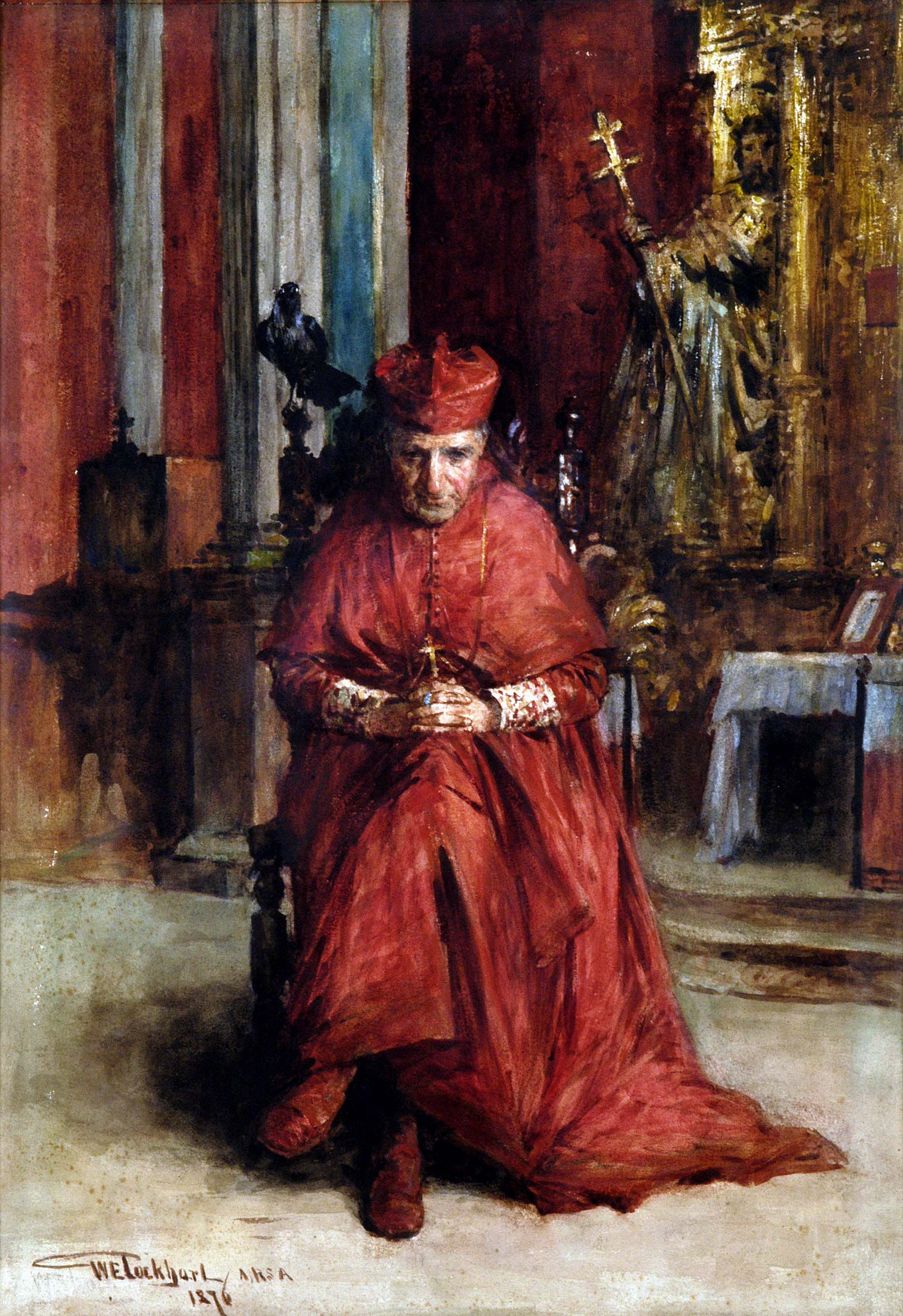
Benoît-Marie Langénieux by William Ewart Lockhart.

Langénieux studied humanities in Paris at St-Nicolas du Chardonnet, under Félix Dupanloup; and theology at St-Sulpice, where he was ordained, 1850. After nine years as curate at St-Roch, he became successively diocesan promoter 1859; curé of St-Ambroise, 1863; then of St-Augustin, 1868; Vicar-General of Paris, and archdeacon of Notre-Dame in 1871.

Made Bishop of Tarbes in 1873, Langénieux was in the following year translated to the archiepiscopal See of Reims. The thirty-one years of his episcopate were fruitful ones. Beside obtaining from the French legislature an appropriation of two millions of francs for the restoration of Reims Cathedral, he secured for the Trappists the ancient Abbey of Igny, and for the Oratorians the priory of Binson, and erected at Châtillon the colossal statue of Pope Urban II, whose cultus he had promoted in Rome. He built in the suburbs of his metropolis the churches of Ste-Geneviève, St-Jean-Baptiste de La Salle, St-Benoit, and Ste-Clothilde, this latter being afterwards made the seat of an archconfraternity of prayer for France, and the place of celebration of the fourteenth centenary of Clovis's baptism. When the law of school secularization came into effect, he filled his see with Catholic schools and founded four asylums for orphans.

Created cardinal in 1886, Langénieux presided as papal legate over the Eucharistic Congresses of Jerusalem, Reims, and Lourdes. He took an active part in the beatification of Joan of Arc. He fought the anti-religious legislation that was being prepared against Christian education, the religious institutes, and the concordat. He was a close friend of Pope Leo XIII, who frequently consulted him regarding the Church in France; after the death of Leo XIII, he participated in the conclave of 1903, which elected Pope Pius X.

He was also made a Knight of the Legion of Honour.

Langénieux was sometimes called Cardinal des ouvriers for his advocacy on behalf of the working class. Many European rulers decorated him, and his two jubilees and his funeral were attended by large numbers of bishops, priests, and lay people. His eulogy was pronounced by Gaspard-Marie-Michel-André Latty, Bishop of Châlons-sur-Marne, and Bishop Touchet, of Orléans. He was buried in the metropolitan cathedral of Reims.

== Works ==
Langénieux's writings include:

- "Déclaration des Cardinaux et exposé de la situation faite à l'Église de France" (1892)
- "Lettre au Président de la République" (1904)
- eight pastoral letters (Tarbes, 1873)
- 231 mandements (Reims, 1874–1905)
- "Abregé de l'Histoire de la Religion" (Paris, 1874).

In addition, he wrote a number of occasional discourses.

== Sources ==
- Frezel, Son Eminence le Cardinal Langénieux (Reims, 1905)
- Frezel, in L'Episcopat francais (Paris, 1907), under Tarbes, and Reims
- Compans, Son Eminence le Cardinal Langénieux (Reims, 1887)
- La France chrétienne à Reims en 1896 (Paris, 1896).
