= Aristide Rinaldini =

Italian Cardinal (1844–1920)

His Eminence Aristide Rinaldini
- Camerlengo Emeritus of the College of Cardinals
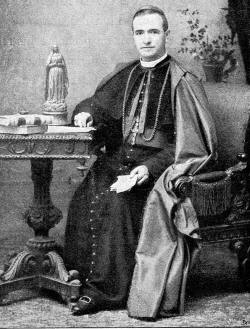
- Rinaldi pictured as an archbishop in 1899.
- Church: Roman Catholic Church
- Appointed: 2 December 1912
- Term ended: 25 May 1914
- Predecessor: Rafael Merry del Val de Zulueta
- Successor: Pietro Gasparri
- Other post: Cardinal-Priest of San Pancrazio (1907-20)
- Previous posts: Apostolic Nuncio to Belgium (1896-99); Titular Archbishop of Heraclea (1896-1907); Apostolic Nuncio to Spain (1899-1907)

Orders
- Ordination: 6 June 1868
- Consecration: 30 August 1896 by Mariano Rampolla del Tindaro
- Created cardinal: 15 April 1907 by Pope Pius X
- Rank: Cardinal-Priest

Personal details
- Born: Aristide Rinaldini; 5 February 1844 Montefalco, Spoleto, Papal States
- Died: 11 February 1920 (aged 76) Rome, Kingdom of Italy
- Buried: Campo Verano
- Education: Almo Collegio Capranica; Pontifical Gregorian University

Styles of Aristide Rinaldini
- Reference style: His Eminence
- Spoken style: Your Eminence
- Informal style: Cardinal
- See: none

Aristide Rinaldini (5 February 1844 – 11 February 1920) was an Italian Cardinal of the Catholic Church. He served as Apostolic Nuncio to Spain from 1899 to 1907. He was made a cardinal in 1907.

== Biography ==
Born on 5 February 1844, in Montefalco, Rinaldini studied at the seminary of the Vatican (1860–1862), Almo Collegio Capranica in Rome (1862–1868), and the Pontifical Gregorian University, where he obtained his doctorate in philosophy and licentiate in theology. He was ordained to the priesthood on 6 June 1868 and then served as secretary of the Apostolic Nunciature to Portugal until 1872.

Within the nunciature to Belgium, Rinaldini served as secretary from 1872 to 1880. He remained in Belgium as a "private agent" after the liberal cabinet of Prime Minister Walthère Frère-Orban broke diplomatic relations with the Holy See and Nuncio Serafino Vannutelli left for Rome. Rinaldini served as chargé d'affaires from 1880 to 1885 and auditor in 1887.

Following his elevation to a protonotary apostolic ad instar participantium, he was the Internuncio to the Netherlands from 1887 to 1893. He also became Internuncio to Luxembourg in January 1891 and handed over his credentials to Adolphe, Grand Duke of Luxembourg on 9 February 1891. He returned to Italy when made Substitute of the Vatican Secretariat of State on 31 May 1893 and remained in that position for three years.

On 14 August 1896, Rinaldini was appointed Nuncio to Belgium and Titular Archbishop of Heraclea in Europa by Pope Leo XIII. He received his episcopal consecration on 30 August from Cardinal Mariano Rampolla, with Bishops Guglielmo Pifferi, OSA and Vincenzo Veneri (Rinaldini's own cousin) serving as co-consecrators. He was named Nuncio to Spain on 28 December 1899. He acted as the papal legate to the baptism of the Prince of Asturias on 18 May 1907.

Pope Pius X made him Cardinal-Priest of San Pancrazio in the consistory of 15 April 1907. Rinaldini was Camerlengo of the College of Cardinals on 2 December 1912 to 25 May 1914 and was one of the cardinals who participated in the 1914 papal conclave that elected Pope Benedict XV.

He died in Rome, on 11 February 1920, aged 76. He is buried in the chapel of the Reverend Fabric of St. Peter's at the Campo Verano cemetery.

== Honours ==
=== Foreign Honours ===
Spain:

- Grand Cross with Collar of the Order of Charles III (30 May 1906)

Catholic Church titles
Preceded by Benedetto Lorenzelli	Nuncio to Belgium; 1896–1899	Succeeded by Gennaro Granito Pignatelli di Belmonte
Preceded by Giuseppe Francica-Nava di Bontifé	Nuncio to Spain; 1899–1907	Succeeded by Antonio Vico
