= Benedetto Lorenzelli =

Italian Catholic cardinal (1853–1915)

His Eminence Benedetto Lorenzelli
- Prefect of the Congregation of Studies
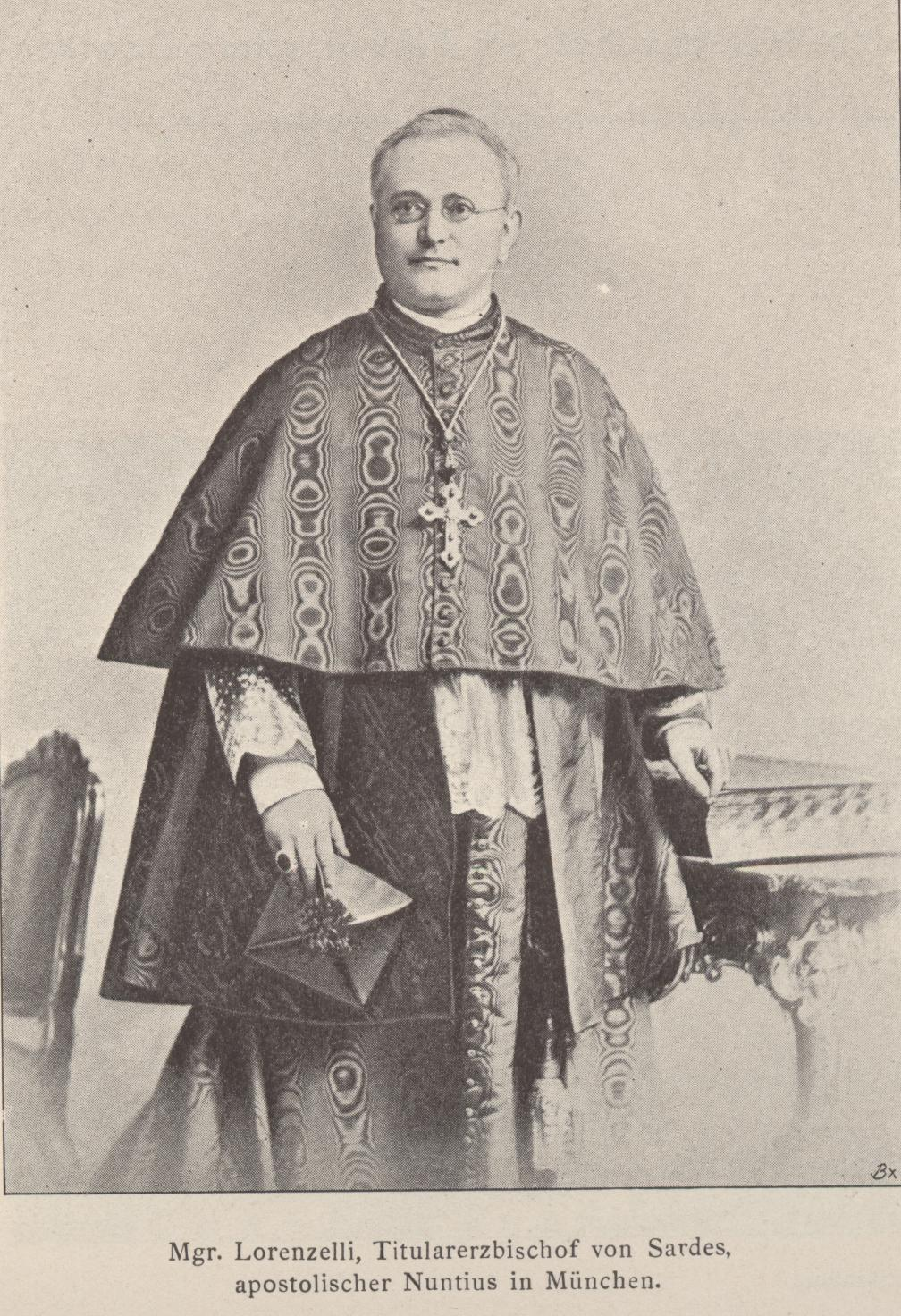
- Church: Roman Catholic Church
- Appointed: 13 February 1914
- Term ended: 15 September 1915
- Predecessor: Beniamino Cavicchoni
- Successor: Gaetano Bisleti
- Other post: Cardinal-Priest of Santa Croce in Gerusalemme (1907-15)
- Previous posts: Apostolic Internuncio to Belgium (1893-96); Titular Archbishop of Sardes (1896-1904); Apostolic Nuncio to France (1899-1904); Archbishop of Lucca (1904-10)

Orders
- Ordination: 1 April 1876 by Carlo Luigi Morichini
- Consecration: 8 December 1896 by Mariano Rampolla del Tindaro
- Created cardinal: 15 April 1907 by Pope Pius X
- Rank: Cardinal-Priest

Personal details
- Born: Benedetto Lorenzelli; 11 May 1853 Castel di Casio, Bologna, Papal States
- Died: 15 September 1915 (aged 62) Bucciano, San Miniato, Kingdom of Italy
- Education: Pontifical Roman Athenaeum S. Apollinare

Styles of Benedetto Lorenzelli
- Reference style: His Eminence
- Spoken style: Your Eminence
- Informal style: Cardinal
- See: none

Benedetto Lorenzelli (11 May 1853 – 15 September 1915) was an Italian Cardinal of the Roman Catholic Church He served as Prefect of the Sacred Congregation of Studies from 1914 until his death, and was elevated to the cardinalate in 1907.

== Biography ==
Benedetto Lorenzelli was born in Castel di Casio, and studied at the seminary in Bologna and the Pontifical Roman Athenaeum S. Apollinare in Rome, from where he obtained his doctorates in philosophy, theology, and civil and canon law. Lorenzelli was ordained to the priesthood on 1 April 1876, and then taught philosophy at the Pontifical Urban University in Rome until 1884.

He was Professor of dogmatic theology at the Pontifical Roman Athenaeum "S. Apollinare" from 1884 to 1889, whilst serving as the first Rector of the Pontifical Bohemian College. After being named as member of the Pontifical Academy "S. Tommaso", Lorenzelli served as an ablegatus to Vienna on 3 April 1884 and later received an honorary doctorate in philosophy from the University of Laval in Canada. He was raised to the rank of Privy Chamberlain of His Holiness in 1889, and became an attaché in the nunciature to Austria on 3 April that year. On 18 June 1890, he entered the Roman Curia as a referendary prelate of the Supreme Tribunal of the Apostolic Signature. He was made Internuncio to the Netherlands and Luxembourg on 30 May 1893 and a protonotary apostolic on 10 June 1893.

On 1 October 1896, Lorenzelli was appointed Apostolic Nuncio to Bavaria, and later Titular Archbishop of Sardes on 30 November by Pope Leo XIII. He received his episcopal consecration on the following 8 December from Cardinal Mariano Rampolla, with Archbishops Ernesto Respighi and Lorenzo Passerini serving as co-consecrators, in the church of the Oblates in Tor de' Specchi. Lorenzelli was Nuncio to France from 10 May 1899 to 31 July 1904, when diplomatic relations between the Vatican and France were terminated. On 14 November 1904 he was named Archbishop of Lucca.

He was created Cardinal-Priest of Santa Croce in Gerusalemme by Pope Pius X in the consistory of 15 April 1907. Lorenzelli, following a period of five years, resigned as Archbishop on 26 March 1910 and was appointed Prefect of the Sacred Congregation of Studies on 13 February 1914. He was one of the cardinal electors who participated in the 1914 papal conclave, which selected Pope Benedict XV. Lorenzelli was also one of the three Cardinal-Presidents of the Pontifical Academy "S. Tommaso", together with Louis Billot, SJ, and Michele Lega.

As a proponent of Roman neo-Thomism, he set up a teaching of Thomistic philosophy at the University of Amsterdam.

The Cardinal died in Bucciano, at the age of 62, and is buried there.

Catholic Church titles
| Preceded by Giuseppe Francica-Nava di Bontifé | Internuncio to the Netherlands and Luxembourg; 1893–1896 | Succeeded by Aristide Rinaldini |
| Preceded by Andrea Aiuti | Nuncio to Bavaria; 1896–1899 | Succeeded by Cesare Sambucetti |
| Preceded by Domenico Ferrata | Nuncio to France; 1899–1904 | Succeeded by Bonaventura Cerretti |
| Preceded by Nicola Ghilardi | Archbishop of Lucca; 1904–1910 | Succeeded by Arturo Marchi |
| Preceded by Francesco di Paola Cassetta | Prefect of the Sacred Congregation of Studies; 1914–1915 | Succeeded by Gaetano Bisleti |
