= Károly Hornig =

Hungarian Cardinal

His Eminence Károly Hornig
- Bishop of Veszprém
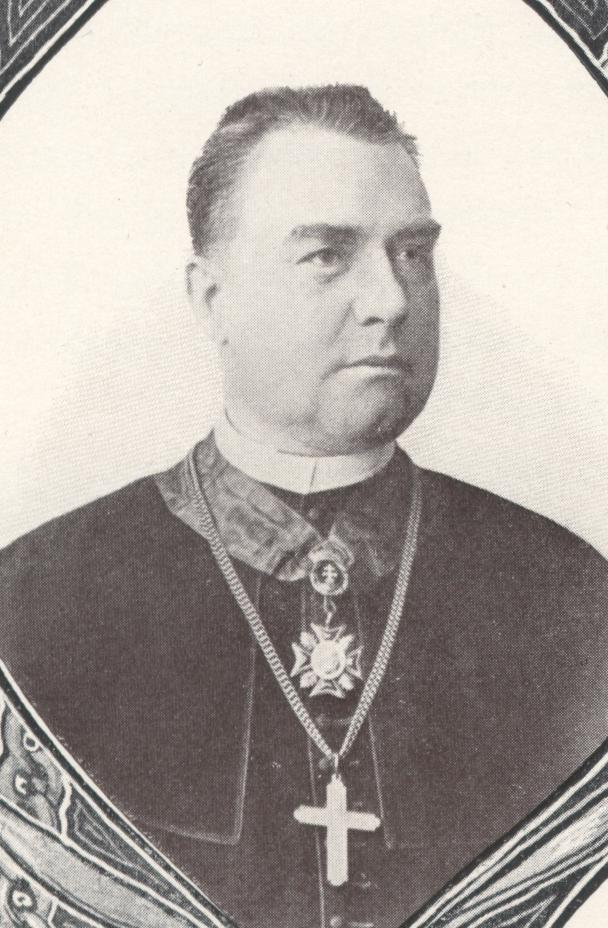
- The then-bishop in 1888.
- Church: Roman Catholic Church
- Diocese: Veszprém
- See: Veszprém
- Appointed: 1 July 1888
- Term ended: 9 February 1917
- Predecessor: Zsigmond Kovács
- Successor: Nándor Rott
- Other post: Cardinal-Priest of Sant'Agnese fuori le mura (1914-17)

Orders
- Ordination: 14 December 1862
- Consecration: 8 September 1888 by János Simor
- Created cardinal: 2 December 1912 by Pope Pius X
- Rank: Cardinal-Priest

Personal details
- Born: Károly Hornig; 10 August 1840 Buda, Kingdom of Hungary
- Died: 9 February 1917 (aged 76) Veszprém, Austria-Hungary
- Education: Royal University of Budapest
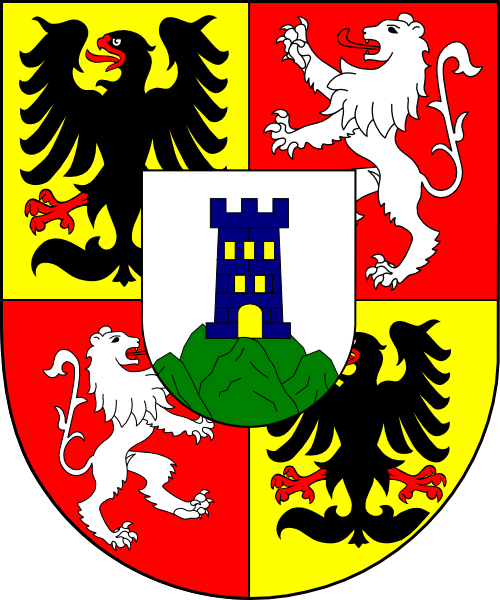
- Coat of arms

Styles of Károly Hornig
- Reference style: His Eminence
- Spoken style: Your Eminence
- Informal style: Cardinal
- See: Veszprém

Károly Hornig (10 August 1840 – 9 February 1917) was a Hungarian Cardinal of the Roman Catholic Church. He served as Bishop of Veszprém from 1888 until his death, and was elevated to the cardinalate in 1912.

== Biography ==
Károly Hornig was born in Buda, Hungary, Austrian Empire, to a noble family. He received the Sacrament of Confirmation in 1853. He received the clerical tonsure and the minor orders on 20 November 1859. Becoming a subdeacon on 23 July 1862 and a deacon two days later on 25 July, Hornig was studying at the Augustineum Imperial College in Vienna (1862-1866) when he was ordained to the priesthood on 14 December 1862. He obtained a doctorate in theology on 25 November 1869 from the Royal University of Budapest, where he also taught biblical studies from 1862 to 1869.

Hornig served as private secretary to Cardinal János Simor of Esztergom during the First Vatican Council (1869-1870), and then as Rector of the Budapest seminary from 1870 to 1878. He was named a cathedral canon as well, and was director of the archiepiscopal chancery of Esztergom from 1878 to 1888. Following his creation as Privy Chamberlain of His Holiness ad honorem, Hornig was named titular abbot of the monastery of the Blessed Virgin Mary of Babolcha. He was also a Counselor to the ministries of Worship and Public Instruction from 1882 to 1888.

On 1 July 1888, Hornig was appointed Bishop of Veszprém by Pope Leo XIII. He received his episcopal consecration on the following 8 September from Cardinal Simor, with Bishops Janos Zalka and Kornel Hidasy serving as co-consecrators.

Pope Pius X made him Cardinal-Priest of Sant'Agnese fuori le mura in the consistory of 2 December 1912. Hornig was one of the cardinal electors who participated in the 1914 papal conclave, which selected Pope Benedict XV. On 30 December 1916, he crowned King Károly I and Queen Zita of Hungary.

Cardinal Hornig died in Veszprém, at age 76, and is buried in the cathedral of the same city.

Catholic Church titles
Preceded by Sigismondo Kovács	Bishop of Veszprém; 1888–1917	Succeeded by Nándor Rott
Preceded by Georg von Kopp	Cardinal Priest of Sant'Agnese fuori le mura 1912–1917	Succeeded by Adolf Bertram
