= Louis Billot =

French Catholic cardinal and theologian (1846–1931)

The Reverend Father Louis Billot S.J.
- Priest of the Society of Jesus
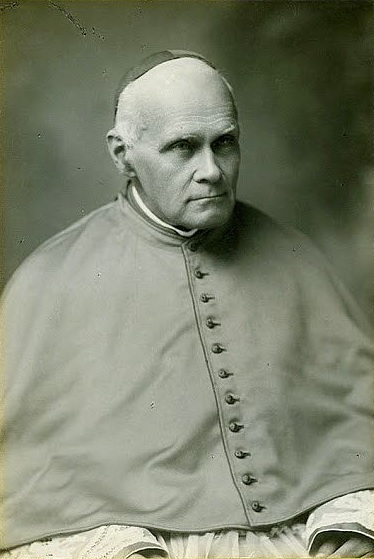
- Other post: Cardinal-Deacon of Santa Maria in Via Lata (1911–1927)

Orders
- Ordination: 22 May 1869
- Created cardinal: 27 November 1911 by Pope Pius X

Personal details
- Born: 12 January 1846 Sierck-les-Bains, Moselle, Kingdom of France
- Died: 18 December 1931 (aged 85) Ariccia, Latium, Kingdom of Italy
- Denomination: Roman Catholic
- Coat of arms

Louis Billot (English: /biːˈjoʊ/ bee-YOH, French: [lwi bijo]; 12 January 1846 in Sierck-les-Bains, Moselle, France – 18 December 1931 in Ariccia, Latium, Italy) was a French Jesuit priest and theologian. He became a cardinal in 1911 and resigned from that status in 1927, the only person to do so in the twentieth century. Billot was described as "the most important Thomistic speculative theologian of the late nineteenth century."

== Biography ==
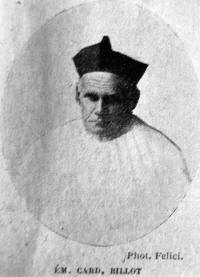
Louis Billot

Louis Billot, sometimes identified as Ludovic Billot, studied at the seminaries in Metz, Bordeaux, and Blois. Ordained a priest on 22 May 1869, he entered the Society of Jesus on 25 November in Angers. Billot did pastoral work in Paris from 1875 to 1878 and in Laval until 1879.

He taught at the Catholic University of Angers from 1879 to 1882 and made his final vows as a Jesuit on 2 February 1883, while teaching at the Jesuit Scholasticate on Jersey. In 1885, Billot became a professor of dogmatic theology at the Pontifical Gregorian University in Rome. In addition his academic post, he was named a consultor to the Holy Office on 19 June 1909.

A keen proponent of Thomistic scholasticism, Billot became a leading figure in metaphysical and speculative theology. He produced numerous published works and attracted many students. He was instrumental in drafting Pope Pius X's 1907 encyclical Pascendi dominici gregis and was a close friend of Fr. Henri Le Floch, rector of the French Seminary in Rome.

Pius X created him Cardinal Deacon of Santa Maria in Via Lata in the consistory of 27 November 1911. Billot was one of the cardinal electors in the conclaves of 1914 and 1922. During the 1914 conclave, the knowledge that two of his nephews had died fighting in the French Army affected his vote. He was also one of the three Cardinal-Presidents of the Pontifical Academy "S. Tommaso" in Rome, together with Benedetto Lorenzelli and Michele Lega. He was appointed a member of the Pontifical Biblical Commission on 6 February 1923.

== Resignation as cardinal ==
Billot's support for Action Française eventually created tension between him and the Holy See. Pope Pius XI believed that the movement used Catholicism for its own political ends and placed the movement's newspaper on the Index Librorum Prohibitorum, which meant that it was banned from all Catholic homes. Billot expressed strong disagreement with the decision, saying that the political activities of monarchist Catholics ought not to be censured by Rome.

On 13 September 1927, in a meeting with Pope Pius XI, Billot submitted a letter asking to be allowed to resign as cardinal. The Pope had a document drafted for his signature and accepted the resignation eight days later on 21 September. The Pope announced Billot's change in status to the College of Cardinals at the consistory on 19 December, saying: "The autograph letter with which he tendered his resignation adduced such high spiritual motives, and in such grave circumstances, that after much thought and prayer we decided to accept them." Billot had asked to be allowed to resign several times before.

Action Française suggested that the papal action against the newspaper had provoked Billot's action. The Holy See said his meeting with the Pope was amicable and attributed his resignation to his age (he was 81). It said he had only an academic interest in Action Française.

He was the only cardinal to resign that rank during the twentieth century, though others relinquished the rights and privileges of the office while retaining the title. (Note: Hans Hermann Groër, an Austrian monk and Archbishop of Vienna, was asked by Pope John Paul II to relinquish the rights and privileges of his cardinal's rank in 1998.)

Billot died at the Jesuit Novitiate of Galloro, near Ariccia, outside Rome, at the age of 85. He is buried in the Jesuit chapel of the Campo Verano cemetery.

== Works ==
- De ecclesiae sacramentis commentarius in tertiam partem s. Thomae, Rome 1900.

In English

- Liberalism: A Critique of Its Basic Principles and Various Forms. Arouca Press. 2019. ISBN 978-1999182717.
