= Horgești =

- Commune
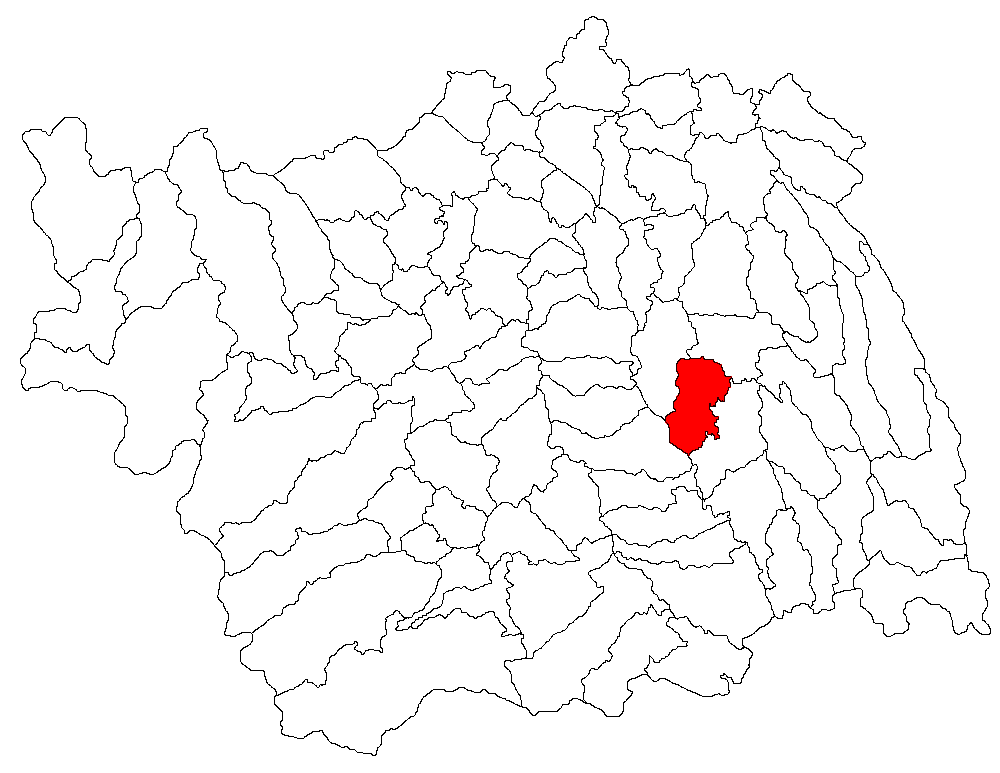
- Location in Bacău County

- Location in Romania
- Coordinates: 46.4020°N 27.0549°E
- Country: Romania
- County: Bacău

Government
  - Mayor (2024–2028): Alina Adriana Temea (PSD)
- Area: 59.29 km^{2} (22.89 sq mi)
- Elevation: 219 m (719 ft)
- Population (2021-12-01): 5,267
  - Density: 88.83/km^{2} (230.1/sq mi)
- Time zone: UTC+02:00 (EET)
  - Summer (DST): UTC+03:00 (EEST)
- Postal code: 607240
- Area code: +(40) 0234
- Vehicle reg.: BC
- Website: horgestibc.ro

Horgești is a commune in Bacău County, Western Moldavia, Romania. It is composed of eight villages: Bazga, Galeri, Horgești, Mărăscu, Răcătău-Răzeși, Răcătău de Jos, Recea, and Sohodor.
