= François-Virgile Dubillard =

Cardinal and archbishop of Chambéry

His Eminence François-Virgile Dubillard
- Archbishop of Chambéry
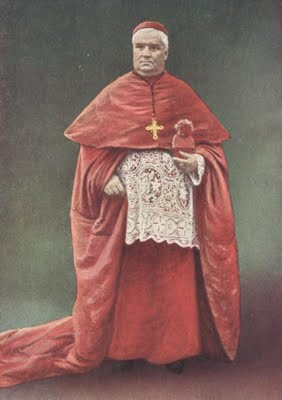
- Church: Roman Catholic Church
- Archdiocese: Chambéry
- See: Chambéry
- Appointed: 16 December 1907
- Term ended: 1 December 1914
- Predecessor: Gustave-Adolphe de Pélacot
- Successor: Dominique Castellan
- Other post: Cardinal-Priest of Santa Susanna (1911-14)
- Previous post: Bishop of Quimper (1899-1907)

Orders
- Ordination: 5 September 1869
- Consecration: 24 February 1900 by Marie-Joseph-Jean-Baptiste-André-Clément-Fulbert Petit
- Created cardinal: 27 November 1911 by Pope Pius X
- Rank: Cardinal-Priest

Personal details
- Born: François-Virgile Dubillard; 16 February 1845 Soye, Besançon, French Kingdom
- Died: 1 December 1914 (aged 69) Chambéry, French Third Republic
- Buried: Chambéry Cathedral
- Motto: Deus adjuva me
- Coat of arms

François-Virgile Dubillard (16 February 1845 in Soye near Besançon. France – 1 December 1914 in Chambéry) was a cardinal of the Catholic Church, and Archbishop of Chambéry 1907–1914.

He was made Cardinal-Priest of S. Susanna in 1911 by Pope Pius X. He was too ill to take part in the 1914 conclave.
