= Domenico Serafini =

Italian cardinal

His Eminence Domenico Serafini O.S.B. Subl.
- Prefect of the Congregation for the Propagation of the Faith
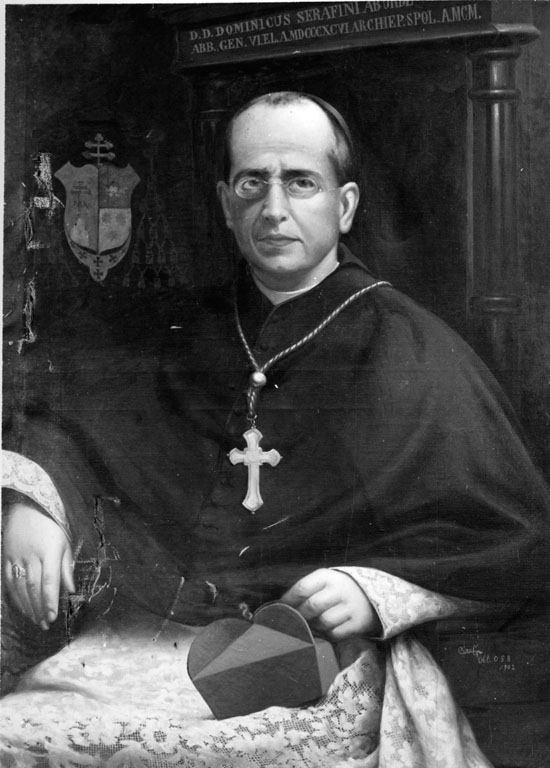
- Church: Roman Catholic Church
- Appointed: 24 March 1916
- Term ended: 5 March 1918
- Predecessor: Girolamo Maria Gotti
- Successor: Wilhelmus Marinus van Rossum
- Other post: Cardinal-Priest of Santa Cecilia (1914–18)
- Previous posts: Abbot Ordinary of Subiaco (1896–1900); President of the Subiaco Benedictine Congregation (1896–1900); Archbishop of Spoleto (1900–12); Apostolic Delegate to Mexico (1904–12); Assessor of the Congregation of the Holy Office (1911–14); Titular Archbishop of Seleucia Pieria (1912–14); Prefect of the Congregation of Religious (1916); Pro-Prefect of the Congregation of the Propagation for the Faith (1916)

Orders
- Ordination: 21 October 1877
- Consecration: 6 May 1900 by Serafino Vannutelli
- Created cardinal: 25 May 1914 by Pope Pius X
- Rank: Cardinal-Priest

Personal details
- Born: Domenico Serafini; 3 August 1852 Rome, Papal States
- Died: 5 March 1918 (aged 65) Rome, Kingdom of Italy
- Buried: Campo Verano (1918–19); Monasterio di San Benedetto di Subiaco
- Parents: Luigi Serafini; Costanza di Pietro
- Education: Collegio Romano; Pontifical Gregorian University

Styles of Domenico Serafini
- Reference style: His Eminence
- Spoken style: Your Eminence
- Informal style: Cardinal
- See: Spoleto

Domenico Serafini, O.S.B. Subl. (3 August 1852 – 5 March 1918) was an Italian Cardinal of the Roman Catholic Church who served in various pastoral, diplomatic, and curial posts, and was elevated to the cardinalate in 1914.

== Biography ==
Domenico Serafini was born in Rome, of ancient nobility, to Luigi Serafini and Costanza Di Pietro. His maternal grandfather, Giovanni Di Pietro, was a consistorial lawyer who, after becoming a widower, was ordained and named auditor of the Roman Rota by Pope Gregory XVI. Through his father, Domenico was related to Marchese Camillo Serafini, who served as the first and only Governor of the Vatican State (1929–1952).

Serafini entered the Order of Saint Benedict in 1871, joining the Cassinese congregation. He made his profession on 16 June 1874 and studied at different Benedictine houses of studies and the Pontifical Gregorian University, where he obtained his doctorates in philosophy and theology. Serafini was ordained to the priesthood on 21 October 1877.

From 1877 to 1892, he was a member of the Benedictine community at the abbey of Subiaco, later serving as its master of novices (1889–1891) and lector of theology. After being named prior of the St Scholastica monastery, Serafini became the general procurator of his religious order in Rome in 1892. He was elected Abbot of the two monasteries of Subiaco and Abbot General of the Cassinese congregation on 5 June 1896.

On 16 April 1900 Serafini was appointed Archbishop of Spoleto by Pope Leo XIII. He received his episcopal consecration on the following 6 May from Cardinal Serafino Vannutelli, with Archbishops Casimiro Gennari and Tommaso Granello, OP serving as co-consecrators. Serafini was later named Apostolic Delegate to Mexico on 4 January 1904, assessor of the Supreme Congregation of the Holy Office on 30 November 1911 and Titular Bishop of Seleucia Pieria on 2 March 1912.

Pope Pius X created him Cardinal-Priest of Santa Cecilia in Trastevere in the consistory of 25 May 1914. Some three months later, following Pius X's death, Serafini participated in the papal conclave to elect his successor. Serafini, supported by Gaetano Cardinal de Lai, was the leading candidate for the conservative cardinals, who believed he would continue the teachings and policies of Pius X. His main opponent was the more progressive Archbishop of Bologna, Giacomo della Chiesa, who was eventually elected on the tenth ballot—the final tally being della Chiesa 38, Serafini 18, and Agostino Richelmy 1—and took the name "Benedict XV".

Serafini was made Prefect of the Sacred Congregation of Religious on 27 January 1916. Upon the death of Cardinal Girolamo Maria Gotti, Benedict XV appointed him Prefect of the Sacred Congregation for the Propagation of Faith (the Propaganda Fide) on 24 March 1916, the congregation that oversees the Church's missionary work. During his tenure, the Propaganda Fide became increasingly oriented towards the changing circumstances of missions in anti-imperialist political contexts.

Cardinal Serafini died in Rome at age 65. He was originally buried in the Camp Verano cemetery in Rome before his remains were transferred to the monastery of Saint Benedict in Subiaco on 1 December 1919.
