= Louis Luçon =

His Eminence Louis Luçon
- Archbishop of Reims
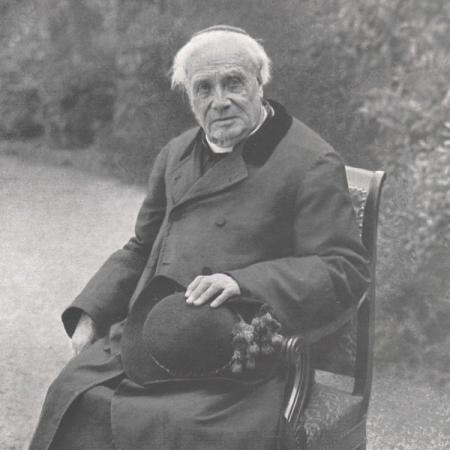
- The cardinal in 1930.
- Church: Roman Catholic Church
- Archdiocese: Reims
- See: Reims
- Appointed: 21 February 1906
- Installed: 6 April 1906
- Term ended: 28 May 1930
- Predecessor: Benoît-Marie Langénieux
- Successor: Emmanuel Célestin Suhard
- Other post: Cardinal-Priest of Santa Maria Nuova (1907–30)
- Previous post: Bishop of Belley (1888–1906)

Orders
- Ordination: 23 December 1865
- Consecration: 8 February 1888 by Charles-Emile Freppel
- Created cardinal: 16 December 1907 by Pope Pius X
- Rank: Cardinal-Priest

Personal details
- Born: Louis-Henri-Joseph Luçon; 28 October 1842 Maulévrier, French Kingdom
- Died: 28 May 1930 (aged 87) Reims, French Third Republic
- Motto: In fide et lenitate
- Coat of arms

Louis-Henri-Joseph Luçon J.C.D. S.T.D. (28 October 1842 – 28 May 1930) was a Cardinal of the Roman Catholic Church and Archbishop of Reims.

== Biography ==
Louis Henri Joseph Luçon was born in Maulévrier. He was educatated at the Seminary of Angers where he earned doctorates in theology and canon law.

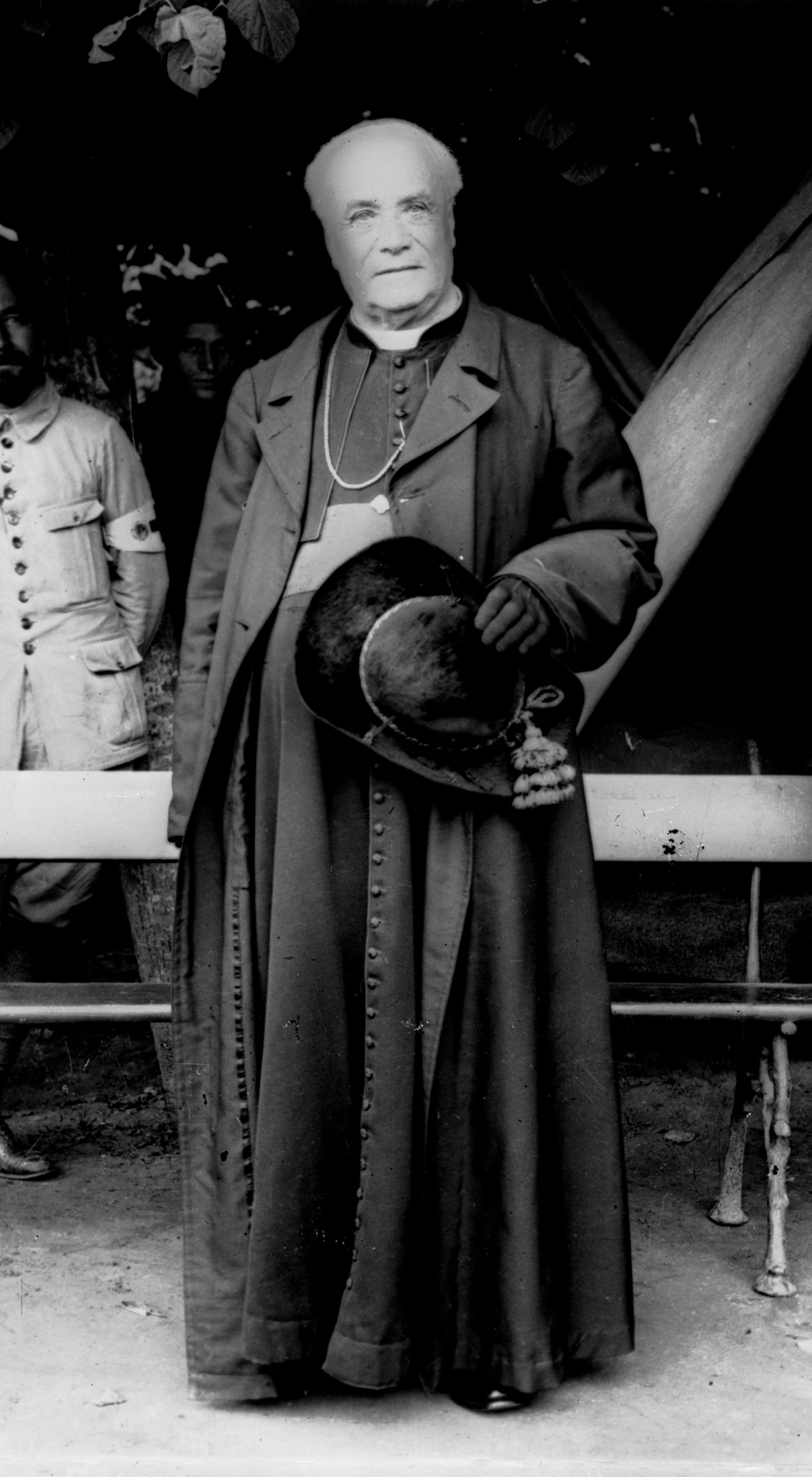
Louis Luçon.

He was ordained on 23 December 1865 in Angers. After his ordination he served as the vicar in the parish of Saint-Lambert, Angers and was chaplain of the church of San Luigi dei Francesi in Rome from 1873 until 1875. He was then moved to pastoral work in the diocese of Angers from 1875 until 1887.

He was appointed as Bishop of Belley on 25 November 1887 by Pope Leo XIII. He served in Belley until he was promoted to the metropolitan see of Reims on 21 February 1906.

In 1914, during his episcopate, the Cathedral of Reims was destroyed when struck by 288 shells in the first three months of World War I.

He was created Cardinal-Priest of S. Maria Nuova by Pope Pius X in the consistory of 16 December 1907. As a cardinal elector, he participated in the conclaves of 1914 that elected Pope Benedict XV and of 1922 that elected Pope Pius XI. During World War I he symbolised the victims of the German attack when, in spite of the destruction of his cathedral, he remained in Reims until April 1918. He died in 1930.

Catholic Church titles
Preceded by Benoit-Marie Langénieux	Archbishop of Reims; 21 February 1906 – 28 May 1930	Succeeded by Emmanuel Célestin Suhard
