= Désiré-Joseph Mercier =

Belgian cardinal (1851–1926)

His Eminence Désiré-Joseph Mercier
- Cardinal; Archbishop of Mechelen; Primate of Belgium
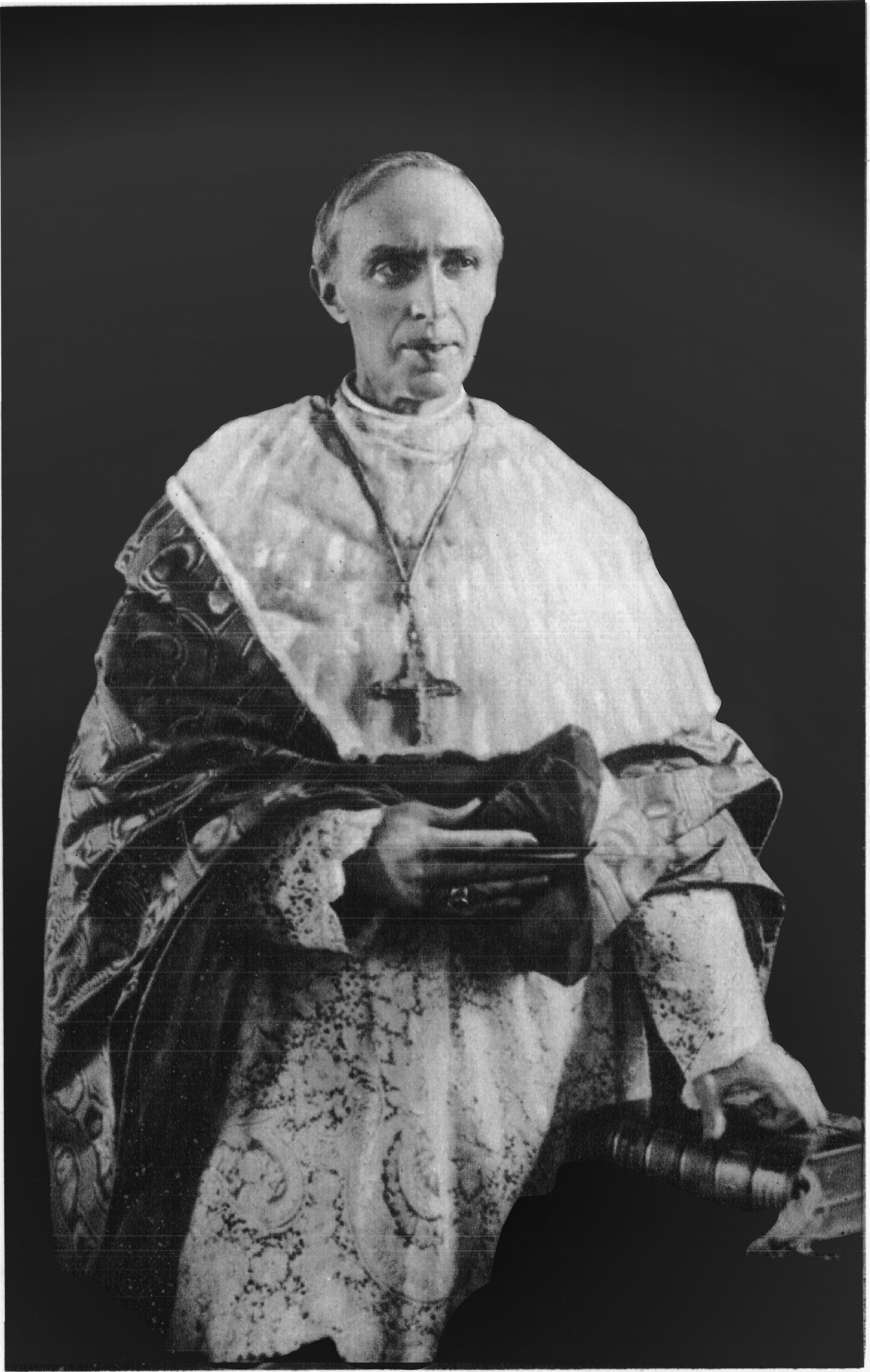
- Mercier in 1915
- Church: Catholic Church
- Archdiocese: Mechelen
- See: Mechelen
- Appointed: 21 February 1906
- Term ended: 23 January 1926
- Predecessor: Pierre-Lambert Goosens
- Successor: Jozef-Ernest van Roey
- Other post: Cardinal-Priest of San Pietro in Vincoli (1907-26)

Orders
- Ordination: 4 April 1874 by Giacomo Cattani
- Consecration: 25 March 1906 by Antonio Vico
- Created cardinal: 15 April 1907 by Pope Pius X
- Rank: Cardinal-Priest

Personal details
- Born: Désiré Félicien François Joseph Mercier; 21 November 1851 Braine-l'Alleud, Belgium
- Died: 23 January 1926 (aged 74) Brussels, Belgium
- Buried: Saint Rumbold's Cathedral
- Parents: Paul-Léon Mercier; Anne-Marie Barbe Croquet
- Motto: Apostolus Jesu Christi ("Apostle of Jesus Christ")
- Coat of arms

Désiré Félicien François Joseph Mercier (21 November 1851 – 23 January 1926) was a Belgian Catholic prelate who served as Archbishop of Mechelen from 1906 until his death in 1926. A Thomist scholar, he had several of his works translated into other European languages. He was known for his book, Les origines de la psychologie contemporaine (1897). He was elevated to the cardinalate in 1907.

Mercier is noted for his staunch resistance to the German occupation of Belgium during World War I. After the invasion, he distributed a strong pastoral letter, Patriotism and Endurance, to be read in all his churches, urging the people to keep up their spirits. He served as a model of resistance.

Styles of Désiré-Joseph Mercier
- Reference style: His Eminence
- Spoken style: Your Eminence
- Religious style: Cardinal
- Informal style: Cardinal
- See: Mechelen

== Biography ==
=== Early life and ordination ===
Mercier was born at the château du Castegier in Braine-l'Alleud, as the fifth of seven children of small business owners Paul-Léon Mercier and his wife, Anne-Marie Barbe Croquet. Three of Mercier's sisters became religious sisters. His brother Léon became a physician.

One of Mercier's maternal uncles was Adrien Croquet. In the 1860s Croquet became a missionary to the Grand Ronde Indian Reservation in western Oregon near the Pacific coast, where his surname was anglicized to Crockett. In the 1870s, a Mercier cousin, Joseph Mercier, joined their uncle Croquet in Oregon. He married a woman of one of the Native American tribes resident there. Today, several thousand descendants of Joseph and his wife are members of the tribe.

Mercier studied at the Sint‑Romboutscollege of Mechelen (1863-1868), and entered the minor seminary at Mechelen in 1868 to prepare for the church. He attended the Major Seminary, Mechelen, from 1870 to 1873.

Mercier received the clerical tonsure in 1871, and was ordained to the priesthood by Archbishop Giacomo Cattani, the nuncio to Belgium, on 4 April 1874. Mercier continued with graduate studies, obtaining his licentiate in theology (1877) and doctorate in philosophy from the University of Leuven.

=== Thomist scholarship ===
He returned to Mechelen in 1877 and taught philosophy at the minor seminary and soon after was named spiritual director of the seminarians. His comprehensive knowledge of Thomas Aquinas earned him the newly erected chair of Thomism at Leuven Catholic university in 1882. It was in this post, which he retained until 1905, that he forged a lifelong friendship with Dom Columba Marmion, an Irish Thomist. Raised to the rank of monsignor on 6 May 1887, Mercier founded the Higher Institute of Philosophy at the Leuven University in 1899, which was to be a beacon of neo-Thomist philosophy.

He founded in 1894 and edited until 1906 the Revue Néoscholastique, and wrote in a scholastic manner on metaphysics, philosophy, and psychology. Several of his works were translated into English, German, Italian, Polish, and Spanish. His most important book was Les origines de la psychologie contemporaine (1897).

=== Bishop and cardinal ===
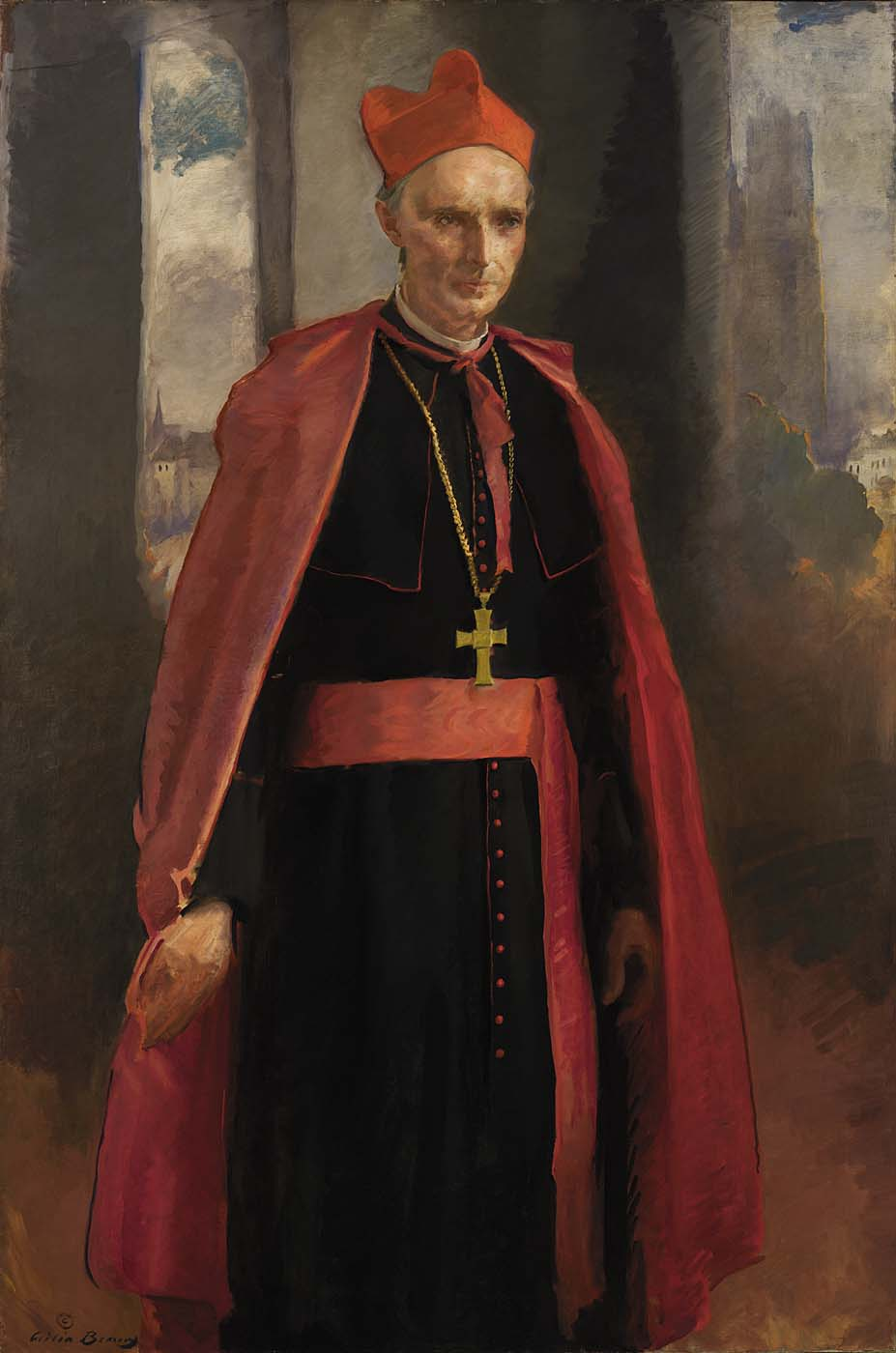
Cardinal Mercier by Cecilia Beaux, 1919

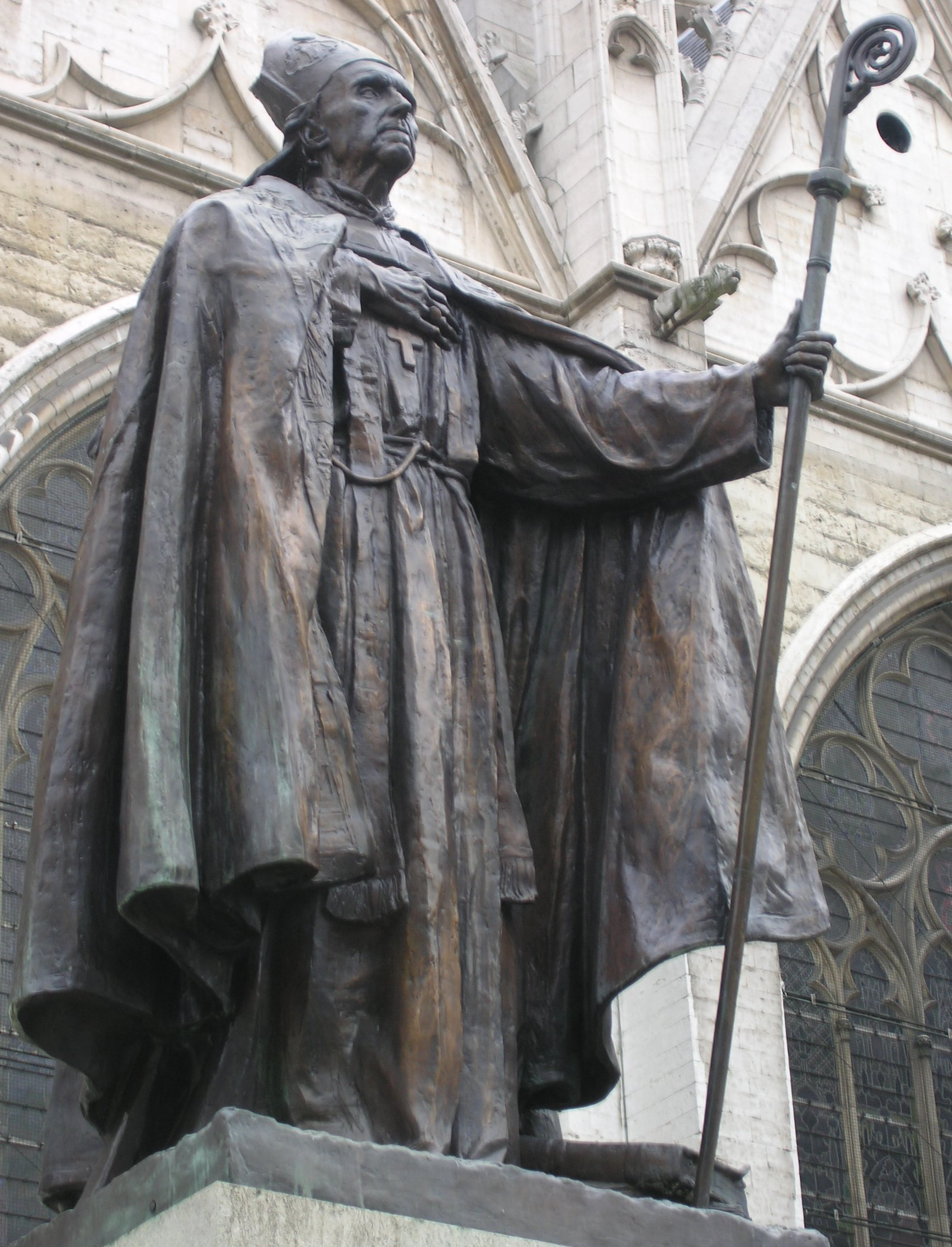
Mercier is commemorated by this statue by Égide Rombaux outside the Cathedral of St. Michael and St. Gudula in Brussels

His reputation within his field gained the recognition of Pope Pius X, and Mercier was appointed as Archbishop of Mechelen and Primate of Belgium on 7 February 1906. He received his episcopal consecration on the following 25 March from Archbishop Antonio Vico, and took as his episcopal motto: Apostolus Jesu Christi. Mercier was created cardinal priest by Pope Pius X in the consistory of 15 April 1907. Three days later Pope Pius gave him his cardinal's ring and assigned him the titular church of S. Pietro in Vincoli.

During the modernist controversy, Mercier was both progressive and antimodernist. He sought to assess the compatibility of Thomistic philosophy with rapidly developing scientific knowledge. He was a brilliant scholar, open to contemporary ideas and sufficiently respected for being able to protect scholars at Leuven, such as Bollandist Hippolyte Delehaye, from accusations of "modernism". Through his influence, Mercier prevented Albin van Hoonacker's Les douze petits prophètes traduits et commentés ["The twelve minor prophets translated and annotated"] from being placed on the Index.

Mercier was a close friend of Benedictine Lambert Beauduin and kept apprised of liturgical and ecumenical developments. From 1921 to 1926 he held the regular Malines Conversations with Anglican theologians, notably Charles Wood, 2nd Viscount Halifax, foreshadowing the Catholic Church's future dialogue with the Anglicans. Anglicanism, Mercier believed, must be "united, not absorbed".

Pope Benedict XV sent his portrait and a letter of whole-hearted support to Mercier in 1916, and at one point told him, "You saved the Church!" Mercier was one of the cardinal electors in the 1922 papal conclave, which selected Pope Pius XI.

=== World War I German occupation ===
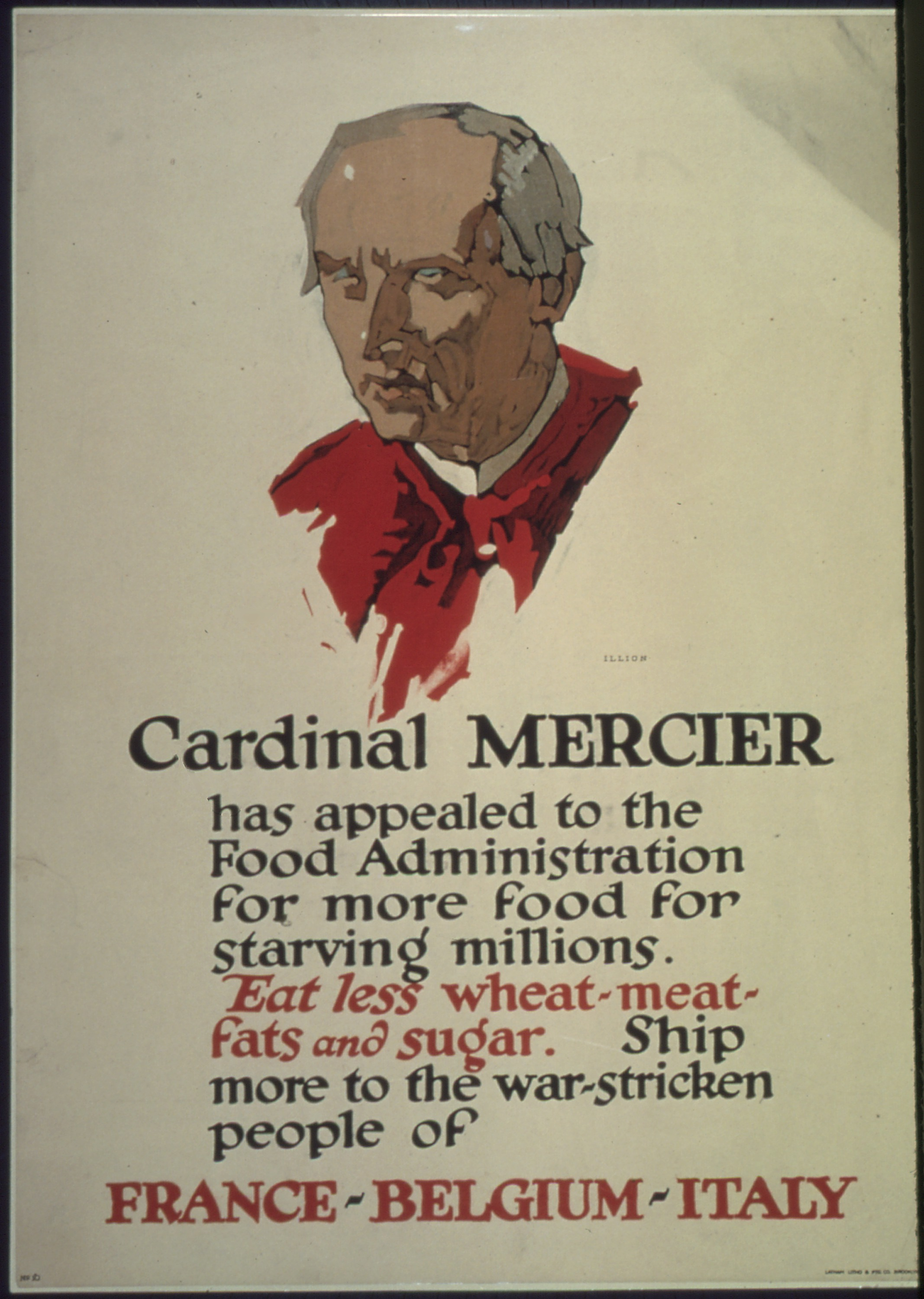
Poster from the United States Food Administration during World War I

In 1914, the German Army attempted a surprise invasion of France by invading neutral Belgium. Mercier had to leave his diocese on 20 August of that same year to attend the funeral of the late Pius X, and participate in the following conclave to elect a new pope.

Returning from the conclave Mercier passed through the Port of Le Havre, where he visited wounded Belgian, French and British troops. Once back in his archdiocese, he found Mechelen Cathedral to have been partially destroyed. In the Imperial German atrocities that ensued in the Rape of Belgium, thirteen of the priests in Mercier's diocese were killed, not to mention many civilians, by Christmas 1914. With his pastoral letter, Patriotism and Endurance, of Christmas 1914, Mercier came to personify Belgian resistance to the German occupation. The pastoral letter had to be distributed by hand as the Germans had cut off the postal service. Mercier's passionate, unflinching words were taken to heart by the suffering Belgians. He sometimes became a focus of Allied propaganda during the war. He was kept under house arrest by the Germans, and many priests who had read the letter aloud in public were arrested.

In Ireland, Cardinal Mercier's detention and indeed the German occupation was used to help recruitment for the British Army among Irish Catholics. Following the war, Mercier helped with the re-establishment of the Irish Franciscan College (St Anthony's College, Leuven), with his friend since their seminary days in Leuven and Mons, James J. Ryan. Mercier Press in Ireland is named in his honour.

=== Final years and death ===
Following World War I, Mercier undertook an excursion to raise funds to rebuild and stock a new library of the University of Leuven. The original library had been burned by the Germans in the war. In his travels to raise funds, Mercier visited New York City for the only time. In 1919, he addressed the General Convention of the Episcopal Church in Detroit, expressing gratitude for American relief efforts. Among other projects, Mercier also unsuccessfully attempted to have the League of Nations mandate of Palestine awarded to Belgium.

Mercier suffered from persistent dyspepsia. In early January 1926 he underwent surgery for a lesion of the stomach. During surgery, the cardinal held a conversation with his surgeon on anatomy while under local anesthesia .

In his final days, Mercier was visited by King Albert and Queen Elisabeth, Lord Halifax, and family members. He entered a deep coma around 2:00 p.m. on 23 January and died an hour later, at age 74. The cardinal was buried at St. Rumbolds Cathedral. He harbored great devotion to the Sacred Heart.

== Honours ==
- Papal honorary prelate, by papal decree of 8 November 1889.
- Belgium: Grand Cross in the Order of Leopold
- Grand Cross in the Order of Malta
- Grand Cross in the Order of Saints Maurice and Lazarus
- Luxemburg: Grand Cross in the Order of the Oak Crown
- Grand Cross in the Order of the Holy Sepulchre
- Grand Cross in the Order of the Double Dragon
- Poland: Grand Cross in the Order of the White Eagle
- Japan: Imperial Order of the Rising Sun
- France: Legion of Honour
- Portugal: Order of Christ
- Order of Saint Anna
- Order of Carol I
- Peru: Order of the Sun of Peru
- Spain: Order of Isabella the Catholic
- Vatican: Pro Ecclesia et Pontifice
- Red Cross Medal of the United States
- Imperial Order of the Double Dragon, Qing Dynasty China

== Views ==
=== Inter-Belgian relations ===
Mercier is known for favouring French speakers and opposing the use of the Dutch language. Though in general social-minded, he was blind to the social aspects of the Flemish Movement and opposed many of its aims. Two examples. (1) Claiming that Dutch could never be a full-fledged cultural language, he fought all attempts to have Flemish high school and university students educated in their native Dutch. He relented only when overwhelmed by the political pressure the Flemish Movement was generating. He managed to have Pope Benedict XV address him a letter in which he admonished priests that they should not address arguments extraneous to their supernatural commitment nor publish on secular subjects without their superior's permission. Mercier promptly published this letter.

=== Church and science ===
Mercier recognized the mathematical talent of Georges Lemaître as a young seminarian, and urged him to study Einstein's theories of relativity. Lemaître became an early expert in general relativity as it applied to cosmological questions.

He went on to propose an expanding model of the universe, based on both Einstein's and de Sitter's models. Abbé Georges Lemaître developed his "primeval atom" hypothesis, together with researchers of the University of Leuven, and Gamow, Alpher and Herman into the better known Big Bang theory of the origin of the universe.

=== Marian devotion ===
Cardinal Mercier spread the spirituality of Louis de Montfort and was the main herald for his canonization. In 1925, he proposed to Catholic bishops to approve a prayer including the doctrine of Mary's Universal Mediation.

Catholic Church titles
Preceded by Pierre-Lambert Goosens	18th Archbishop of Mechelen; 1906–1926	Succeeded by Jozef-Ernest van Roey
