= Pietro Maffi =

Catholic cardinal

His Eminence Pietro Maffi
- Archbishop of Pisa
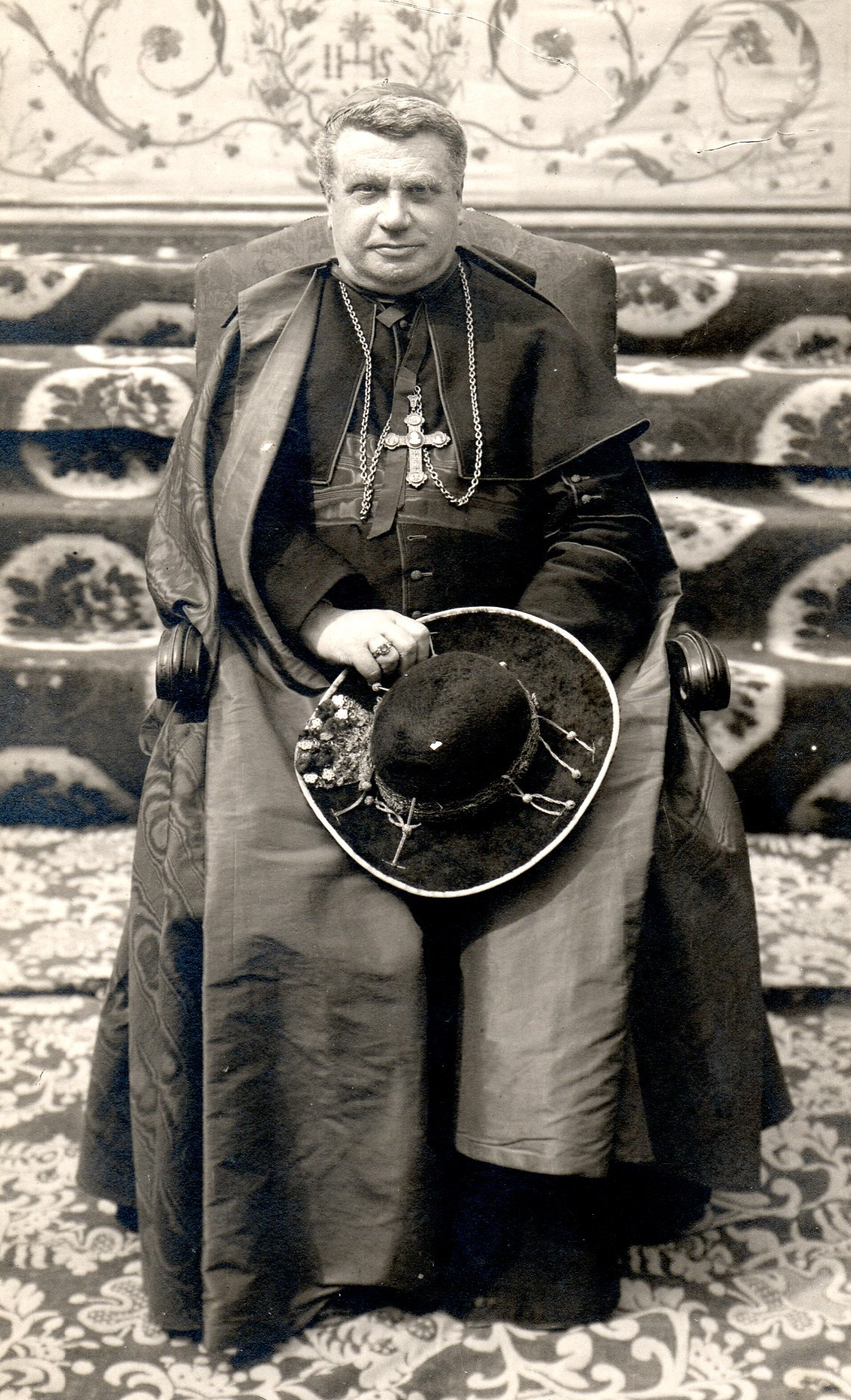
- Church: Roman Catholic Church
- Archdiocese: Pisa
- See: Pisa
- Appointed: 22 June 1903
- Installed: 10 January 1904
- Term ended: 17 March 1931
- Predecessor: Ferdinando Capponi
- Successor: Gabriele Vettori
- Other post: Cardinal-Priest of San Crisogono (1907-31)
- Previous posts: Titular Bishop of Caesarea (1902-03); Auxiliary Bishop of Ravenna (1902-03); Apostolic Administrator of San Miniato (1906-08)

Orders
- Ordination: 16 April 1881
- Consecration: 11 June 1902 by Lucido Maria Parocchi
- Created cardinal: 15 April 1907 by Pope Pius X
- Rank: Cardinal-Priest

Personal details
- Born: Pietro Maffi; 12 October 1858 Corteolona, Kingdom of Lombardy–Venetia
- Died: 17 March 1931 (aged 72) Pisa, Kingdom of Italy
- Motto: In fide et lenitate
- Coat of arms

Styles of Pietro Maffi
- Reference style: His Eminence
- Spoken style: Your Eminence
- Religious style: Cardinal
- Informal style: Cardinal
- See: Pisa

Pietro Maffi (12 October 1858 – 17 March 1931) was an Italian Cardinal of the Roman Catholic Church. He served as Archbishop of Pisa from 1903 until his death, and was elevated to the cardinalate in 1907.

He was also a scientist and astronomer.

== Biography ==
Born in Corteolona, Pietro Maffi studied at the seminary in Pavia (from where he obtained his doctorate in theology) before being ordained to the priesthood in 1881. He was raised to the rank of Privy Chamberlain of His Holiness that same year, and taught philosophy and sciences at the Pavia seminary, of which he was also rector. Maffi founded the meteorological observatory and the Museum of Natural History of Pavia, as well as serving as editor and director of Rivista di scienze fisiche e matematiche. Maffi was later named Pro-Vicar General of Pavia and pro-synodal examiner, doctor honoris causa of theological college of Parma, and a supernumerary member of its scientific academy. In 1901, Maffi was made Vicar General of Ravenna and the prefect of its seminary's studies, becoming Apostolic Administrator of the archdiocese on 26 April 1902.

On 9 June 1902, Maffi was appointed Auxiliary Bishop of Ravenna and Titular Bishop of Caesarea in Mauretania by Pope Leo XIII. He received his episcopal consecration on the following 11 June from Cardinal Lucido Parocchi, with Archbishops Felix-Marie de Neckere and Diomede Panici serving as co-consecrators, at the Basilica of Saint Paul Outside the Walls in Rome. Maffi was later advanced to Archbishop of Pisa on 22 June 1903.

In addition to his pastoral duties, he was named director and administrator of the Vatican Observatory on 30 November 1904.

Pope Pius X created him Cardinal Priest of San Crisogono in the consistory of 15 April 1907. Maffi participated in and was a chief candidate in the 1914 papal conclave, which selected Pope Benedict XV.

During World War I, Maffi was known as the "War Cardinal" for his support of a fight-to-the-finish policy.

He also participated in the 1922 conclave, which selected Pope Pius XI. In a 1925 pastoral letter, the Archbishop issued a scathing attack on the Fascist government, which subsequently halted the letter's publication.

A close friend of the Royal Family, in 1930, he presided at the marriage of Crown Prince Umberto of Italy and Princess Marie-José of Belgium.

The Cardinal continued to write numerous scientific and astronomical works, the best known of which is Nei cieli. His love for science once provoked Pisa's outrage, when Maffi proposed to erect a statue of Galileo Galilei, the scientist condemned by the Inquisition as a heretic. Maffi had authenicated a document as the work of Galileo, but this was later found to be incorrect.

Maffi died in Pisa, at age 72. He is buried at the Cathedral of Pisa.

== Publications ==
- Primo saggio di discorsi sacri: (postumo) (1918)
- Ai Fedeli per Gli Infedeli (1921)
- Lettere Pastorali Omelie e Discorsi: Volumes I-II (1921)
- Conferenze geronimiane: Roma - Dicembre (1921)
- Il Credo di Dante nella Divina Commedia: Pastorale per la ... (1922)
- Nei cieli: pagine di astronomia popolare (1923)
- Conversazioni manzoniane col mio clero: gennaio-giugno (1923)
- Conversazioni manzoniane col mio clero (1923)
- Nell'inaugurazione del Tempio Voltiano donato alla sua Como (1928)

Catholic Church titles
Preceded by Ferdinando Capponi	Archbishop of Pisa; 1903–1931	Succeeded by Gabriele Vettori
