= 1914 conclave =

Election of Catholic Pope Benedict XV

Papal conclave August–September 1914

Dates and location
- 31 August – 3 September 1914; Sistine Chapel, Apostolic Palace, Kingdom of Italy

Key officials
- Dean: Serafino Vannutelli
- Sub-dean: Antonio Agliardi
- Camerlengo: Francesco Salesio Della Volpe
- Protopriest: José Sebastião Neto
- Protodeacon: Francesco Salesio Della Volpe
- Secretary: Tommaso Pio Boggiani

Election
- Electors: 57 (list)
- Candidates: Domenico Serafini
- Ballots: 10

Elected pope
- Giacomo della Chiesa; Name taken: Benedict XV
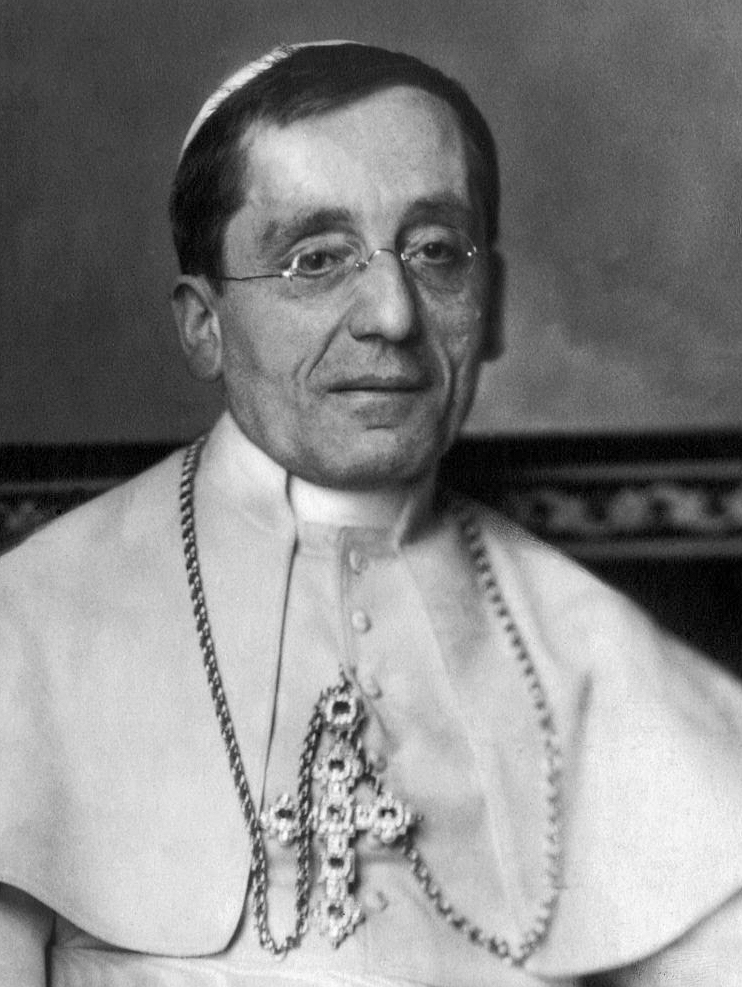

A conclave was held from 31 August to 3 September 1914 to elect a new pope in succession to Pius X, who had died on 20 August. Of the 65 members of the College of Cardinals, all but eight attended. (Note: The current 80-year-old age limit for cardinal electors was introduced by Pope Paul VI in 1970.) On the tenth ballot, the conclave elected Cardinal Giacomo della Chiesa, the archbishop of Bologna. After accepting his election, he took the name Benedict XV.

This was the first conclave to include a cardinal from South America: Cardinal Joaquim Cavalcanti, Archbishop of Rio de Janeiro.

== Political context ==
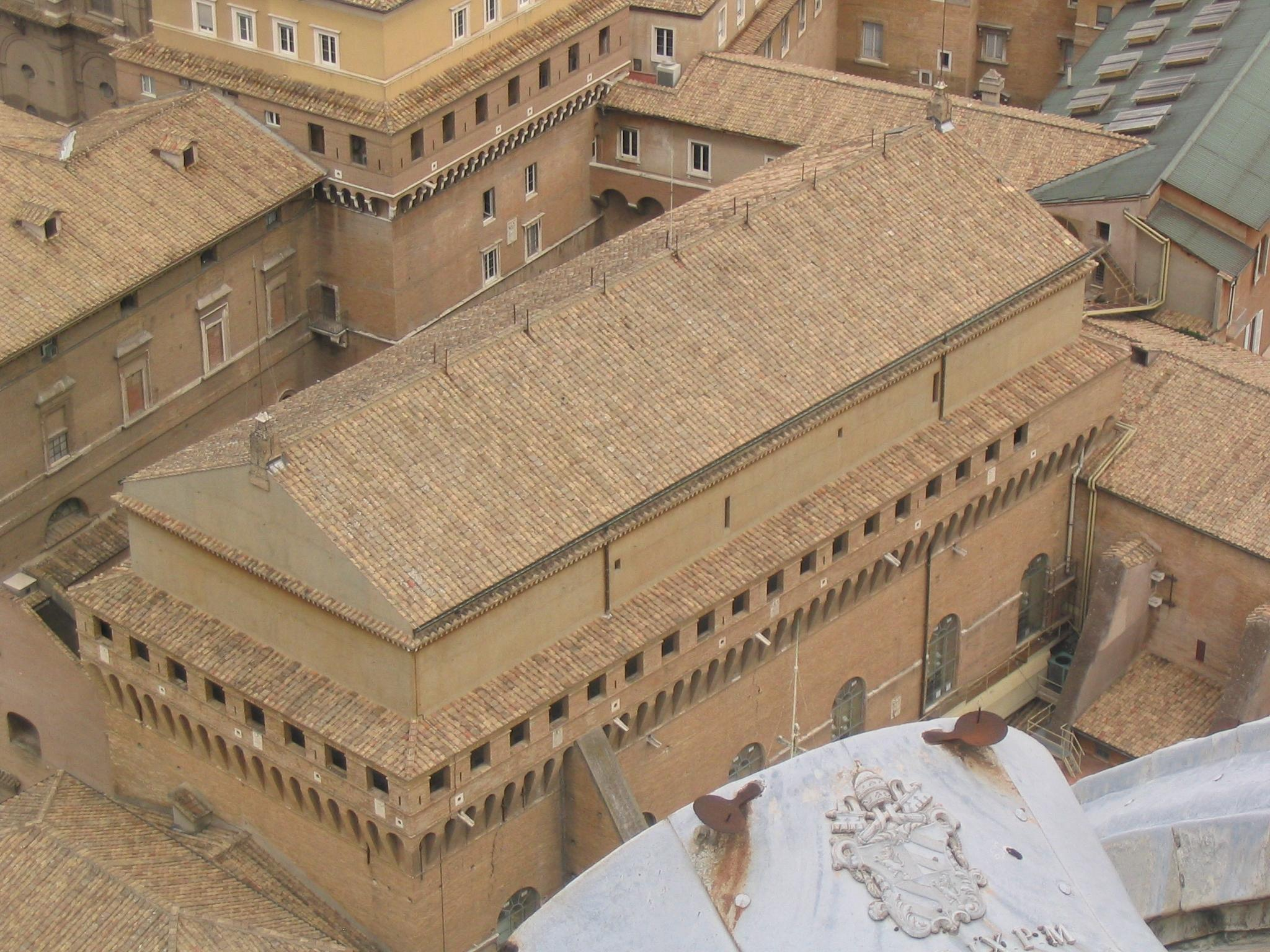
Sistine Chapel, the location of the 1914 conclave that elected Benedict XV

Europe was already at war, and the new pope would face the question of maintaining neutrality or assuming moral leadership. Catholic Belgium and France were attacked by Protestant Germany, which was supported by Catholic Austria-Hungary, while Protestant United Kingdom of Great Britain and Ireland (including Catholic Ireland) and Orthodox Russia sided with France.

The conclave brought together cardinals from the combatant nations, including Károly Hornig from Austria-Hungary, Louis Luçon from France, Felix von Hartmann from Germany, and three from the United Kingdom of Great Britain and Ireland–Francis Bourne, Michael Logue, and Francis Aidan Gasquet. The Belgian Désiré-Joseph Mercier needed permission from the Emperor of Germany to leave his country.

Despite the fact that some cardinals had found it impossible to reach Rome in time to participate in earlier conclaves, the revised set of rules promulgated by Pius X in the Vacante Sede Apostolica on 25 December 1904 required the cardinals to wait only ten days after the death of the pope before starting a conclave. Of the three cardinals who traveled from the United States, James Gibbons of Baltimore and William O'Connell of Boston did not reach Rome in time to participate in the conclave, nor did Louis-Nazaire Bégin of Quebec. Five more were too ill or too frail.

== Veto abolished ==
Pope Pius X had issued two apostolic constitutions on the subject of papal conclaves. The first, Commissum Nobis of 20 January 1904, eliminated any secular monarch's claim to a veto over a candidate for election. It established that anyone who attempted to introduce a veto in the conclave would incur automatic excommunication. For the first time in centuries, the cardinals faced no external restraint on their authority.

== Balloting ==
The conclave itself assembled in the Sistine Chapel on 31 August. From the beginning of the conclave, it was clear that there were only three possible winners. Domenico Serafini, a Benedictine and assessor at the Holy Office, won the support of the Curia to continue Pius X's anti-modernist campaign as his chief priority. However, many other cardinals, such as Carlo Ferrari and Désiré Mercier, believed that a pope with a different focus was needed and supported Pietro Maffi, the archbishop of Pisa, considered very liberal but tainted by being close to the House of Savoy. Giacomo della Chiesa, the archbishop of Bologna, stood intermediate between Maffi and Serafini, but in the early ballots he was equal with Maffi and seemed to be winning some support from conservative factions. Della Chiesa drew ahead by five votes after the fourth ballot, and once it became clear Maffi had no hope whatsoever of gaining two-thirds of the votes, Serafini became Della Chiesa's opponent. By 3 September 1914, on the tenth ballot, all of Maffi's supporters had switched to Della Chiesa, who was elected pope. He took the name Benedict XV.

Reportedly, Della Chiesa had been elected by one vote. According to the rules in force at the time, the ballot papers had a numbering on the reverse side, so that, if the election was decided by only one vote, it could be checked whether or not the elected person had voted for himself, in which case the election would be void. According to that account, Cardinal Rafael Merry del Val, who had been Pius X's Secretary of State, insisted that the ballots be checked to ensure that Della Chiesa had not voted for himself – he had not. When the cardinals offered their homage to the new pope, Benedict XV allegedly said to Cardinal Merry del Val: "The stone that the builders rejected has become the cornerstone," to which the unabashed Merry del Val replied with the next verse of Psalm 118: "This is the Lord's doing; it is marvelous in our eyes."

Cardinal Merry del Val was not reappointed as secretary of state by the new pope, but was named secretary of the Supreme Sacred Congregation of the Holy Office (then the head of that dicastery, because the popes themselves retained the office of prefect of the Holy Office, leaving its daily administration to the secretary).

== See also ==
Cardinal electors by region
Region	Number
Italy	33
Rest of Europe	22
North America	1
South America	1
Asia	0
Oceania	0
Africa	0
Total	57

- Cardinal electors for the 1914 conclave
