= Cardinal electors for the 1922 conclave =

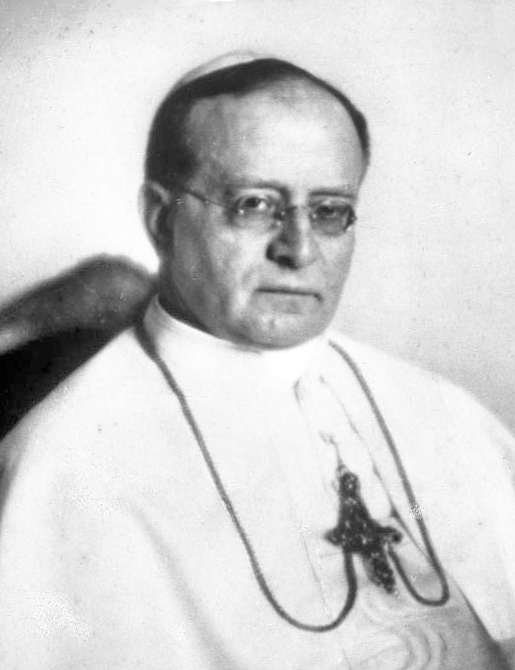
Cardinal Achille Ratti was elected Pope Pius XI by the 1922 conclave on 6 February.

The papal conclave of 1922 was convened to elect a pope, the leader of the Catholic Church, to succeed Pope Benedict XV following his death on 22 January 1922.

Of the 60 members of the College of Cardinals at the time of Benedict XV's death, 53 participated in the subsequent conclave. The late arrival of several electors led Pope Pius XI, a month after his election, to extend the time between a pope's death and the start of a conclave.

Of the 53 electors, 6 were cardinal bishops, 40 were cardinal priests, and 7 were cardinal deacons; 5 had been created cardinals by Pope Leo XIII, 22 by Pope Pius X, and 26 by Pope Benedict XV; 25 worked in the service of the Holy See (such as in the Roman Curia), and 28 were in pastoral ministry outside Rome. The oldest cardinal elector in the conclave was Vincenzo Vannutelli, at the age of 85, and the youngest was Alessio Ascalesi, at the age of 49.

The cardinal electors entered the Sistine Chapel to begin the conclave on 2 February 1922. On 6 February, after fourteen ballots over five days, they elected Cardinal Achille Ratti, the archbishop of Milan, who took the papal name Pius XI.

== Cardinal electors ==
The data below are as of 22 January 1922, the date on which the Holy See became vacant. Cardinals belonging to institutes of consecrated life or to societies of apostolic life are indicated by the relevant post-nominal letters.

* Elected pope

| Rank | Name | Country | Born | Order | Consistory | Office |
|---|---|---|---|---|---|---|
| 1 | Vincenzo Vannutelli | Italy | 5 December 1836 (age 85) | CB | 30 December 1889; Leo XIII | Prefect of the Congregation of Ceremonies, Datary of the Apostolic Dataria (Dean) |
| 2 | Gaetano de Lai | Italy | 26 July 1853 (age 68) | CB | 16 December 1907; Pius X | Secretary of the Sacred Consistorial Congregation (Vice-Dean) |
| 3 | Antonio Vico | Italy | 9 January 1847 (age 75) | CB | 27 November 1911; Pius X | Prefect of the Sacred Congregation of Rites |
| 4 | Gennaro Granito Pignatelli di Belmonte | Italy | 10 April 1851 (age 70) | CB | 27 November 1911; Pius X | Cardinal Bishop of Albano |
| 5 | Basilio Pompilj | Italy | 16 April 1858 (age 63) | CB | 27 November 1911; Pius X | Vicar General of Rome |
| 6 | Giovanni Cagliero SDB | Italy | 11 January 1838 (age 84) | CB | 6 December 1915; Benedict XV | Cardinal Bishop of Frascati |
| 7 | Michael Logue | Ireland; United Kingdom | 1 October 1840 (age 81) | CP | 16 January 1893; Leo XIII | Archbishop of Armagh |
| 8 | Giuseppe Francica-Nava de Bontifè | Italy | 23 July 1846 (age 75) | CP | 19 June 1899; Leo XIII | Archbishop of Catania |
| 9 | Agostino Richelmy | Italy | 29 November 1850 (age 71) | CP | 19 June 1899; Leo XIII | Archbishop of Turin |
| 10 | Bartolomeo Bacilieri | Italy | 28 March 1842 (age 79) | CP | 15 April 1901; Leo XIII | Bishop of Verona |
| 11 | Rafael Merry del Val | Italy | 10 October 1865 (age 56) | CP | 9 November 1903; Pius X | Secretary of the Congregation of the Holy Office |
| 12 | Ottavio Cagiano de Azevedo | Italy | 7 November 1845 (age 76) | CP | 11 December 1905; Pius X | Chancellor of the Apostolic Chancery |
| 13 | Pietro Maffi | Italy | 12 October 1858 (age 63) | CP | 11 December 1905; Pius X | Archbishop of Pisa |
| 14 | Alessandro Lualdi | Italy | 12 August 1858 (age 63) | CP | 15 April 1907; Pius X | Archbishop of Palermo |
| 15 | Désiré-Joseph Mercier | Belgium | 21 November 1851 (age 70) | CP | 15 April 1907; Pius X | Archbishop of Mechelen |
| 16 | Pietro Gasparri | Italy | 5 May 1852 (age 69) | CP | 16 December 1907; Pius X | Cardinal Secretary of State (Camerlengo) |
| 17 | Louis Luçon | France | 28 October 1842 (age 79) | CP | 16 December 1907; Pius X | Archbishop of Reims |
| 18 | Pierre Andrieu | France | 7 December 1849 (age 72) | CP | 16 December 1907; Pius X | Archbishop of Bordeaux |
| 19 | António Mendes Belo | Portugal | 18 June 1842 (age 79) | CP | 27 November 1911; Pius X | Patriarch of Lisbon |
| 20 | Francis Bourne | United Kingdom | 23 March 1861 (age 60) | CP | 27 November 1911; Pius X | Archbishop of Westminster |
| 21 | Willem Marinus van Rossum CSSR | Netherlands | 3 September 1854 (age 67) | CP | 27 November 1911; Pius X | Prefect of the Congregation for Propagation of the Faith |
| 22 | János Csernoch | Hungary | 18 June 1852 (age 69) | CP | 27 November 1911; Pius X | Archbishop of Esztergom |
| 23 | Friedrich Gustav Piffl | Austria | 15 October 1864 (age 57) | CP | 25 May 1914; Pius X | Archbishop of Vienna |
| 24 | Alfonso Mistrangelo SchP | Italy | 26 April 1852 (age 69) | CP | 25 May 1914; Pius X | Archbishop of Florence |
| 25 | Andreas Frühwirth OP | Austria | 21 August 1845 (age 76) | CP | 6 December 1915; Benedict XV | Cardinal Priest of Santi Cosma e Damiano |
| 26 | Raffaele Scapinelli di Leguigno | Italy | 25 April 1858 (age 63) | CP | 6 December 1915; Benedict XV | Cardinal Priest of San Girolamo dei Croati |
| 27 | Pietro La Fontaine | Italy | 29 November 1860 (age 61) | CP | 4 December 1916; Benedict XV | Patriarch of Venice |
| 28 | Vittorio Ranuzzi de' Bianchi | Italy | 14 July 1857 (age 64) | CP | 4 December 1916; Benedict XV | Papal majordomo |
| 29 | Donato Sbarretti | Italy | 12 November 1856 (age 65) | CP | 4 December 1916; Benedict XV | Prefect of the Congregation of the Council |
| 30 | Louis-Ernest Dubois | France | 1 September 1856 (age 65) | CB | 4 December 1916; Benedict XV | Archbishop of Paris |
| 31 | Tommaso Pio Boggiani OP | Italy | 19 January 1863 (age 59) | CP | 4 December 1916; Benedict XV | Archbishop Emeritus of Genoa |
| 32 | Alessio Ascalesi CPPS | Italy | 22 October 1872 (age 49) | CP | 4 December 1916; Benedict XV | Archbishop of Benevento |
| 33 | Louis-Joseph Maurin | France | 15 February 1859 (age 62) | CP | 4 December 1916; Benedict XV | Archbishop of Lyon |
| 34 | Adolf Bertram | Germany | 14 March 1859 (age 62) | CP | 4 December 1916; Benedict XV | Archbishop of Breslau |
| 35 | Augusto Silj | Italy | 9 July 1846 (age 75) | CP | 4 December 1916; Benedict XV | Prefect of the Apostolic Signatura |
| 36 | Juan Soldevila y Romero | Spain | 20 October 1843 (age 78) | CP | 15 December 1919; Benedict XV | Archbishop of Zaragoza |
| 37 | Teodoro Valfre di Bonzo | Italy | 21 August 1853 (age 68) | CP | 15 December 1919; Benedict XV | Prefect of the Congregation for Religious |
| 38 | Aleksander Kakowski | Poland | 5 February 1862 (age 68) | CP | 15 December 1919; Benedict XV | Archbishop of Warsaw |
| 39 | Edmund Dalbor | Poland | 5 February 1862 (age 68) | CP | 15 December 1919; Benedict XV | Archbishop of Gniezno and Poznań |
| 40 | Francesco Ragonesi | Italy | 21 December 1850 (age 71) | CP | 7 March 1921; Benedict XV | Apostolic Nuncio Emeritus to Spain |
| 41 | Michael von Faulhaber | Germany | 5 March 1869 (age 52) | CP | 7 March 1921; Benedict XV | Archbishop of Munich and Freising |
| 42 | Juan Benlloch i Vivó | Spain | 29 December 1864 (age 57) | CP | 7 March 1921; Benedict XV | Archbishop of Burgos |
| 43 | Francisco Vidal y Barraquer | Spain | 3 October 1868 (age 53) | CP | 7 March 1921; Benedict XV | Archbishop of Tarragona |
| 44 | Karl Joseph Schulte | Germany | 14 September 1871 (age 50) | CP | 7 March 1921; Benedict XV | Archbishop of Cologne |
| 45 | Giovanni Tacci | Italy | 12 November 1863 (age 58) | CP | 13 June 1921; Benedict XV | Prefecture of the Pontifical Household |
| 46 | Achille Ratti* | Italy | 31 May 1857 (age 64) | CP | 13 June 1921; Benedict XV | Archbishop of Milan |
| 47 | Gaetano Bisleti | Italy | 20 March 1856 (age 65) | CD | 27 November 1911; Pius X | Prefect of the Congregation of Seminaries and Universities (Protodeacon) |
| 48 | Louis Billot SJ | France | 12 January 1846 (age 76) | CD | 27 November 1911; Pius X | Cardinal Deacon of Santa Maria in Via Lata |
| 49 | Michele Lega | France | 1 January 1860 (age 62) | CD | 25 May 1914; Pius X | Prefect of the Congregation of the Discipline of the Sacraments |
| 50 | Francis Aidan Gasquet | United Kingdom | 5 October 1846 (age 75) | CD | 25 May 1914; Pius X | Archivist of the Vatican Secret Archive, Librarian of the Vatican Library |
| 51 | Niccolò Marini | Italy | 20 August 1843 (age 78) | CD | 4 December 1916; Benedict XV | Secretary Emeritus of the Congregation for the Oriental Churches |
| 52 | Oreste Giorgi | Italy | 19 May 1856 (age 65) | CD | 4 December 1916; Benedict XV | Major Penitentiary of the Apostolic Penitentiary |
| 53 | Camillo Laurenti | Italy | 20 November 1861 (age 60) | CD | 21 June 1921; Benedict XV | Secretary of the Congregation for Propagation of the Faith |

=== Not in attendance ===
| Rank | Name | Country | Born | Order | Consistory | Office | Reason for absence |
|---|---|---|---|---|---|---|---|
| 1 | William Henry O'Connell | United States | 8 December 1859 (age 62) | CP | 27 November 1911; Pius X | Archbishop of Boston | Did not arrive in time |
| 2 | Dennis Joseph Dougherty | United States | 16 August 1865 (age 56) | CP | 7 March 1921; Benedict XV | Archbishop of Philadelphia | Did not arrive in time |
| 3 | Louis-Nazaire Bégin | Canada | 10 January 1840 (age 82) | CP | 25 May 1914; Pius X | Archbishop of Quebec | Did not arrive in time |
| 4 | José María Martín de Herrera y de la Iglesia | Spain | 26 August 1835 (age 86) | CP | 19 April 1897; Leo XIII | Archbishop of Santiago de Compostela | Illness |
| 5 | Lev Skrbenský z Hříště | Czechoslovakia | 12 June 1863 (age 58) | CP | 15 April 1901; Leo XIII | Archbishop of Olomouc | Illness |
| 6 | Giuseppe Antonio Ermenegildo Prisco | Italy | 8 September 1833 (age 88) | CP | 30 November 1896; Leo XIII | Archbishop of Naples | Illness |
| 7 | Joaquim Arcoverde de Albuquerque Cavalcanti | Brazil | 17 January 1850 (age 72) | CP | 11 December 1905; Pius X | Archbishop of São Sebastião do Rio de Janeiro | Did not attempt the journey |

== Cardinal electors by country ==
The 53 attending cardinal electors were from 12 countries. The countries with the greatest number of cardinal electors were Italy (thirty), France (six), and, jointly, Germany and Spain (three each).

* Country of elected pope

Cardinal electors by country
| Country | Continent | Number |
|---|---|---|
| Austria | Europe | 2 |
| Belgium | Europe | 1 |
| France | Europe | 6 |
| Germany | Europe | 3 |
| Hungary | Europe | 1 |
| Ireland (Note: Michael Logue was Archbishop of Armagh, with territory in both Ireland and the United Kingdom.) | Europe | 1 |
| Italy* | Europe | 30 |
| Netherlands | Europe | 1 |
| Poland | Europe | 2 |
| Portugal | Europe | 1 |
| Spain | Europe | 3 |
| United Kingdom | Europe | 3 |
| Total | | 53 |

== See also ==
- Cardinals created by Leo XIII
- Cardinals created by Pius X
- Cardinals created by Benedict XV
- Cardinal electors for the 1914 conclave
- Cardinal electors for the 1939 conclave
