= Cardinals created by Benedict XV =

Catholic appointments from 1915 to 1921

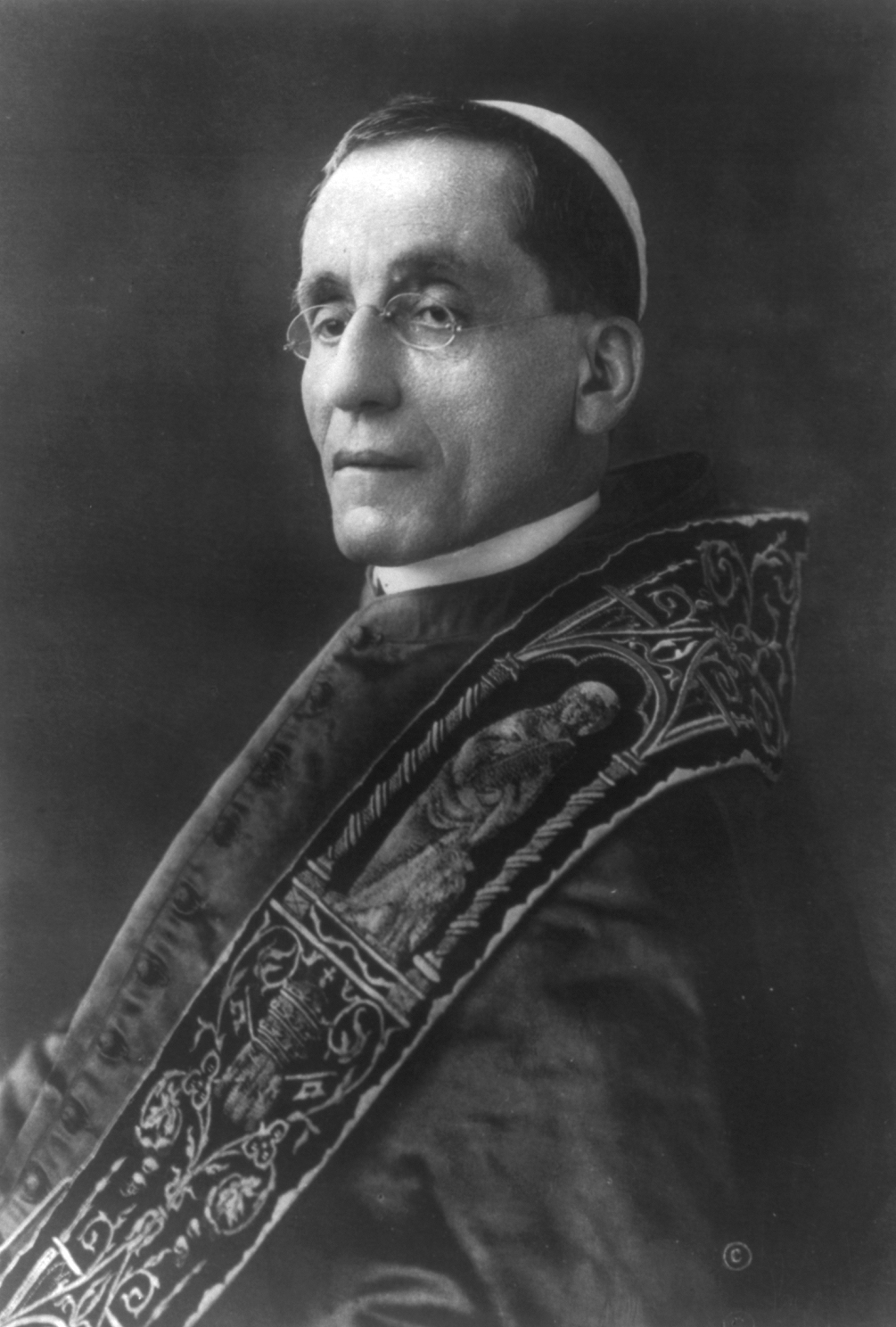
Pope Benedict XV (1854–1922)

Pope Benedict XV (r. 1914–1922) created 32 cardinals in five consistories over less than seven and a half years, with a three year gap during the worst fighting of the First World War. Nineteen of the 32 were Italian, twelve came from other European countries, and the lone non-European was Dennis Dougherty from the United States. They included Achille Ratti, his successor as Pope Pius XI and one name, that of the German Adolf Bertram, reserved in pectore for three years.

== 6 December 1915 ==
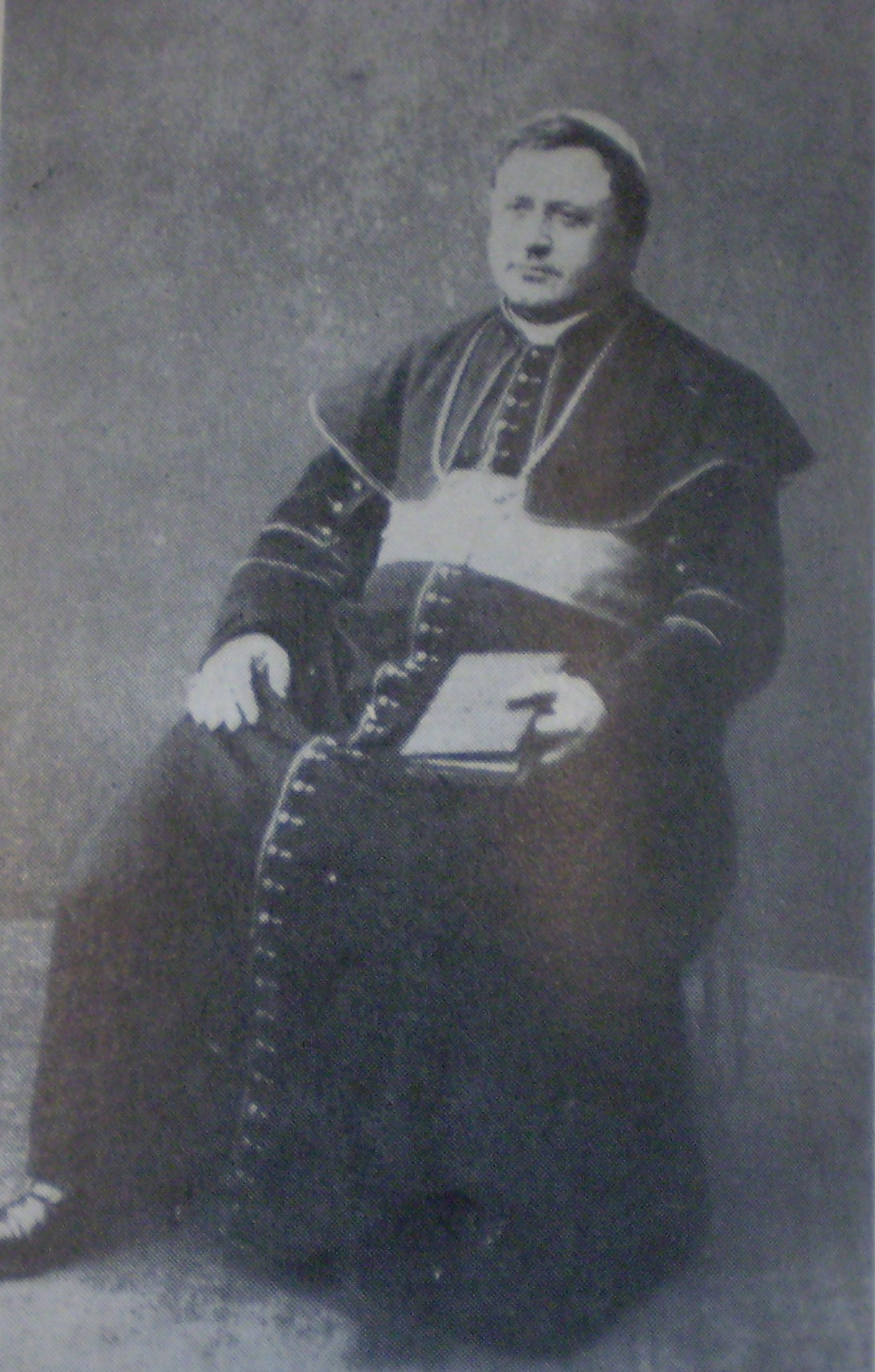
Giovanni Cagliero (1838–1926), made a cardinal on 6 December 1915.

With Europe at war, Pope Benedict created six cardinals at a consistory on 6 December 1915. Two were Italian archbishops; the others, three Italians and an Austrian, had served in the diplomatic corps of the Holy See. Four of the six received their cardinals' galeri and their titular church assignments on 9 December, while Frühwirth and Leguigno remained at the nunciatures in Munich and Vienna. The membership of the College of Cardinals after this consistory included 29 Italians and 32 non-Italians.

Name	Title when named cardinal	Country
Giulio Tonti (1844–1918)	Apostolic Nuncio Emeritus to Portugal	Italy
Alfonso Mistrangelo (1852–1930)	Archbishop of Florence	Italy
Giovanni Cagliero (1838–1926)	Apostolic Delegate to Costa Rica, Nicaragua and Honduras	Italy
Andreas Franz Frühwirth (1845–1933)	Apostolic Nuncio to Bavaria	Austria-Hungary
Raffaele Scapinelli di Leguigno (1858–1933)	Apostolic Nuncio to Austria-Hungary	Italy
Giorgio Gusmini (1855–1921)	Archbishop of Bologna	Italy

== 4 December 1916 ==
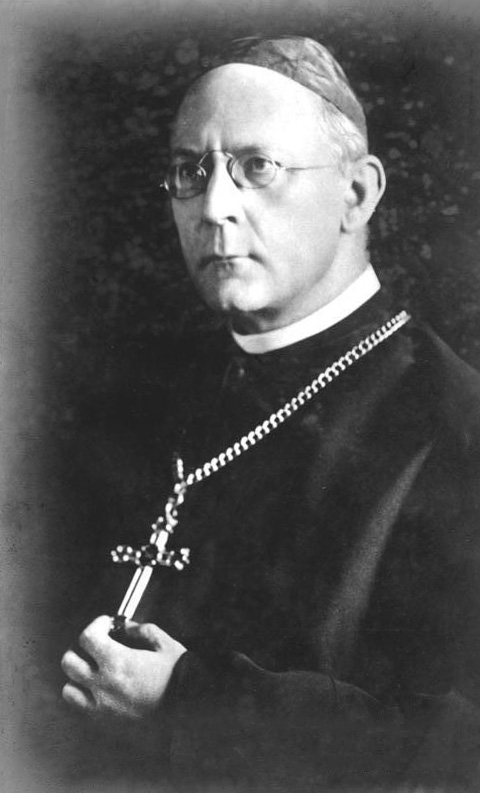
Adolf Bertram (1859–1945), made a cardinal in pectore on 4 December 1916.

Benedict held a consistory to create cardinals on 4 December 1916. No cardinals from Germany or Austria-Hungary attended. The ten new cardinals were all natives of and working in France and Italy, part of the opposing wartime alliance. He also said he was appointing two more in pectore. All ten, joined by the papal diplomat Andreas Frühwirth, a native of Austria who was made a cardinal a year earlier, attended the public consistory on 7 December where they received their red galeri and were assigned their titular churches. (Note: The New York Times reported that Früwirth had received his red hat from Benedict the preceding Thursday, 27 November, because he "could not participate in the one held today", 4 December.) One cardinal created but unnamed was Adolph Bertram, whose German homeland was fighting against Italy and its allies. The other Benedict never identified. (Note: The claim that the other prelate named a cardinal in pectore was Pavel Huyn, the archbishop of Prague, also recognizes that Benedict's failure to publish the name rendered the appointment ineffective. Huyn was the object of speculation, but by the next consistory for the creation of cardinals he had resigned as archbishop.)

Name	Title when named cardinal	Country
Pietro La Fontaine (1860–1935)	Patriarch of Venice	Italy
Vittorio Ranuzzi de' Bianchi (1857–1927)	Prefect of the Prefecture of the Holy Apostolic Palaces	Italy
Donato Sbarretti (1856–1939)	Secretary of the Sacred Congregation of Religious	Italy
Auguste-René-Marie Dubourg (1842–1921)	Archbishop of Rennes	(French Third Republic) France
Louis-Ernest Dubois (1856–1929)	Archbishop of Rouen	(French Third Republic) France
Tommaso Pio Boggiani (1863–1942)	Secretary of the Sacred College of Cardinals	Italy
Alessio Ascalesi (1872–1952)	Archbishop of Benevento	Italy
Louis-Joseph Maurin (1859–1936)	Bishop of Grenoble	(French Third Republic) France
Niccolò Marini (1843–1923)	Secretary of the Supreme Tribunal of the Apostolic Signatura	Italy
Oreste Giorgi (1856–1924)	Secretary of the Sacred Congregation of the Council	Italy

=== Cardinal in pectore ===
Name	Title when named cardinal	Country	Revealed as Cardinal
Adolf Bertram (1859–1945)	Bishop of Breslau	Germany	15 December 1919

== 15 December 1919 ==
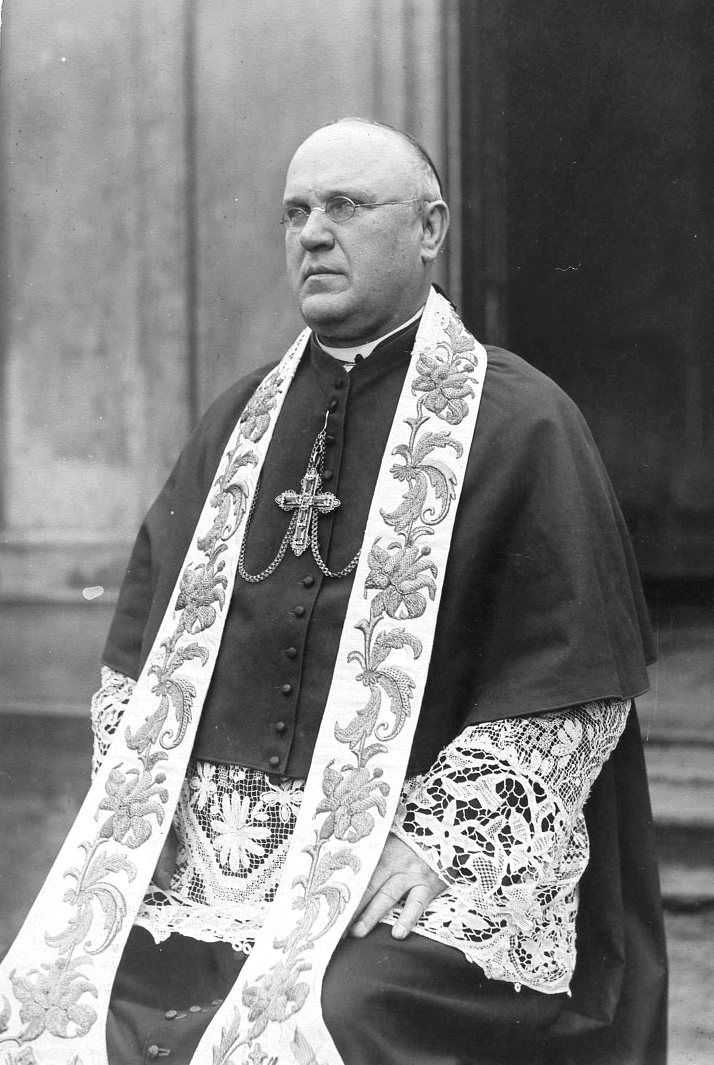
Aleksander Kakowski (1862–1938), made a cardinal on 15 December 1919.

Benedict created six cardinals on 15 December 1919, three Italians, two Poles, and one Spaniard. All attended the public consistory three days later to receive their cardinals' galeri and be assigned their titular church or deaconry, except for Juan Soldevila y Romero, Archbishop of Zaragoza. (Note: Soldevila y Romero received his galero and titular church assignment on 22 April 1920.) Adolf Bertram, created a cardinal in pectore in 1916, participated in this consistory as well. At the close of this consistory, the College of Cardinals had 63 members, 32 Italians and 31 non-Italians.

Name	Title when named cardinal	Country
Filippo Camassei (1848–1921)	Patriarch of Jerusalem	Ottoman Empire
Augusto Silj (1846–1926)	Vice-Camerlengo of the Reverend Apostolic Camera	Italy
Juan Soldevila y Romero (1843–1923)	Archbishop of Zaragoza	Spain
Teodoro Valfre di Bonzo (1853–1922)	Apostolic Nuncio to Austria	Italy
Aleksander Kakowski (1862–1938)	Archbishop of Warsaw	Poland
Edmund Dalbor (1869–1926)	Archbishop of Poznan and Gniezno	Poland

== 7 March 1921 ==
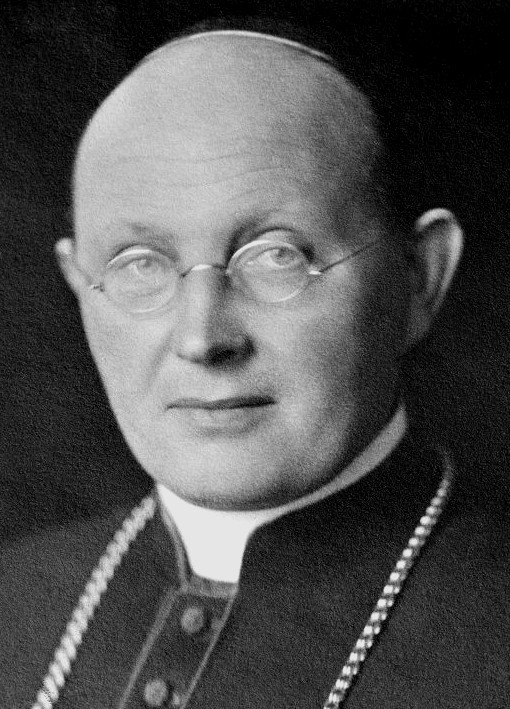
Karl Joseph Schulte (1871–1941), made a cardinal on 7 March 1921.

Benedict added six prelates to the College as cardinal priests on 7 March 1921, two Germans, 2 Spaniards, an American, and an Italian. Three of them–Faulhaber, Dougherty, and Schulte–received their red galeri and titular church assignments on 10 March. The six names had been announced on 22 February.

Name	Title when named cardinal	Country
Francesco Ragonesi (1850–1931)	Apostolic Nuncio to Spain	Italy
Michael von Faulhaber (1869–1952)	Archbishop of Munich and Freising	Germany
Dennis Joseph Dougherty (1865–1951)	Archbishop of Philadelphia	United States
Juan Benlloch i Vivó (1864–1926)	Archbishop of Burgos	Spain
Francisco Vidal y Barraquer (1868–1943)	Archbishop of Tarragona	Spain
Karl Joseph Schulte (1871–1941)	Archbishop of Cologne	Germany

== 13 June 1921 ==
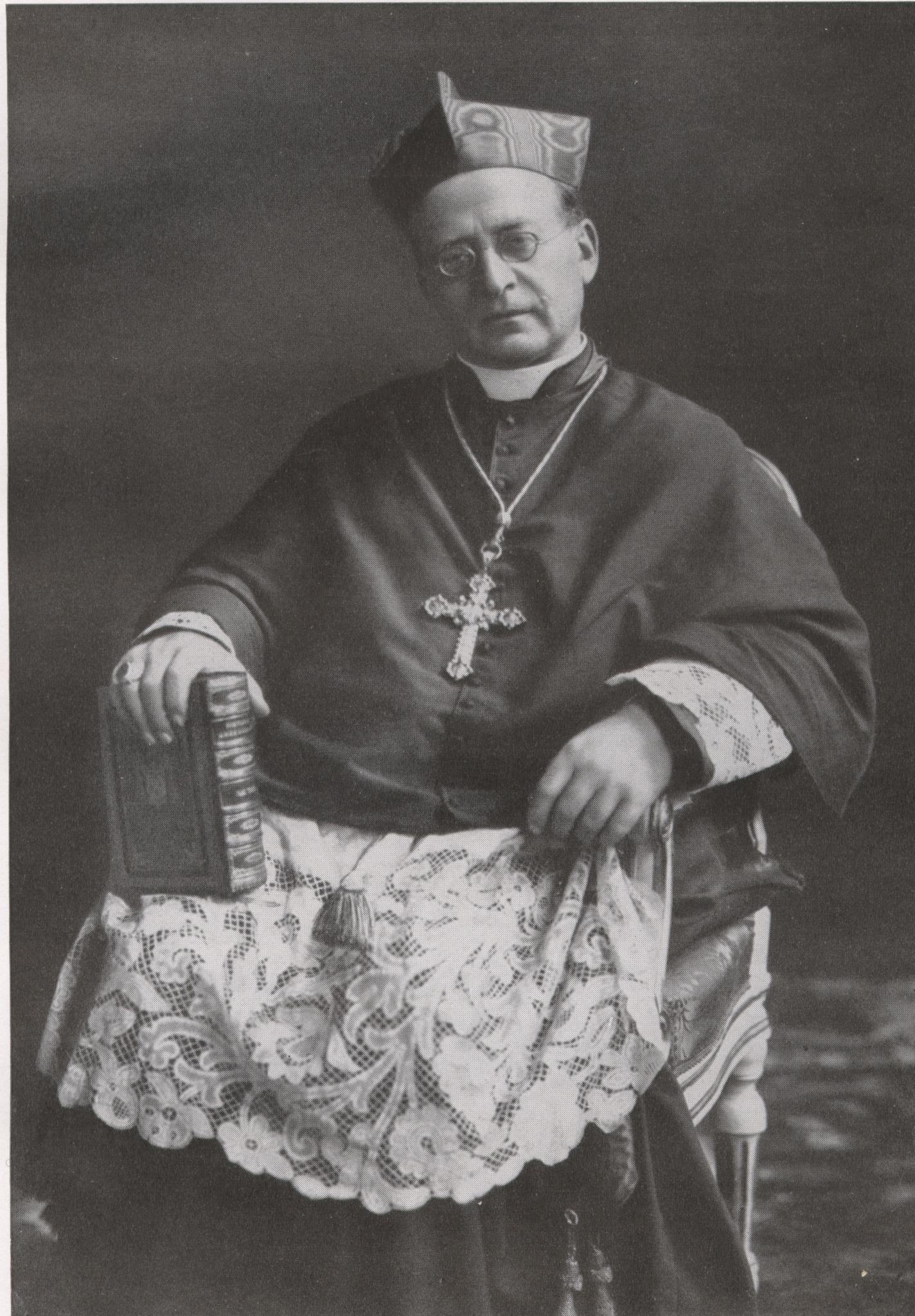
Achille Ratti (1857–1939), made a cardinal on 13 June 1921 and elected as Pope Pius XI in 6 February 1922.

Benedict named three Italian cardinals at his last consistory, including Achille Ratti, who succeeded him as Pope Pius XI in February 1922. Three others made cardinals the previous March participated, having been first awarded their red hats by the King of Spain: Francesco Ragonesi, Papal Nuncio to Spain, and the Spanish bishops Juan Benlloch i Vivó and Francisco Vidal y Barraquer. On 16 June, Benedict gave them all their red galeri and the five cardinal priests received their titular church assignments and the one cardinal deacon, Laurenti, his deaconry. Italian newspapers reported that Benedict privately told the three new cardinals that "We gave you the red robe of a Cardinal.... very soon, however, one of you will wear the white robe".

Name	Title when named cardinal	Country
Giovanni Tacci Porcelli (1863–1928)	Prefect of the Prefecture of the Holy Apostolic Palaces	Italy
Achille Ratti (1857–1939) (Note: Elected as Pope Pius XI (1922–1939))	Apostolic Nuncio to Poland	Italy
Camillo Laurenti (1861–1938)	Secretary of the Sacred Congregation of the Propagation of the Faith	Italy
