= Vittorio Ranuzzi de' Bianchi =

His Eminence Vittorio Amadeo Ranuzzi de' Bianchi
- Cardinal-Priest of Santa Prisca
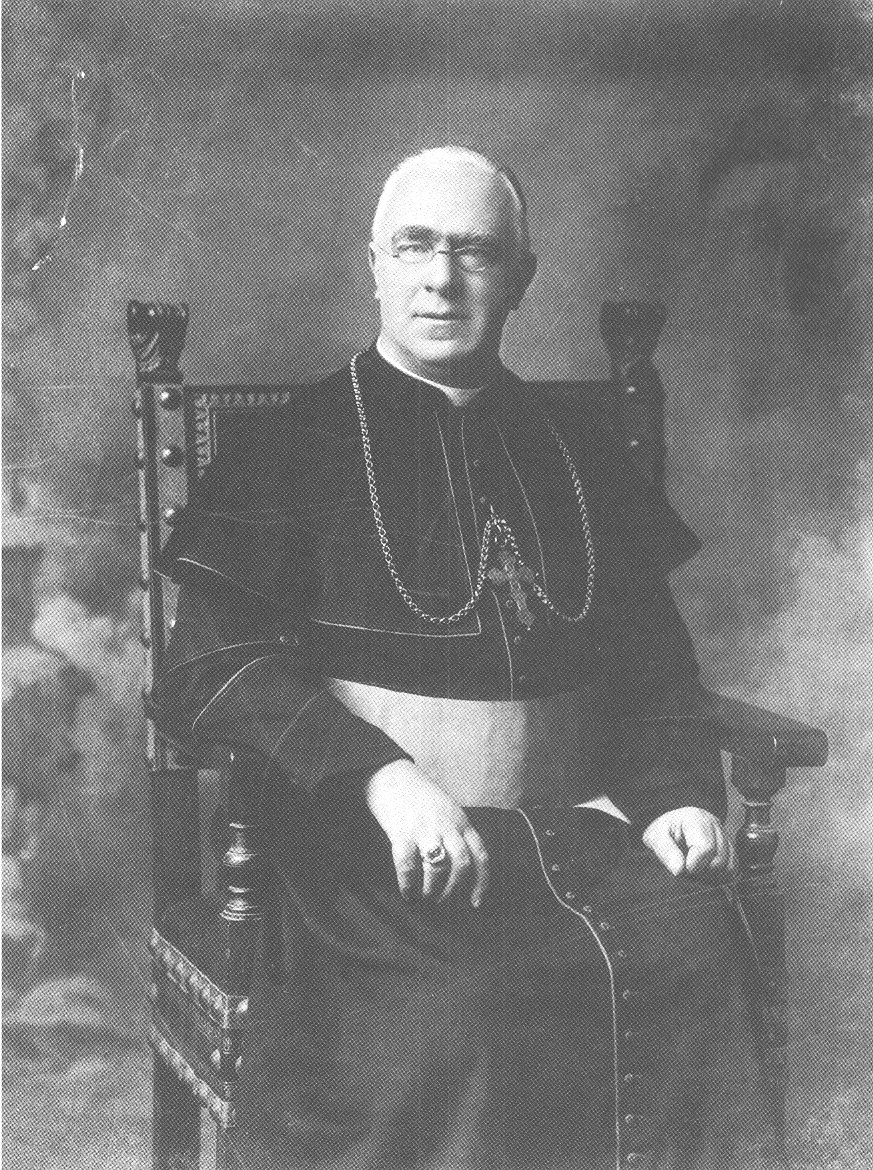
- Church: Roman Catholic Church
- Appointed: 7 December 1916
- Term ended: 16 February 1927
- Predecessor: Domenico Ferrata
- Successor: Charles-Henri-Joseph Binet
- Previous posts: Bishop of Loreto (1903-11); Bishop of Recanati (1903-11); Titular Archbishop of Tyrus (1911-16)

Orders
- Ordination: 14 May 1880 by Lucido Maria Parocchi
- Consecration: 12 July 1903 by Pietro Respighi
- Created cardinal: 4 December 1916 by Pope Benedict XV
- Rank: Cardinal-Priest

Personal details
- Born: Vittorio Amadeo Ranuzzi de' Bianchi; 14 July 1857 Bologna, Papal States
- Died: 16 February 1927 (aged 69) Rome, Kingdom of Italy
- Parents: Gian Carlo Ranuzzi; Cesarina de' Bianchi dei Conti di Piano

Styles of Vittorio Ranuzzi de' Bianchi
- Reference style: His Eminence
- Spoken style: Your Eminence
- Informal style: Cardinal
- See: none

Vittorio Amedeo Ranuzzi de' Bianchi (14 July 1857 – 16 February 1927) was an Italian Cardinal of the Roman Catholic Church. He served as papal majordomo from 1914 until his death, and was elevated to the cardinalate in 1916.

== Biography ==
Vittorio Ranuzzi de' Bianchi was born in Bologna to a family of nobility. He received the Sacrament of Confirmation in 1865, and studied at the Seminary of Bologna and the Theological College of Bologna, from where he received his doctorate in theology in July 1882. In April 1886, he earned his doctorate in canon and civil law.

Ranuzzi was ordained to the priesthood on 14 May 1880, and then did pastoral work in the archdiocese of Bologna and taught at its seminary, where he also served as spiritual director from 1894 to 1899. He was later made an honorary canon (1885) and primicerius (1892) of the cathedral chapter, counselor of the nunciature to France on 13 September 1899, and a Domestic Prelate of His Holiness in 1899.

On 22 June 1903, Ranuzzi was appointed Bishop of Recanati-Loreto by Pope Leo XIII. He received his episcopal consecration on the following 12 July from Cardinal Pietro Respighi, with Archbishops Giuseppe Constantini and Rafael Merry del Val serving as co-consecrators, at the chapel of the Nobili Oblate in Tor de' Specchi in Rome. After being promoted to Titular Archbishop of Tyrus on 27 November 1911, Ranuzzi was later named Master of the Papal Chamber on 30 November of that same year, and papal majordomo on 7 September 1914.

Pope Benedict XV created him Cardinal-Priest of Santa Prisca in the consistory of 4 December 1916. Ranuzzi was one of the cardinal electors who participated in the 1922 papal conclave, which selected Pope Pius XI.

Ranuzzi died in Rome, at the age of 69. He is buried in his family's tomb at the Carthusian cemetery in Bologna.

Catholic Church titles
Preceded by Guglielmo Giustini	Bishop of Recanati-Loreto; 1903–1911	Succeeded by Alfonso Andreoli
Preceded by Gaetano Bisleti	Papal majordomo 1914–1927	Succeeded by Ricardo Sanz de Samper y Campuzano
