= Giovanni Tacci Porcelli =

Italian prelate (1863–1928)

His Eminence Giovanni Tacci Porcelli
- Cardinal-Priest of Santa Maria in Trastevere
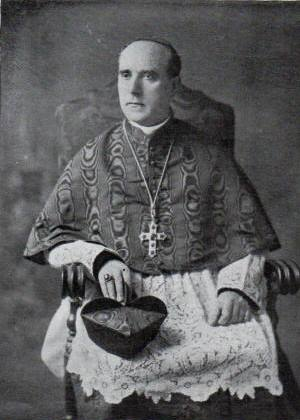
- Appointed: 13 June 1921
- Term ended: 30 June 1928
- Predecessor: James Gibbons
- Successor: Pedro Segura y Sáenz
- Previous posts: Bishop of Città della Pieve (1895–1904); Titular Archbishop of Nicaea (1905–1921); Nuncio to Belgium (1907–1911); Internuncio to the Netherlands (1911–1918); Prefect of the Pontifical Household (1918–1921); Secretary of the Congregation for the Oriental Churches (1922–1927)

Orders
- Ordination: 18 September 1886
- Consecration: 5 May 1895 by Amilcare Malagola
- Created cardinal: 13 June 1921 by Pope Benedict XV
- Rank: Cardinal-priest

Personal details
- Born: Giovanni Tacci Porcelli; 12 November 1863 Mogliano, Marche, Papal States
- Died: 30 June 1928 (aged 64) Rome, Kingdom of Italy
- Buried: Campo Verano cemetery
- Denomination: Catholic (Roman Rite)
- Parents: Luigi Tacci & Maria Monti Guarnieri

Styles of Giovanni Tacci Porcelli
- Reference style: His Eminence
- Spoken style: Your Eminence
- Informal style: Cardinal
- See: Nicaea (titular)

Giovanni Tacci Porcelli known as Giovanni Tacci (Note: He dropped "Porcelli", "pigs" in Italian, from his name at the suggestion of Pope Benedict XV and appears several times in Acta Apostolicae Sedis between 1916 and 1927 as Giovanni Tacci. In 1914 he signed two letters to Cardinal Rafael Merry del Val as Giovanni Tacci. The New York Times nevertheless called him Giovanni Tacci Porcelli when reporting he was made a cardinal in 1921.) (12 November 1863 – 30 June 1928) was an Italian prelate of the Catholic Church who was Bishop of Città della Pieve for twenty years, then a papal ambassador, and finally secretary of the Congregation for the Oriental Churches from 1922 to 1927. He was made a cardinal in 1921.

== Biography ==
Giovanni Tacci Porcelli was born in Mogliano to Professor Luigi Tacci and Maria Monti Guarnieri. He studied at the seminary in Tolentino and earned doctorates in theology and canon law at the Pontifical Roman Seminary. To prepare for a career in the diplomatic service he attended the Pontifical Ecclesiastical Academy. He was ordained a priest on 19 September 1886. He then did pastoral work in Fermo and Rome until 1895 and was raised to the rank of domestic chamberlain of his holiness. He also served as dean of the Pontifical Ecclesiastical Academy, a member of the Commission of Pontifical Schools, and an ecclesiasticus of several monasteries.

On 18 March 1895, he was appointed Bishop of Città della Pieve by Pope Leo XIII. He received his episcopal consecration on 5 May from Cardinal Amilcare Malagola.

He was named apostolic delegate to Constantinople and patriarchal vicar for Latin-rite Catholics there on 19 December 1904, after being named Titular Archbishop of Nicaea. He was appointed nuncio to Belgium on 31 December 1907 and then internuncio to the Netherlands on 18 March 1911.

He was appointed majordomo of his holiness on 8 December 1916 and his diplomatic career ended when he was appointed prefect of the Pontifical Household on 30 October 1918.

Pope Benedict XV made him Cardinal-Priest of Santa Maria in Trastevere in the consistory of 13 June 1921. He was one of the cardinal electors who participated in the 1922 papal conclave, which elected Pope Pius XI; erroneous news from Rome reported that Tacci himself had been elected.

Pope Pius named him secretary of the Congregation for the Oriental Churches on 8 August 1922, in effect its head since until 1967 the pope reserved the title of prefect of that congregation to himself. On 17 September, he was made a member of the Congregation for the Doctrine of the Faith and on 24 November of the Pontifical Commission for the Interpretation of the Code of Canon Law. He resigned his post as secretary on 29 January 1927 for health reasons.

He died in Rome on 30 June 1928, at the age of 64 and was buried in the Campo Verano cemetery.

== See also ==
- Cardinals created by Benedict XV

== Notes ==
Catholic Church titles
Preceded by Paolo Gregori	Bishop of Città della Pieve; 18 March 1895 – 19 December 1904	Succeeded by Giuseppe Angelucci
Preceded by Antonio Vico	Nuncio to Belgium; 31 December 1907 – 18 March 1911	Succeeded by Achille Locatelli
Preceded by unknown	Internuncio to the Netherlands; 18 March 1911 – 30 October 1918	Succeeded by Cesare Orsenigo
Preceded by Pietro Gasparri	Prefect of the Pontifical Household; 30 October 1918 – 13 June 1921	Succeeded by Camillo Caccia-Dominioni
Preceded by Niccolò Marini	Secretary of the Congregation for the Oriental Churches; 8 August 1922 – 29 January 1927	Succeeded by Luigi Sincero
