= Niccolò Marini =

His Eminence Niccolò Marini
- Cardinal-Deacon of Santa Maria in Domnica
- Church: Roman Catholic Church
- Appointed: 7 December 1916
- Term ended: 27 July 1923
- Predecessor: Scipione Tecchi
- Successor: Camillo Caccia Dominioni
- Previous post: Secretary of the Congregation for the Oriental Churches (1917–22)

Orders
- Ordination: 26 June 1866
- Created cardinal: 4 December 1916 by Pope Benedict XV
- Rank: Cardinal-Deacon

Personal details
- Born: Niccolò Marini; 20 August 1843 Rome, Papal States
- Died: 27 July 1923 (aged 79) Palazzo Brancaccio, Rome, Kingdom of Italy
- Buried: Campo Verano
- Parents: Emanuele Marini; Adelaide Fabbroni
- Education: Collegio Capranica; Collegio Romano; La Sapienza University
- Coat of arms: Niccolò Marini's coat of arms

Styles of Niccolò Marini
- Reference style: His Eminence
- Spoken style: Your Eminence
- Informal style: Cardinal
- See: none

Niccolò Marini (20 August 1843 – 27 July 1923) was an Italian Cardinal of the Catholic Church who served as secretary of the Congregation for the Oriental Churches from 1917 to 1922, and was elevated to the cardinalate in 1916.

== Biography ==
Marini was born in Rome, and was a relative of Pietro Cardinal Marini. He studied at the Collegio Capranica; the Pontifical Gregorian University, from where he obtained his doctorates in philosophy, in theology, and in canon and civil law; and the Royal University of Rome. He was ordained to the priesthood on 26 June 1866, and then did pastoral work in Rome.

Founder of the Catholic daily Il buon senso, he also worked with Catholic Action in creating the women's club Gaetana Agnesi. He was later named vicar general of Cardinal Luigi Oreglia di Santo Stefano. He became an official of the Sacred Consistorial Congregation in 1878, and a Privy Chamberlain de numero participante on 20 July 1881. On 27 March 1882, he acted as ablegatus in delivering the red galero to the newly created cardinal Joaquín Lluch y Garriga. After being appointed a canon of the chapter of the Lateran Basilica, Marini was an attaché in the nunciature to Spain from 1882 to 1889. He was then named a canon of St. Peter's Basilica on 11 July 1889, Substitute (or deputy) of the Secretariat of Briefs on 18 March 1892, and both Domestic Prelate of His Holiness and Protonotary apostolic ad instar participantium two days later.

Marini was highly active in pursuing greater unity between the Eastern Christianity and the Western Church. It was this pursuit that took him on travels to the Holy Land, Egypt, Greece, and North Africa. Within the Roman Curia, he was made a consultor to the Sacred Congregation of Studies (10 October 1902), Pontifical Biblical Commission (1911), Commission for the Codification of Canon Law (9 March 1912), and to the liturgical section of the Sacred Congregation of Rites (26 March 1914). He was appointed Secretary of the Supreme Tribunal of the Apostolic Signature on 20 October 1908. As Secretary, Marini served as the second-highest official of the dicastery, under Cardinal Vincenzo Vannutelli. He was highly decorated as well, having been made Commander of the Order of Isabella the Catholic (Spain), of the Order of the Crown of Prussia, and of the Order of the Holy Sepulchre, and an Officer of the Légion d'honneur.

Pope Benedict XV created him Cardinal-Deacon of Santa Maria in Domnica in the consistory of 4 December 1916. Marini, who never became a bishop, was named to the Commission of Historical Studies on 4 January 1917. He was made Secretary of the Sacred Congregation for the Oriental Churches on 29 November 1917, essentially serving as head of that congregation as the Pope was the nominal Prefect at that time. Cardinal Marini resigned his post because of his advanced age and poor health in 1922. During that same year, he participated in the papal conclave that selected Pope Pius XI, although he was suffering from acute influenza; The Times of London erroneously reported Marini's death.

Marini recovered from his illness. One of his last appointments was as Protector and Visitor of all the Oriental Institutes of Rome on 28 July 1922.

Cardinal Marini died in Rome. He is buried in the Campo Verano cemetery.

== Bibliography ==
- Bessarione. (E. Loescher e c.[etc.], 1896)
- Il primato di s. Pietro : o de' suoi successori in San Giovanni Crisostomo (Istituto Pio IX, 1919)
- Le Prooemium de Diodore de Sicile (V. Palmé, 1891)
- Pietro Card. Marini, 1794-1863; reminiscenze (V. Salviucci, 1902)

Catholic Church titles
Preceded by unknown	Secretary of the Congregation for Oriental Churches; 1917–1922	Succeeded by Giovanni Tacci Porcelli
