= Cum proxime =

Rule concerning the election of a new pope

Pope Pius XI instituted a new rule for setting the date for the start of a papal conclave to elect a new pope by promulgating the document Cum proxime on 1 March 1922, less than a month after his own election. The four non-European cardinals had not participated in the conclave that elected him in February. Three of them arrived too late and one did not attempt the journey. With Cum proxime, Pius XI extended the time between the death of a pope and the start of the conclave to increase the likelihood that cardinals from distant locations could reach Rome in time to participate.

Like other documents issued on the pope's own authority, that is, a motu proprio, it is known by the opening words of its original Latin text. Pius begins by saying that he has been considering the conclave that elected him, and his opening words "Cum proxime" mean roughly since the recent.

== Background ==
Traveling to attend at a conclave had long posed a challenge to cardinals outside of Italy. On occasion the cardinals based in or near Rome entered a conclave hoping to elect a pope before all their colleagues joined them. Wartime constraints allowed only 34 of 45 cardinals to attend the conclave of 1799-1800 in Venice. Despite dramatic improvements in transportation in the 19th century, the appointment of cardinals outside Europe presented a new challenge. In 1878 Cardinal John McCloskey arrived from New York five days after the start of the conclave, three days after it concluded. (Note: McCloskey sailed from New York on 9 February and reached Rome on 23 February.) In 1903 Cardinal James Gibbons of Baltimore was able to attend only because the death of Pope Leo XIII was long anticipated. (Note: He left from New York on 9 July and arrived so early that he remained in France waiting for Leo to die.) That same year Cardinal Patrick Francis Moran of Sydney left Australia on 9 July and was not expected to reach Rome until August 20. In 1914, when the conclave began on 31 August, Cardinals Gibbons of Baltimore and William O'Connell of Boston were not expected to arrive in Rome before 1 November and Cardinal Louis-Nazaire Bégin of Quebec even later. In 1922, Cardinal Joaquim Arcoverde de Albuquerque Cavalcanti of Rio de Janeiro knew he could not reach Rome in time for the conclave and did not attempt the journey. The other three non-European cardinals–again O'Connell and Bégin as in 1914, as well as Denis Dougherty of Philadelphia–did not arrive in time to participate in the conclave. O'Connell arrived at the Vatican on 6 February "at the moment the new Pope was blessing the multitude". (Note: One observer, unidentified by the historian who provides his view, thought O'Connell "intentionally selected slow transport" to underscore both the need for more time and the importance of the US to the church.) Cardinals Dougherty and Bégin never expected to arrive in time, learned the outcome of the conclave while still at sea, and reached Rome on 9 February.

In 1922, the College of Cardinals debated whether to start the conclave as required after allowing ten days to elapse after the death of Benedict XV. Two-thirds of the non-Italian cardinals and some of the Italians wanted to delay the start until at least one of the Americans arrived. Cardinal János Csernoch of Hungary told the other cardinals that "America is a vital part of the Church. It will be calamitous to deny her participation in the election of the Pontiff. It will have a grave reaction among the American people; it will wound their pride and dignity." Cardinal Friedrich Gustav Piffl opposed proceeding without the Americans "for the sake of a technicality". (Note: The 53 cardinals who entered the conclave on 2 February, the eleventh day following the death of Benedict XV as required, were 31 Italians, five French, four Spanish, three German, 3 British, 2 Polish, 2 Austrian, one Hungarian, one Belgian and one Dutch.)

== Cum proxime ==
Immediately following the conclave, the dispute about delaying the conclave to await the arrival of the Americans continued. On 8 February, four French cardinals, Louis Luçon of Rheims, Louis-Ernest Dubois of Paris, Pierre Andrieu of Bordeaux, and Louis-Joseph Maurin of Lyon, asked for changes to church law to allow for an indefinite delay to ensure participation by cardinals from North and South America. And Cardinal Pietro Gasparri, who had led the Italians in opposition to a delay, expressed support for some modification of the schedule.

On 28 February Pope Pius met with Cardinal O'Connell and said: "There will be no more racing 5,000 miles in a vain endeavor to reach Rome in time for a Conclave. The United States is too important to be ignored as she has been. I shall see to it that what happened at the last Conclave shall not occur again."

Pius XI issued new regulations in Cum proxime on 1 March 1922. He noted the experience of the conclave that elected him and that cardinals had requested modifications. In place of a fixed interval of ten days following the day the papacy becomes vacant, he set the start of the conclave at ten to fifteen days from the death of the pope and allowed the College of Cardinals, meeting in general congregation, to extend that to as long as eighteen days.

== Later experience ==
When the next papal conclave took place in 1939, the College of Cardinals waited the maximum eighteen days and all 62 cardinals attended, including six from the Western Hemisphere. By the next conclave in 1958, the speed of travel matched the internationalization of the College. As one newspaper put it, "the Archbishop of New York can reach Rome today faster than the Archbishop of Palermo did a generation ago". Nevertheless, in 1975 Pope Paul VI allowed the College to extend the interval to as long as twenty days.

== See also ==
- Papal conclave, 1922
- Papal conclave, 1939
