= Almo Collegio Capranica =

Roman College

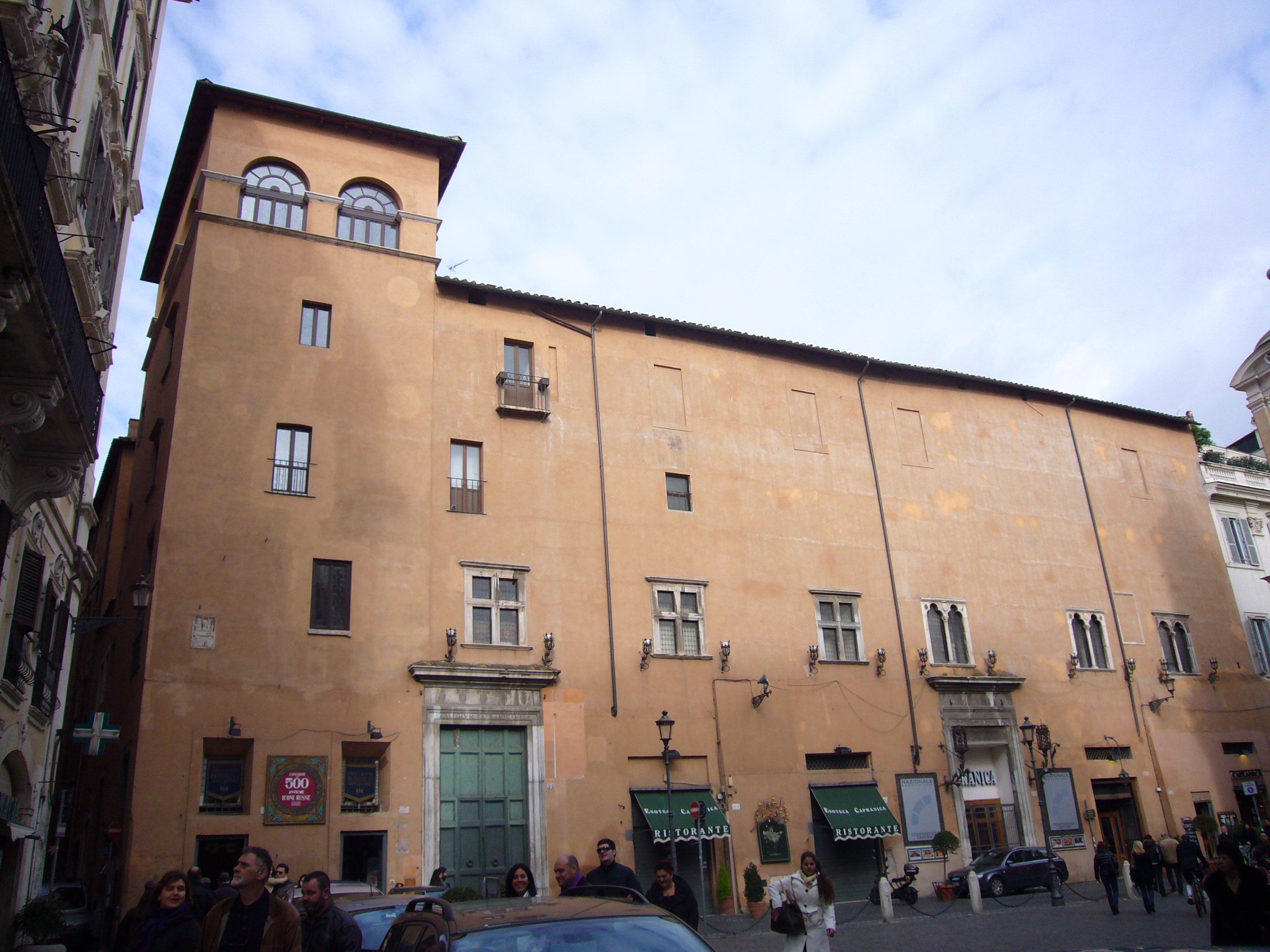

Coat of arms of Cardinal Domenico Capranica, now the coat of arms of the Almo Collegio Capranica

The Almo Collegio Capranica is the oldest Roman college, founded in 1457 by Cardinal Domenico Capranica (1400–1458) in his own palace for thirty young clerics, who received an education suitable to prepare them for the priesthood.

== History ==
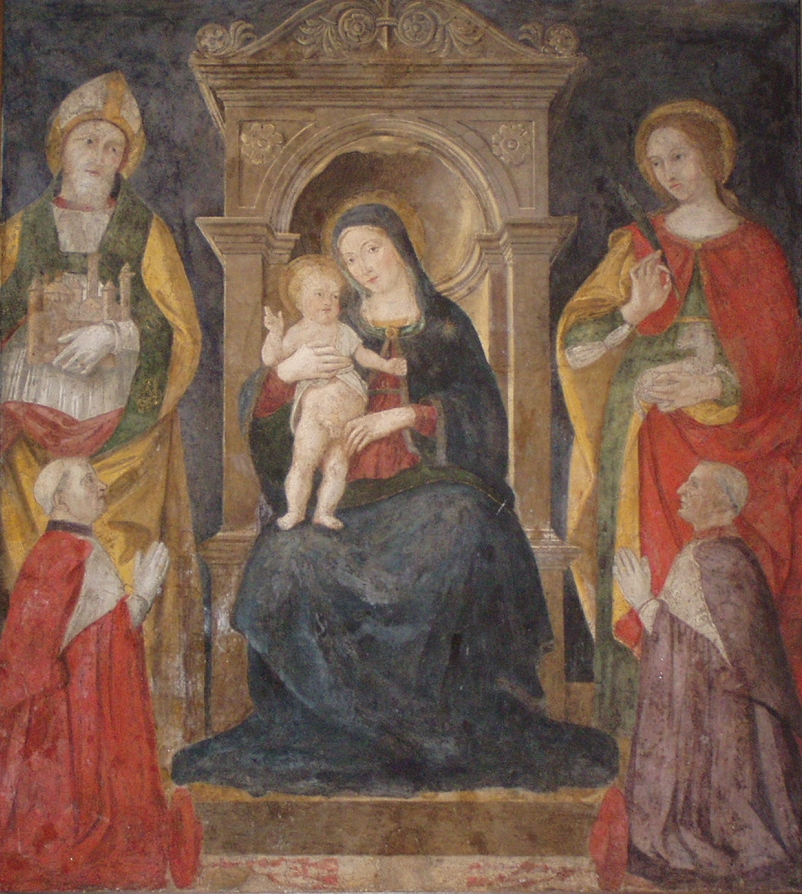
Madonna with child and saints by Antoniazzo Romano, Chapel, Almo Collegio Capranica

The Capranica College is located in the Piazza Capranica, in the Colonna district. The Capranica family made their fortunes under Pope Martin V (Oddone Colonna). Domenico Capranica (1400-1458), was a cardinal and a humanist. Upon the death of Martin V, conflict arose between the rival Colonna and Orsini families. Capranica, who was often away on assignments for the papacy, found his home stripped and decided to build a new one.

Around 1449 Cardinal Domenico Capranica began construction of his palace by buying some houses near the parish church of St. Mary in Aquiro, in the square that now bears his name. Among the buildings acquired there was a chapel, which tradition says was built on the site of the birthplace of St. Agnes, who would have suffered martyrdom in the nearby stadium of Domitian.

He founded the college in January 1457, with the aim of offering the opportunity of a proper education for the priesthood to young poor of the city of Rome. He opened it in his own palace for thirty-one poor scholars, sixteen in theology and the liberal arts, and fifteen in canon law. In this he anticipated by more than a century the establishment of "seminaries" decreed by the Council of Trent. The institution was the first of its kind in Rome; initially reserved for young Romans, it later extended hospitality to students from other Italian regions and of different nationalities.

Capranica himself drew up their rules and presented the college with his own library, the more valuable portion of which was later transferred to the Vatican. The curriculum included the study of Aristotle and Aquinas. It was expected that over the holidays, students would gain experience by serving in the cathedral or in other local churches.

When the Constable de Bourbon laid siege to Rome in 1527, the Capranica students were among the few defenders of the Porta di S. Spirito, and all of them with their rector died when Rome was breached. The word "Almo" ("who gives life") in the title remembers them. The rector, according to the university custom of those days, was elected by the students and was always one of them until Pope Alexander VII decided that the rector should be appointed by the protectors of the college. In 1971 Pope Paul VI instituted an Episcopal Commission, composed of three former students, a cardinal and two bishops to direct the seminary.

After the French Revolution, the college was re-established in 1807; the number of free students was reduced to 13, but paying students were admitted. The College was closed from 1798 to 1807, during the Roman Republic.

Currently, the college has about fifty students, primarily from dioceses in Italy. There are also Orthodox pupils and students from Eastern Catholic Churches. Some students are preparing for the priesthood, others, already priests, continue their postgraduate studies. Typically a Capranica student enters the College during the years of preparation for ordination and remains there until the completion of his specialization. The college's patroness is St. Agnes.

== Building ==
The original one-story building probably had the workshops on the ground floor, with the living quarters and state rooms on the main floor. After the death of Domenico in 1458, his brother Angelo, also a cardinal, enlarged the palace, but reserved part of the building for the family, who later created a theatre from existing family apartments without changing the exterior of the building.

The facade facing the square, is covered with light plaster and is characterized by the presence of the square tower, ending with a loggia that opens to the outside with two arched windows on each side. The current façade is not the original one but the result of renovations mainly in seventeenth century, during which as additional floor was added.

=== Chapel of St. Agnes ===
This chapel is commonly believed to be the oldest place of worship dedicated to the martyr.

The main chapel of the College, dedicated to St Agnes, was restored in 1954 in neo-Renaissance style. The walls are covered with polychrome marble and decorated with a double cornice. The semicircular apse contains afresco of Madonna with Child, a holy bishop and St Agnes, attributed to Antoniazzo Romano. Stained glass windows depict Saints Gregory the Great, Augustine, Jerome and Ambrose. The pipe organ is a Mascioni (Opus 696) manufactured in 1953.

== Alumni ==
The Capranica has produced many notable ecclesiastics, including Popes Benedict XV and Pius XII, numerous cardinals, and Blessed Luigi Novarese

Pope Benedict XV (Born Giacomo della Chiesa,1854-1922), Pope from 3 September 1914 to 22 January 1922

Pope Pius XII (Born Eugenio Pacelli, 1872-1958), Pope from 2 March 1939 to 9 October 1958

Cardinal Bartolomeo Bacilieri (1842–1923) Bishop of Verona (1900-1923)

Cardinal Mariano Rampolla del Tindaro (1843–1913)Cardinal Secretary of State (1887-1903)

Cardinal Niccolò Marini (1843-1923) Prefect of the Sacred Congregation for the Oriental Churches

Cardinal Aristide Rinaldini (1844-1920) Camerlengo of the Sacred College of Cardinals

Cardinal Camillo Laurenti (1861-1938) Prefect of Sacred Congregation of Religious of the Sacred Congregation of Rites

Cardinal Francesco Marchetti Selvaggiani (1871-1951), Secretary of Propaganda Fidei and of the Holy Office, and Vicar of Rome

Cardinal Nicola Canali (1874-1961) President of the Pontifical Commission for Vatican City State (1939-1961)

Cardinal Luigi Maglione (1877-1944), Cardinal Secretary of State (1939-1944)

Cardinal Enrico Dante (1884-1967) Master of Pontifical Ceremonies (1947-1967)

Cardinal Clemente Micara (1879—1965) Pro-Prefect of the Sacred Congregation of Rites (1950-1953)

Cardinal Benedetto Aloisi Masella (1879-1970) Prefect of the Sacred Congregation for the Discipline of the Sacraments (1954-1968)

Cardinal Luigi Traglia (1895-1977) Cardinal Vicar of Rome (1965-1968)

Cardinal Guido Del Mestri (1911-1993) Nuncio Apostolico to West Germany (1975-1984)

Cardinal Domenico Bartolucci (1917- ) Director of the Sistine Chapel Choir (1956- )

Cardinal Lorenzo Antonetti (1922- ) President of Administration of the Patrimony of the Apostolic See

Cardinal Andrea Cordero Lanza di Montezemolo (1925- ), Archpriest of the Basilica of Saint Paul Outside the Walls

Cardinal Mario Francesco Pompedda (1929-2006), Prefect of the Apostolic Signatura

Cardinal Aloysius Ambrozic (1930- ) Archbishop of Toronto (1990-2007)

Cardinal Sergio Sebastiani (1931- ), President of Prefecture for the Economic Affairs of the Holy See (1997-2008)

Cardinal Renato Martino (1932- ), President of the Pontifical Council for Justice and Peace (2002-2009)

Cardinal Camillo Ruini (1932- )Vicar of the Diocesis of Rome (1991–2008), President of the Italian Episcopal Conference (1991– 2007)

Cardinal Paolo Romeo (1938- ), Archbishop of Palermo (2007- )

Archbishop Antonio Buoncristiani, archbishop of Siena, Colle di Val d'Elsa and Montalcino (2001-)

Archbishop Roland Minnerath, Archbishop of Dijon (2004- )

Archbishop Renato Boccardo, Archbishop of Spoleto and Norcia (2009-)

Archbishop Rino Fisichella, President of the Pontifical Council for the Promotion of the New Evangelisation(2010-)

Archbishop Francesco Alfano, Archbishop of Sorrento-Castellammare di Stabia (2012-)

Archbishop Domenico Sorrentino, Bishop of Assisi and Norcia (2005- )

Archbishop Michele Pennisi (1946-) Archbishop of Monreale (2013-)

Archbishop Piero Pioppo, Nuncio to Cameroon and Equatorial Guinee (2010- )

Bishop Filippo Santoro (1948-), Archbishop of Taranto (2011- )

Bishop Franco Gualdrini (1923-2010) Bishop of Terni, Narni and Amelia (1983-2000)

Bishop Mansueto Bianchi, Bishop of Volterra (2000-2006) and Pistoia (2006- ).

Bishop Paolo Gillet, (1929- ) Auxiliary Bishop of Albano (1993-2005)

Bishop Giuseppe Orlandoni, (1939- ) Bishop of Senigallia (1997- )

Bishop Richard John Grecco (1946-) bishop of Charlottetown (2009-)

Mons. Mariano Crociata (1953-) bishop of Noto, secretary general of the Italian Bishops Conference (2008-)

Bishop Frederick Colli (1949-) bishop of Thunder Bay, Ontario (1999-)

Bishop Fausto Tardelli (1951 - ), Bishop of San Miniato (2004- )

Bishop Claudio Maniago (1959-), Auxiliary bishop of Florence (2003-)

Bishop Vincenzo Apicella, Bishop of Velletri-Segni (2006-)
- Card Pietro Pavan (1903–1994)
- Card Antonio Vico (1847–1929)
- Card Alessandro Sanminiatelli Zabarella (1840 — 1910)
- Arch Alfonso Carinci (1862–1963) Secretary S.C. dei Riti (1945–1960) Rector of the Capranica (1911–1930)

== See also ==
- Roman Colleges
