= Pontificio =

Pontificio may refer to:

- The Annuario Pontificio is the annual directory of the Holy See.
- The Pontificio Collegio Filippino is the college of Filipino diocesan priests studying at pontifical universities in Rome, Italy
- The Maggiordomo Pontificio was one of the three palatine prelates concerning whom particulars have been given in the article maestro di camera
