= Luigi Novarese =

Italian Roman Catholic priest (1914–1984)

Blessed Luigi Novarese
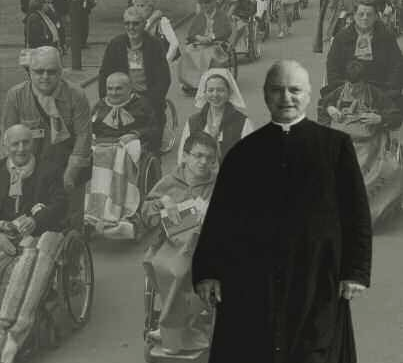
- Church: Roman Catholic Church

Orders
- Ordination: 17 December 1938 by Luigi Traglia

Personal details
- Born: Luigi Novarese; 29 July 1914 Casale Monferrato, Alessandria, Kingdom of Italy
- Died: 20 July 1984 (aged 69) Rocca Priora, Rome, Italy

Sainthood
- Feast day: 20 July
- Venerated in: Roman Catholic Church
- Beatified: 11 May 2013; Basilica di San Paolo fuori le Mura, Rome, Italy by Cardinal Tarcisio Bertone

Luigi Novarese (29 July 1914 - 20 July 1984) was an Italian Roman Catholic priest and the co-founder (alongside Sr. Elvira Myriam Psorulla) of the Apostolate of the Suffering as well as the Silent Workers of the Cross. Novarese also established the Marian Priest League and the Brothers and Sisters of the Sick; he built several homes for those who were ill and disabled. He served in the Secretariat of State until leaving that position to work alongside the Italian Episcopal Conference and to dedicate more time to the ill and to the work of his orders.

Novarese was beatified in mid-2013; Cardinal Tarcisio Bertone beatified him on the behalf of Pope Francis in the Basilica di San Paolo fuori le Mura.

== Life ==
Luigi Novarese was born in 1914 as the last of nine children to the farmers Giusto Carlo Novarese and Teresa Sassone. His father died in 1915 from pneumonia. Due to illness one leg was shorter than the other (fifteen centimetres) and so he had to wear special orthopedic shoes his entire life in order to compensate for the difference in leg height.

In 1923 he was diagnosed with bone tuberculosis and his mother exhausted all available funds for treatment despite doctors giving up all hope on him recovering; he sent a letter to Filippo Rinaldi - the third superior of the Salesians of Don Bosco - and asked that he and his students intercede for him. Rinaldi replied and said he and the students would ask for the intercession of John Bosco. He was able to leave the hospital on 17 May 1931 after having been cured of his ailment at a rapid pace.

During his numerous visits in the hospital he decided that he would become a doctor if he was able to recover though decided instead to join the priesthood after his mother died in 1935. He studied at Casale Monferrato and then at the Capranica College in Rome. Novarese was ordained to the priesthood on 17 December 1938 in the Basilica of Saint John Lateran. He received degrees in theological studies in 1939 (from the Gregorian) and in canon law on 9 April 1943. On 1 May 1942 he accepted an invitation from Monsignor Giovanni Battista Montini - the future Pope Paul VI - to join his staff in the Secretariat of State and he remained there until 12 May 1970 when he decided to leave and take up a new post elsewhere. He founded the Marian Priest League on 17 May 1943; he later co-founded the Volunteers of Suffering in 1947 and later the Silent Workers of the Cross in 1950. Novarese also founded the Brothers and Sisters of the Sick in 1952.

In 1949 he obtained permission from Pope Pius XII to launch an hour dedicated to the sick on the Vatican Radio. Pope John XXIII - in 1962 - placed him in charge of the chaplains of all Italian hospitals. In 1970 he left the Secretariat of State and was put in charge of the health sector of the Italian Episcopal Conference where he remained until 1977. He met Pope John Paul II on one occasion and the two embraced.

Novarese died in 1984; his remains were interred in the Santa Maria del Suffragio in Via Giulia in Rome.

== Beatification ==
The beatification process launched in Frascati in a diocesan process that was inaugurated on 17 December 1998 and later concluded on 13 December 2003 - the Congregation for the Causes of Saints later validated this process in Rome on 26 November 2004. The official start to the cause came under John Paul II on 1 July 1994 and he became titled as a Servant of God. The C.C.S. later received the Positio in 2008 and the theologians approved it on 19 December 2008 as did the C.C.S. members on 5 February 2010. Pope Benedict XVI confirmed that Novarese led a life of heroic virtue on 27 March 2010 and titled the late priest as Venerable.

The process for a miracle spanned from 22 June 2007 and concluded its work on 8 January 2008; the C.C.S. validated this on 13 June 2008. Medical experts approved this miracle on 14 October 2010 as did theologians on 7 June 2011 and the C.C.S. on 15 November 2011. Benedict XVI approved the miracle on 19 December 2011 and Cardinal Tarcisio Bertone presided over the formal beatification in the Basilica di San Paolo fuori le Mura on 11 May 2013 on the behalf of Pope Francis. The miracle in question was the 2002 healing of Graziella Paderno.

The current postulator for this cause is the Dominican priest Vito Tomás Gómez García.
