= Victor-Lucien-Sulpice Lécot =

French archbishop and cardinal

His Eminence Victor-Lucien-Sulpice Lécot
- Cardinal, Archbishop of Bordeaux
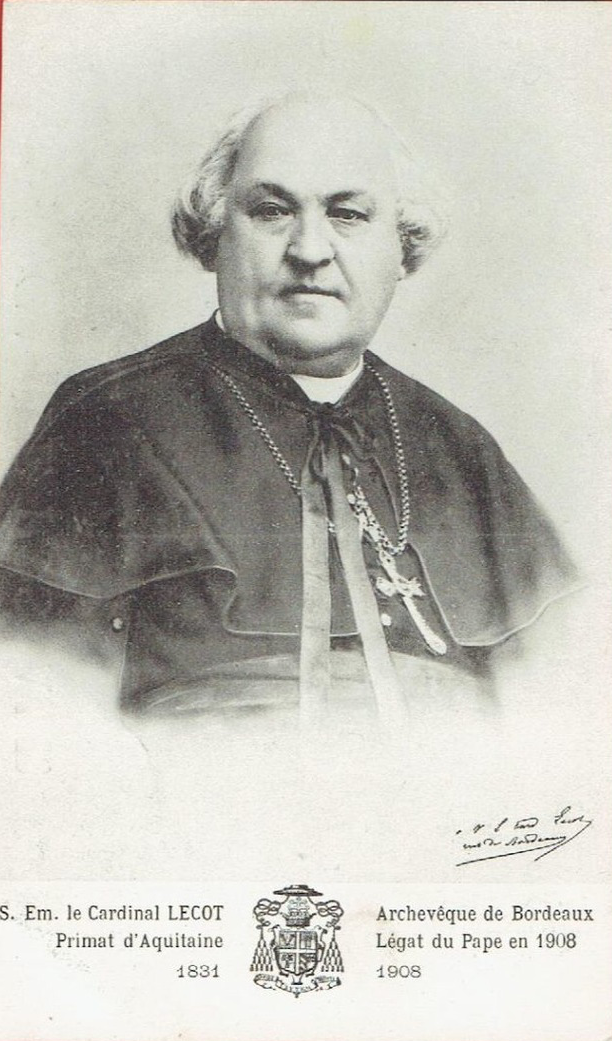
- Church: Catholic Church
- Archdiocese: Bordeaux
- See: Bordeaux
- Appointed: 26 June 1890
- Installed: 1 September 1890
- Term ended: 19 December 1908
- Predecessor: Aimé-Victor-François Guilbert
- Successor: Pierre-Paulin Andrieu
- Other post: Cardinal-Priest of Santa Pudenziana (1894-1908)
- Previous post: Bishop of Dijon (1886-90)

Orders
- Ordination: 24 June 1855
- Consecration: 11 July 1886 by Joseph-Maxence Péronne
- Created cardinal: 12 June 1893 by Leo XIII
- Rank: Cardinal-Priest

Personal details
- Born: Victor-Lucien-Sulpice Lécot; 8 January 1831 Montescourt-Lizerolles, French Kingdom
- Died: 19 December 1908 (aged 77) Chambéry, French Third Republic
- Buried: Bordeaux Cathedral
- Parents: Pierre Henri Lécot; Celestine Alexandrine Pourrier
- Motto: Nos autem Christi
- Coat of arms

Styles of Victor Lecot
- Reference style: His Eminence
- Spoken style: Your Eminence
- Informal style: Cardinal
- See: Bordeaux

Victor-Lucien-Sulpice Lécot (8 January 1831—19 December 1908) was a French archbishop and cardinal of the Catholic Church.

== Biography ==
He was born in Montescourt-Lizerolles, and studied at the Minor Seminary of Compiègne and Major Seminary of Beauvais. He was ordained to the priesthood on 24 June 1855, and then taught at the Minor Seminary of Dijon until 1858. He also served as vicar of the Cathedral of Beauvais (1858-1872), military chaplain in the French Army during the Franco-Prussian War and pastor of the church of Saint-Antoine in Compiègne (1872-1886).

On the 10 June 1886, he was appointed Bishop of Dijon by Pope Leo XIII. He received his consecration on the following 11 July from Bishop Joseph-Maxence Péronne, with Bishops Paul-François-Marie de Forges and François-Marie Duboin, C.S.Sp., serving as co-consecrators. He was later transferred to the Roman Catholic Archdiocese of Bordeaux on 26 June 1890.

Pope Leo XIII created him Cardinal Priest of the Basilica of Santa Pudenziana in the consistory of 12 June 1893. He participated in the Papal Conclave of 1903, which elected Pope Pius X.

He died in Chambéry, aged 77. He is buried in the Metropolitan Cathedral of St. Andrew in Bordeaux.

Catholic Church titles
Preceded by Aime Guilbert	Archbishop of Bordeaux; 3 June 1890–19 December 1908	Succeeded by Pierre Andrieu
