= Antonio Vico (cardinal) =

His Eminence Antonio Vico
- Prefect of the Sacred Congregation of Rites
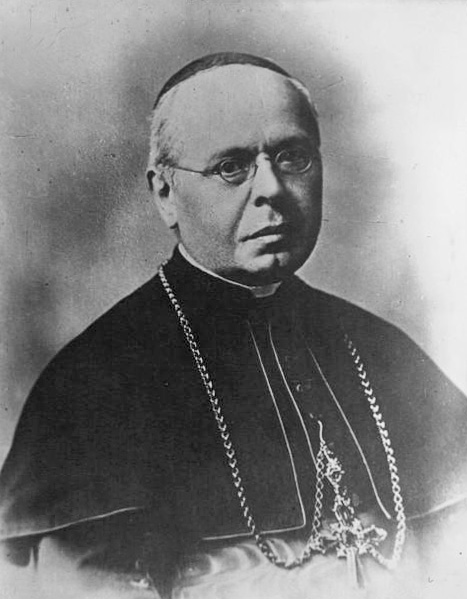
- Cardinal Vico (press photograph)
- Church: Catholic Church
- In office: 11 February 1915–29 February 1929
- Predecessor: Scipione Tecchi
- Successor: Camillo Laurenti
- Other post: Cardinal-Bishop of Porto e Santa Rufina (1915–1929)
- Previous posts: Apostolic Delegate to Colombia (1897–1907), Apostolic Nuncio to Belgium (1904–1907)

Personal details
- Born: 9 January 1847 Agugliano, Marche, Italy
- Died: 25 February 1929 (aged 82) Rome, Italy
- Education: Almo Collegio Capranica, Pontifical Gregorian University

Ordination history
History
Priestly ordination
- Place: Ancona, Marche, Italy
Episcopal consecration
- Principal consecrator: Mariano Rampolla
- Co-consecrators: Cesare Sambucetti, Antonino Sardi
- Place: Almo Collegio Capranica, Rome, Italy
Cardinalate
- Elevated by: Pope Pius X

Styles of Antonio Vico
- Reference style: His Eminence
- Spoken style: Your Eminence
- Informal style: Cardinal
- See: Porto e Santa Rufina (suburbicarian diocese)

Antonio Vico S.T.D. J.U.D. (9 January 1847 – 25 February 1929) was a Cardinal of the Roman Catholic Church and former Prefect of the Sacred Congregation of Rites.

== Biography ==
Vico was born in Agugliano, Italy. He was educated at the Collegio Capranica in Rome and from 1873 until 1876 he studied at the Pontifical Gregorian University where he earned doctorates in philosophy, theology and a doctorate in both civil and canon law.

He was ordained on 20 September 1873 in Ancona. He did pastoral work in the diocese of Rome from 1876 until 1877. He served as the secretary of the nunciature in Spain from 1877 until 1880 and was Secretary of the apostolic delegation in Constantinople until 1883. He served as Auditor of the nunciature in France from 1883 until 1887 and of the nunciature in Spain until 1893 and in of the nunciature in Portugal from 1893 until 1897. He was created a Papal Antechamber on 25 May 1886.

=== Episcopate ===
He was appointed titular Archbishop of Philippi by Pope Leo XIII on 22 December 1897. He served as Apostolic Delegate to Colombia from 1897 and as Apostolic Nuncio to Belgium from 1904 and to Spain until 1907.

=== Cardinalate ===
He was created and proclaimed Cardinal-Priest of San Callisto in the consistory of 27 November 1911 by Pope Pius X. He participated in the conclave of 1914 that elected Pope Benedict XV. Pope Benedict appointed him Prefect of the Sacred Congregation of Rites on 11 February 1915. He was elected to the order of cardinal bishops, taking the suburbicarian see of Porto e Santa Rufina on 6 December 1915. He participated in the conclave of 1922 that elected Pope Pius XI. He died in Rome in 1929 at the age of 82.

== Episcopal succession ==
Having consecrated Filippo Cortesi to the episcopacy, Cardinal Vico is in the episcopal lineage of Pope Francis.

Catholic Church titles
Preceded by Scipione Tecchi	Prefect of the Sacred Congregation of Rites; 11 February 1915 – 25 February 1929	Succeeded by Camillo Laurenti
Preceded by Serafino Vannutelli	Cardinal-Bishop of Porto and Santa-Rufina; 6 December 1915 – 25 February 1929	Succeeded by Tommaso Boggiani
