= Camillo Laurenti =

Italian cardinal

His Eminence Camillo Laurenti
- Prefect of the Sacred Congregation of Rites
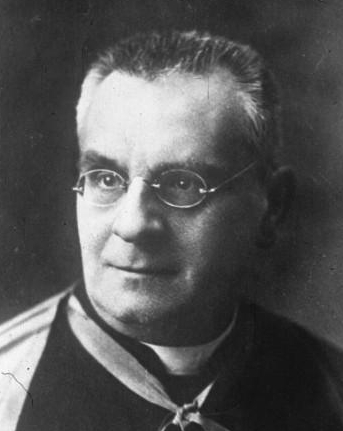
- Laurenti in 1922
- Appointed: 12 March 1929
- Term ended: 6 September 1938
- Predecessor: Antonio Vico
- Successor: Carlo Salotti
- Other post: Cardinal-Deacon of Santa Maria della Scala
- Previous posts: Secretary of the Congregation for the Propagation of the Faith (1911–1921); Prefect of the Sacred Congregation of Religious (1922–1928); Cardinal Protodeacon (1928–1935)

Orders
- Ordination: 7 June 1884
- Created cardinal: 13 June 1921 by Pope Benedict XV
- Rank: Cardinal-Deacon

Personal details
- Born: Camillo Laurenti; 20 November 1861 Monte Porzio Catone, Latium, Papal States
- Died: 6 September 1938 (aged 76) Rome, Italy
- Buried: Campo Verano
- Denomination: Roman Catholic
- Motto: Stella Matutina ("Morning star")
- Coat of arms

Styles of Camillo Laurenti
- Reference style: His Eminence
- Spoken style: Your Eminence
- Informal style: Cardinal
- See: None

Camillo Laurenti (20 November 1861 – 6 September 1938) was an Italian Cardinal of the Roman Catholic Church. He served as Prefect of the Sacred Congregation of Rites from 1929 until his death, and was elevated to the cardinalate in 1921.

== Biography ==
=== Early life ===
Camillo Laurenti was born in Monte Porzio Catone, and studied at the Pontifical Gregorian University in Rome, from where he obtained his doctorates in philosophy and in theology. He attended Capranica College as well. Laurenti was ordained to the priesthood on 7 June 1884, and became an official of the Sacred Congregation for the Propagation of the Faith on the following 1 September.

Whilst serving as professor of philosophy at the Pontifical Urbanian Athenaeum De Propaganda Fide (1892–1908), he was raised to the rank of Privy Chamberlain Supernumerary on 3 August 1889. Laurenti returned to the Roman Curia on 20 October 1908 as Undersecretary of the Congregation for the Propagation of the Faith. He was later named Domestic Prelate of His Holiness on 12 June 1909, and Secretary of the Propagation of the Faith on 12 August 1911. As Secretary, he served as the second-highest official of that dicastery, successively under Cardinals Girolamo Maria Gotti, Domenico Serafini, and Willem van Rossum.

=== Cardinalate ===
Pope Benedict XV created him Cardinal-Deacon of S. Maria della Scala in the consistory of 13 June 1921. Laurenti participated in the 1922 papal conclave. He was selected Pope, but according to The Compact History Of The Popes, "he refused to accept the honor". Voting continued and Pope Pius XI was selected. Pope Pius XI then appointed Laurenti Prefect of Sacred Congregation of Religious on 5 July of that same year.

After six years as the Vatican overseer of all Roman Catholic religious institutes, the Cardinal was made Pro-Prefect of the Sacred Congregation of Rites on 17 December 1928, rising to become full Prefect on 12 March 1929. He opted for the order of Cardinal Priests on 16 December 1935 and retained his titular church.

=== Death and burial ===
Laurenti died in Rome, at age 76 of a heart attack, and is buried at the Campo Verano.

Catholic Church titles
Preceded by Teodoro Valfre di Bonzo	Prefect of Sacred Congregation of Religious; 5 July 1922 – 17 December 1928	Succeeded by Alexis Lépicier
Preceded by Antonio Vico	Prefect of the Sacred Congregation of Rites; 12 March 1929 – 6 September 1938	Succeeded by Carlo Salotti
Preceded by Gaetano Bisleti	Cardinal Protodeacon; 17 December 1928 – 16 December 1935	Succeeded by Camillo Caccia-Dominioni
