= Scipione Tecchi =

His Eminence Scipione Tecchi
- Pro-Prefect of the Congregation for Rites
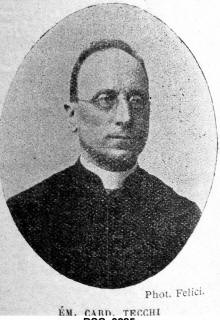
- Tecchi pictured in 1906.
- Church: Roman Catholic Church
- Appointed: 8 November 1914
- Term ended: 7 February 1915
- Predecessor: Luigi Tripepi
- Successor: Antonio Vico
- Other post: Cardinal-Deacon of Santa Maria in Domnica (1914-15)
- Previous posts: Assessor of the Consistorial Congregation (1908-14); Secretary of the College of Cardinals (1908-14)

Orders
- Ordination: 23 December 1876
- Created cardinal: 25 May 1914 by Pope Pius X
- Rank: Cardinal-Deacon

Personal details
- Born: Scipione Tecchi; 27 June 1854 Rome, Papal States
- Died: 7 February 1915 (aged 60) Rome, Kingdom of Italy
- Buried: Campo Verano
- Education: Pontifical Roman Seminary

Styles of Scipione Tecchi
- Reference style: His Eminence
- Spoken style: Your Eminence
- Informal style: Cardinal
- See: none

Scipione Tecchi J.C.D. S.T.D. (27 June 1854 – 7 February 1915) was a Cardinal of the Roman Catholic Church who served as Prefect of the Congregation of Rites.

== Early life and priesthood ==
Tecchi was born in Rome, Italy. He was educated at the Pontifical Roman Seminary where he was awarded doctorates in theology and canon law.

He was ordained on 23 December 1876 in Rome. After his ordination, he did pastoral work in the diocese of Rome from 1877 until 1908. He also worked as a scriptor of the Apostolic Penitentiary. He was created Privy chamberlain supernumerary on 22 December 1893. He was also beneficiary coadjutor of the chapter of the patriarchal Vatican Basilica in 1899 as well as being canon of the patriarchal Lateran Basilica. He was raised to the rank of Domestic Prelate on 6 May 1901 and finally Protonotary apostolicon 27 September of that year.

== Cardinalate ==
He was made a cardinal by Pope Pius X Cardinal-Deacon of Santa Maria in Domnica in the consistory of 25 May 1914, in which the future Pope Benedict XV was also made a cardinal. Tecchi participated in the conclave of 1914 that elected Benedict XV. He was appointed as Prefect of the Congregation of Rites on 8 November 1914, holding the post until his death in early 1915. He was buried at the Campo Verano cemetery.

Catholic Church titles
Preceded by Sebastiano Martinelli	Prefect of the Congregation of Rites; 8 November 1914–22 January 1915	Succeeded by Antonio Vico
