= Gaetano Bisleti =

Catholic cardinal (1856–1937)

His Eminence Gaetano Bisleti
- Prefect of the Congregation of Seminaries and Universities
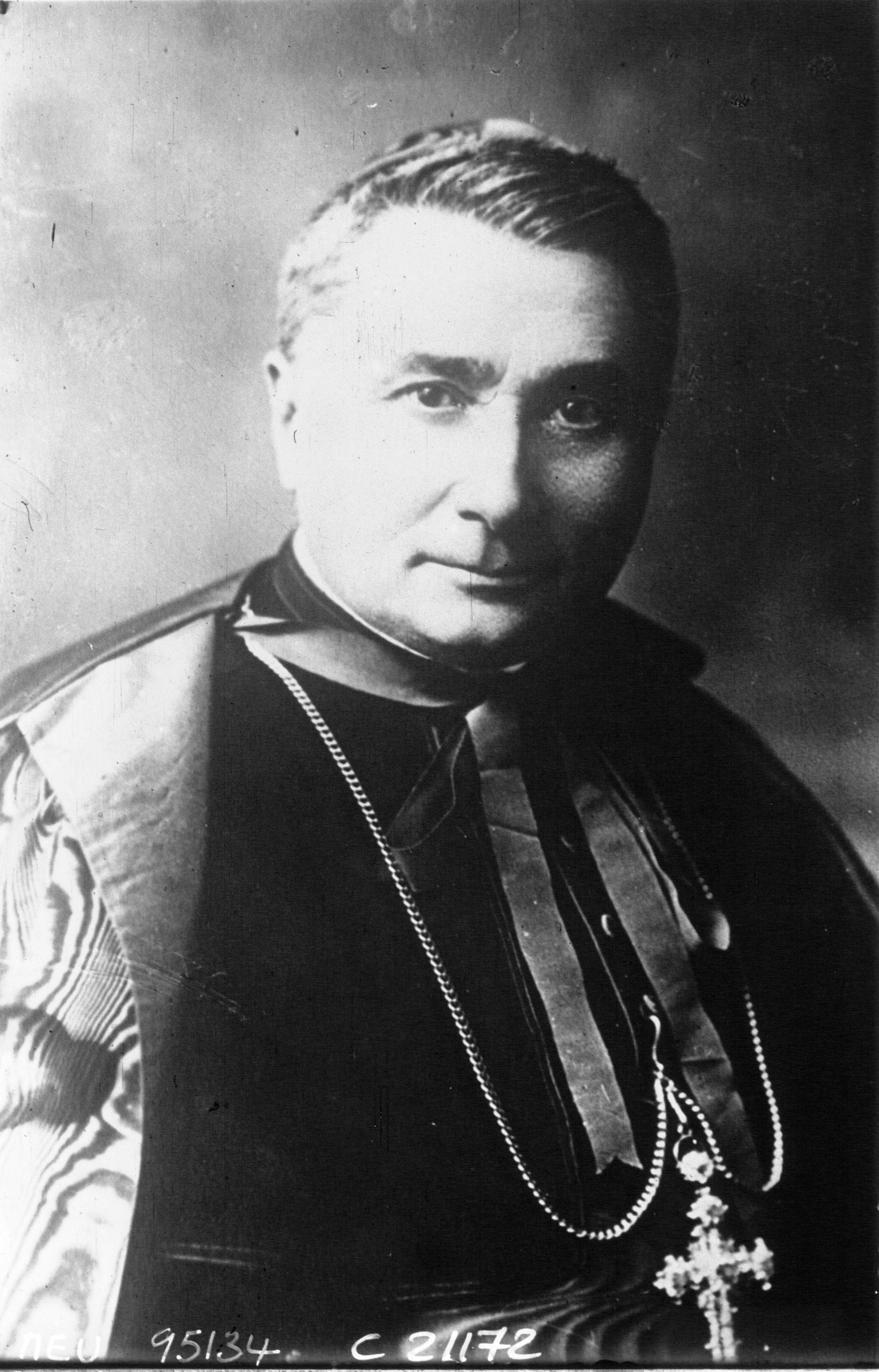
- Cardinal Bisleti pictured in 1922.
- Church: Roman Catholic Church
- Appointed: 1 December 1915
- Term ended: 30 August 1937
- Predecessor: None - office established
- Successor: Giuseppe Pizzardo
- Other posts: Cardinal-Protector of the Pontifical Ecclesiastical Academy (1914-37); Cardinal-Priest of Sant'Agata de' Goti pro hac vice (1928-37); President of the Pontifical Commission for Biblical Studies (1932-37)
- Previous posts: Cardinal-Deacon of Sant'Agata de' Goti (1911-28); Protodeacon (1916-28)

Orders
- Ordination: 20 September 1878
- Created cardinal: 27 November 1911 by Pope Pius X
- Rank: Cardinal-Deacon (1911-28); Cardinal-Priest (1928-37)

Personal details
- Born: Gaetano Bisleti; 20 March 1856 Veroli, Papal States
- Died: 30 August 1937 (aged 81) Grottaferrata, Kingdom of Italy
- Buried: Santuario della Madonna dell'Olivella di Veroli
- Education: Pontifical Academy of Ecclesiastical Nobles
- Coat of arms

Styles of Gaetano Bisleti
- Reference style: His Eminence
- Spoken style: Your Eminence
- Informal style: Cardinal
- See: none

Gaetano Bisleti S.T.D. (20 March 1856 – 30 August 1937) was a Cardinal of the Roman Catholic Church and was former Prefect of the Sacred Congregation for Catholic Education.

== Biography ==
Gaetano Bisleti was born in Veroli, Italy. He was educated at the Seminary of Tivoli and the Pontifical Academy of Ecclesiastical Nobles, where he obtained a doctorate in theology in 1879.

Bisleti was ordained on 20 September 1878. He was appointed Canon and archdeacon of the cathedral chapter of Veroli where he served until 1884. He was created Privy chamberlain de numero participantium on 20 December 1884. He was raised to the level of Domestic prelate and master of papal chamber on 29 May 1901. He was awarded the numerous orders and decorations:

- Commander of the Order of the Crown of Prussia
- Commander of the Order of Ferdinand IV of Tuscany
- Commander of the Order of the Crown of Siam
- Grand Cross of the Royal Saxon Albrecht Order 09.03.1906
- Knight grand Cross in the Order of the Immaculate Conception of Vila Viçosa. 1909
- medal Pro Ecclesia et Pontifice.

In May and June 1907, when Bisleti was still a Monsignor and Maggiodomo di Sua Santita, the Swiss-born American artist Adolfo Müller-Ury (1862-1947) who was in Rome painting a large portrait of Pope Pius X (North American College, Via dei Umilta, Rome), and had painted two portraits of Cardinal Rafael Merry del Val, also completed a portrait of Bisleti, a fact that was recorded in the New York Herald on Sunday 27 December 1908.

== Cardinalate ==
He was created and proclaimed Cardinal-Deacon of S. Agata in Suburra by Pope Pius X in the consistory of 27 November 1911. He served as Grand prior of the Sovereign Military Order of Malta from 2 January 1914. He participated in the conclave of 1914 that elected Pope Benedict XV. Pope Benedict appointed him as the first Prefect of the Congregation for Seminaries and Universities on 1 December 1915. He was a Cardinal Elector in the conclave of 1922 that elected Pope Pius XI. As cardinal protodeacon he announced the election of Pius XI and crowned the new pope with the Papal Tiara on 12 February 1922. In October 1911 he married the future Emperor of Austria-Hungary Charles I of Austria (from the Habsburg family) with his wife Zita of Bourbon-Parma. He was Cardinal Protodeacon, that is the longest serving Cardinal Deacon from 1916 until 1928. He then opted for the order of cardinal priests and his deaconry was elevated pro hac vice to title on 17 December 1928.

He died in 1937 in Grottaferrata.

Catholic Church titles
Preceded by none, newly established	Prefect of the Sacred Congregation for Catholic Education; 1 December 1915–30 August 1937	Succeeded by Giuseppe Pizzardo
Preceded by Francesco Salesio Della Volpe	Cardinal Protodeacon; 1916–1928	Succeeded by Camillo Laurenti
