= José María Martín de Herrera y de la Iglesia =

His Eminence José María Martín de Herrera y de la Iglesia
- Archbishop of Santiago de Compostela
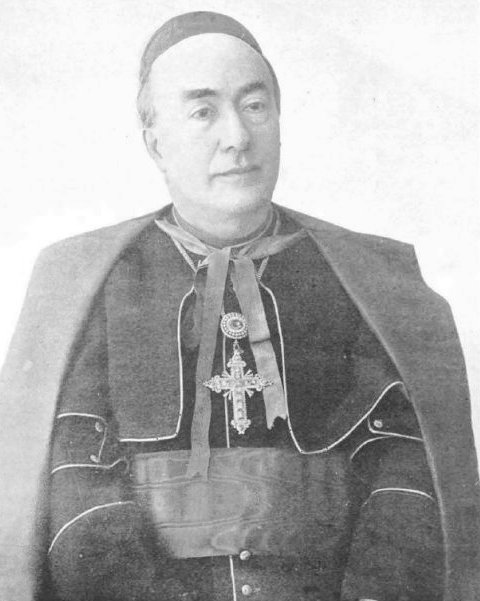
- The cardinal pictured in 1897.
- Church: Roman Catholic Church
- Archdiocese: Santiago de Compostela
- See: Santiago de Compostela
- Appointed: 14 February 1889
- Term ended: 8 December 1922
- Predecessor: Victoriano Guisasola y Rodríguez
- Successor: Manuel Lago y González
- Other post: Cardinal-Priest of Santa Maria in Traspontina (1898–1922)
- Previous post: Archbishop of Santiago de Cuba (1875–89)

Orders
- Ordination: September 1859
- Consecration: 3 October 1875 by Juan de la Cruz Ignacio Moreno y Maisanove
- Created cardinal: 19 April 1897 by Pope Leo XIII
- Rank: Cardinal-Priest

Personal details
- Born: José María Martín de Herrera y de la Iglesia; 26 August 1835 Aldeadávila de la Ribera, Salamanca, Spanish Kingdom
- Died: 8 December 1922 (aged 87) Santiago de Compostela, Kingdom of Spain
- Buried: Santiago de Compostela Cathedral
- Parents: Francisco Martín de Herrera; Rafaela Iglesias
- Education: University of Salamanca
- Motto: Cor Jesus caritatis victima

Styles of José María Martín de Herrera y de la Iglesia
- Reference style: His Eminence
- Spoken style: Your Eminence
- Informal style: Cardinal
- See: Santiago de Compostela

José María Martín de Herrera y de la Iglesia (26 August 1835 in Aldeadávila de la Ribera, Spain – 8 December 1922 in Santiago de Compostela, Spain) was a long-serving cardinal in the Roman Catholic Church in the early years of the twentieth century. Unusually, he served as archbishop of dioceses in more than one different country, being both archbishop of Santiago de Cuba and of Santiago de Compostela during his career in the Church.

Ordained in September 1859, José María Martín quickly showed his ability in theology and canon law. However, rather than become a theology professor he spent the following seventeen years in pastoral work before he was chosen as an Archbishop of Santiago de Cuba (in those days given to someone from Spain) at the relatively young age of forty (at the same time he was in the running to become Auditor of the Roman Rota).

Although he was aided by several other prominent Spaniards in administering his Cuban diocese, José María Martín was eventually returned to Spain in the more prestigious role of Archbishop of Santiago de Compostela in 1889. He was elevated to Cardinal by Pope Leo XIII in 1897 and participated in the 1903 and 1914 papal conclaves. However, by the time of the 1922 conclave Cardinal Martín was much too old to travel to Rome and thus he excused himself from participating. He died in December of that year.
