= Pierre Andrieu =

French Cardinal

His Eminence Pierre-Paulin Andrieu
- Archbishop of Bordeaux
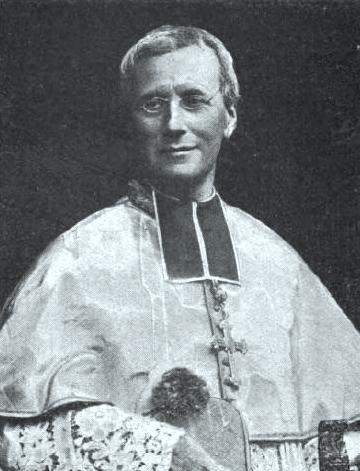
- The then-bishop pictured on 21 January 1907.
- Church: Roman Catholic Church
- Archdiocese: Bordeaux
- See: Bordeaux
- Appointed: 2 January 1909
- Term ended: 15 February 1935
- Predecessor: Victor-Lucien-Sulpice Lécot
- Successor: Maurice Feltin
- Other post: Cardinal-Priest of Sant'Onofrio (1907-35)
- Previous post: Bishop of Marseille (1901-09)

Orders
- Ordination: 30 May 1874 by Julien-Florian-Félix Desprez
- Consecration: 25 July 1901 by Jean-Augustin Germain
- Created cardinal: 16 December 1907 by Pope Pius X
- Rank: Cardinal-Priest

Personal details
- Born: Pierre-Paulin Andrieu; 7 December 1849 Seysses, Haute-Garonne, French Second Republic
- Died: 15 February 1935 (aged 85) Bordeaux, French Third Republic
- Buried: Bordeaux Cathedral
- Parents: Joseph Andrieu; Jeanne Marie Sancholle
- Motto: In pax tua virtute
- Coat of arms

Styles of Pierre Andrieu
- Reference style: His Eminence
- Spoken style: Your Eminence
- Informal style: Cardinal
- See: Bordeaux et Bazes

Pierre-Paulin Andrieu (7 December 1849 – 15 February 1935) was a French Cardinal of the Roman Catholic Church and archbishop of Bordeaux et Bazes.

He was educated at the Seminary of Toulouse in Toulouse, France. He was ordained to the priesthood on 30 May 1874. He worked as a priest doing pastoral work from 1874 for a year. He was chosen by Julien-Florian-Félix Desprez, the Archbishop of Toulouse, to be his secretary until 1880.

== Episcopate ==
Pope Leo XIII appointed Andrieu Bishop of Marseille on 18 April 1901. He was consecrated on 25 July 1901 in the Cathedral of Toulouse.

== Cardinalate ==
Bishop Andrieu was created and proclaimed Cardinal-Priest of S. Onofrio in the consistory of 16 December 1907 by Pope Pius X. He was appointed to the metropolitan see of Bordeaux on 2 January 1909. He took part in the conclaves of 1914 which elected Pope Benedict XV, and of 1922, which elected Pope Pius XI. As Archbishop he issued the first condemnation of a member of the French hierarchy against L'Action Française in 1926.

He died on 15 February 1935 in Bordeaux, aged 85.

== Sources ==
- Bräuer, Martin (27 February 2014). Handbuch der Kardinäle: 1846-2012 (in German). Berlin: De Gruyter. pp. 209–210. ISBN 978-3-11-026947-5.

Catholic Church titles
Preceded by Joseph Robert	Bishop of Marseille; 18 April 1901–2 January 1909	Succeeded by Joseph-Marie Fabre
Preceded by Victor Lecot	Archbishop of Bordeaux; 2 January 1909–15 February 1935	Succeeded by Maurice Feltin
Records
Preceded by Franz Ehrle S.J.	Oldest living Member of the College of Cardinals; 31 March 1934 - 15 February 1935	Succeeded by Gennaro Granito Pignatelli di Belmonte
