= Pietro Gasparri =

Italian Catholic cardinal, diplomat, and politician (1851–1934)

His Eminence Pietro Gasparri GCTE
- Cardinal Secretary of State
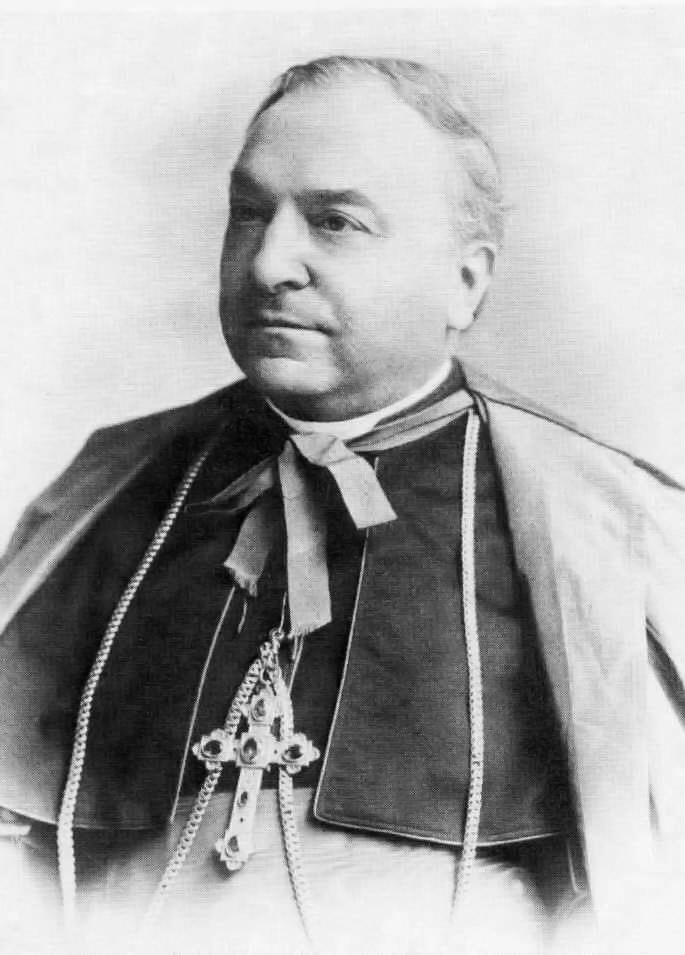
- Pietro Gasparri
- Installed: 13 October 1914
- Term ended: 7 February 1930
- Predecessor: Domenico Ferrata
- Successor: Eugenio Pacelli
- Other post: Cardinal-Priest of San Lorenzo in Lucina (1915–1934)
- Previous posts: Apostolic Delegate to Peru (1898–1901); Titular Archbishop of Caesarea (1898–1907); Secretary of the Sacred Congregation for Extraordinary Ecclesiastical Affairs (1901–1904); Cardinal-Priest of San Bernardo alle Terme (1907–1915); Camerlengo of the Sacred College of Cardinals (1914–1915); Camerlengo of the Holy Roman Church (1916–1934); Prefect of the Sacred Congregation for Extraordinary Ecclesiastical Affairs (1925–1930)

Orders
- Ordination: 31 March 1877
- Consecration: 6 March 1898 by François-Marie-Benjamin Richard
- Created cardinal: 16 December 1907 by Pope Pius X
- Rank: Cardinal-Priest

Personal details
- Born: Pietro Gasparri; 5 May 1852 Ussita, Papal States
- Died: 18 November 1934 (aged 82) Rome, Kingdom of Italy
- Buried: Ussita
- Denomination: Catholicism
- Parents: Bernardino Gasparri and Giovanna Sili

- Coat of arms

Pietro Gasparri GCTE (5 May 1852 – 18 November 1934) was an Italian Catholic prelate who served as a diplomat and politician in the Roman Curia, including as the Vatican signatory of the Lateran Treaty. He also served as Cardinal Secretary of State under Popes Benedict XV and Pius XI.

== Biography ==
=== Early life ===
Gasparri was born on 5 May 1852 in Capovallazza di Ussita, a small village in the Apennine Mountains in central Italy (in the modern province of Macerata, then part of the Papal States). His parents were Bernardino Gasparri and Giovanna Sili. The youngest of 10 children born to a family of shepherds, Pietro was the favorite.

His cousin went on to become Cardinal Augusto Silj.

Pietro was a weak and sickly child, while his 9 siblings were strong and vivacious; some thought that he would not live long. His father would often sleep in the fields with the sheep, and Pietro entertained the family by reading stories of saints as the family was gathered by the warmth of the hearth. They would all be brought to tears as they listened to the stories of the martyrs. Pietro's mother had the "gift of tears", which she gave to all her children, especially Pietro, according to his memoir.

=== Canonical scholar and curial diplomat ===
He was for many years the head of the Department of Canon Law at the Catholic University of Paris, where he was a professor from 1880 to 1898. He served as the Apostolic delegate to Bolivia, Ecuador, and Peru from 1898 to 1901, when he became a member of the Curia and returned to Rome.

Shortly after becoming pope, Pius X asked Gasparri how long it would take to codify canon law. Gasparri answered that, with sufficient staff, it could be done in 25 years. Pius X replied, "Then do it". Gasparri was called to Rome in 1904 to take the post of Secretary for the Commission for the Codification of Canon Law, in which he spent the next 13 years in seclusion, digesting volumes of decrees and studies compiled over centuries to create the first definitive legal text in the history of Catholicism. His efforts resulted in the 1917 Code of Canon Law, in effect until 1983. On 18 October 1917, Pope Benedict named him the first president of the newly created Pontifical Commission for Authentic Interpretation of the Code of Canon Law. Beginning in 1929, he also played a significant role in early stages of the codification of Eastern Catholic canon law.

=== Secretary of State ===
He was made a Cardinal-Priest of S. Bernardo alle Terme in 1907. In January 1915, he chose to become Cardinal-Priest of San Lorenzo in Lucina, however, he retained in commendam his former title until December 1915.

He served as the Cardinal Secretary of State under Popes Benedict XV and Pius XI, beginning with his appointment on 13 October 1914.

On 4 December 1916, he became Camerlengo of the Holy Roman Church.

=== 1922 conclave ===
In the 1922 conclave that elected Pope Pius XI, Gasparri was the "champion of the moderates" who wanted to continue Pope Benedict XV's more centrist policies vis-à-vis the modern world. He was 69 years old and considered a possible compromise candidate for the papacy.

=== Retirement and death ===
By 1928, Gasparri was suffering from heart disease and diabetes, slept poorly, and—despite Pius XI's urging—refused to take time off, fearing that the pope would replace him in his absence. For years, he had been receiving signals that his services were no longer valued by the pope.

He submitted his resignation as Secretary of State and after several weeks Pope Pius accepted it on 7 October 1930.

Gasparri died on 18 November 1934. At his death, he was still President of the Pontifical Commission for the Authentic Interpretation of the Code of Canon Law, President of the Pontifical Commission for the Codification of the Canon Law of the Eastern Churches, and Camerlengo.

== Canon Law reform ==
In response to the request of the bishops at the First Vatican Council, Pope Pius X ordered the creation of a general Roman Catholic canon law codification, which did not exist at that time. He entrusted Pietro Gasparri, who was aided in the work by Giacomo della Chiesa (the future Benedict XV) and Eugenio Pacelli (the future Pius XII). Perhaps the ablest canonist in the Roman Curia at the time, the work of codification, simplification, and modernization of canon law was for the most part the work of Gasparri.

Work began with collecting and reducing diverse documents into a single code, presenting the normative portion in the form of systematic short canons shorn of the preliminary considerations ("Whereas ..." etc.) and omitting those parts that had been superseded by later developments. The code was promulgated on 27 May 1917 as The Code of Canon Law (Latin: Codex Iuris Canonici) by Pope Benedict XV, who set 19 May 1918 as the date on which it came into force. For the most part, it applied only to the Latin Church except when "it treats of things that, by their nature, apply to the Oriental", such as the effects of baptism (cf. canon 87). In the succeeding decades, some parts of the 1917 Code were retouched, especially under Pope Pius XII.

== Papal diplomacy ==
Under Gasparri's leadership, the Vatican successfully concluded a record number of diplomatic agreements with European governments, many of which heading new states, created after World War I. On 29 March 1924, a concordat was signed between Gasparri and Bavaria, with France on 10 February 1925, Czechoslovakia on 17 December 1927, Portugal on 15 April 1928, and Romania on 19 May 1932.

=== Lateran Treaty ===
The Lateran Treaty is the crowning achievement of Pietro Gasparri, as it ended the sixty-year conflict between the Vatican and the Kingdom of Italy. It was signed on 11 February 1929, with Mussolini himself signing on behalf of Italy. It includes three agreements made in 1929 between the Kingdom of Italy and the Holy See, ratified on 7 June 1929, thus ending the "Roman Question". Main Vatican negotiator for Pietro Gasparri was the Roman lawyer Francesco Pacelli, the brother of then-Apostolic Nuncio to Germany Eugenio Pacelli (the future Pope Pius XII). On the day of the signing, before leaving for the Lateran Palace, Gasparri met with Pius XI in order for him to approve the final draft of the agreements. After kneeling for the pope's blessing, Gasparri left the room with tears in his eyes, feeling the enormous importance of what would take place later that day.

=== Russia and the Soviet Union ===
Gasparri's watch in the Vatican coincided with major changes in Europe after World War I. With the Russian Revolution, the Vatican was faced with a new, so far unknown situation, an ideology and government which rejected not only the Catholic Church but religion as a whole.

=== Lithuania and Estonia ===
Gasparri managed to conclude a concordat with Lithuania. The relations with Russia changed drastically for a second reason. The Baltic states and Poland gained their independence from Russia after World War I, thus enabling a relatively free Church life in those former Russian countries. Estonia was the first country to look for Vatican ties. On 11 April 1919, Secretary of State Pietro Gasparri informed the Estonian authorities that the Vatican would agree to have diplomatic relations. A concordat was agreed upon in principle a year later, June 1920. It was signed on 30 May 1922. It guarantees freedom for the Catholic Church, establishes an archdiocese, liberates clergy from military service, allows the creation of seminaries and catholic schools, describes church property rights and immunity. The Archbishop swears alliance to Estonia.

Relations with Catholic Lithuania were slightly more complicated because of the Polish occupation of Vilnius, a city and archiepiscopal seat, which Lithuania claimed as well as its own, though the majority of its population was Polish and it was a major center of Polish culture. Polish forces had occupied Vilnius. This generated several protests of Lithuania to the Holy See. Relations with the Holy See were defined during the pontificate of Pope Pius XI (1922–1939).

Lithuania was recognized by the Vatican in November 1922. The recognition included a stipulation by Pietro Gasparri to Lithuania. There were diplomatic standstills, as the Lithuanian government refused to accept virtually all episcopal appointments by the Vatican. The relations did not improve when, in April 1926, Pope Pius XI unilaterally established and reorganized the Lithuanian ecclesiastical province without regard to Lithuanian demands and proposals, the real bone of contention being Vilnius which belonged to Poland.

In autumn 1925, Mečislovas Reinys, a Catholic professor of theology, became the Lithuanian foreign minister and asked for an agreement. The Lithuanian military took over a year later and a proposal of a concordat, drafted by the papal visitator Jurgis Matulaitis-Matulevičius, was agreed upon by the end of 1926. The concordat was signed a year later. Its content follows largely the Polish Concordat of 1925.

=== Poland ===
In October 1918, Pope Benedict XV congratulated the Polish people on their independence. In a public letter to the archbishop Kakowski of Warsaw, he remembered their loyalty and the many efforts of the Holy See to assist them. He expressed his hopes that Poland would again take its place in the family of nations and continue its history as an educated Christian nation. In March 1919, he nominated ten new bishops and, soon after, Achille Ratti, already in Warsaw as his representative, as papal nuncio. He repeatedly cautioned Polish authorities against persecuting Lithuanian and Ruthenian clergy. During the Bolshevik advance against Warsaw, he asked for worldwide public prayers for Poland. Gasparri sent Nuncio Ratti to stay in the Polish capital. On 11 June 1921, he wrote to the Polish episcopate, warning against political misuses of spiritual power, urging again peaceful coexistence with neighbouring people, stating that "love of country has its limits in justice and obligations". He sent nuncio Ratti to Silesia to act against potential political agitations of the Catholic clergy.

Ratti, a scholar, intended to work for Poland and build bridges to the Soviet Union, hoping even to shed his blood for Russia. Pope Benedict XV needed him as a diplomat and not as a martyr and forbade any trip into the USSR, although he was the official papal delegate for Russia. Therefore, he discontinued his contact with Russia. This did not generate much sympathy for him within Poland at the time. He was asked to go. "While he tried honestly to show himself as a friend of Poland, Warsaw forced his departure, after his neutrality in Silesian voting was questioned" by Germans and Poles. Nationalistic Germans objected to a Polish nuncio supervising elections, and Poles were upset because he curtailed agitating clergy. November 20, when German Cardinal Adolf Bertram announced a papal ban on all political activities of clergymen, calls for Ratti's expulsion climaxed in Warsaw. Two years later, Achille Ratti became Pope Pius XI, shaping Vatican policies towards Poland with Pietro Gasparri and Eugenio Pacelli for the following thirty-six years. (1922–1958)

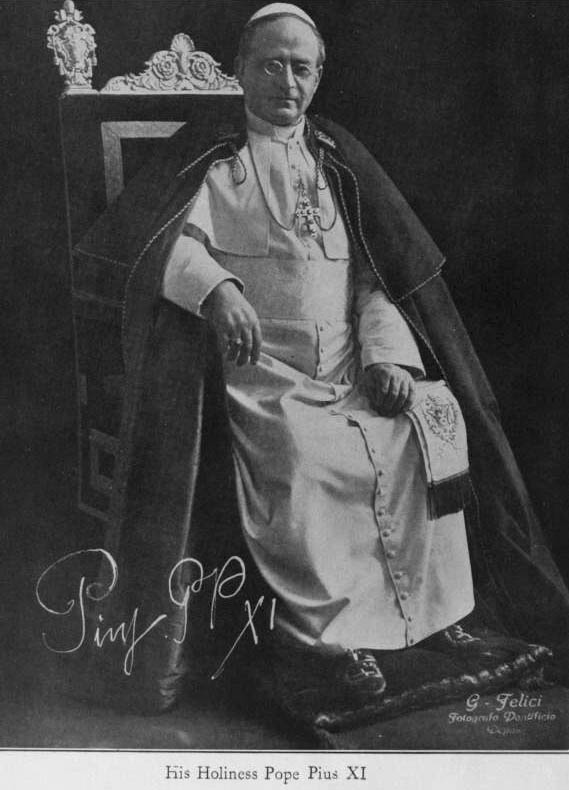
Pope Pius XI (1922–1939) Warsaw forced his departure as Nuncio. Two years later, he was Pope. He signed concordats with numerous countries including Lithuania and Poland

During the pontificate of Pope Pius XI,(1922–1939) Church life in Poland flourished: There were some anti-clerical groups opposing the new role of the Church especially in education. But numerous religious meetings and congresses, feasts and pilgrimages, many of which were accompanied by supportive letters from the Pontiff, took place.

Under the pontificate of Pope Pius XI, his Cardinal Secretary of State Pietro Gasparri with unusual candour expressed his views on the post-war order and the future of Poland: He told Ludwig von Pastor that the Peace Treaty of Versailles will most certainly end in a new war, maybe even ten wars. He expressed his pleasure at the outcome of the Locarno treaty. However, the Polish Corridor continued to be a dark point in his estimation, requiring compromises. At the same time, he opined, Poland can only exist if she works either with her neighbour in the East or West. Since the Soviet Union could not be relied upon, he considered it "outright stupid, to destroy bridges to the West. Poland will have to pay dearly later on, once Germany recuperates".

==== Concordat with Poland ====
On 10 February 1925, a concordat (Concordat of 1925) was signed between Pietro Gasparri, Cardinal Secretary of State for the Vatican, and Stanislaw Grabski for Poland. The concordat has 27 articles, which guarantee the freedom of the Church and the faithful. It regulates the usual points of interests, Catholic instruction in primary schools and secondary schools, nomination of bishops, establishment of seminaries, and a permanent nuncio in Warsaw, who also represents the interests of the Holy See in Gdańsk. The concordat stipulates, that no part of Polish territory can be placed under the jurisdiction of a bishop outside of Poland

The Church enjoys full protection of the State, and prays for the leaders of Poland during Sunday Mass and on 3 May. Clerics make a solemn oath of allegiance to the Polish State If clergy are under accusation, trial documents will be forwarded to ecclesiastical authorities if clergy are accused of crimes. If convicted, they will not serve incarceration in jails but will be handed over to Church authorities for internment in a monastery or convent. The concordat extends to the Latin rite in five ecclesiastical provinces of Gniezno and Poznan, Varsovie, Wilno, Lwow and Cracovie. It applies as well to united Catholics of the Greco-Ruthenian rite in Lwow, and Przemysl, and, to the Armenian rite in Lwow. for religious celebration in the specific rites, Canon law must be observed. Catholic instruction is mandatory in all public schools, except universities. In Article 24 Church and State recognize each other's property rights seeming in part from the time of partition before 1918. This means, property rights and real estate titles of the Church are respected. A later agreement will define the status of expropriated Church properties. Until that time, the State will pay Church endowments for its clergy. On paper the concordat seemed to be a victory for the Church. But Polish bishops felt forced to take measures against early violations, in the area of marriage legislation and property rights. Pope Pius XI was supportive of this and of episcopal initiatives to have their own plenary meetings.

In the Florestano Vancini's film The Assassination of Matteotti (1973), Gasparri is played by Michele Malaspina.

== Honours ==
=== Foreign Honours ===
Monaco:

- Grand Cross of the Order of Saint-Charles (8 February 1916)

Portugal:

- Grand Cross of the Order of the Tower and Sword (23 February 1929)

Spain:

- Grand Cross with Collar of the Order of Charles III (28 February 1924)

San Marino:

- Grand Cross of the Order of Saint Agatha
- Grand Cross of the Order of San Marino

== See also ==
- Cardinal Secretary of State
- Lateran Treaty
- Law of Guarantees
- Roman Question
- Secretariat of State (Holy See)
- State of Vatican City
- 1917 Code of Canon Law

== Bibliography ==
- Acta Apostolicae Sedis (AAS), Vatican City, 1922–1960
- Acta et decreta Pii IX, Pontificis Maximi, vol. I–VII, Rome, 1854
- Acta et decreta Leonis XIII, P.M., vol. I–XXII, Rome, 1881
- Acta Sanctae Sedis, (ASS), Vatican, 1865
- Clarkson, Jesse D. (1969), A History of Russia, New York: Random House
- Erzberger, Matthias (1920), Erlebnisse im weltkrieg, Stuttgart
- McCormick, Anne O'Hare (1957). Vatican Journal: 1921-1954 (New York: Farrar, Straus and Cudahy).
- Kertzer, David I. (2014), The Pope and Mussolini: The Secret History of Pius XI and the Rise of Fascism in Europe, New York: Random House
- La Due, William J., JCD (1999), The Chair of Saint Peter: A History of the Papacy, Maryknoll, NY: Orbis Books
- Peters, Walter H. (1959), The Life of Benedict XV, Milwaukee: The Bruce Publishing Company
- Restrepo, P J M (1934), Concordata Regnante Sanctissimo Domino Pio PP XI, Rome
- Rhodes, Anthony (1974), The Vatican in the Age of the Dictators, 1922-1945, New York, Chicago, San Francisco: Holt, Rinehart and Winston
- Riasanovsky, Nicholas V. (1963), A History of Russia, New York: Oxford University Press
- Schmidlin, Josef (1922–1939), Papstgeschichte (Papal History) (in German), Munich: Köstel-Pusztet
- Stehle, Hansjakob (1975), Die Ostpolitik des Vatikans, Munich: Piper
- Wehrlé, René (1928), De la coutume dans le droit canonique. Essai historique s'étendant des origines de l'Église au pontificat de Pie XI, Paris: Recueil Sirey

Catholic Church titles
Diplomatic posts
Vacant Title last held by Cesare Sambucetti	Apostolic Delegate to Peru; 26 March 1898 – 23 April 1901	Succeeded by Alessandro Bavona
Preceded by Aristide Rinaldini	Camerlengo of the Sacred College of Cardinals; 24 May 1914 – 22 January 1915	Succeeded by Antonio Vico
Preceded by Domenico Ferrata	Cardinal Secretary of State; 13 October 1914 – 7 February 1930	Succeeded by Eugenio Pacelli
Preceded by Francesco Salesio Della Volpe	Camerlengo of the Holy Roman Church; 4 December 1916 – 18 November 1934	Succeeded by Eugenio Pacelli
