= Augusto Silj =

His Eminence Augusto Silj
- Prefect of the Apostolic Signatura
- Church: Roman Catholic Church
- Appointed: 30 March 1920
- Term ended: 27 February 1926
- Predecessor: Michele Lega
- Successor: Francesco Ragonesi
- Other post: Cardinal-Priest of Santa Cecilia (1919–26)
- Previous posts: Almoner of the Office of Papal Charities (1906–16); Titular Archbishop of Caesarea Ponti (1906–19); Vice-Camerlengo of the Apostolic Camera (1916–20)

Orders
- Ordination: 4 April 1874 by Costantino Patrizi Naro
- Consecration: 13 January 1907 by Rafael Merry del Val y Zulueta
- Created cardinal: 15 December 1919 by Pope Benedict XV
- Rank: Cardinal-Priest

Personal details
- Born: Augusto Silj; 9 July 1846 Calcara, Ussita, Papal States
- Died: 27 February 1926 (aged 79) Rome, Kingdom of Italy
- Buried: Campo Verano
- Education: Pontifical Roman Seminary

Styles of Augusto Silj
- Reference style: His Eminence
- Spoken style: Your Eminence
- Informal style: Cardinal
- See: Cesarea in Mauretania (titular see)

Augusto Silj J.U.D. (9 July 1846 – 27 February 1926) was a Cardinal of the Roman Catholic Church who served as Prefect of the Supreme Tribunal of the Apostolic Signatura. He was the cousin of Cardinal Secretary of State Pietro Gasparri (1852-1934).

== Early life and priesthood ==
Augusto Silj was born in Calcara di Ussita, in the Marches. He entered the Seminary of Norcia and continued his education at the Pontifical Roman Seminary where he earned doctorates in philosophy and a doctorate in both canon and civil law.

He was ordained on 4 April 1874. He did pastoral work in the diocese of Rome and was at the same time rector of the hospice "dei Convertendi". He worked as a consultor for the Congregation for Bishops and Regulars and the Pontifical Commission for the Codification of Canon Law. He was created Domestic prelate of His Holiness on 7 July 1906.

== Episcopate ==
He was appointed as titular archbishop of Caesarea in Mauretania by Pope Pius X on 26 December 1906. He was consecrated on 13 January 1907, by Cardinal Secretary of State Rafael Merry del Val, assisted by Pietro Gasparri, Secretary of the Congregation of Extraordinary Ecclesiastical Affairs, and by Ercolano Marini, Bishop of Norcia. He was appointed a consultor of the Congregation of the Council on 4 November 1908.

== Cardinalate ==
He was created Cardinal-Priest of Santa Cecilia in Trastevere by Pope Benedict XV in the consistory of 15 December 1919. Pope Benedict appointed him Prefect of the Apostolic Signatura on 20 March 1920, a post he held until his death. He participated in conclave of 1922 that elected Pope Pius XI.

He died in 1926 and is buried at the Campo Verano cemetery. He wished to be buried in Ussita, next to the baptismal font of the church of Sant'Andrea.

Catholic Church titles
Preceded by Michele Lega	Prefect of the Supreme Tribunal of the Apostolic Signatura; 20 March 1920 – 26 February 1926	Succeeded by Francesco Ragonesi
