= Papal majordomo =

Chief steward of the household of the pope

The papal majordomo or chief steward of the household of the pope is one of the three (formerly four) palatine prelates (prelati palatini), as discussed in the article maestro di camera.

The Papal Majordomo is also part of the four "prelati di fiocchetto", a term referring to prelates who have the right to adorn the harnesses of their horses with violet and peacock-colored feathers. The other members of the "prelati di fiocchetto" include the Governor of Rome, in his capacity as Vice-Chamberlain, the Auditor, and the Treasurer of the Apostolic Chamber.

== History ==
The 1295 Introitus et Exitus Cameræ Apostolicæ lists the officials of the Apostolic Household, and does not include an office corresponding to that of the papal majordomo.

The papal household underwent major restructuring under Clement V and John XXII. After Martin V returned from Avignon to Rome in 1418, the household offices began to evolve into their modern form, a process which continued through the Renaissance.

By the sixteenth century, the office of maestro di casa ("master of the house") was officially established. Towards the end of the century the office was renamed to prefetto del Sacro Palazzo Apostolico, and under Urban VIII (1623–44) it was again renamed to Maggiordomo Pontificio ("pontifical majordomo").

It was then his duty, on the accession of a new pope, to form the papal famiglia, that is, to suggest candidates for the various household offices and then to direct the whole household. In so far as this duty necessitated expenditure, the Treasurer of the Holy Roman Church, the minister of finance for the time being, exercised sharply defined control over the majordomo and his assistants. This circumstance did not, however, constitute the treasurer a household official, or the Præfectus Sacri Palatii and administrative official; the Majordomo has always been exclusively a household official. A complete list of the occupants of the office from 1534 is preserved. The general rule recognised by the Roman Curia at the close of the Middle Ages, that the head of any important, department should have jurisdiction over all his assistants, extended to the Majordomo. Not merely in civil matters but likewise in criminal charges, sedebat pro tribunali—he pronounced judgment on all officials of the papal palace. In the course of time his duties as majordomo were sharply distinguished from those he performed as Prefect of the Palace, so that the majordomo was said to be simultaneously Prefect of the Palace. To the prefecture belonged the management of the museums and of all establishments of a special kind existing in the palaces—provided they were not autonomous. The keeping of the palace accounts also fell to the prefect.

After 1870, following the loss of the Papal states to reunited Italy, there was a great change in these conditions. The important office of the prefect was separated from that of the majordomo, and entrusted to the commission of cardinals appointed to administer the business affairs of the Holy See. The arrangement of Leo XIII was so far altered by Pius X, that the Cardinal Secretary of State was made Prefect of the Apostolic Palaces. Subordinate to him were the subprefect, the forriere maggiore, the cavallerizzo maggiore, the segreteria della prefettiora, the computisteria, the architetto and the juristic counsellors, forming in their corporate capacity, the divisional boards of direction of the palace administration. The museums and galleries were also entrusted to this body.

The above-mentioned alteration by Leo XIII took place on 29 December 1891, after the prefecture had been separated by a motu proprio issued 7 December 1891. The rights of the Majordomo became as follows: He retained his old privilege of accompanying the Pope, and remained Governor of the Conclave. In this capacity he has the general control of the personnel of the palaces, and responsibility for the quiet and good order therein during the Conclave. In the Congresso Palatino (Palatine Commission), should it be hereafter convened, he got a seat and a vote. He conducted the Congregation of the Apostolic Hospice and was director of the Sistine Chapel Choir, the musical direction of which was in 1910 entrusted to Maestro Perosi. All ordinary and extraordinary religious functions in which the pope and papal court participate came under his arrangement and direction. The appointments of papal chamberlains were forwarded by him at the pope's order, and he distributed the annual medals to the members of the papal household. His earlier duty of issuing cards of admission to the galleries and museums for purposes of study and copying was withdrawn from him. The Majordomo as the chief Prelate of the Household has a distinctive dress and a free official residence in the papal palace.
