= 1922 conclave =

Election of Catholic Pope Pius XI

Papal conclave February 1922

Dates and location
- 2–6 February 1922; Sistine Chapel, Apostolic Palace, Kingdom of Italy

Key officials
- Dean: Vincenzo Vannutelli
- Sub-dean: Gaetano de Lai
- Camerlengo: Pietro Gasparri
- Protopriest: Michael Logue
- Protodeacon: Gaetano Bisleti
- Secretary: Luigi Sincero

Election
- Electors: 53 (list)
- Candidates: Rafael Merry del Val
- Ballots: 14

Elected pope
- Achille Ratti; Name taken: Pius XI
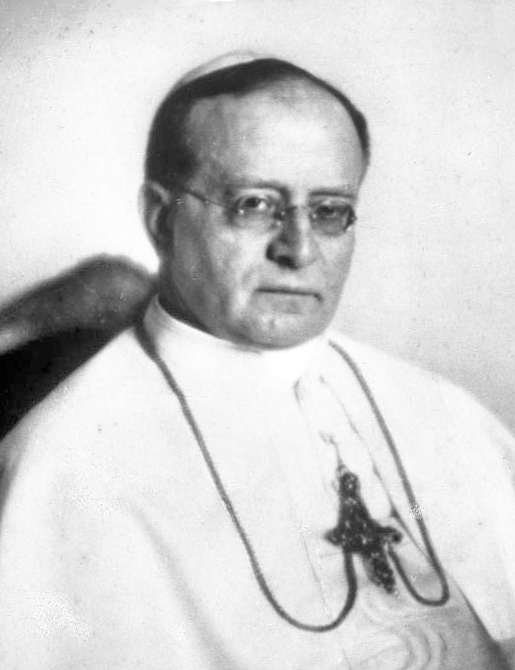

A conclave was held from 2 to 6 February 1922 to elect a new pope to succeed Benedict XV, who had died on 22 January. Of the 60 members of the College of Cardinals, all but seven attended. (Note: The current 80-year-old age limit for cardinal electors was introduced by Pope Paul VI in 1970.) On the fourteenth ballot, the conclave elected Cardinal Achille Ratti, the archbishop of Milan. After accepting his election, he took the name Pius XI. During his first appearance on the main loggia of St. Peter's Basilica, he gave the traditional Urbi et Orbi ("to the city and to the world") blessing to the people in St. Peter's Square, which his predecessors had abstained from since the capture of Rome by Italy in 1870.

Four non-European cardinals did not participate in the conclave. Three of them arrived too late, and one did not attempt the journey. Three weeks after his election, Pius XI issued rules extending the time between the death of a pope and the start of the conclave in order to increase the likelihood that cardinals from distant locations could participate in the next conclave.

== Background ==
The previous five conclaves had produced a seesawing between conservatives and liberals, from the conservative Gregory XVI in 1831 to the initially liberal Pius IX. Pius IX had become a religious and political conservative by the time of his death in 1878, and he was succeeded by the more liberal Leo XIII, who on his death was succeeded by the theologically conservative Pius X, who strongly condemned modernism. In 1914, the more liberal Benedict XV was elected.

At the death of Benedict XV, there were 61 members of the College of Cardinals. Enrique Almaraz, the archbishop of Toledo, died the same day. Three of the remaining 60 cardinals did not attend the conclave for reasons of health: José Martín de Herrera, Giuseppe Prisco, and Lev Skrbenský z Hříště. Rio de Janeiro's Joaquim Cavalcanti knew he could not reach Rome in time for the conclave and did not attempt the journey. The other three non-European cardinals (William Henry O'Connell of Boston, Dennis Joseph Dougherty of Philadelphia, and Louis-Nazaire Bégin of Québec City) did not arrive in time to participate in the conclave. (Note: Cardinal O'Connell arrived at the Vatican on 6 February "at the moment the new Pope was blessing the multitude." His departure had been delayed a day when he had difficulty booking his passage. One observer, unidentified by the historian who provides his view, thought O'Connell "intentionally selected slow transport" to underscore both the need for more time and the importance of the U.S. to the Church. Cardinals Dougherty and Bégin learned the outcome of the conclave at sea aboard the S.S. Lorraine and hoped to arrive in Rome in time for the coronation. Both said when leaving New York that they did not expect to arrive in time. The Chicago Tribune offered Dougherty an airplane for traveling from Le Havre to Rome, which he declined citing the "uncertainties of flying, as well as the strain of being in the air twenty-four hours". They arrived on 9 February.)

Two-thirds of the non-Italian cardinals and some of the Italians wanted to delay the start of the conclave until at least one of the Americans arrived. Cardinal János Csernoch of Hungary told the other cardinals that "America is a vital part of the Church. It will be calamitous to deny her participation in the election of the pontiff. It will have a grave reaction among the American people; it will wound their pride and dignity." Cardinal Friedrich Gustav Piffl opposed proceeding without the Americans "for the sake of a technicality". The 53 cardinals who entered the conclave on 2 February, the eleventh day following the death of Benedict XV as required, were 31 Italians, five French, four Spanish, three German, three British, two Polish, two Austrian, one Hungarian, one Belgian, and one Dutch.

During his time as apostolic delegate to the United States, Archbishop Giovanni Bonzano sent $210,400.09 to the Holy See to ensure the conclave could occur.

== Balloting ==
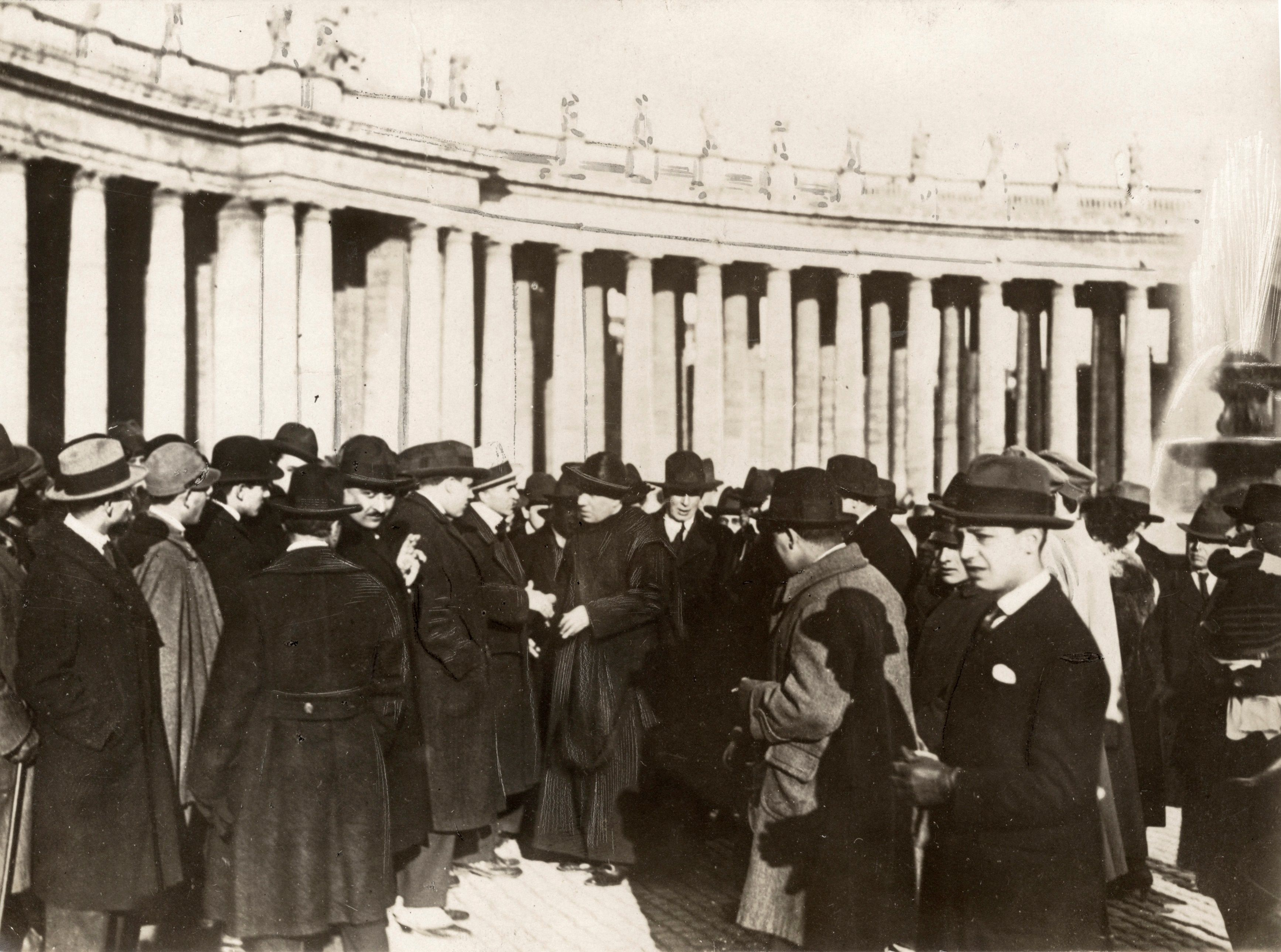
Crowd in front of the St. Peter's Basilica waiting for the results of the conclave

The 1922 conclave was the most divided conclave in many years. While two of the previous three conclaves had lasted three days or less, the 1922 conclave lasted for five days. It took fourteen ballots for Achille Ratti, the archbishop of Milan, to reach the two-thirds majority needed for election. He had been made a cardinal and appointed archbishop of Milan just eight months earlier after a long academic career and less than three years in the diplomatic service of the Holy See.

At the conclave, the College of Cardinals was divided into two factions. One conservative faction favoring the policies and style of Pius X, known as the "irreconcilables" or "integrationists", was led by Secretary of the Holy Office Cardinal Rafael Merry del Val. (Note: Cardinal Merry del Val had served as secretary of state under Pius X) The other more conciliatory faction favoring the policies and style of Benedict XV was led by Cardinal Camerlengo Pietro Gasparri, who had served as Benedict's secretary of state.

No ballots were taken on the first day. Four ballots were taken on each of the succeeding days, two in the morning and two in the afternoon. Gasparri approached Ratti before voting began on the third day and told him he would urge his supporters to switch their votes to Ratti, who was shocked to hear this. When it became clear that neither Gasparri nor del Val could win, the cardinals approached Ratti, thinking him a compromise candidate not identified with either faction. Cardinal Gaetano de Lai approached Ratti and was believed to have said: "We will vote for Your Eminence if Your Eminence will promise that you will not choose Cardinal Gasparri as your secretary of state." Ratti is said to have responded: "I hope and pray that among so highly deserving cardinals the Holy Spirit selects someone else. If I am chosen, it is indeed Cardinal Gasparri whom I will take to be my secretary of state." As anticipated, Gasparri's recognition that he could not be elected and his consequent support of Ratti allowed him to remain secretary of state until he retired in 1930.

Ratti was elected pope on the conclave's fourteenth ballot on 6 February reportedly receiving 38 votes. Cardinal Dean Vincenzo Vannutelli, Cardinal Protopriest Michael Logue, and Protodeacon Gaetano Bisleti approached Ratti, and Cardinal Vannutelli asked if he accepted his election. Ratti replied: "It is God's will." When pressed for a more explicit answer, he replied "As it is God's will, it cannot be refused. Since it is the will of God I must obey." Vannutelli asked the new pope by what name he would be called. Ratti chose Pius XI, explaining that Pius IX was the pope of his youth, and Pius X had appointed him head of the Vatican Library. According to The New York Times, Ratti also told the cardinals he chose the name Pius because "he wanted a Pius to end the Roman question which had begun under a Pius".

Shortly afterwards, white smoke rose from the Sistine Chapel chimney, and Cardinal Protodeacon Gaetano Bisleti appeared on the central balcony of St. Peter's Basilica at around 12:30 p.m. to announce the election of Ratti as Pope Pius XI.

== Blessing ==
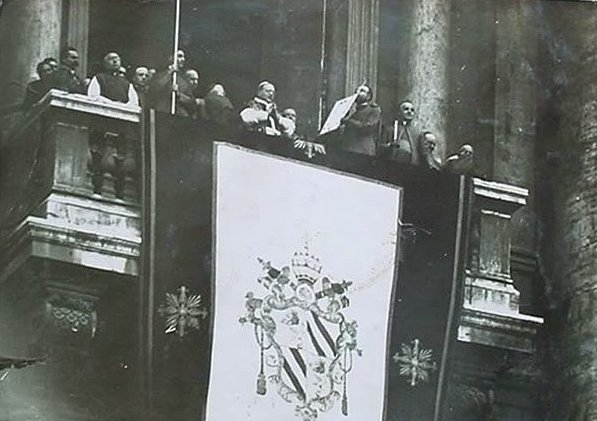
Pope Pius XI made his first public appearance in 1922. The coat of arms on the banner was that of Pius IX.

As his first act as pope, Pius XI revived the traditional public blessing from the balcony, Urbi et Orbi, ("to the city and to the world"), abandoned by his predecessors since the loss of Rome to the Italian state in 1870. (Note: Since 1870 until Pius XI's election every pope had opted to give the Urbi et Orbi blessing from an internal balcony inside St. Peter's Basilica to the congregants within rather than on the central external balcony facing outdoors to the crowds on St. Peter's Square.) This suggested his openness to a rapprochement with the government of Italy. He had earlier given indication of this to the cardinals at the conclave when he explained his choice of name ("a Pius to end the Roman question which had begun under a Pius") and his informing them that he would give the blessing in public from the central balcony. When some of the more conservative cardinals tried to persuade him not to give the blessing from the external balcony, he listened to their arguments for a while and overruled their objections by saying: "Remember, I am no longer a Cardinal. I am the Supreme Pontiff now." Also, at Pius XI's first appearance, the banner draped on the balcony displayed the arms of Pius IX—the pope who lost Rome to Italy—rather than the arms of his immediate predecessor, Benedict XV.

Shortly after the blessing was imparted, Prince Ludovico Chigi Albani della Rovere, the marshal of the conclave, issued a statement by order of the secretary of the conclave:

His Holiness, Pope Pius XI, while making every reservation in favor of the inviolable rights of the Church and of the Holy See, which rights he has sworn to defend, has given his first blessing from the exterior balcony overlooking the Square of St. Peter's in the special intention that his blessing should be addressed not only to those present in the square, and not only to those in Rome and Italy, but to all nations and all peoples and should bring to the whole world the wish and announcement of that universal pacification we all so ardently desire.

It was rumoured that immediately after the election, he decided to appoint Pietro Gasparri as his cardinal secretary of state. The contemporary report by The New York Times on the following day 7 February appears to confirm this as it reported that Gasparri, who had served as Benedict XV's secretary of state, was reappointed by the new pope and the reappointment was announced almost immediately after the new pope assumed his pontificate. The Pope also received the diplomatic corps and the Papal aristocracy in an audience later in the afternoon.

Pius XI was crowned on 12 February. Unlike his immediate predecessor, who had his coronation in the Sistine Chapel, Pius's coronation took place in the dais in front of the high altar in Saint Peter's Basilica.

== New regulations ==
Immediately following the conclave, the fact that the cardinals had disputed delaying the conclave to await the arrival of the American cardinals was openly discussed. On 8 February, four French cardinals, Louis Luçon of Rheims, Louis-Ernest Dubois of Paris, Pierre Andrieu of Bordeaux, and Louis-Joseph Maurin of Lyon, asked for changes to church law to allow for an indefinite delay to ensure participation by cardinals for North and South America. Cardinal Pietro Gasparri, who had led the Italians in opposition to a delay, expressed support for some modification of the schedule.

On 28 February, Pope Pius XI met with Cardinal O'Connell and said: "There will be no more racing 5,000 miles in a vain endeavor to reach Rome in time for a conclave. The United States is too important to be ignored as she has been. I shall see to it that what happened at the last conclave shall not occur again."

Pius XI issued new regulations in Cum proxime on 1 March 1922. He noted the experience of the conclave that elected him and that cardinals had requested modifications. He set the start of the conclave at ten to fifteen days from the death of the pope and allowed the cardinals to extend that to as long as eighteen days. It had taken the American cardinals from fifteen (6 February) to eighteen days (9 February) to arrive in Rome.

For the 1939 conclave, the college waited the maximum eighteen days.

== See also ==
Cardinal electors by region
Region	Number
Italy	30
Rest of Europe	23
North America	0
South America	0
Asia	0
Oceania	0
Africa	0
Total	53

- Cardinal electors for the 1922 conclave
