= List of motu proprios =

This is a sortable, incomplete, list of motu proprios by pontifical authors.

Motu Propio	Pope	Year	Content / phrase
Ad beatissimi Apostolorum	Benedict XV	1914	First world war
Ad purpuratorum patrum collegium	Pope Paul VI	1965	Patriarchate.
Ad tuendam fidem	John Paul II	1998	Oriental and Latin codes of canon law
Ai nostri tempi	Francis	2013	On criminal matters / Ai nostri tempi il bene comune è sempre più minacciato dalla criminalità transnazionale e organizzata
Aperuit illis	Francis	2019	Establishing the Sunday of the Word of God
Bibliorum Scientiam			
Bonum sane	Benedict XV	1920	Practices of honoring St. Joseph during the month of March
Cleri sanctitati	Pius XII	1957	
Come Una Madre Amorevole	Francis	2016	Apostolic Letter Issued Motu Proprio on (2016-06-04)
Crux Pectoralis	Pius X	1905	Crux pectoralis, quamvis sit particulare signum episcopalis dignitatis
Cum proxime	Pius XI	1922	Periode of Interregnum changes on behalf of American Cardinals
De concordia inter codices	Francis	2016	Changes in canon laws of the Roman Catholic Church
Dolentium Hominum	John Paul II	1985	Pastoral care for the sick and erection of the Pontifical Council for the Pastoral Care of Health Care Workers.
Ecclesia Dei	John Paul II	1988	
Ecclesiae Sanctae	Paul VI	1966	Promulgation of and norms for implementation of several Decrees of Vatican Council II, including Christus Dominus, Presbyterorum Ordinis, Perfectae Caritatis, Ad Gentes Divinitus
Fides per Doctrinam	Benedict XVI	2013	Fides per doctrinam sustineatur oportet, quae credentium mentem corque illuminare valeat: whereby the Apostolic Constitution “Pastor Bonus” is modified and competence for catechesis is transferred from the Congregation for the Clergy to the Pontifical Council for Promoting the New Evangelization
Fidelis Dispensator Et Prudens	Francis	2014	Established a new coordinating agency for economic and administrative affairs of the Holy See and the Vatican City State.
Humanam Progressionem	Francis	2016	Instituted the Dicastery for promoting Integral Human Development
Humani Generis Redemptionem	Benedict XV	1917	Christian preachers and an ever-decreasing effect of their preaching
I Beni Temporali	Francis	2016	I beni temporali che la Chiesa possiede sono destinati a conseguire i suoi fini e cioè il culto divino / Regarding certain competencies in economic-financial matters
In Cotidianis Precibus	Pius XII	1945	
In Fructibus Multis	Paul VI	1964	
In hac Beatissimi Petri	Pius X	1910	In hac Beatissimi Petri Cathedra ad procurandum Catholicae Ecclesiae
Ingravescentem aetatem	Paul VI	1970	On Voting Cardinals in the Conclave / Ingravescentem aetatem inter et aptitudinem ad quaedam maioris momenti officia
Integrae Servandae	Paul VI	1965	
In Praeclara Summorum	Benedict XV	1921	Sixth centenary of the death of Dante
In Romanae Curiae	Pius X	1910	In Romanae Curiae ordinatione, per Constitutionem Sapienti Consilio decreta...
Intima ecclesiae natura	Benedict XVI	2012	Apostolic Letter issued Motu Proprio on the Service of Charity, opening words in English: The Church's deepest nature ...
Le più colte	Pius VII	1801	Trade liberalization
Magnum principium	Francis	2017	Apostolic Letter Issued Motu Proprio on the authority and process of translating liturgical texts
Maiorem hac Dilectionem	Francis	2017	Apostolic Letter Issued Motu Proprio on the Oblatio Vitae ("offer of life"), 11 July 2017
Maximum illud	Benedict XV	1919	
Ministeria Quaedam	Paul VI	1972	On first tonsure, minor orders and the subdiaconate (15 August 1972)
Ministrorum Institutio	Benedict XVI	2013	Ministrorum institutio sacrorum inter praecipuas Concilii Oecumenici Vaticani II / whereby the Apostolic Constitution Pastor Bonus is modified and responsibility for seminaries is transferred from the Congregation for Catholic Education to the Congregation for the Clergy
Mitis Iudex Dominus Iesus	Francis	2015	Reform to the Canons of the Code of Canon that pertain to the marriage nullity cases.
Mitis et Misericors Iesus	Francis	2015	Reform of the canons of the Code of Canons of Eastern Churches pertaining to cases regarding the nullity of marriage
Mysterii Paschalis	Paul VI	1969	Reorganisation of the liturgical year
Nobilissimam Sacrarum	Benedict XV	1917	
Omnium in Mentem	Benedict XVI	2009	
Normas Nonnullas	Benedict XVI	2013	Normas nonnullas per Apostolicas Litteras / on certain modifications to the norms governing the election of the Roman Pontiff
Organi Giudiziari	Francis	2013	Apostolic Letter Issued Motu Proprio On the Jurisdiction of Judicial Authorities of Vatican City State in Criminal Matters (11 July 2013)
Pontificalis Domus	Paul VI	1968	
Prevenzione Contrasto	Francis	2013	Apostolic Letter Issued Motu Proprio for the Prevention and Countering of Money Laundering, the Financing of Terrorism, and the Proliferation of Weapons of Mass Destruction
Quando per ammirabile disposizione	Pius VII	1816	Fiscal and criminal justice reform, abolition of torture
Religiosorum Ordinum	Pius X	1906	Religiosorum Ordinum familias, utpote quae praeclaro semper et adiumento
Rubricarum Instructum	John XXIII	1960	Revision of the Breviary
Quartus Iam Annus	Benedict XV	1918	
Quod Iam Diu	Benedict XV	1918	
Sacramentorum Sanctitatis Tutela	John Paul II	2001	Promulgation of Norms on more grave delicts reserved to the Congregation for the Doctrine of Faith
Sacrorum antistitum	Pius X	1910	Oath Against Modernism
Sanctuarium In Ecclesia	Francis	2017	Apostolic Letter Issued Motu Proprio on (2017-02-11)
Sedula Mater	Francis	2016	Apostolic Letter Issued Motu Proprio on (2016-08-15)
Segreteria Comunicazione	Francis	2015	Apostolic Letter Issued Motu Proprio on (2015-06-27)
Statuti Segreteria Per Economia	Francis	2015	Apostolic Letter Issued Motu Proprio on (2015-02-22)
Statuto Aif	Francis	2013	Apostolic Letter Issued Motu Proprio on (2013-11-15)
Statuto Accademia Vita	Francis	2016	Apostolic Letter Issued Motu Proprio on (2016-10-18)
Statuto Dicastero Famiglia Laici Vita	Francis	2016	Apostolic Letter Issued Motu Proprio on (2016-06-04)
Statuto Dicastero Servizio Sviluppo Umano Integrale	Francis	2016	Apostolic Letter Issued Motu Proprio on (2016-08-17)
Statuto Segreteria Comunicazione	Francis	2016	Apostolic Letter Issued Motu Proprio on (2016-09-06)
Summorum Pontificum	Benedict XVI	2007	About the Roman Liturgy before the reform of 1970.
Summo Sane	Pius X	1905	Summo sane afficimur gaudio quod in Patriarchali Seminario Venetiarum Iuris canonici Schola
Supremum Officium	Pius X	1912	
Supremi Disciplinae			
Trasferimento Apsa	Francis	2014	Transferral of the Ordinary Section of the Administration of the Patrimony of the Apostolic See to the Secretariat for the Economy (8 July 2014)
Tra le Sollecitudini	Pius X	1903	Regulations for the performance of music in the Roman Catholic Church
Traditionis custodes	Francis	2021	Restricting celebration of the Tridentine Mass (16 July 2021)
Vos estis lux mundi	Francis	2019	Establishes new procedures to report abuse by clergy
