= Humani =

Humani may refer to:

== Law ==
- Hostis humani generis, a legal term of art that originates in admiralty law

== Organizations ==
- Humani (organisation) or the Humanist Association of Northern Ireland, a humanist organisation based in Northern Ireland

== Religion ==
- Humani generis, a papal encyclical that Pope Pius XII promulgated on 12 August 1950
- Humani generis redemptionem, an encyclical by Pope Benedict XV on Rome 15 June 1917
- Humani generis unitas, a planned encyclical of Pope Pius XI before his death on February 10, 1939

== Science ==
- De Incendiis Corporis Humani Spontaneis, a book published by French author Jonas Dupont
- De humani corporis fabrica, a textbook of human anatomy written by Andreas Vesalius (1514–1564)

== See also ==
- Humani generis (disambiguation)
