= Bonum =

Bonum may refer to:

- Bonum sane was a motu proprio on Saint-Joseph written by Pope Benedict XV and delivered on July 25, 1920.
- Summum bonum is an expression used in philosophy.
- De mortuis nil nisi bonum is a Latin phrase that indicates that it is socially inappropriate to say anything negative about a deceased person.
