= Aperuit illis =

2019 Apostolic Letter by Pope Francis

Aperuit illis Latin for 'He opened their' Apostolic letter of Pope Francis
- Signature date: 30 September 2019
- Text: In English

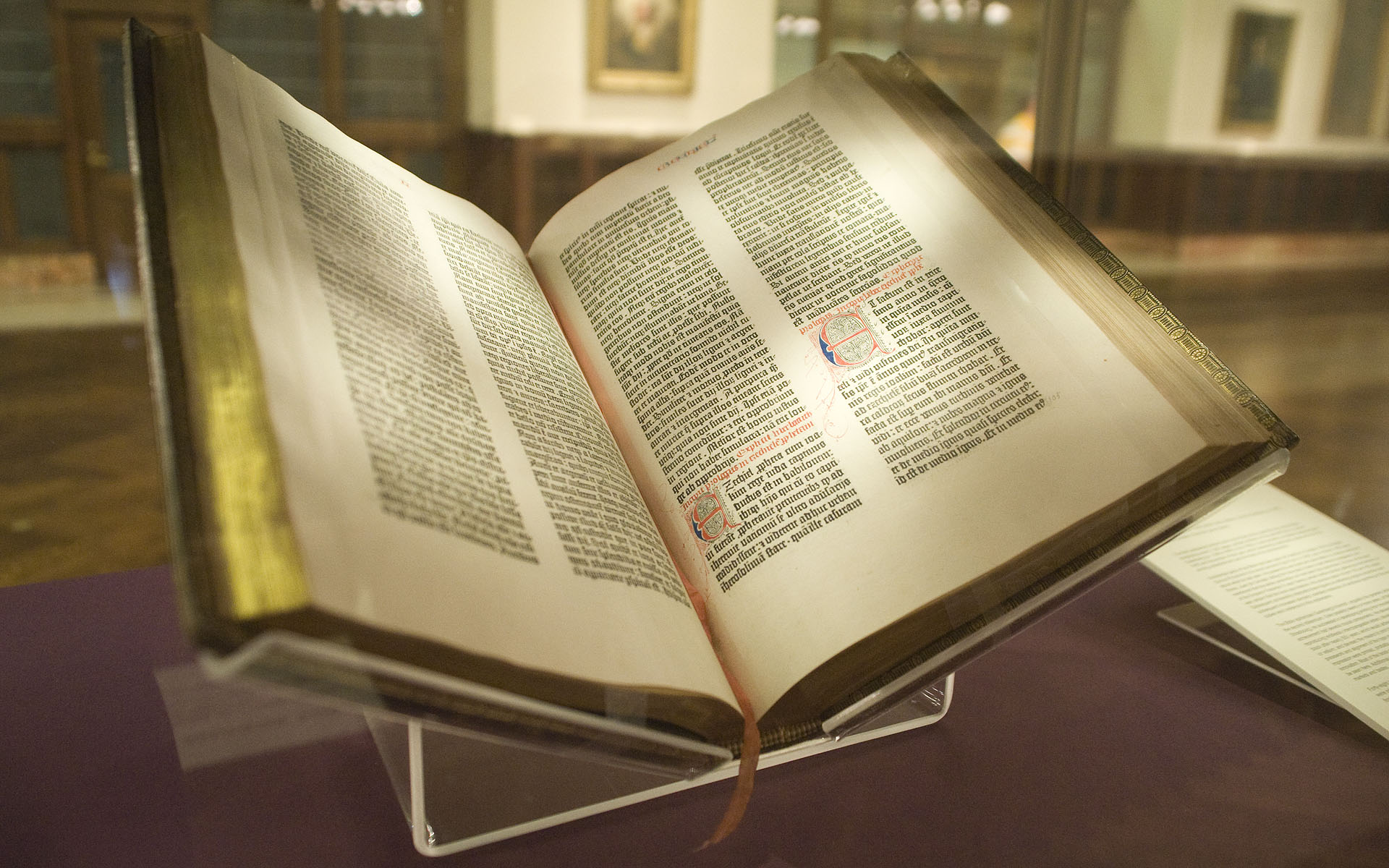
Gutenberg Bible

Aperuit illis is an apostolic letter, by Pope Francis, issued "motu proprio" on September 30, 2019, the feast of Saint Jerome, instituting the annual observance of the Third Sunday of Ordinary Time as "Sunday of the Word of God", devoted to the celebration, study and dissemination of the Word of God. The first "Sunday of the Word of God" occurred on January 26, 2020. The Pope said that he wrote the Apostolic Letter in response to requests from around the world to celebrate the Sunday of the Word of God.

== Background ==
On November 24, 2013, Pope Francis issued the apostolic exhortation Evangelii gaudium. A significant portion of Chapter Three, "The Proclamation of the Gospel", is devoted to the prayerful preparation of the homily. He recommends homilists practice lectio divina. "It consists of reading God’s word in a moment of prayer and allowing it to enlighten and renew us. This prayerful reading of the Bible is not something separate from the study undertaken by the preacher to ascertain the central message of the text; on the contrary, it should begin with that study and then go on to discern how that same message speaks to his own life."

During a homily at Mass on 13 March 2015, Pope Francis declared a Jubilee for 2016. This was followed on April 11, 2015 with the bull of indiction Misericordiae vultus proclaiming an Extraordinary Jubilee of Mercy from December 8, 2015, the Feast of the Immaculate Conception, to November 20, 2016, the Feast of Christ the King. At the conclusion of the Jubilee Year, he issued the Apostolic Letter Misericordia et misera, in which he said, "I greatly desire that God’s word be increasingly celebrated, known and disseminated, so that the mystery of love streaming from this font of mercy may be ever better understood. As the Apostle tells us clearly: “All Scripture is inspired by God and profitable for teaching, for reproof, for correction, and for training in righteousness” (2 Tim 3:16)."

== Content ==
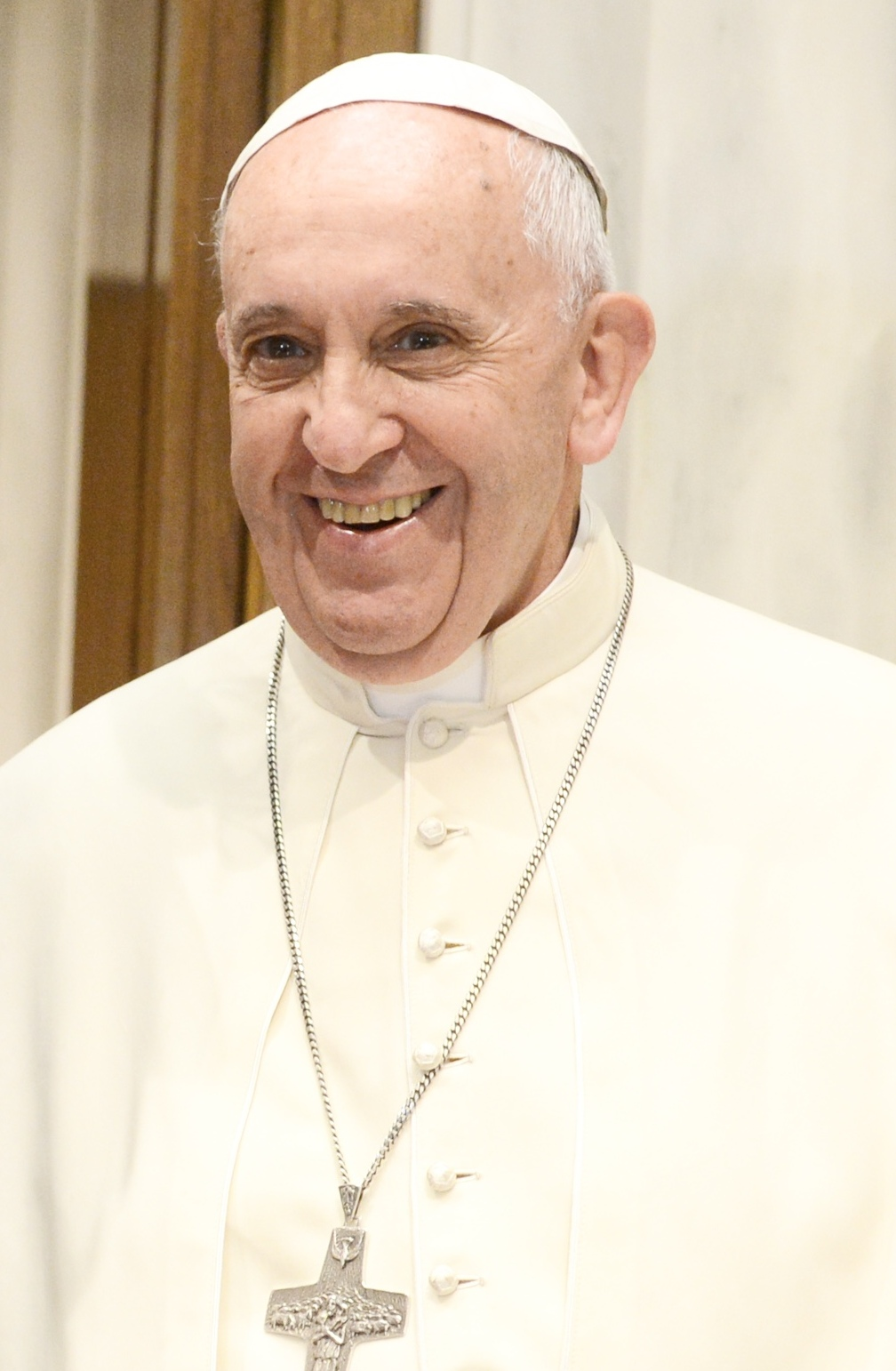
Pope Francis (2015)

The January timing of the observance means that it will often occur in some places near the Week of Prayer for Christian Unity and commemorations for Holocaust Memorial Day. "This Sunday of the Word of God will thus be a fitting part of that time of the year when we are encouraged to strengthen our bonds with the Jewish people and to pray for Christian unity. This is more than a temporal coincidence: the celebration of the Sunday of the Word of God has ecumenical value, since the Scriptures point out, for those who listen, the path to authentic and firm unity."

The title, “Aperuit illis”, is taken from Luke 24:45, where the Evangelist describes how the Risen Jesus appeared to two disciples on the road to Emmaus, and “He opened their minds to understand the Scriptures”.

Pope Francis cited the dogmatic constitution Dei verbum and its discussion of the importance of Scripture for the life of the Church (Chapter VI). He also referenced Pope Benedict XVI's 2008 apostolic exhortation, Verbum Domini, which emphasized "in particular the performative character of the Word of God, especially in the context of the liturgy, in which its distinctively sacramental character comes to the fore". While scripture readings are an integral part of every Sunday liturgy, he suggested that this particular Sunday would be appropriate for the formal Installation of Lectors to point out "the importance of the proclamation of God’s word in the liturgy". He also recommended pastors consider instructing their congregations in the practice of lectio divina.

Francis again discusses the preaching of the homily, as he did earlier in Evangelii gaudium, and views it as being a pastoral opportunity with "a quasi-sacramental character". "Those of us who are preachers should not give long, pedantic homilies or wander off into unrelated topics."

== Responses ==
The United States Conference of Catholic Bishops issued a statement saying that they welcomed the motu proprio, "The Holy Father reminds us that the Word of God is ‘performative’ and that Christians should linger over and study the Word of God as revealed in Sacred Scripture."

The Irish Catholic Bishops' Conference pointed out that "Word of God Sunday" is not a new feast day, but "a day to be devoted to the celebration, study, and spreading of the Word of God." The bishops noted that "[t]he reform of the lectionary has led to much more scripture being proclaimed during our liturgical gatherings and a greater awareness of the role of the Word of God in the life of faith." The Irish Association of Catholic Priests had made available a downloadable pamphlet first produced in a parish about 20 years ago by Pádraig McCarthy to encourage people to read Scripture. McCarthy updated the leaflet with some introductory notes, and a list of the Sunday readings for the current year.

The Pope’s motu proprio coincides with the Bishops of England and Wales announcement of a "Year of the Word — The God who Speaks" to commence on the First Sunday of Advent 2019. The bishops noted that the proclamation was issued on the Feast of St. Jerome, known for his translation of scripture and his commentaries on the Gospels.

Holy Cross Father Adam Booth compared the decision by Pope Francis to establish "Word of God Sunday" to Pope John Paul II’s institution of the Luminous Mysteries in 2002.

== See also ==
- Lectio Divina
