= Maiorem hac dilectionem =

Apostolic letter

Maiorem hac dilectionem (Latin for 'Greater love than this') is an apostolic letter issued in the form of a motu proprio of Pope Francis, dated 11 July 2017. The document creates a new path towards sainthood under the canonization procedures of the Catholic Church, through the path of oblatio vitae. This means the offering of one's life and premature death for another individual; it is to give one's life as a sacrifice for another.

== Contents ==
Francis first states that there is no greater love than for one to sacrifice his own life for his friends and neighbors while drawing from a particular passage from John 15:13. He mentions that such an act warrants consideration for the causes of saints since the individual is held as one who has exercised the Christian virtues to an apt degree but do not fit into the established categories of practicing Christian virtues to a heroic degree and the deliberate shedding of blood for Jesus Christ.

The Pope therefore establishes five guidelines that must be established for an "oblatio vitae" (the offer of life) path to beatification. The criteria are:

- a free and voluntary offer of life and heroic acceptance proper caritatem of a certain and untimely death;
- a nexus between the offer of life and premature death;
- the exercise, at least as ordinarily possible, of Christian virtues before the offer of life and, then, unto death;
- the existence of a reputation of holiness and of signs, at least after death;
- the necessity of a miracle for beatification, occurring after the death of the Servant of God and through his or her intercession.

The criteria are still to abide by the Apostolic Constitution of Divinus perfectionis Magister that Pope John Paul II issued in 1983 and by another document issued around that time.

== Origins ==
The question as to whether a fourth path to sainthood could be established arose in discussions amongst the members of the Congregation for the Causes of Saints at their ordinary congress held on 24 January 2014. The congregation's prefect Cardinal Angelo Amato called this matter into question with the pope during their meeting on the following 7 February. According to Marcello Bartolucci the pope "approved and encouraged" the studies into this fourth path in which a dossier was compiled for further research.

The congregation held a peculiar congress on 2 June 2016 with several experts present for further discussions including ten consulters and five postulators including the meeting's chairperson Bishop Enrico dal Covolo who was also a postulator. Five questions were put forward as to how the congregation could institute a new path for beatification and the criteria that would need to be put in place so as to enforce it. On 27 September the plenary session of the cardinal and bishop members of the congregation discussed the various dimensions to the overall issue and a favorable vote was cast for this new path to sainthood though the need for an approved miracle was highlighted as an essential feature. The conclusions of this session were sent to the pope in a letter dated on 28 November 2016.

The Cardinal Secretary of State Pietro Parolin informed Cardinal Amato on 17 January that on the previous 10 January the pope had approved the proposals for a new path for beatification while asking the congregation to draft the text for a document to make the approval formal.

== Publication ==
Marcello Bartolucci wrote a piece for L'Osservatore Romano following the document's release and outlined the fact that the pope:

"... has opened the path to beatification for those faithful who, inspired by charity, have heroically offered their life for their neighbor, free and voluntarily accepting certain and untimely death in their determination to follow Jesus ..."

Bartolucci further elaborated on the criteria and said that the three other paths to sainthood (martyrdom and heroic virtue as well as equipollent beatification) were insufficient to interpret all potential causes for saintliness in individuals while recounting that the Congregation for the Causes of Saints had discussed whether a new path would be viable.
