= List of encyclicals of Pope Benedict XV =

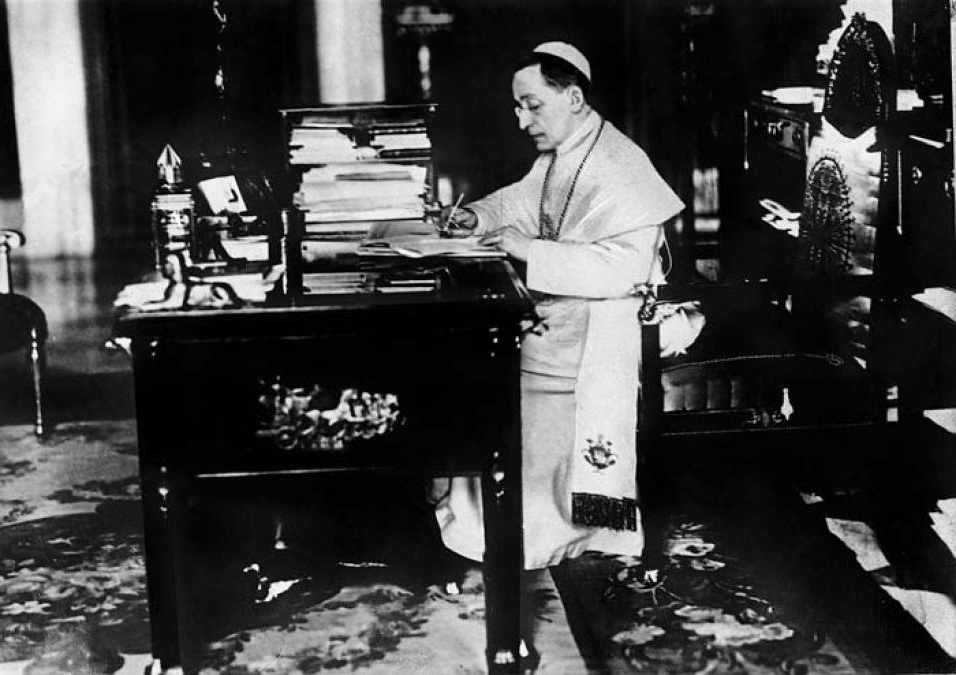
Pope Benedict XV in his private office

This article contains a list of encyclicals of Pope Benedict XV. Pope Benedict XV issued 12 papal encyclicals during his reign as Pope.

== The encyclicals of Benedict XV ==
No.	Title (Latin)	Title (English translation)	Subject	Date
1.	Ad beatissimi Apostolorum	To the Chair of the Prince of the Apostles	Appealing For Peace	1 November 1914
2.	Humani generis redemptionem	Redemption of the Human Race	On Preaching the Word of God	15 June 1917
3.	Quod iam diu	That for which	On the Future Peace Conference	1 December 1918
4.	In hac tanta	We are in the midst	On St. Boniface	14 May 1919
5.	Paterno iam diu	Of Our paternal heart	On the Children of Central Europe	24 November 1919
6.	Pacem, Dei munus pulcherrimum	Peace, the Beautiful Gift of God	On Peace and Christian Reconciliation	23 May 1920
7.	Spiritus Paraclitus	The Holy Spirit, the Paraclete	On St. Jerome	15 September 1920
8.	Principi Apostolorum Petro	To Peter, Prince of the Apostles	On St. Ephram the Syrian	5 October 1920
9.	Annus iam plenus	A whole year has passed	On Children in Central Europe	1 December 1920
10.	Sacra propediem	Solemn Festivities	On the Third Order of St. Francis	6 January 1921
11.	In praeclara summorum	Among the many celebrated geniuses	On Dante	30 April 1921
12.	Fausto appetente die	The seventh centenary of the day approaches	On St. Dominic	29 June 1921
