= In praeclara summorum =

1921 papal encyclical

In praeclara summorum Latin for 'Among the many celebrated' Encyclical of Pope Benedict XV
- Signature date: 30 April 1921
- Subject: Dante is one of the greatest literary treasures produced by the Catholic faith
- Number: 11 of 12 of the pontificate
- Text: In Latin; In English

In praeclara summorum (Among the many celebrated) is the eleventh encyclical of Pope Benedict XV, published on 30 April 1921, for the occasion of the sixth centenary of the death of Dante and is dedicated to the memory of the poet.

== Description ==
Teodolinda Barolini claims that the encyclical is part of a continuing attempt by Catholic orthodoxy to appropriate Dante and ignore Dante's heterodox opinions.

Natalia Z. Zazulina argues that "Benedict XV knew classical literature very well", and views this encyclical as an expression of his love for it. She states that "experts on Dante’s works compared the encyclical In praeclara with a full doctorate, where in addition to in-depth analysis of Dante’s religious poetry the author showed himself as a serious connoisseur of his work, history and Italian language".

It is one of a series of five encyclicals of Benedict XV, each constituting a kind of monograph on important characters in the history of the Church; along with this encyclical, the others are: Spiritus paraclitus of 1920, on St. Jerome; Principi Apostolorum Petro of 1920, on St. Ephrem the Syrian; Sacra propediem of 1921, on St. Francis of Assisi; and Fausto appetente die of 1921, on St. Dominic.

== See also ==
- List of encyclicals of Pope Benedict XV
