= Le più colte =

Le più colte Italian for 'The most cultured' Encyclical of Pope Pius VII
- Signature date: 11 March 1801
- Subject: agricultural policy, trade liberalization
- Number: 2 of the pontificate

Le più colte (literally, "the most cultured") was an apostolic letter issued by Pope Pius VII in the first year of his pontificate (1801) in the form of a motu proprio, written in Italian, which set out drastic reforms in agricultural policy within the Papal States.

== Content ==
The document ordered the complete freedom of production and trade of granaglie (corn, flour, etc. but not bread) within the borders of the Papal States with the objective of increasing the general health level of the population. On the other hand, in order to satisfy internal demand, exports remained forbidden.

Furthermore, the Deputazione dell'Annona was instituted for the first time, which aimed to supervise the whole agricultural production, abolishing some old corporate restrictions on "grascia". Together with the institution of the free trade of granaglie, it introduced the freedom to formulate prices and abolished the obligation to sell farm production to the Annona of Rome. Finally, the "università dei Fornari" was abolished.

The reforms set out in this document were more challenging in comparison to the previous motu proprio, where they had been announced for the first time. They were conceived in response to the ongoing ideological influence of the liberalism of the more advanced countries in Europe and some areas in Italy (referred to in the incipit as "Le più colte nazioni d’Europa ed alcune popolazioni d’Italia") and not just by the needs of the moment.

In a subsequent motu proprio, the number of suppressed corporations was further increased.

== Bibliography ==
- Nicola Maria Nicolai, Memorie, leggi, ed osservazioni sulle campagne e sull'annona di Roma: Osservazioni storiche economiche dai primi tempi fino al presente con appendice delle operazioni agrarie e biblioteca Georgica, Pagliarini, 1803.
