= Sunday of the Word of God =

Annual commemoration in the Catholic Church

- Observed by: Catholic Church
- Date: Third Sunday in Ordinary Time; Sunday between 21 and 27 January, inclusive
- 2025 date: 26 January
- 2026 date: 25 January
- 2027 date: 24 January
- 2028 date: 23 January
- Frequency: Annual
- First time: 26 January 2020

The Sunday of the Word of God is an annual commemoration in the Catholic Church taking place on the third Sunday in Ordinary Time, during January. Pope Francis’ associated motu proprio, Aperuit illis, was published on 30 September 2019, the feast day of Saint Jerome, an early Christian biblical translator and interpreter. It establishes that "the Third Sunday in Ordinary Time is to be devoted to the celebration, study and dissemination of the Word of God". The day first took place on 26 January 2020.

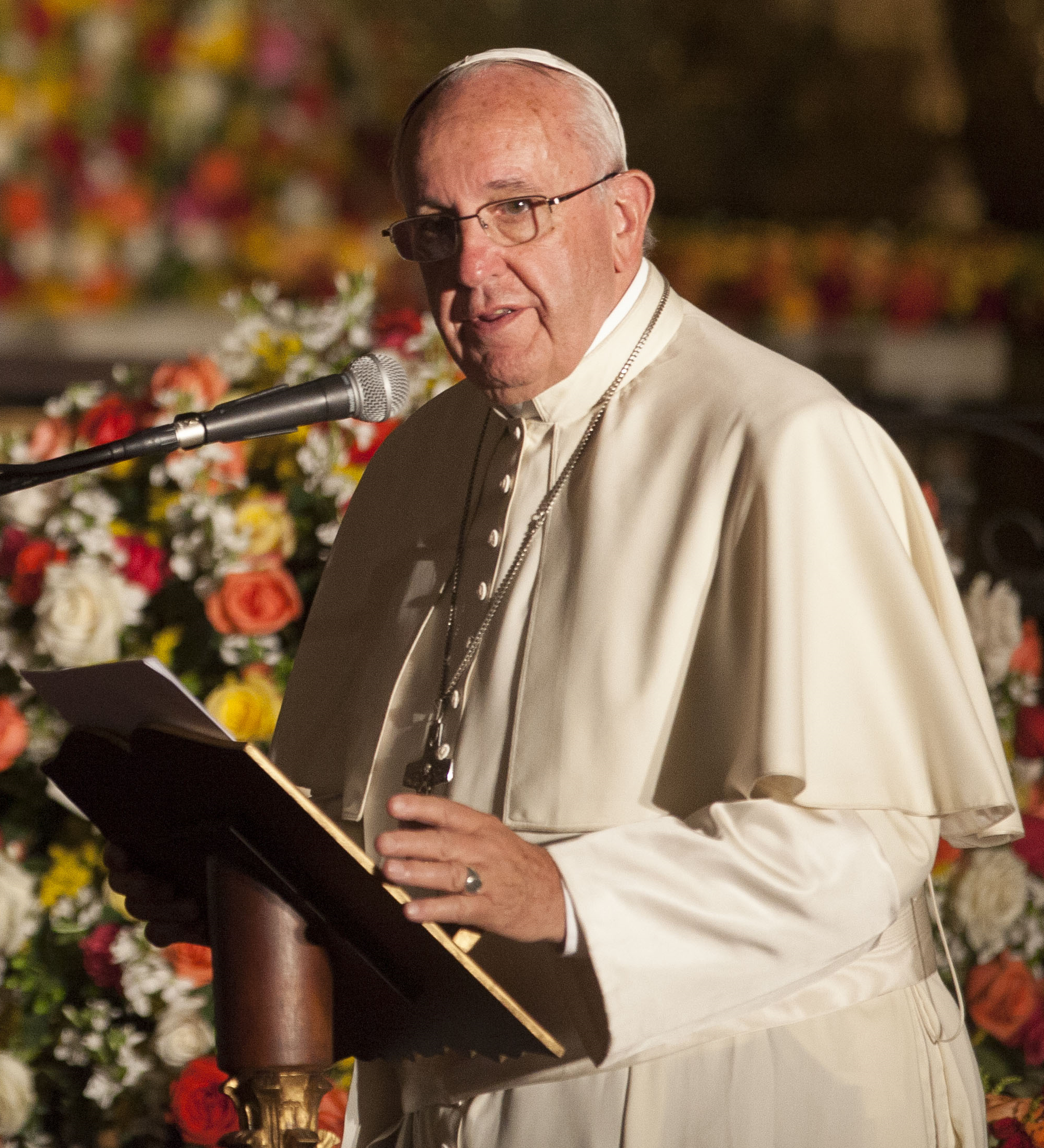
Pope Francis

The title of the papal document, Aperuit illis, is taken from Luke's Gospel, where the Evangelist describes how the Risen Jesus appeared to his disciples, and how "he opened their minds to understand the Scriptures". Francis issued this directive in consequence of his intention to set aside "a Sunday given over entirely to the word of God, so as to appreciate the inexhaustible riches contained in that constant dialogue between the Lord and his people" which he announced at the conclusion of the Extraordinary Year of Mercy, 2015–2016. Francis pays testimony in his letter to Dei verbum, the Second Vatican Council's Dogmatic Constitution on Divine Revelation. The phrase "Dei verbum" is Latin for "Word of God" and is taken from the first line of the document.

An official logo for the Sunday of the Word of God was unveiled at the Vatican on 17 January 2020, depicting "The Road to Emmaus". It is based on an icon produced by Benedictine nun Marie-Paul Farran.
