= Humani generis (disambiguation) =

Humani generis could refer to the following papal encyclicals:

- 1917 Humani generis redemptionem -- Benedict XV on preaching
- 1939 Humani generis unitas -- Pius XI on antisemitism (never promulgated)
- 1950 Humani generis -- Pius XII on theological issues and evolution
