= Gregorian Consortium =

Defunct Catholic university consortium

Holy See

The Gregorian Consortium is a collaborative association of three pontifical universities/institutes in Rome. In 1930 the motu proprio Quod maxime of Pope Pius XI associated the Pontifical Gregorian University (Greg), the Pontifical Biblical Institute (Biblicum), and the Pontifical Oriental Institute (Orientale) into a university consortium. All three institutions belong to the Holy See and are entrusted to the Society of Jesus. The Consortium ceased to exist on May 19, 2024, following the full integration of the Pontifical Biblical Institute and the Pontifical Oriental Institute into the Pontifical Gregorian University.

The Gregorian has departments of philosophy and theology, offering degrees at the bachelor, licentiate, and doctorate levels. Its international faculty serves around 3800 students from over 150 countries. Among its notable alumni are seventeen popes, including eight of the last eleven.

The "Biblicum" offers degrees only at the licentiate (SSL) and doctorate (SSD) levels. Courses deal with the Bible and its ancillary studies.

The "Orientale" offers a host of services to those researching Eastern Christianity. Approximately two-thirds of its students are enrolled in the Faculty of Eastern Church Studies, with its departments of theology and patristics, liturgy, and history. Degrees offered are only at the graduate level, the licentiate (SEOL) and doctorate (SEOD). About a third of the students pursue a degree in Eastern Canon Law where, again, only graduate degrees are offered, the licentiate (ICOL) and doctorate (ICOD).
