= Oblatio vitae =

Category under which a person may be declared Blessed in Catholic canonization

Oblatio vitae, meaning "the free offering (i.e. “oblation”) of [one's] life", is a category under which a person may be declared "Blessed" under the canonization procedures of the Catholic church.

The category was created by Pope Francis in his apostolic letter, Maiorem hac dilectionem (Greater love than this), issued on 11 July 2017.

== Text of Apostolic Letter ==
Currently available in English.
