= Jonas Dupont =

Jonas Dupont was a French physician who became famous for the publishing of the book De Incendiis Corporis Humani Spontaneis. Dupont became interested in spontaneous human combustion (SHC) after coming across the Nicole Millet case. This case occurred in 1725, where Nicole Millet's husband was accused of burning her to death, but was acquitted after a surgeon named Nicholas le Cat convinced the court that her cause of death had been SHC. Nicole Millet had supposedly been found burnt to death in an unburnt chair.

== De Incendiis Corporis Humani Spontaneis ==
De Incendiis Corporis Humani Spontaneis is a book published by Dupont. It contains a collection of cases and studies on spontaneous human combustion. This book was published in 1763 and is considered to be the first reliable evidence of SHC. Jonas Dupont's book brought SHC from being just a dark folkloric rumor into light of popular public imagination. His book made SHC a thing of popular interest and sparked people's imaginations around the world, including that of Charles Dickens, who used SHC in Bleak House to kill off a character.
