= Quod iam diu =

1918 encyclical by Benedict XV

Quod iam diu Latin for 'That which has long been' Encyclical of Pope Benedict XV
- Signature date: 1 December 1918
- Subject: On the future peace conference
- Number: 3 of 12 of the pontificate
- Text: In Latin; In English

Quod iam diu was an encyclical of Pope Benedict XV, given at Rome at St. Peter's on December 1, 1918, the fifth year of his Pontificate. It requests all Catholics everywhere in the world, no matter which side they were on, to pray for a lasting peace and for those who are entrusted to make it during the peace negotiations.

The Pope notes that true peace has not yet arrived but the Armistice has suspended the slaughter and devastation by land, sea and air. It is now the obligation of all Catholics on all sides to invoke Divine assistance for all who take part in the peace conference. The delegates who are to meet to define peace need all the support they can get for their search of a lasting peace.

- Soon the delegates of the various nations will meet in solemn congress to give the world a just and lasting peace; no human assembly has ever had before it such serious and complex determinations as they will have to take. Words, then, are not required to show how great need they have of being illuminated from on high that they may carry out their great task well. And, as their decisions will be of supreme interest to all humanity, there is no doubt that Catholics, for whom the support of order and civil progress is a duty of conscience, must invoke Divine assistance for all who take part in the peace conference. We desire that that duty be brought before all Catholics.

== See also ==
- List of encyclicals of Pope Benedict XV
