= Ad beatissimi Apostolorum =

1914 encyclical of Pope Benedict XV

Ad beatissimi Apostolorum Latin for 'To the Chair of the Prince of the Apostles' Encyclical of Pope Benedict XV
- Signature date: 1 November 1914
- Subject: Appealing for peace
- Number: 1 of 12 of the pontificate
- Text: In Latin; In English

Ad beatissimi Apostolorum is an encyclical of Pope Benedict XV given at St. Peter's, Rome, on the Feast of All Saints on November 1, 1914, in the first year of his pontificate. The first encyclical written by Pope Benedict XV coincided with the beginning of the First World War, which he labelled "the Suicide of Civilized Europe".

== Context ==
Benedict had studied at the Pontifical Ecclesiastical Academy in Rome, and spent much of his career in the diplomatic corps and the Secretariat of State. Benedict was elected pope September 3, 1914. The conclave itself was divided, not only politically, but in the cardinals' views on how to address the issue of Modernism in the Catholic Church. Shortly upon being elected, the pope "implored Kings and rulers to consider the floods of tears and of blood already poured out, and to hasten to restore to the nations the blessings of peace."

In maintaining neutrality and refusing to condemn either side, "he was condemned by the Allies as the German pope and by the Central Powers as the French pope."

== Content ==
Benedict described the combatants as the greatest and wealthiest nations of the earth, stating that "they are well-provided with the most awful weapons modern military science has devised, and they strive to destroy one another with refinements of horror. There is no limit to the measure of ruin and of slaughter; day by day the earth is drenched with newly shed blood and is covered with the bodies of the wounded and of the slain." In light of the senseless slaughter, the pope pleaded for "peace on earth to men of good will" (Luke 2:14), insisting that there are other ways and means whereby violated rights can be rectified.

Benedict viewed the war as symptomatic of much greater ills pervading society. He saw the origin of the evil in a neglect of the precepts and practices of Christian wisdom, particularly a lack of love and compassion. He saw materialism, nationalism, racism, and class warfare as characteristic of the age.

"Thus we see the absence from the relation of men of mutual love with their fellow men; the authority of rulers is held in contempt; injustice reigns in relations between the classes of society; the striving for transient and perishable things is so keen, that men have lost sight of the other and more worthy goods they have to obtain."

"Never perhaps was there more talking about the brotherhood of men than there is today. … But in reality never was there less brotherly activity amongst men than at the present moment. Race hatred has reached its climax; peoples are more divided by jealousies than by frontiers; within one and the same nation, within the same city there rages the burning envy of class against class; and amongst individuals it is self-love which is the supreme law overruling everything."

In December 1914, Benedict attempted to persuade the parties to observe a Christmas truce, “that the guns may fall silent at least upon the night the angels sang.” Although ignored, there were informal, unauthorized truces along parts of the front line.

== See also ==
- List of encyclicals of Pope Benedict XV
