= Bonum sane =

1920 motu proprio letter by Benedict XV, on world politics and morality

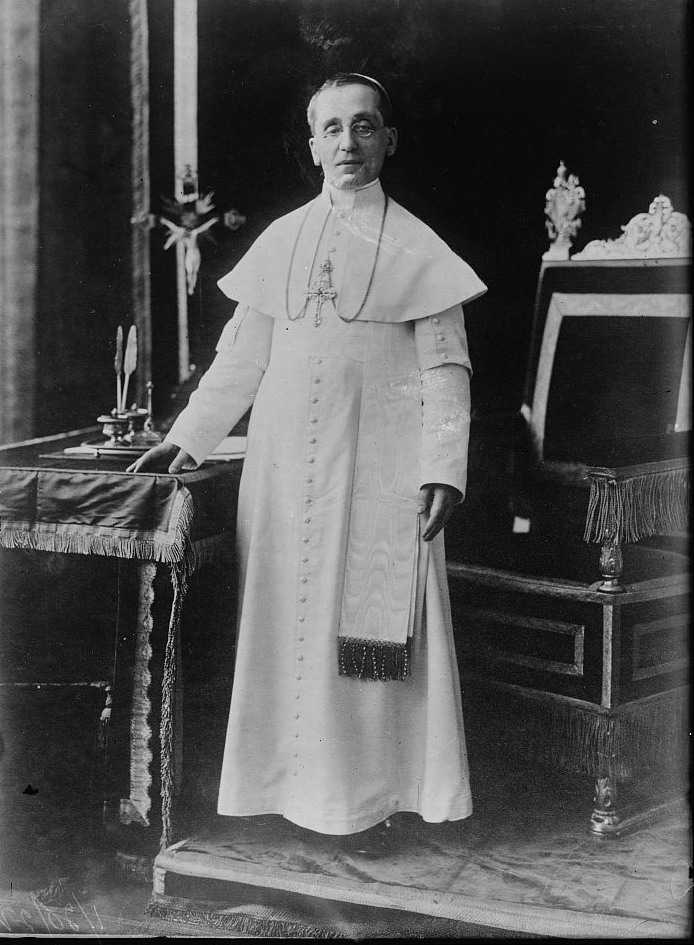
Benedict XV

Bonum sane is a motu proprio on Saint Joseph written by Pope Benedict XV and delivered on July 25, 1920.

In 1870 Pope Pius IX issued the decree "Quemadmodum Deus", proclaiming Saint Joseph Patron of the Church. In commemoration of the fiftieth anniversary of the proclamation, in 1920 Pope Benedict XV issued a motu proprio, "Bonum Sane".

== Description ==
In it Benedict takes notes of the economic hardship and moral laxity occasioned by the recent World War, and cautions about "the advent of a universal republic, which is based on the absolute equality of men and the communion of goods, and in which there is no longer any distinction of nationality, does not recognize the authority of the father upon the children, nor the public authorities and citizens, nor of God on the men in civilian consortium. All things which, if implemented, would lead to terrible social convulsions, like that already happening now in no small part of Europe."

He proposed that instead of being drawn to socialism, "the sworn enemy of Christian principles", working men should follow Saint Joseph as their guide and special patron. Benedict quoted his predecessor, Leo XIII:

For Joseph, of royal blood, united by marriage to the greatest and holiest of women, reputed the father of the Son of God, passed his life in labour, and won by the toil of the artisan the needful support of his family. It is, then, true that the condition of the lowly has nothing shameful in it, and the work of the labourer is not only not dishonouring, but can, if virtue be joined to it, be singularly ennobled. ... Through these considerations, the poor and those who live by the labour of their hands should be of good heart and learn to be just. If they win the right of emerging from poverty and obtaining a better rank by lawful means, reason and justice uphold them in changing the order established, in the first instance, for them by the Providence of God. But recourse to force and struggles by seditious paths to obtain such ends are madnesses which only aggravate the evil which they aim to suppress.

He emphasized that the family is the "core and basis" of human society, and encouraged families to be guided by the example of the Holy Family. Benedict affirmed that strengthening the domestic society with purity, harmony and fidelity, would not only effect an improvement in private morals, but also in the life of the community.

Referencing the practices of honoring St. Joseph during the month of March, and on Wednesdays, he called on the bishops to promote veneration of Saint Joseph.
