= Humani generis redemptionem =

1917 papal encyclical by Benedict XV

Humani generis redemptionem Latin for 'Redemption of the human race' Encyclical of Pope Benedict XV
- Signature date: 15 June 1917
- Subject: On preaching the Word of God
- Number: 2 of 12 of the pontificate
- Text: In Latin; In English

Humani generis redemptionem is an encyclical by Pope Benedict XV given at St. Peter's, Rome, on 15 June, the Feast of the Sacred Heart of Jesus in the year 1917, in the third of his Pontificate. The encyclical points to an ever-increasing number of Christian preachers and an ever-decreasing effect of their preaching. He admonished bishops to be preachers first of all, and to be more careful in the selection of preachers and confessors, for whom Humani generis redemptionem prescribed basic preconditions.

== Description ==
There are more preachers of the Word than ever before according to Benedict XV, but in the state of public and private morals, the constitutions and laws of nations, there is a general disregard and forgetfulness of the supernatural, a gradual falling away from the strict standard of Christian virtue, and that men are slipping back into the shameful practices of paganism. The Pope squarely put part of the blame on those ministers of the Gospel who do not handle it as they should. It is not the times but the incompetent Christian preachers who are to blame: For no one can maintain that the Apostles were living in better times than ours, that they found minds more readily disposed towards the Gospel or that they met with less opposition to the law of God. First in line are the Catholic bishops: The Council of Trent taught, that preaching "is the paramount duty of Bishops." And the Apostles, whose successors the bishops are, looked upon it as something peculiarly theirs. St. Paul writes: "For Christ sent us not to baptize, but to preach the Gospel. Council of Trent Bishops are required to select for this priestly office those only who are "fit," i.e. those who "can exercise the ministry of preaching with profit to souls." Profit to souls, does not mean eloquently or with popular applause, but with spiritual fruit. The Pope requests that all those priests are weeded out, who are incapable of preaching or of hearing confession. Priests have to concentrate on the word on God and not on popularity contests:

- Hence that unrestrained and undignified gesture such as may be seen on the stage or on the hustings, that effeminate lowering of the voice or those tragic outbursts; that diction peculiar to journalism; those frequent allusions to profane and non-Catholic literature, but not to the Sacred Scriptures or the Holy Fathers; finally that volubility of utterance often affected by them, wherewith they strike the ears and gain their hearers' admiration, but give them no lesson to carry home. How sadly are those preachers deceived! Granted that they receive the applause of the uneducated, which they seek with such great favor, and not without sacrilege, is it really worthwhile when we consider that they are condemned by every prudent man, and, what is worse, have reason to fear the stern judgment of Christ?

Benedict XV recalls the Apostle Paul’s spiritual preparation for preaching mentioning three qualities. A preacher was a man who always fully conformed himself to God's will. For Christ's sake he was indifferent to poverty or wealth, praise or contempt, life or death. He would not avoid labour or trouble of any kind. And he was a man of prayer not of studious preparation.

- What gives a man's words life and vigor and makes them promote wonderfully the salvation of souls is Divine grace: "God gave the increase." [I Cor. iii:6] But the grace of God is not gained by study and practice: it is won by prayer. Therefore, he who is little given to prayer or neglects it altogether, vainly spends his time and labor in preaching, for in God's sight his sermons profit neither himself nor those who hear him.

== See also ==
- List of encyclicals of Pope Benedict XV
