= Motu proprio =

Type of document issued by the Pope

In law, motu proprio (Latin for 'on his own impulse') describes an official act taken without a formal request from another party. Some jurisdictions use the term sua sponte for the same concept.

In Catholic canon law, it refers to a document issued by the pope on his own initiative and personally signed by him. Such a document may be addressed to the whole church, to part of it, or to some individuals. The first papal motu proprio was promulgated by Pope Innocent VIII in 1484. It continues to be a common form of papal rescript, especially when establishing institutions, making minor changes to law or procedure, and when granting favours to persons or institutions.

== Catholic Church ==
=== Effect ===
An important effect of issuing a document in this way is that a rescript containing the clause motu proprio is valid and produces its effect even in cases where fraud would ordinarily have vitiated the document, since the pope does not rely on the reasons alleged when he grants a favour. Withholding of the truth in what, according to canonical law, style and practice, must for validity be expressed, normally renders a rescript invalid, but not if the rescript is issued motu proprio. Consequently, canonists traditionally called the clause the "mother of repose". The designation motu proprio indicates that the validity of the document is independent of the validity of whatever reasons may have been adduced in a request for its issuance.

However, a motu proprio has no effect in so far as it harms the acquired right of another or is contrary to a law or approved custom, unless it expressly states that it is derogating from these matters.

=== Form ===
A motu proprio rescript begins by giving the reasons for issuing it, and then indicates the law or regulation made or the favour granted. It is less formal than a constitution and carries no papal seal. Its content may be instructional (e.g., on the use of chant), administrative (e.g., concerning a church law or the establishment of a commission), or merely to confer a special favour.

== Civil law ==
More generically, this phrase (or proprio motu; Latin allows free word order) is used to indicate an act taken by a court without a motion from a party to the case. The term is used very rarely in legal opinions in the United States, where sua sponte is preferred, but proprio motu is used in Canada. Proprio motu is used to refer to a decision by the prosecutor of the International Criminal Court to initiate an investigation into a situation without a referral from the Security Council or a state party; this power is granted by article 15(1) of the Rome Statute. European Court of Justice judgments use the phrase "of its own motion" and its equivalent in other community languages.

As it relates to a monarch, the term motu proprio describes the condition of a royal decree being made expressly on the sovereign's initiative, a practice more usual in some nations than in others.

Relating to orders of chivalry, like the Order of Malta, the grand master according to the statutes can confer the order motu proprio, instead of in response to a nomination by a national delegation.

== See also ==
- List of motu proprios
