= Basilica of Our Lady of Lourdes, Nancy =

Basilica in Nancy, France

- Basilique Notre-Dame-de-Lourdes de Nancy
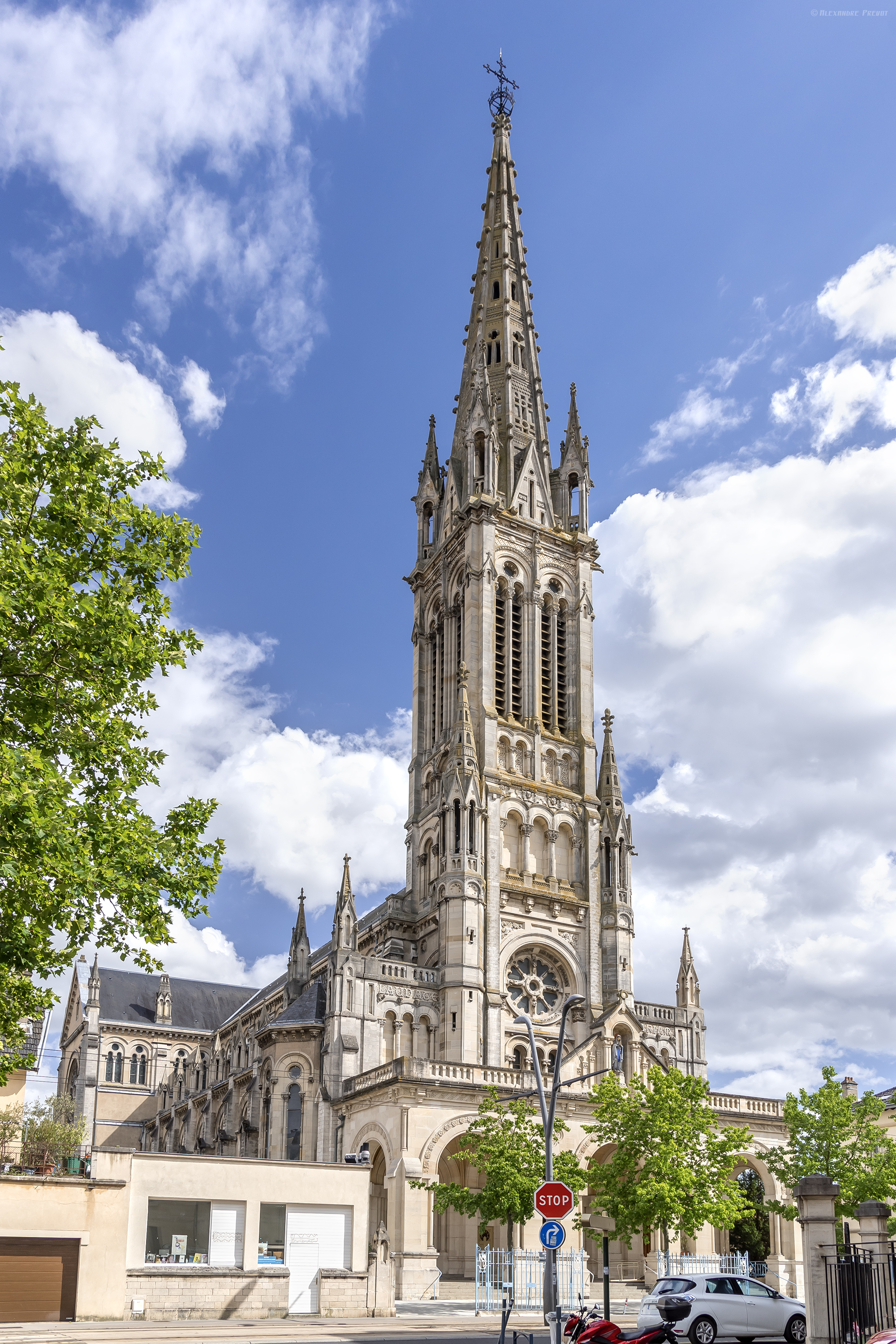

Religion
- District: Meurthe-et-Moselle
- Region: Grand Est
- Ecclesiastical or organizational status: Minor basilica
- Status: Active

Location
- Location: Nancy, France
- Country: France
- Interactive map of Basilica of Our Lady of Lourdes, Nancy
- Coordinates: 48.6735°N 6.1750°E

Architecture
- Architect: Jules Criqui
- Groundbreaking: 1908
- Completed: 1933

Website
- Parish website

The Basilica of Our Lady of Lourdes, Nancy (French: Basilique Notre-Dame-de-Lourdes de Nancy) is a minor basilica in Nancy, France, built in the southwestern part of the city in the early 20th century. It was designed by architect Jules Criqui with contributions from Abbé Léon Loevenbruck.

== History ==
Construction of the basilica was initiated on July 30, 1908, by Charles-François Turinaz, then Bishop of Nancy. It was intended to serve as the center of Nancy's fourteenth parish and was built on the site of the former chapel of the Brothers of Saint-Charles. In a letter dated August 25, 1908, Pope Pius X praised the decision. The foundation stone was laid and blessed by Bishop Turinaz on October 25, 1908. Turinaz also blessed the first three bells of the church on December 13, 1908. The foundations were completed by late winter 1909, and on July 2, 1912, during the Feast of the Visitation, the initial portion of the church was inaugurated in a solemn ceremony presided over by Bishop Turinaz.

Work slowed significantly during World War I, but the nave was completed by March 16, 1924. The church was consecrated on July 2, 1924, by Bishop Hippolyte-Marie de La Celle. The main portal was finished on October 1, 1925, and the spire was inaugurated on September 22, 1929, accompanied by a "Te Deum" celebration. Additional works, including the spire's sculptural restoration in 1931 and the narthex in 1933, marked the final stages of construction.

The church was elevated to the rank of a minor basilica by Pope Pius XI on June 26, 1925.

=== Bells of Our Lady of Lourdes ===
The bells of the basilica
#	Name	Note	Weight	Founder	Year
1	Jeanne d'Arc	A^{2}	4200 kg	Jules Robert, Nancy	1931
2	Thérèse of the Child Jesus	B^{2}	3200 kg	Jules Robert, Nancy	1931
3	Gertrude	C#^{3}	2200 kg	Jules Robert, Nancy	1931
4	Marguerite-Marie	D^{3}	1900 kg	Jules Robert, Nancy	1931
5	Élisabeth	E^{3}	1400 kg	Jules Robert, Nancy	1931
6	Marie	A^{3}	515 kg	Jules Robert, Nancy	1908
7	Charlotte	B^{3}	378 kg	Jules Robert, Nancy	1908
8	Bernadette	C#^{4}	276 kg	Jules Robert, Nancy	1908

== Architecture ==
Designed by Jules Criqui, the basilica combines elements of Romanesque and Gothic styles to meet the respective preferences of Bishop Turinaz and Abbé Loevenbruck. The building's cruciform plan includes a semi-circular apse and a nave with three aisles.

The basilica is 76 meters long, with an interior length of 62 meters (excluding the porch). The nave is 21 meters wide, with the central aisle accounting for 11 meters. The height under the vault is 22.5 meters, while the spire reaches 84.2 meters. The tower houses eight bells, including "Jeanne d'Arc" (the bourdon) and others named for Catholic saints such as Thérèse and Bernadette.

Numerous sculpted capitals and painted murals enhance the basilica's transept portals. The building also features five chapels.

== Artists Involved ==
- Sculptors: Victor Huel (father and son)
- Painters: Jules Schneider
- Stained glass artists: Georges Janin and Joseph Benoît (workshops at 37 rue Hermite and 12 rue Lionnois, Nancy)
- Organ builders: Edmond Alexandre Roethinger, 1948

== Environment ==
A pair of peregrine falcons established a nest in the basilica's spire during the winter of 2003–2004.

== Community Use ==
The basement halls serve as meeting spaces and are used by various scouting organizations.

== Gallery ==
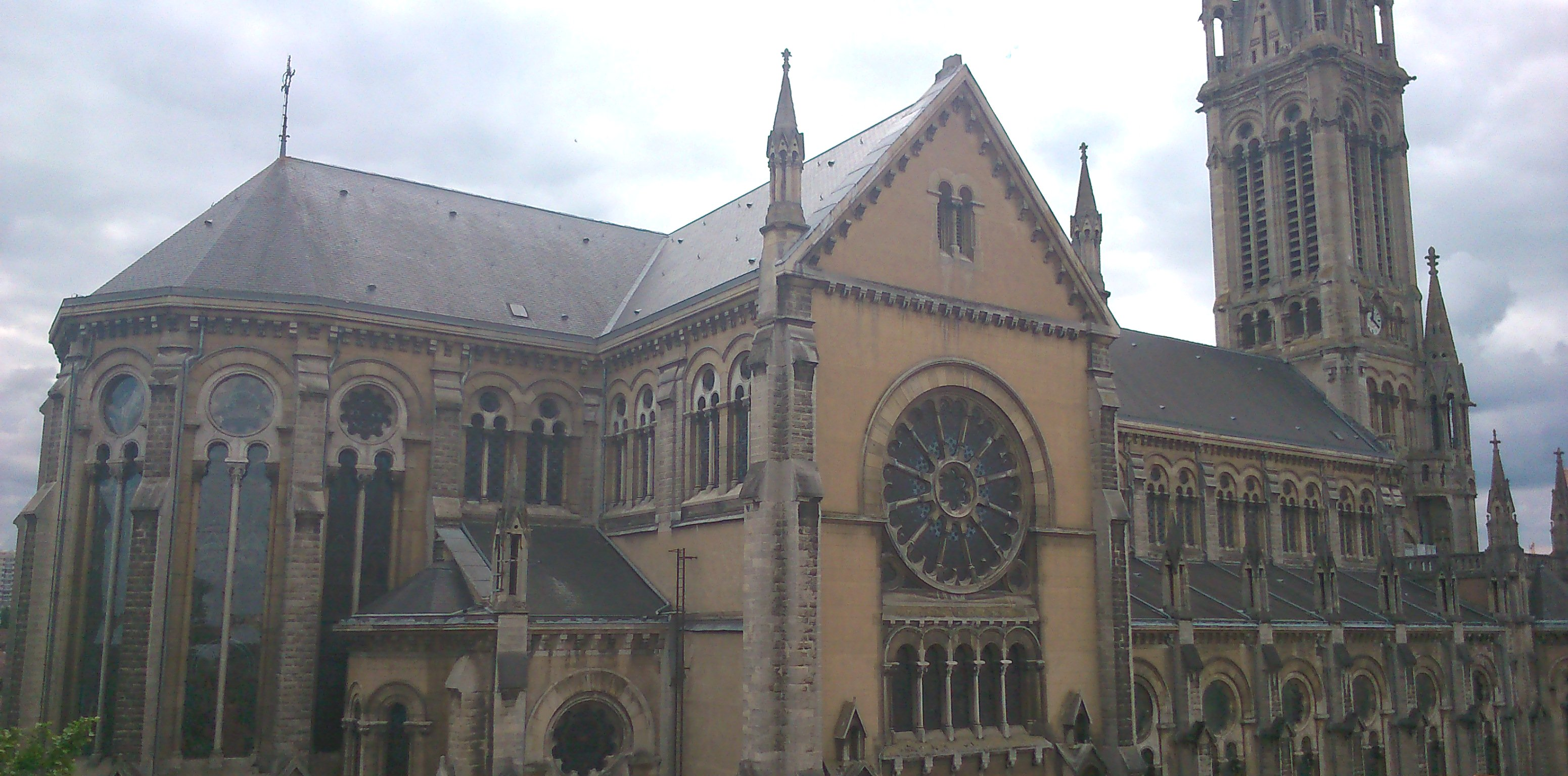
Side facade of the basilica.

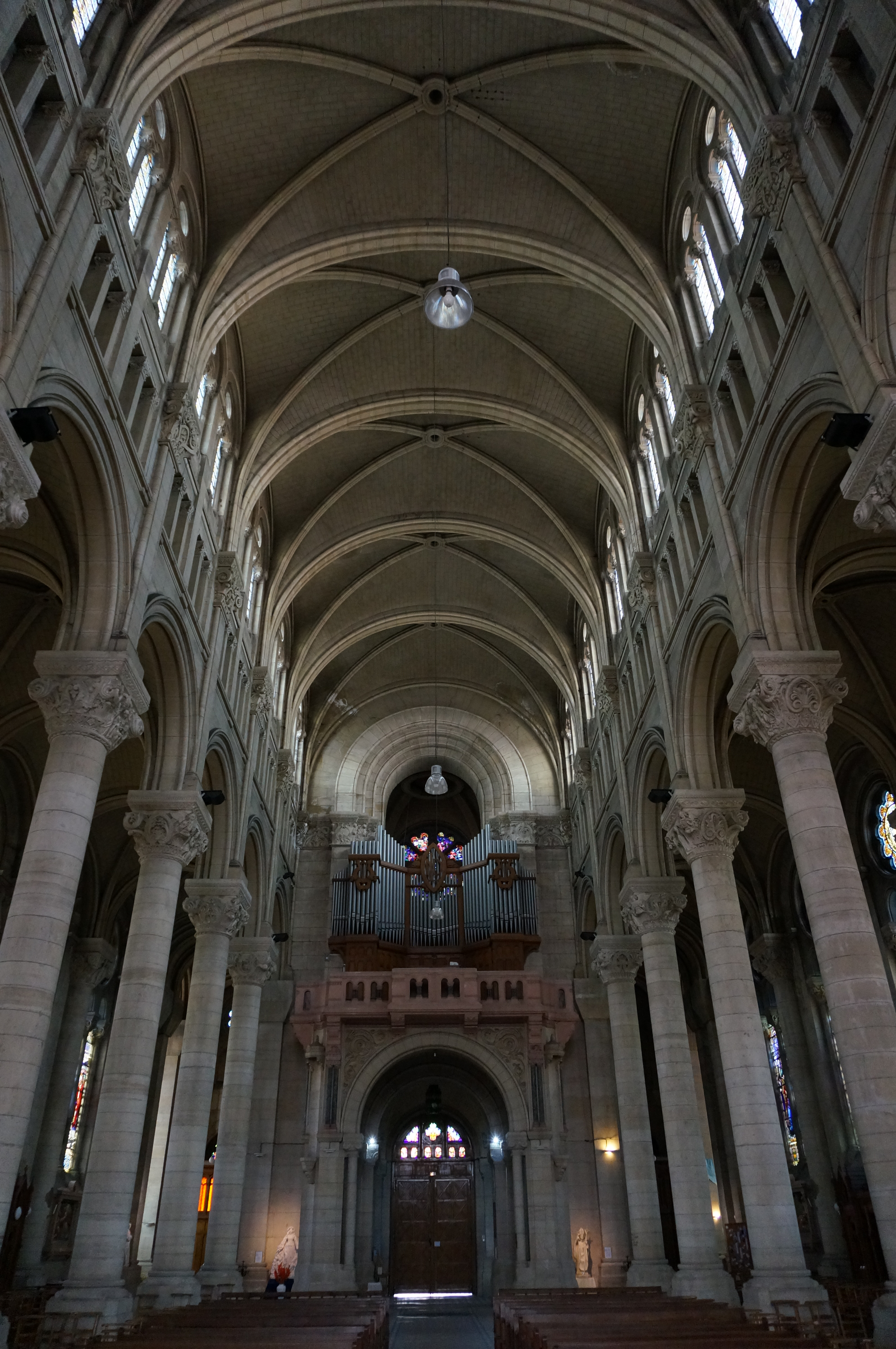
The nave.

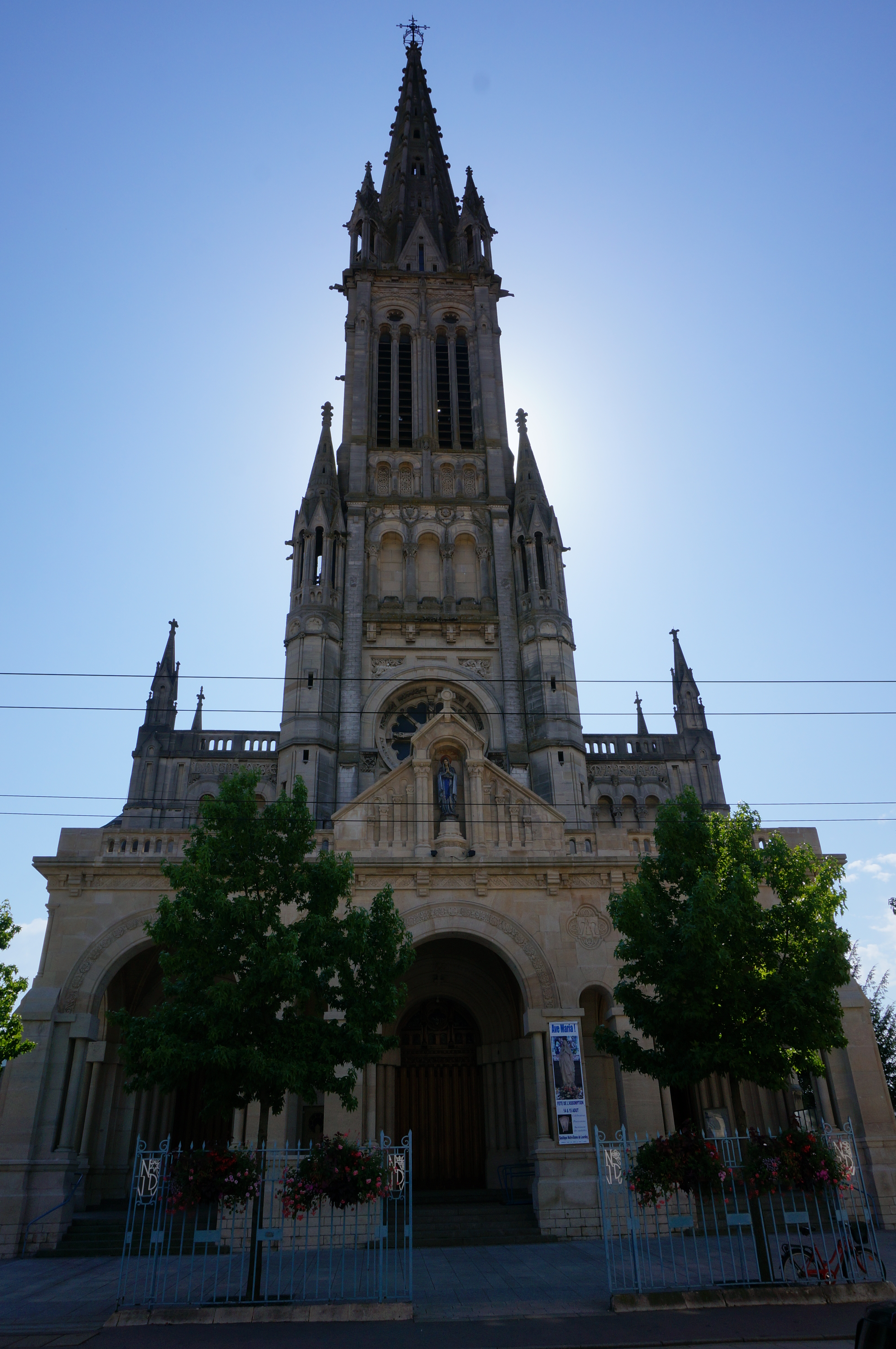
Entrance view from Avenue du Général-Leclerc.

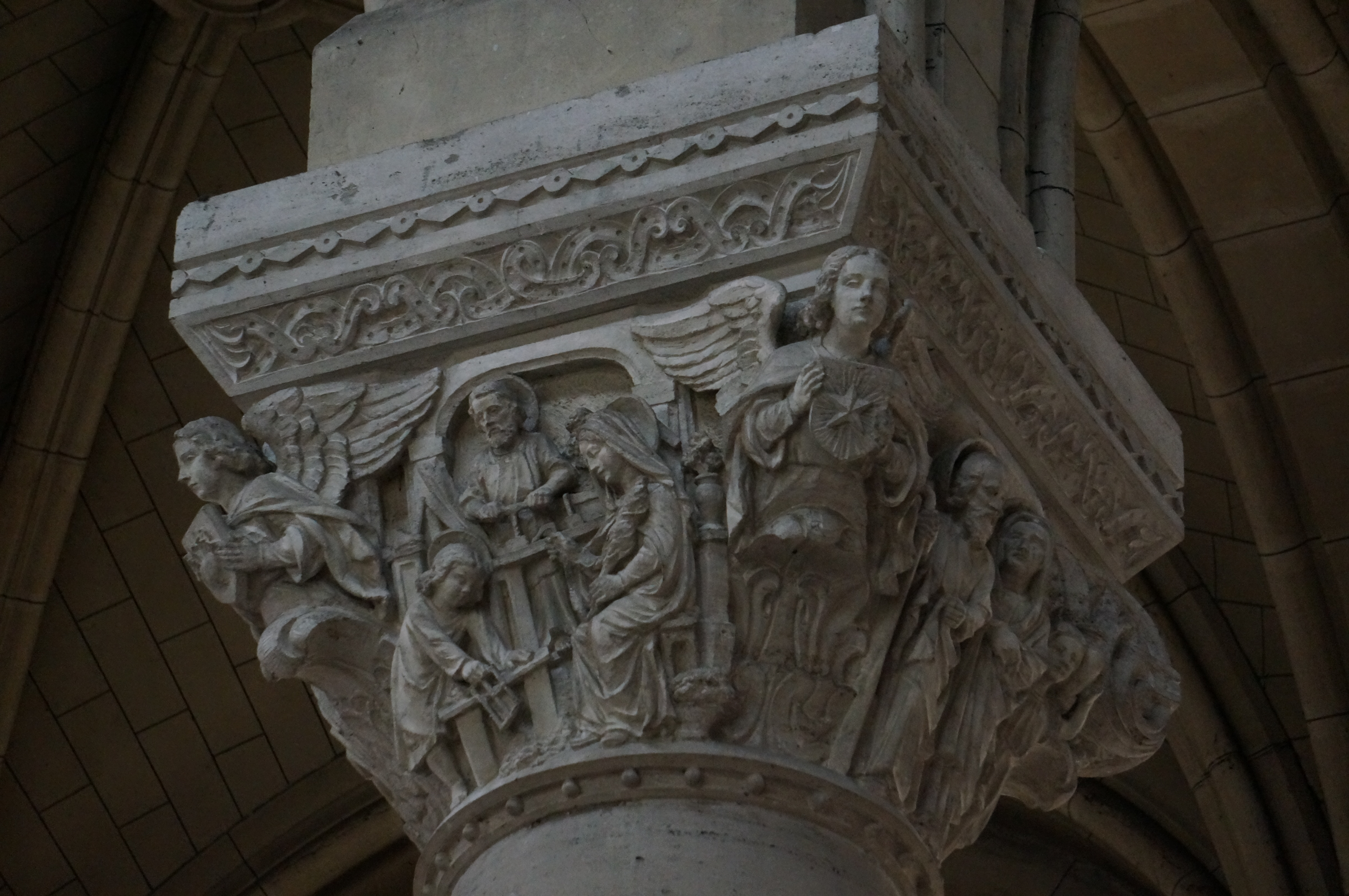
A sculpted capital.

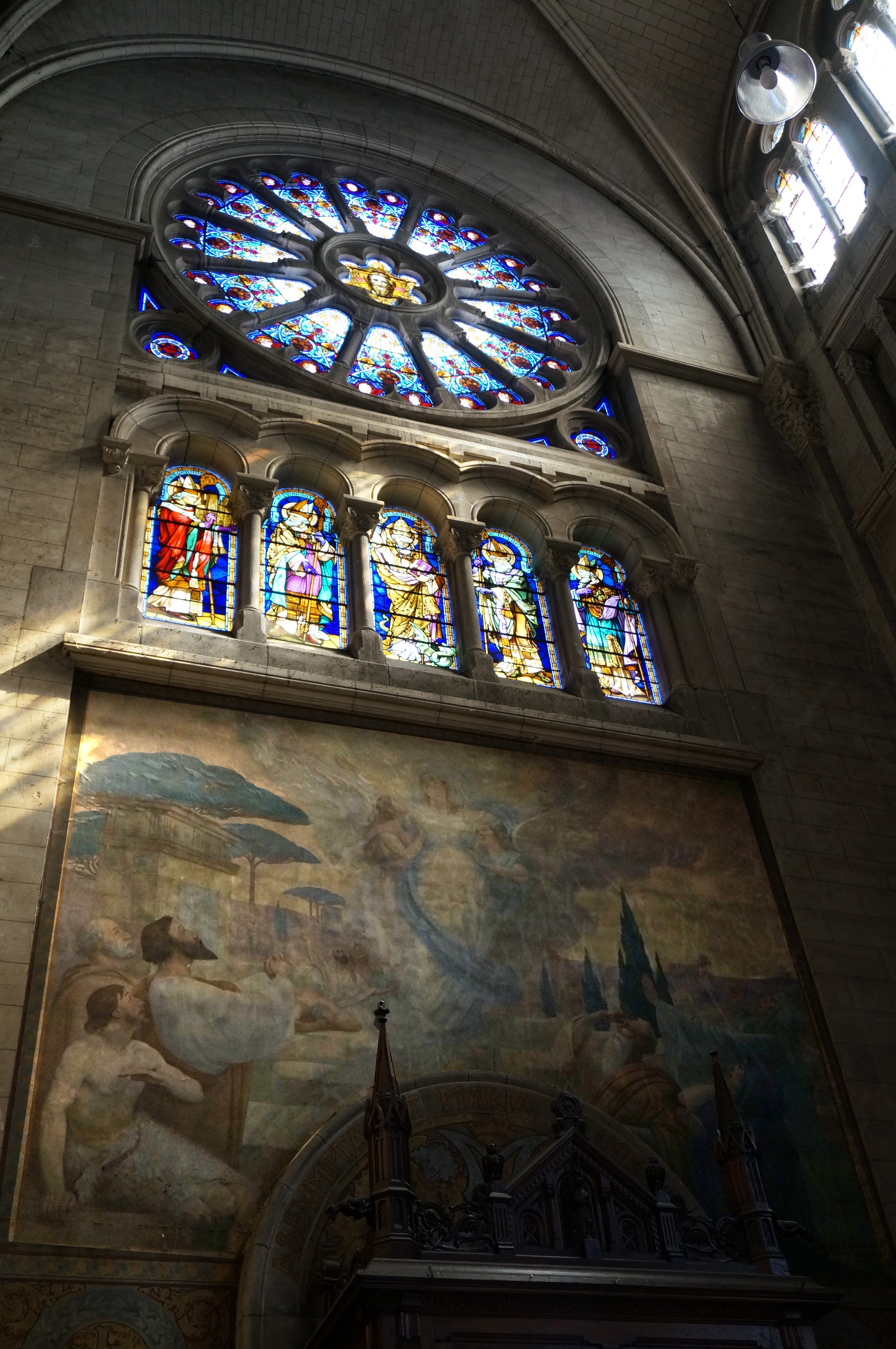
Transept portal with mural and stained glass.

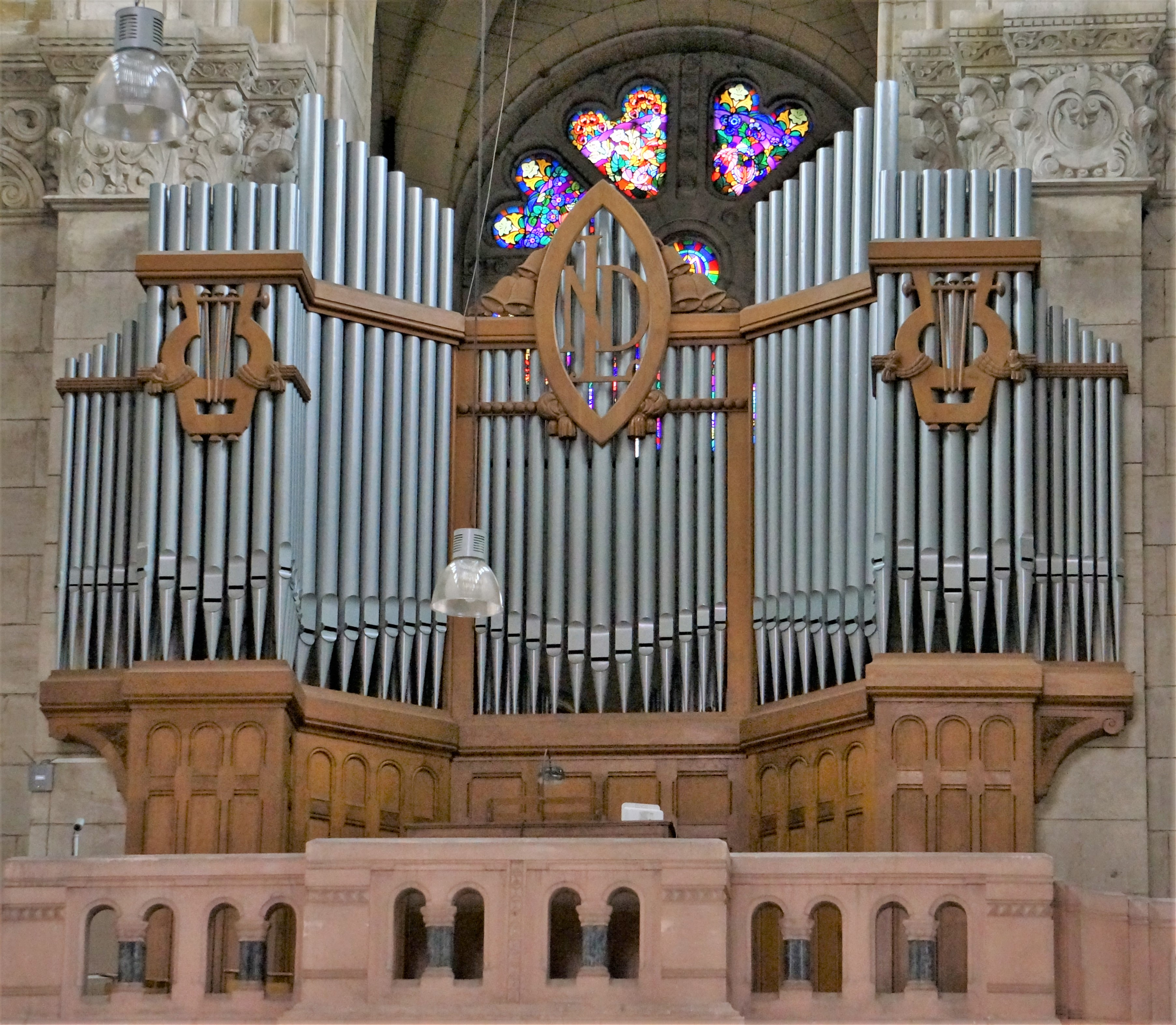
The basilica organ.
