= Basilica of the Sacred Heart of Nancy =

- Basilique du Sacré-Cœur de Nancy
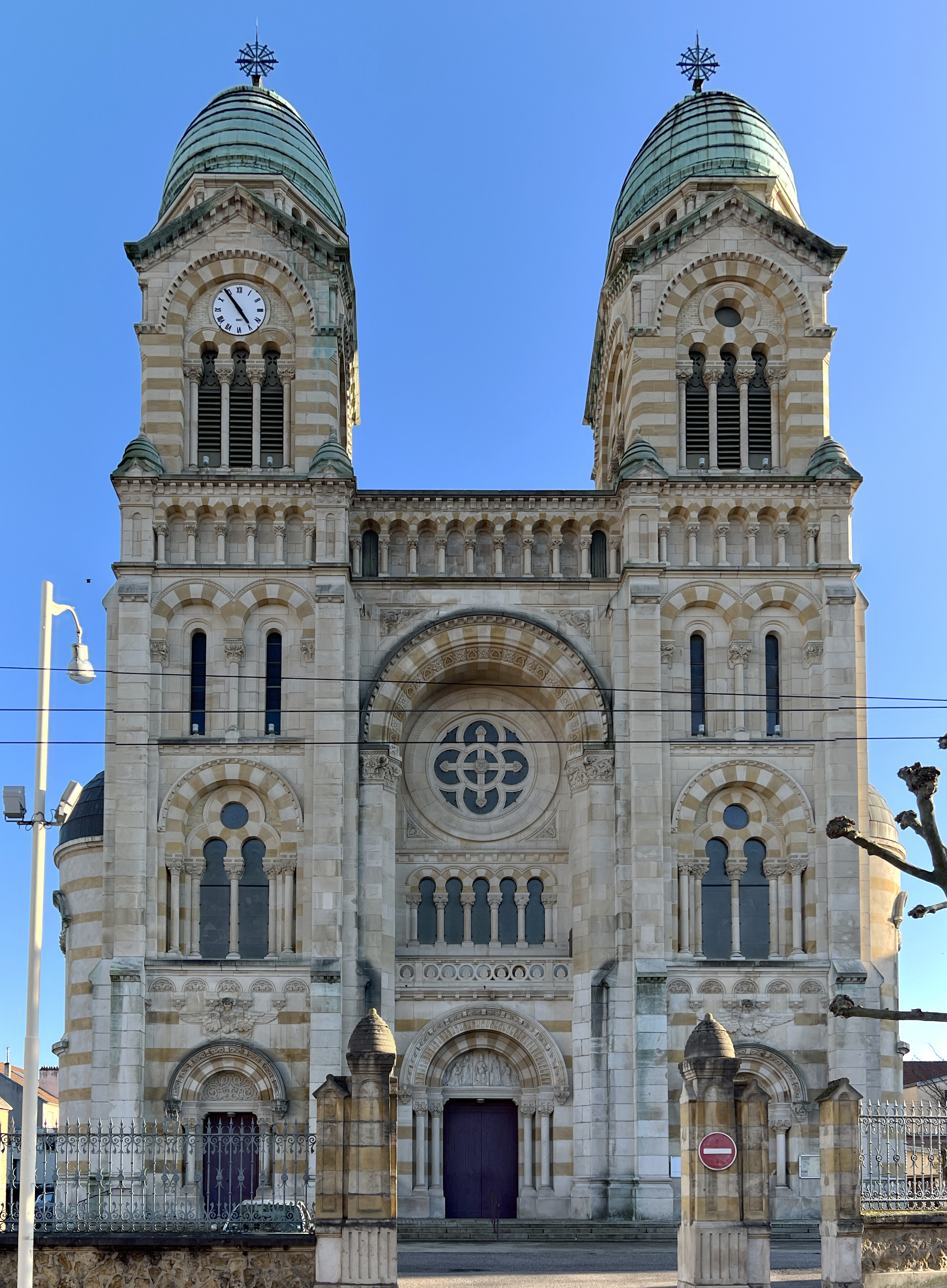
- The basilica viewed from the north
- Basilica of the Sacred Heart of Nancy
- 48.6857°N 6.1624°E
- Location: Nancy, Grand Est
- Country: France
- Denomination: Roman Catholic Church
- Website: Parish website

History
- Status: Minor basilica
- Dedication: Sacred Heart of Jesus

Architecture
- Architect(s): Anthony Rougieux and Jules Criqui
- Style: Romanesque-Byzantine
- Groundbreaking: 1902
- Completed: 1905

Administration
- District: Meurthe-et-Moselle

The Basilica of the Sacred Heart of Nancy (French: Basilique du Sacré-Cœur de Nancy) is a minor basilica of the Roman Catholic Church located in Nancy, France. It combines Romanesque and Byzantine styles and was inspired by the Basilica of the Sacred Heart of Montmartre in Paris. The basilica owes its construction to three key figures: Bishop Charles-François Turinaz, Canon Henri Blaise, and architect Anthony Rougieux. Situated in the western part of Nancy, near the border with Laxou, it is part of the Poincaré - Foch - Anatole France - Croix de Bourgogne neighborhood and is dedicated to the Sacred Heart of Jesus.

== History ==
On August 13, 1889, Charles-François Turinaz Bishop of Nancy-Toul decided to establish a new church between Nancy and Laxou to serve as the center of Nancy's twelfth parish. He entrusted Canon Henri Blaise (1863–1920), who was also his secretary, with overseeing the project and serving as the parish's first parish priest. Turinaz wrote: "I entrust you with the great and difficult mission of founding the new parish, which I place under the blessings, the power, and the marvelous fertility of the Sacred Heart of Jesus."

The building was designed and constructed by Anthony Rougieux (1854–1906), a well-trained architect in the eclectic style under Julien Guadet. The foundation stone was laid and blessed on June 9, 1902, and the statue of the Sacred Heart atop the dome was blessed on April 23, 1904. The basilica was completed in 1905.

Elevated to the status of a minor basilica in September 1905 by Pope Pius X, it was consecrated by Bishop Turinaz and opened for worship on November 15, 1905. The tintinnabulum and ombrellino are displayed in the choir.

The body of Bishop Turinaz is interred in the left transept of the basilica, as per his wishes. The body of Canon Blaise, Turinaz's universal legatee upon his death, lies in the right transept.

== Organ ==
The basilica houses an organ built by Charles Didier-Van-Caster (1852–1906), completed in 1907. It was inaugurated on May 30, 1907, by Charles-Marie Widor. The instrument has 48 stops across three manuals and a pedalboard, including two 32-foot ranks (bourdon 32 and contrebombarde 32).

A significant overhaul was carried out between 2016 and 2019 by Xavier Szymczak, organ builder and voicer, along with Frédéric Mayeur, the organist. The organ was blessed and inaugurated on June 2, 2019.

== Bells ==
The bourdon bell of the Basilica of the Sacred Heart, weighing nearly six tonnes, is the largest bell in Nancy and rings only on exceptional occasions, such as the death or election of a pope.

The Saint Charles Tower (west, right of the facade) houses the bourdon, while five smaller bells are located in the Saint Maurice Tower (east). These bells are adorned with intricate carvings and Gothic-style niches depicting various figures.

Bells of the Basilica of the Sacred Heart
#	Name	Note	Diameter	Weight	Tower	Founder	Year
1	Marguerite-Marie	G^{2}	2.10 m	5996 kg	West	Jules Robert, Nancy	1905
2	Marie-Madeleine	C^{3}	1.52 m	2329 kg	East	Jules Robert, Nancy	1905
3	Lazarine	D^{3}	1.34 m	1700 kg	East	Paccard, Haute-Savoie	1979
4	Marthe	E^{3}	1.23 m	1230 kg	East	Jules Robert, Nancy	1905
5	Gertrude	F^{3}	1.12 m	941 kg	East	Jules Robert, Nancy	1905
6	Jeanne	G^{3}	1 m	680 kg	East	Jules Robert, Nancy	1905

== Stained glass ==
The stained glass windows, created by Joseph Janin, were destroyed in 1917 during World War I. However, the original cartoons by Janin were preserved, allowing for their reconstruction after the war, with minor modifications to eliminate anachronistic elements such as the Eiffel Tower and the Basilica of the Sacred Heart of Montmartre from the depiction of "Jesus Weeping Over Jerusalem."

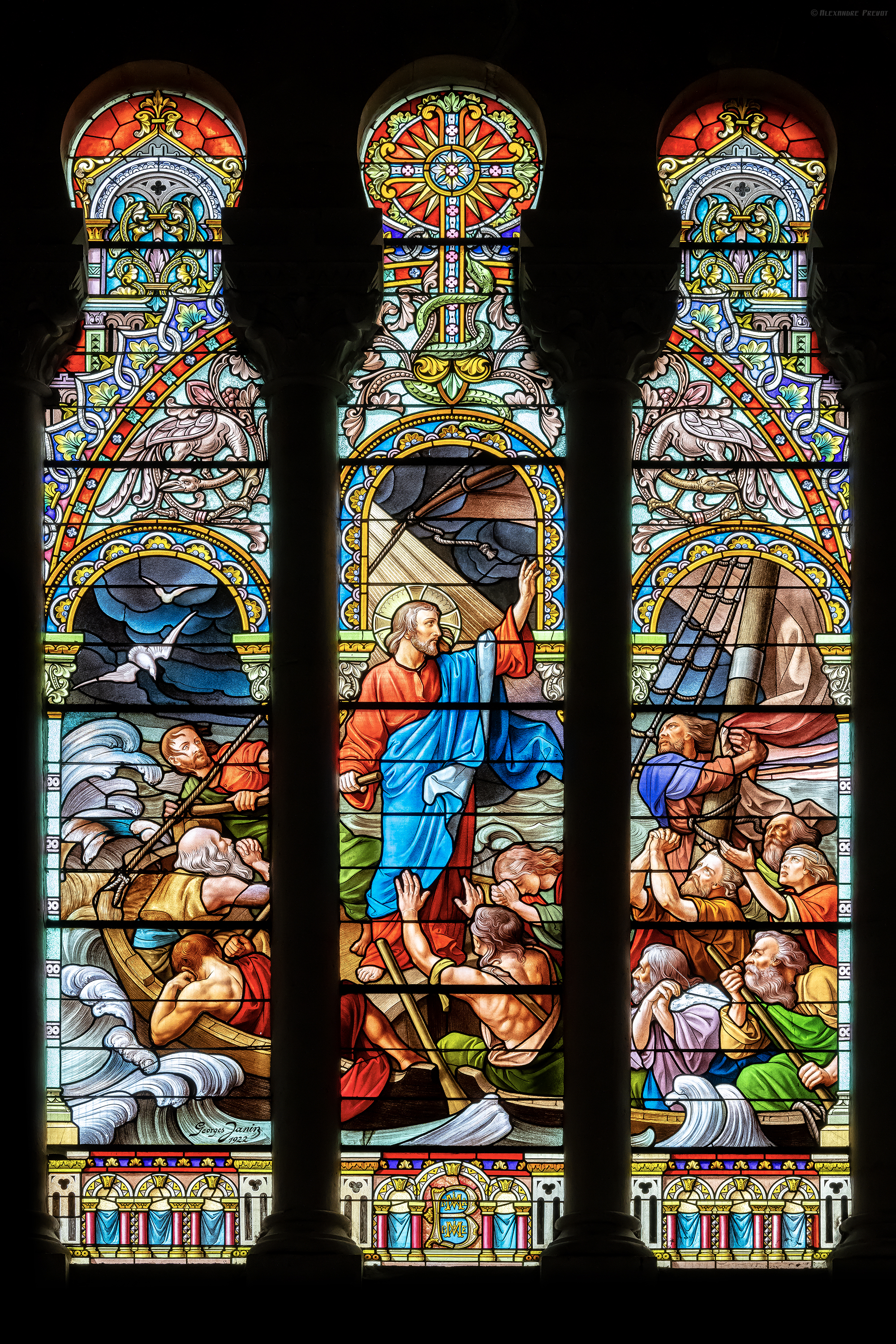
"The Calmed Storm"

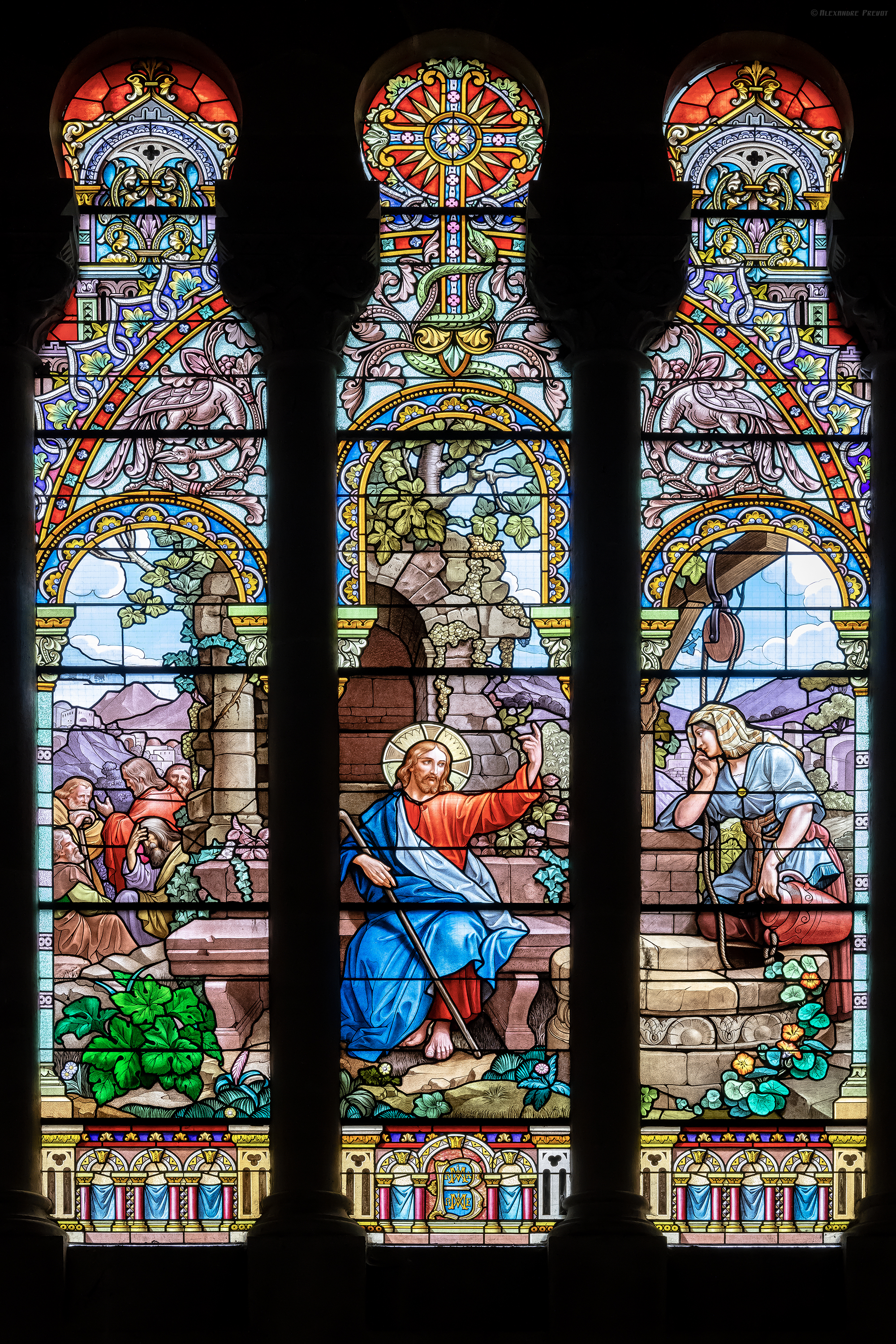
"The Samaritan Woman at the Well"
