= Hector Sévin =

Catholic cardinal (1852–1916)

His Eminence Hector-Irénée Sévin
- Cardinal, Archbishop of Lyon
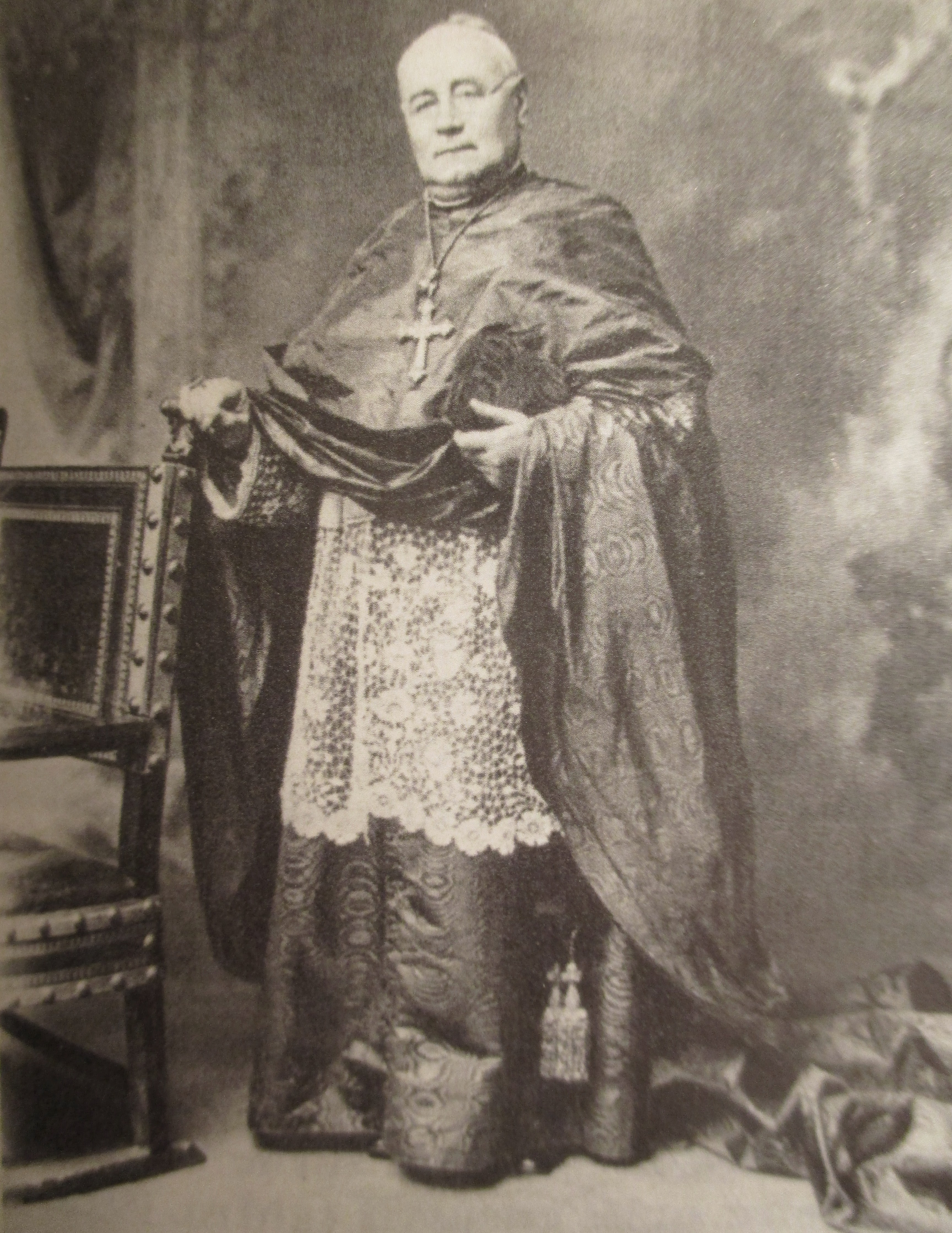
- Church: Roman Catholic Church
- Archdiocese: Lyon
- See: Lyon
- Appointed: 2 December 1912
- Term ended: 4 May 1916
- Predecessor: Pierre-Hector Coullié
- Successor: Louis-Joseph Maurin
- Other post: Cardinal-Priest of Santissima Trinità al Monte Pincio (1914–16)
- Previous post: Bishop of Châlons-en-Champagne (1908–12)

Orders
- Ordination: 10 June 1876 by Jean-Joseph Marchal
- Consecration: 5 April 1908 by Louis-Henri-Joseph Luçon
- Created cardinal: 25 May 1914 by Pope Pius X
- Rank: Cardinal-Priest

Personal details
- Born: Hector-Irénée Sevin; 22 March 1852 Simandre, Second French Empire
- Died: 4 May 1916 (aged 64) Lyon, French Third Republic
- Motto: Dona mihi populum meum
- Coat of arms

Styles of Hector Sévin
- Reference style: His Eminence
- Spoken style: Your Eminence
- Informal style: Cardinal
- See: Lyon

Hector Sévin (22 March 1852 – 4 May 1916) was a French Catholic prelate who served as Archbishop of Lyon from 1912 to 1916. He was made a cardinal in 1914.

Hector Sévin was born in Simandre, France to farmers Claude and Rosalee Sévin. He was educated at the Seminary of Belley and he received the diaconate on 22 May 1875.

== Priesthood ==
He was ordained on 7 June 1876. He served as subdirector of the institute for the deaf and mute in Bourg from 1875 until 1876 then as Professor of dogmatic theology, Scriptures, and ecclesiastical history at the Seminary of Belley from 1876 until 1889 and was its rector from 1889 to 1891. He was the Vicar general of the diocese of Belley in 1904.

== Episcopate ==
He was appointed as bishop of Châlons on 11 February 1908 by Pope Pius X. He was consecrated on 5 April 1908 in the cathedral of Belley, by Louis Luçon, Cardinal Archbishop of Reims. He was promoted to metropolitan see of Lyon on 12 December 1912.

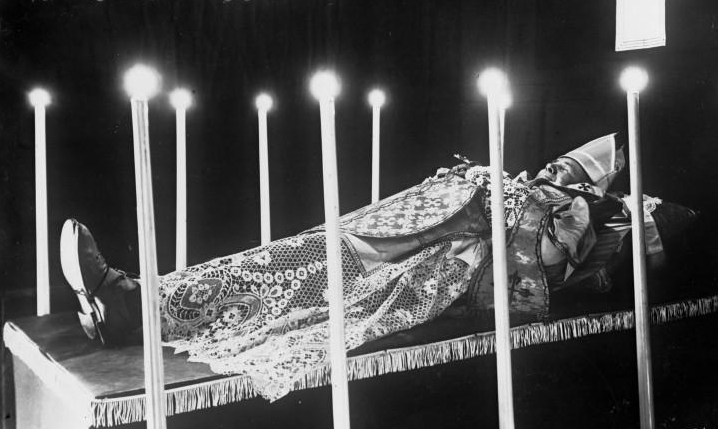
Hector Sévin on the funeral bier in Lyon on 11 May 1916.

== Cardinalate ==
He was created Cardinal-Priest of SS. Trinità al Monte Pincio in the consistory of May 25, 1914 by Pope Pius X. He took part in the conclave of 1914 that elected Pope Benedict XV.

He died in 1916 of peritonitis.

Preceded by Pierre-Hector Coullie	Archbishop of Lyon; 12 December 1912 – 4 May 1916	Succeeded by Louis-Joseph Maurin
