= Mater Admirabilis =

1844 fresco by Pauline Perdrau

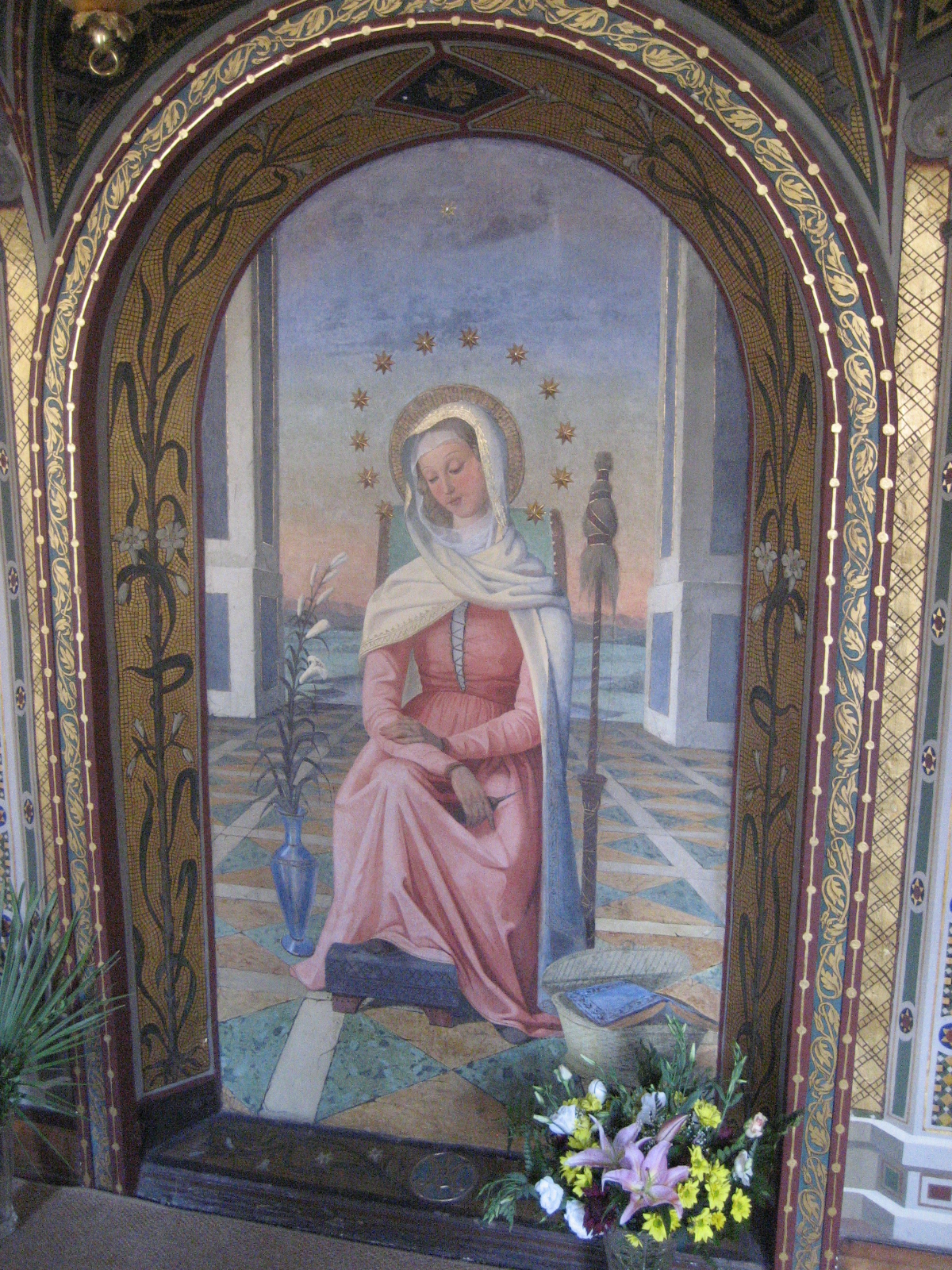
Mater Admirabilis

Mater Admirabilis is a fresco depicting the Virgin Mary, in the monastery of the Trinità dei Monti, in Rome. It was painted in 1844 by a young French artist, Pauline Perdrau, and has been associated with several miracles. October 20 is the feast of Mater Admirabilis in the Catholic Church, as observed by the Society of the Sacred Heart.

== History ==
In 1494, Francis of Paola, establish a monastery for the Order of Minims. In 1502, Louis XII of France began construction of the church of the Trinità dei Monti next to the monastery, to celebrate his successful invasion of Naples. By the Diplomatic Conventions of 14 May and 8 September 1828 between the Holy See and the Government of France the church and monastery were entrusted to a French religious congregation, the Society of the Sacred Heart.

Born in 1817, Pauline Perdrau was a postulant in the Society. In 1844, Perdrau painted a fresco of the Virgin Mary on a wall in a recreational area of the convent. She depicted Mary as a young woman in a rose-colored dress rather than as a Madonna in blue. Perdrau's inexperience resulted in a fresco with colors more bright and vivid than intended. The Mother Superior had it covered it with a large piece of fabric to give the paint time to dry. The original title of the painting was the "Madonna of the Lily".

Two years later, on October 20, 1846, Pope Pius IX visited the monastery and viewed Perdrau's painting, by which time the colours had faded and blended together to create a much softer image. The Pope declared it Mater Admirabilis, “Mother Most Admirable”, and authorized changing the corridor into a chapel.

Miracles have been reported due to the intercession of Mary under the title Mater Admirabilis. John Bosco, Therese of Lisieux, Pope Pius X, Vincent Pallotti and Luigi Orione are among those who have visited the chapel.

Madeleine Sophie Barat, founder of the Society, said of the painting, "...I often take a turn to go look at her. She attracts me because she is the age of our students and speaks to me of the young people to whom I have vowed my life". Barat directed that a copy of the image be displayed in their schools. Mater Admirabilis is the patroness of students of the Sacred Heart schools.

== See also ==
- Refugium Peccatorum Madonna (Crosio)

== Sources ==
Perdrau, Pauline, Les Loisiers de l'Abbaye: Souvenirs inédits de la Mère Pauline Perdrau sur la Vie de Notre Vénérée Mère Gœtz, Rome, Maison Mère, 1936
