= Pious Establishments of France =

The Pious Establishments of France in Rome and Loreto is a foundation run by France from its embassy to the Holy See.

Some of its property is governed by bilateral agreements between France and the Holy See, such as certain monastic buildings that are used by religious institutes.

The foundation's origins date back to a bequest made by the Cardinal de Joyeuse, ambassador of France to the Holy See under Henry IV, and by Anne of Austria, in 1635.

== Property ==
The foundation administers the five national churches of France in Rome:

- The Church of the Santissima Trinità dei Monti (overlooking the Piazza di Spagna),
- The Church of St. Louis of the French (between the Pantheon and the Piazza Navona),
- The Church of Saint Ivo of the Bretons (near the Piazza Navona),
- The Church of SS. Claudius and Andrew of the Burgundians (between the Palazzo Montecitorio and the Piazza di Spagna),
- The Church of Saint Nicholas of the Lorrains (right next to the Piazza Navona).

The foundation also comprises a number of important buildings in Rome, as well as the National Chaplaincy of France in Loreto.

== Attempted annexation by Mussolini in 1943 ==
Benito Mussolini's fascist government wanted to win a propaganda coup by humiliating France. It demanded the surrender of all property belonging to the "Pious Establishments" and the Villa Medici by the representatives of the French embassy to the Holy See.

French ambassador Léon Bérard, along with his advisor Georges de Blesson, were not permitted to leave the Vatican, where they had taken refuge following the 1940 Armistice. They were thus able to avoid the diplomatic expulsion that targeted the staff of the French embassy to Italy.

François de Vial, French attaché to the Holy See, was permitted to live at the seat of the French Embassy, the Palazzo Taverna-Orsini. He became the only French person with a permanent residence in Rome to be allowed to travel freely in Rome. As the de facto guardian of the Foundation of the Pious Establishments, it was his task to negotiate with the fascist government to avoid the annexation of its property. This was before the fall of the Grand Council of Fascism on 24 July 1943. He was helped in this task by the bishop Montini, the future Paul VI.
