= Louis-Joseph Maurin =

His Eminence Louis-Joseph Maurin
- Archbishop of Lyon
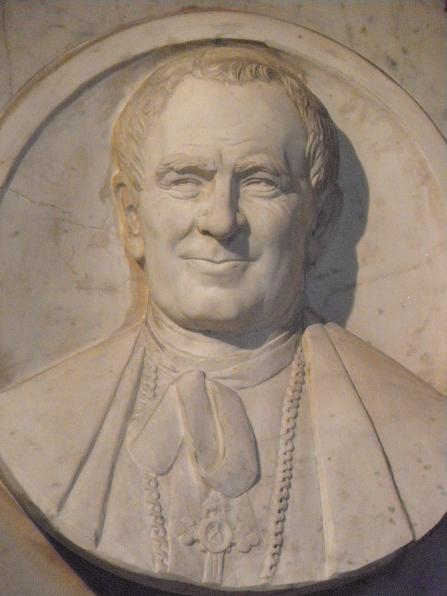
- Church: Roman Catholic Church
- Archdiocese: Lyon
- See: Lyon
- Appointed: 1 December 1916
- Installed: 25 January 1917
- Term ended: 16 November 1936
- Predecessor: Hector-Irénée Sévin
- Successor: Pierre-Marie Gerlier
- Other post: Cardinal-Priest of Santissima Trinità al Monte Pincio (1916–36)
- Previous posts: Bishop of Grenoble (1911–16); Apostolic Administrator of Langres (1918–19)

Orders
- Ordination: 8 April 1882
- Consecration: 24 October 1911 by Paulin-Pierre Andrieu
- Created cardinal: 4 December 1916 by Pope Benedict XV
- Rank: Cardinal-Priest

Personal details
- Born: Louis-Joseph Maurin; 15 February 1859 La Ciotat, Second French Empire
- Died: 16 November 1936 (aged 77) Lyon, French Third Republic
- Buried: Lyon Cathedral
- Motto: Cor Unum et anima una
- Coat of arms

Styles of Louis-Joseph Maurin
- Reference style: His Eminence
- Spoken style: Your Eminence
- Informal style: Cardinal
- See: Lyon

Louis-Joseph Maurin (15 February 1859 – 16 November 1936) was a Roman Catholic Cardinal and Archbishop of Lyon.

== Biography ==
He was born in La Ciotat to Dominique-François and Joséphine-Françoise Arnaud. He studied in Marseilles and Rome, and obtained a doctorate in theology and a licentiate in canon law.

Maurin was ordained to the priesthood on 8 April 1882 in Rome. He did pastoral work in the diocese of Marseille from 1882 until 1911. On 1 September 1911 Pope Pius X appointed him Bishop of Grenoble, being consecrated by Pierre Andrieu in October of that year.

He remained in Grenoble until Pope Benedict XV appointed him Archbishop of Lyon on 1 December 1916. Three days later he was created and proclaimed Cardinal-Priest of SS. Trinità al Monte Pincio. Cardinal Maurin voted in the conclave of 1922 that elected Pope Pius XI.

He died in office on 16 November 1936 and he is buried in the metropolitan cathedral of Lyon.

Catholic Church titles
Preceded by Hector Sévin	Archbishop of Lyon; 1 December 1916 – 16 November 1936	Succeeded by Pierre-Marie Gerlier
