= Étienne-Joseph Hurault =

French Roman Catholic bishop

- Bishop of Nancy and Toul
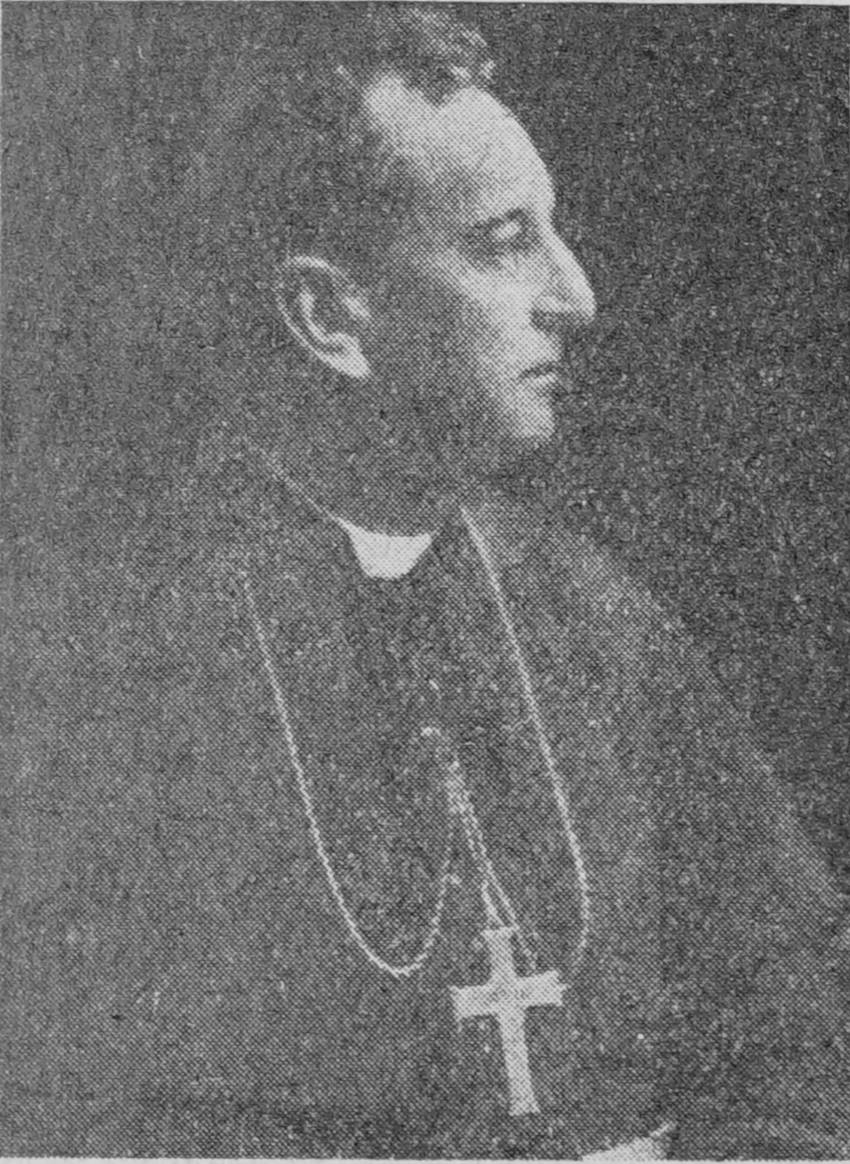
- Church: Catholic Church
- Diocese: Diocese of Nancy and Toul
- In office: 23 December 1930 – 7 April 1934
- Predecessor: Hippolyte-Marie de La Celle
- Successor: Marcel Fleury

Orders
- Ordination: 19 December 1896
- Consecration: 25 March 1924 by Joseph Tissier

Personal details
- Born: 28 October 1873 Châlons-sur-Marne, Marne, France
- Died: 7 April 1934 (aged 60) Nancy, Meurthe-et-Moselle, France

Étienne-Joseph Hurault (28 October 1873, in Châlons-sur-Marne – 7 April 1934) was a French Roman Catholic bishop.

He was bishop of Viviers from 1923 to 1930 (designated 20 December 1923, ordained bishop 25 March 1924 and installed the following 1 April) and bishop of Nancy from 1930 to 1934 (designated bishop 23 December 1930, installed 12 February 1931).
