= Pierre-Marie Gerlier =

French Cardinal

His Eminence Pierre-Marie Paul Gerlier
- Cardinal, Archbishop of Lyon
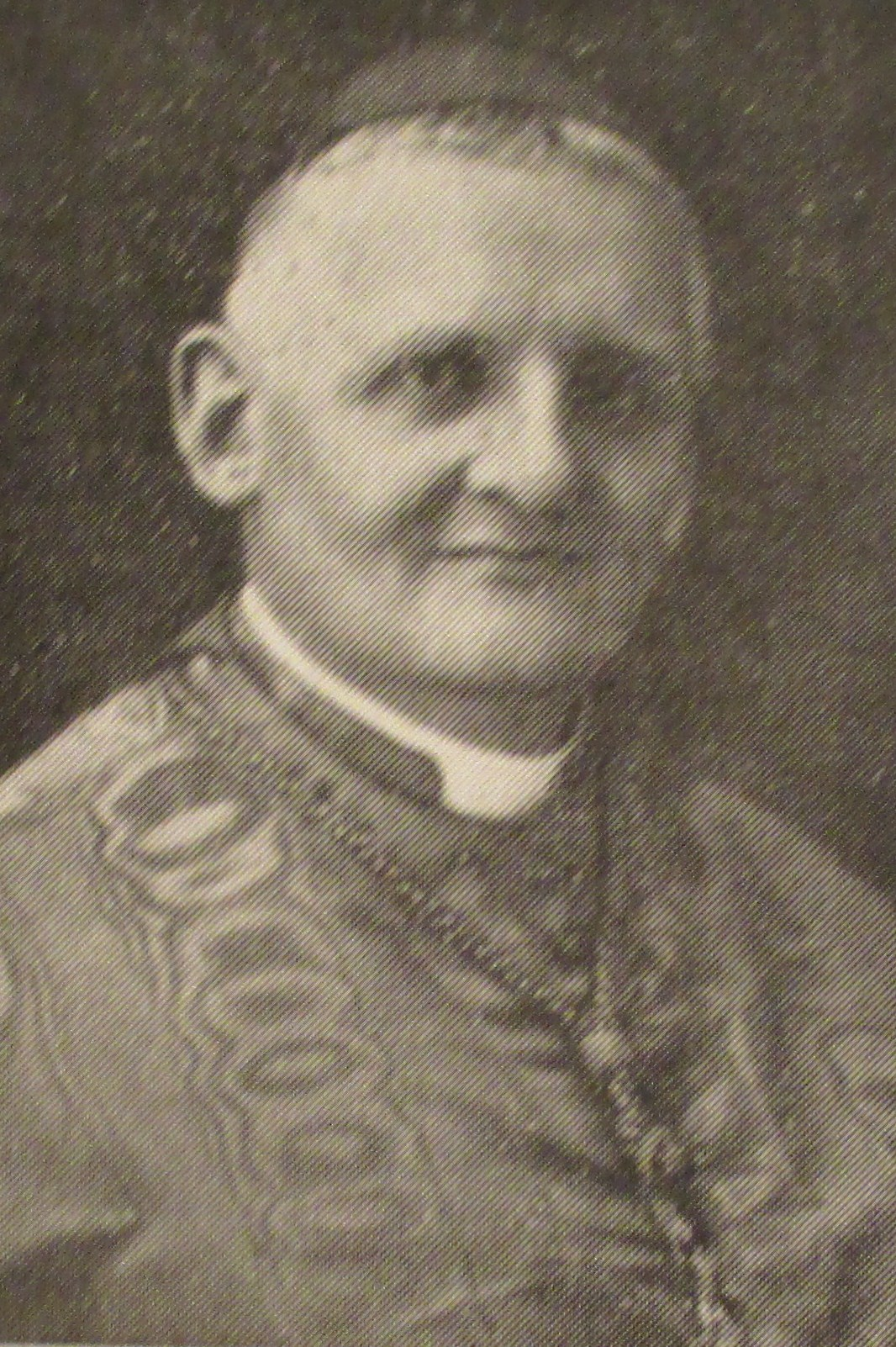
- Church: Roman Catholic
- Archdiocese: Lyon
- Installed: 1937
- Term ended: 17 January 1965
- Predecessor: Louis-Joseph Maurin
- Successor: Jean-Marie Villot
- Other post: Cardinal-Priest of Santissima Trinità al Monte Pincio
- Previous post: Bishop of Tarbes et Lourdes (1929–1937)

Orders
- Ordination: 29 July 1921
- Consecration: 2 July 1929
- Created cardinal: 13 December 1937 by Pius XI
- Rank: Cardinal-Priest

Personal details
- Born: 14 January 1880 Versailles France
- Died: 17 January 1965 (aged 85) Lyon France
- Motto: Ad Jesum per Mariam
- Coat of arms

Styles of Pierre-Marie Gerlier
- Reference style: His Eminence
- Spoken style: Your Eminence
- Informal style: Cardinal
- See: Lyon

Pierre-Marie Gerlier (14 January 1880 – 17 January 1965) was a French Cardinal of the Roman Catholic Church. He served as Archbishop of Lyon from 1937 until his death, was Primate of Gaul and was elevated to the cardinalate in 1937.

== Biography ==
Pierre-Marie Gerlier was born in Versailles, and was a lawyer before deciding to pursue an ecclesiastical career. Indeed, after attending the University of Bordeaux, he studied at the seminary in Issy for late vocations. Gerlier studied at the seminary in Fribourg before serving as an officer of the French Army in World War I, during which he was wounded and captured. Ordained to the priesthood on 29 July 1921, he then did pastoral work in Paris, where he was also the archdiocesan Director of Catholic Works.

On 14 May 1929 Gerlier was appointed Bishop of Tarbes and Lourdes by Pope Pius XI. He received his episcopal consecration on the following 2 July from Cardinal Louis-Ernest Dubois, with Bishops Benjamin Roland-Gosselin and Maurice Dubourg serving as co-consecrators, in Notre Dame Cathedral. Gerlier was named Archbishop of Lyon on 30 July 1937, and was created Cardinal-Priest of Ss. Trinità al Monte Pincio by Pope Pius in the consistory of 13 December that year. As Lyon's archbishop, he held the honorary title of Primate of Gaul. From 1945 to 1948, he served as Vice-President of the French Episcopal Conference.

=== Second World War ===
During World War II, Gerlier condemned Pierre Laval's deportation of Jews to Nazi death camps, the severe conditions of which he also opposed. Moreover, he asked that Roman Catholic religious institutes take Jewish children into hiding. For his efforts to save Jews during World War II he was posthumously awarded the title Righteous among the Nations by Yad Vashem in 1981. However, Gerlier controversially did nothing to prevent the deportation to Auschwitz of the leading French Jew, Jacques Helbronner. On October 28 the Gestapo arrested the president of the Consistoire, who was a personal friend of both Pétain and Gerlier. Vichy was immediately informed and so was Cardinal Gerlier. Helbronner and his wife were deported from Drancy to Auschwitz in transport number 62 that left French territory on November 20 1943. They were gassed on arrival (sometime between October 28 and November 20). Neither the Vichy authorities nor the head of the French Catholic Church intervened in any way. "That Pétain did not intervene is not astonishing, that Gerlier abstained demonstrates that to the very end the leaders of the French church maintained their ambiguous attitude even toward those French Jews who were the closest to them."

=== Post-war ===
He was one of the cardinal electors in the 1939 papal conclave (at which he was considered papabile), which selected Pope Pius XII, and participated again in the 1958 conclave, which resulted in the election of Pope John XXIII. Living long enough to attend only the first three sessions of the Second Vatican Council, Gerlier was also a cardinal elector in the conclave of 1963 that chose Pope Paul VI. On social issues, He championed the Worker-Priest movement and ecumenism, including endorsing the Taizé Community. In 1953, Gerlier described the film Une caprice de Caroline chérie, starring French sex symbol Martine Carol, as "a scandalous display of vice".

He received Édouard Herriot's deathbed conversion to Catholicism in 1957.

In 1965, Gerlier died from a heart attack in Lyon, at the age of 85. He is buried in Lyon Cathedral.

== See also ==
- David Feuerwerker

Catholic Church titles
| Preceded by Alexandre-Philibert Poirier | Bishop of Tarbes and Lourdes; 14 May 1929 – 30 July 1937 | Succeeded by Georges-Eugène-Emile Choquet |
| Preceded by Louis-Joseph Maurin | Archbishop of Lyon; 30 July 1937 – 17 January 1965 | Succeeded by Jean-Marie Villot |
