= Charles-François Turinaz =

French Roman Catholic prelate

- Bishop
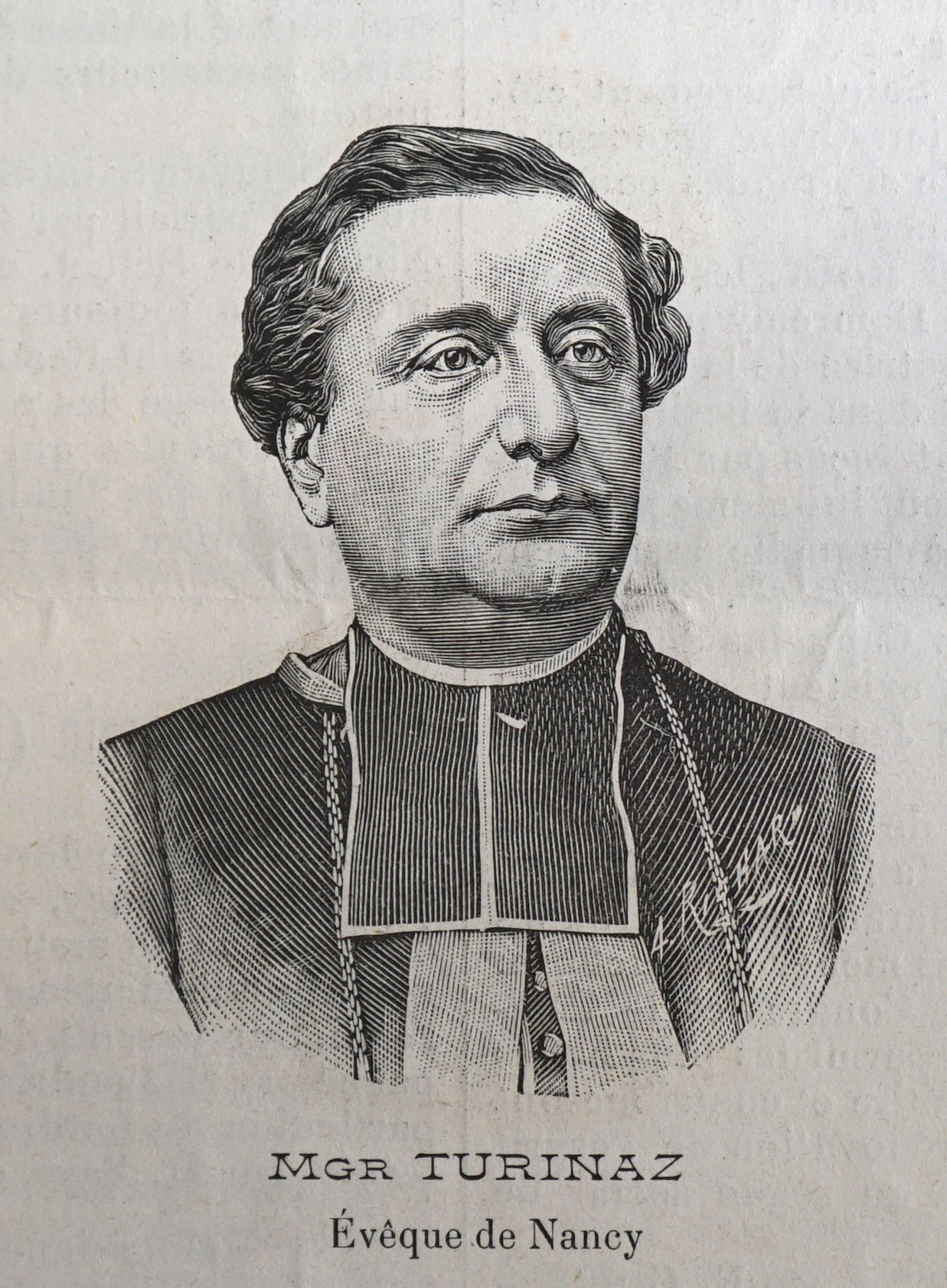
- Church: Roman Catholic Church
- Diocese: Diocese of Nancy-Toul
- Predecessor: Joseph-Alfred Foulon
- Successor: Charles-Joseph-Eugène Ruch
- Other post(s): Titular Archbishop of Antioch in Pisidia
- Previous post(s): Bishop of Tarentaise

Orders
- Ordination: September 20, 1862
- Consecration: January 10, 1873

Personal details
- Born: February 2, 1838; Chambéry, France
- Died: October 19, 1918; Nancy, France
- Motto: "Sursum corda"

Charles-François Turinaz (February 2, 1838 – October 19, 1918) was a French Roman Catholic prelate who served as Bishop of Tarentaise (1873–1882) and later as Bishop of Nancy-Toul (1882–1918). A staunch defender of Catholic rights, he opposed secularist policies in France and played a significant role in promoting social Catholicism.

== Biography ==
=== Early life and education ===
Charles-François Turinaz was born on February 2, 1838, in Chambéry to Théophile Turinaz, an officer who served during the Napoleonic Wars. His family, originally from the Bauges region, later settled in Saint-Genix-sur-Guiers.

He completed his early education at a college in Pont-de-Beauvoisin and then attended the seminary in Moûtiers. In 1859, he went to Rome to further his studies, eventually earning doctorates in theology and canon law.

=== Priestly ministry ===
Turinaz was ordained a priest on September 20, 1862. He served as vicar at Notre-Dame in Chambéry before becoming secretary to Alexis Billiet, Archbishop of Chambéry. In 1863, he was appointed professor of theology and canon law at the seminary in Chambéry.

=== Episcopal ministry ===
Turinaz was consecrated as Bishop of Tarentaise on January 10, 1873, succeeding François Gros. He was later transferred to the Diocese of Nancy-Toul on March 23, 1882, where he served until his death in 1918.

==== Social Catholicism and Opposition to Modernism ====
As bishop, Turinaz opposed France's anti-clerical policies, including the 1905 French law on the Separation of the Churches and the State and the modernist movement. In 1902, he published "Les Périls de la foi et de la discipline" and "Encore quelques mots sur ces Périls" in 1903, warning against threats to Catholic doctrine.

He supported Pope Leo XIII's social encyclical Rerum Novarum but criticized some interpretations of social Catholicism as too aligned with socialism. During his tenure, he oversaw the construction of several churches, including the Bassilicas of the Sacred Heart and Our Lady of Lourdes, both in Nancy.

=== Death and legacy ===
Charles-François Turinaz died in Nancy on October 19, 1918. He is buried in the Basilica in Nancy. Known as a prolific writer, he authored approximately 95 works.
