= Joseph-Alfred Foulon =

French Roman Catholic Cardinal and Archbishop

His Eminence Joseph-Alfred Foulon
- Archbishop of Lyon
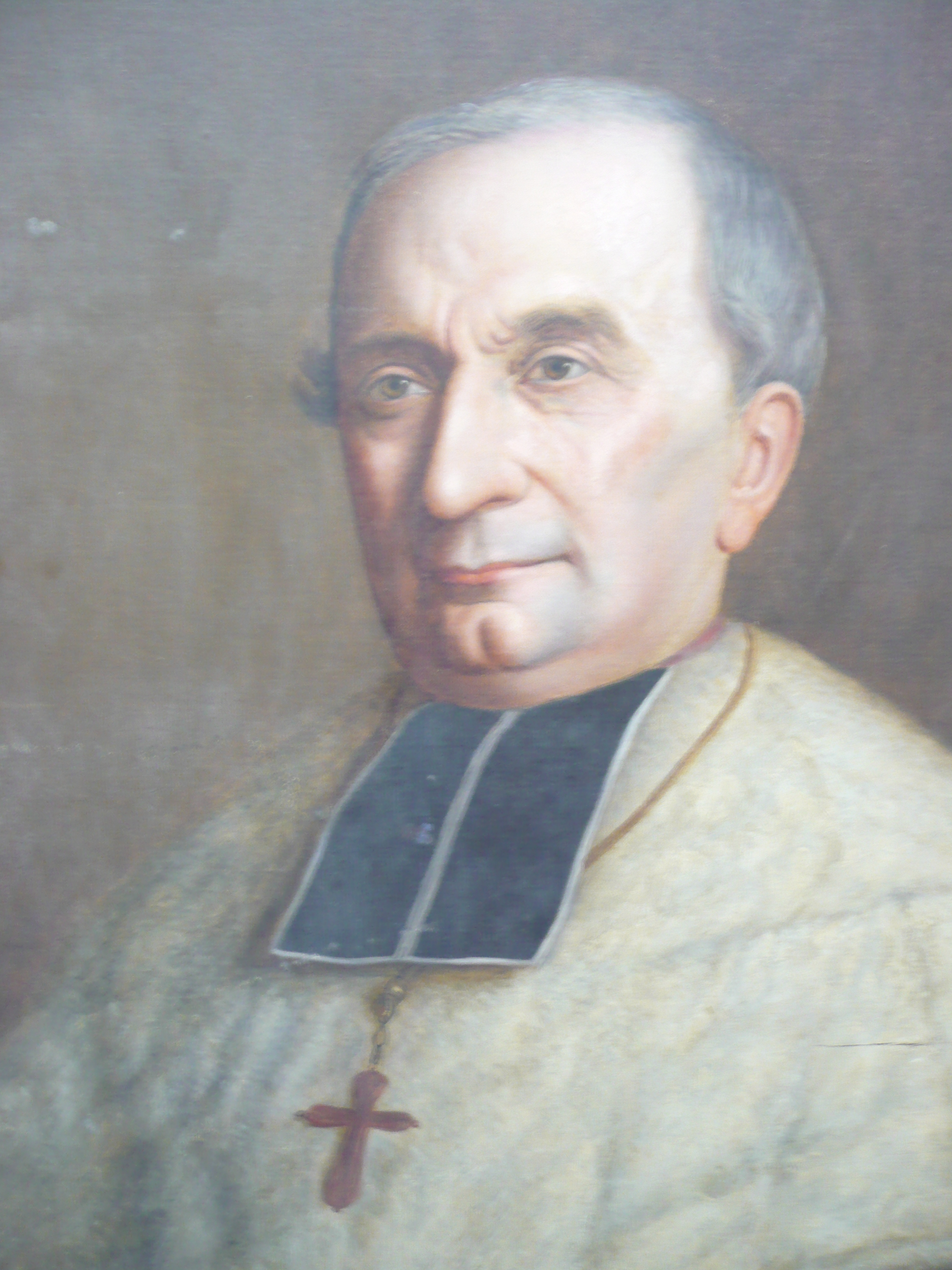
- Church: Roman Catholic Church
- Archdiocese: Lyon
- See: Lyon
- Appointed: 26 May 1887
- Term ended: 23 January 1893
- Predecessor: Louis-Marie-Joseph-Eusèbe Caverot
- Successor: Pierre-Hector Coullie
- Other post: Cardinal-Priest of Sant'Eusebio (1889-93)
- Previous posts: Bishop of Nancy (1867-82); Archbishop of Besançon (1882-87)

Orders
- Ordination: 18 December 1847 by Denis-Auguste Affre
- Consecration: 1 May 1867 by Charles-Martial-Allemand Lavigerie
- Created cardinal: 24 May 1889 by Pope Leo XIII
- Rank: Cardinal-Priest

Personal details
- Born: Joseph-Alfred Foulon; 29 April 1823 Paris, Kingdom of France
- Died: 23 January 1893 (aged 69) Lyon, French Third Republic
- Buried: Lyon Cathedral
- Parents: Pierre Claude Foulon; Josephine Gabrielle Duchamp
- Education: Sorbonne University
- Motto: In multa patientia
- Coat of arms

Joseph-Alfred Foulon (29 April 1823 – 23 January 1893) was a French Roman Catholic Cardinal and Archbishop of Lyon.

== Life ==
Foulon was born in Paris and studied in the Saint-Sulpice Seminary. He was ordained priest on 18 December 1847 in Paris, where he taught for twelve years in the minor seminary.

He was elected bishop of Nancy on 27 March 1867. He took part in the First Vatican Council. He was promoted to the Metropolitan See of Besançon on 30 March 1882, and transferred to the Metropolitan See of Lyon on 26 May 1887. Pope Leo XIII created him Cardinal-Priest in the consistory of 24 May 1889 with the title of Sant'Eusebio.

Cardinal Foulon died on 23 January 1893 in Lyon. His funeral pronouncement was made on 16 March 1893 and he was buried in Lyon Cathedral.

Catholic Church titles
Preceded by Charles-Martial Allemand-Lavigerie	Bishop of Nancy; 27 March 1867 – 30 March 1882	Succeeded by Charles-François Turinaz
Preceded by Pierre-Antoine-Justin Paulinier	Archbishop of Besançon; 30 March 1882 – 26 May 1887	Succeeded by Arthur-Xavier Ducellier
Preceded by Louis-Marie-Joseph-Eusèbe Caverot	Archbishop of Lyon; 26 May 1887 – 23 January 1893	Succeeded by Pierre-Hector Coullie
