= Trinità dei Monti =

- Church of the Most Holy Trinity on the Mounts
- Chiesa della Santissima Trinità dei Monti
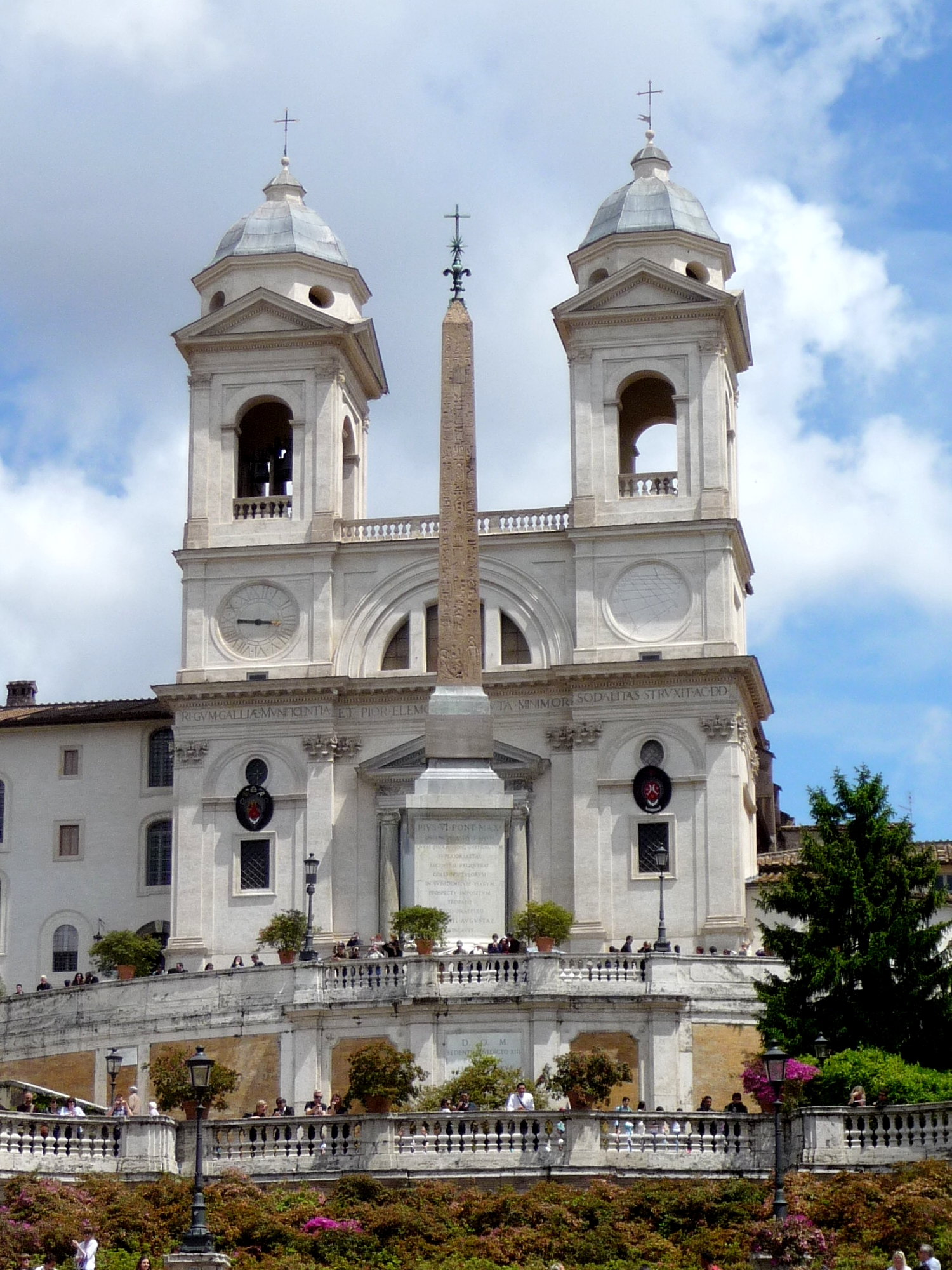
- Façade
- Click on the map to see marker
- 41°54′21″N 12°29′01″E
- Location: Piazza della Trinità dei Monti 3, Rome
- Country: Italy
- Language(s): Italian, French
- Denomination: Catholic
- Tradition: Roman Rite
- Religious order: Emmanuel Community
- Website: trinitadeimonti.net

History
- Status: titular church, national church
- Founded: 1502
- Founder: Louis XII
- Dedication: Holy Trinity
- Consecrated: 1585

Architecture
- Architect(s): Giacomo Della Porta, Annibale Lippi, Carlo Maderno
- Architectural type: Renaissance
- Groundbreaking: 1502

Administration
- Diocese: Rome

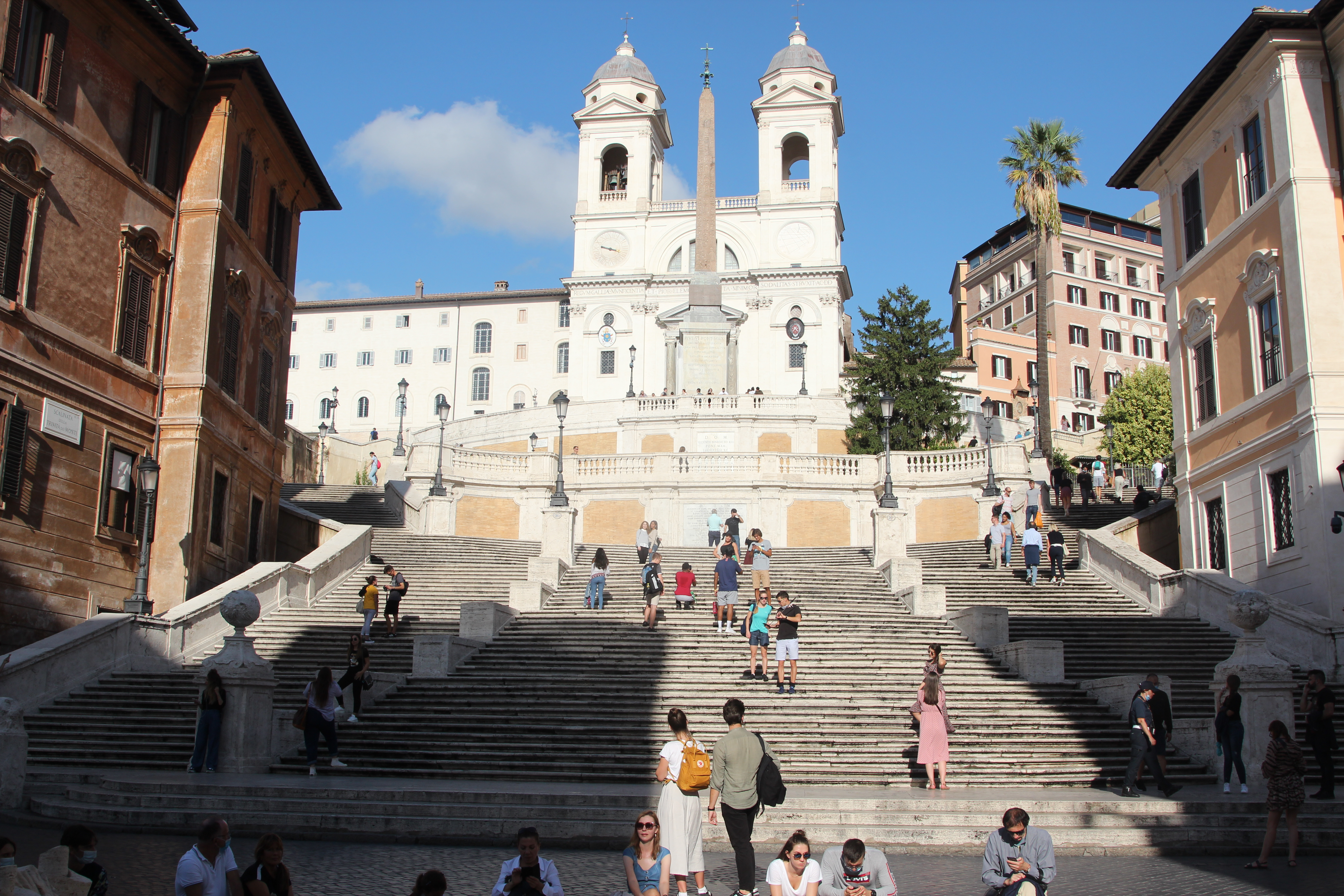
The church and the Spanish Steps from Piazza di Spagna

The Church of Santissima Trinità dei Monti, often called simply Trinità dei Monti (French: La Trinité-des-Monts), is a Roman Catholic late Renaissance titular church, part of a monastery complex in Rome. It is best known for its position above the Spanish Steps which lead down to the famous Piazza di Spagna. The church is entrusted to the Emmanuel Community, and is one of the five Francophone Catholic churches in Rome.

== History ==
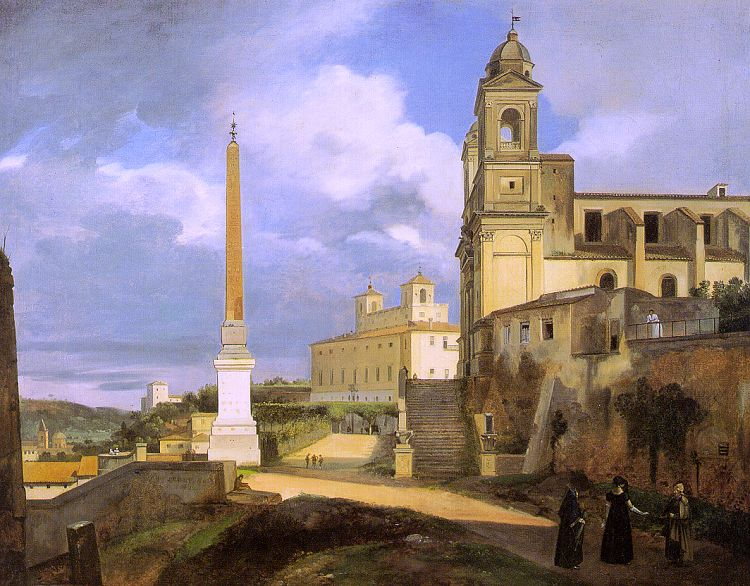
La Trinité-des-Monts et la Villa Médicis, à Rome, painting by François Marius Granet (1808)

In 1494, King Charles VIII of France bought a portion of the ancient Gardens of Lucullus from the papal scholar and former Patriarch of Aquileia, Ermolao Barbaro. He then obtained the authorization from Pope Alexander VI to establish a monastery on this land for the French friars of the Minim Order. He did this in honor of the friars' founder, Francis of Paola, a hermit from Calabria, who had gone to France at the request of his father, King Louis XI to attempt the king's healing. In 1502, Louis XII began construction of the church of the Trinità dei Monti next to this monastery, to celebrate his successful invasion of the Kingdom of Naples. The noted mathematician and physicist, Francois Jacquier, a Minim friar, (1711–1788) was a member of this community for much of his life.

Except for the years of the French Revolution, the church and monastery remained in the possession of the Minim Friars until 1828. At that point, the complex was given to the Religious of the Sacred Heart, a French religious congregation dedicated to the Christian education of young women of higher social status. When the Sisters closed their school in 2006, the complex was given to the Monastic Fraternities of Jerusalem, a new Paris-based monastic Order, till 2016, when the French bishops and government agreed to transfer the property to the newly-founded institute of the Emmanuel Community, part of the charismatic movement.

== Architecture ==
Building work began in a French style with pointed late Gothic arches, but construction lagged. The present Italian Renaissance church was eventually built in its place and finally consecrated in 1585 by the great urbanizer Pope Sixtus V, whose via Sistina connected the Piazza della Trinità dei Monti (outside the church) to the Piazza Barberini across the city. The architect of the façade is not known for certain, but Wolfgang Lotz suggests that it may have originated in a design by Giacomo della Porta (a follower of Michelangelo), who had built the church of Sant'Atanasio dei Greci, which has similarities, a little earlier. The double staircase in front of the church was by Domenico Fontana.

In front of the church stands the Obelisco Sallustiano, one of the many obelisks in Rome, moved here in 1789. It is a Roman obelisk made in imitation of Egyptian ones, originally constructed in the early years of the Roman Empire for the Gardens of Sallust near the Porta Salaria. The hieroglyphic inscription was copied from that on the obelisk in the Piazza del Popolo known as Flaminio Obelisk.

During the Napoleonic occupation of Rome, the church, like many others, was looted of its art and decorations. In 1816, after the Bourbon restoration, the church was restored at the expense of King Louis XVIII.

The inscriptions found in Santissima Trinità dei Monti, a valuable source illustrating the history of the church, have been collected and published by Vincenzo Forcella.

=== Interior ===
In the first chapel to the right is a Baptism of Christ and other scenes of the life of John the Baptist by the Florentine Mannerist painter Giambattista Naldini. In the third chapel on the right is an Assumption of the Virgin by a pupil of Michelangelo, Daniele da Volterra (the last figure on the right is said to be a portrait of Michelangelo). In the fourth chapel, the Cappella Orsini, are scenes of the Passion of Christ by Paris Nogari and the funeral monument of Cardinal Rodolfo Pio da Carpi by Leonardo Sormani. In a chapel near the high altar is a canvas of the Crucifixion painted by Cesare Nebbia.

In the Cappella Pucci, on the left, are frescoes (1537) by Perino del Vaga finished by Federico and Taddeo Zuccari in 1589. The second chapel on the left has a well-known canvas of the Deposition by Daniele da Volterra; flanking it are frescoes by Pablo de Céspedes and Cesare Arbasia. The first chapel on the left has frescoes by Nebbia. In the sacristy anteroom are more frescoes by Taddeo Zuccari: a Coronation of the Virgin, an Annunciation, and a Visitation.

In a niche along a corridor that opens onto the cloister is the fresco (reputed to be miraculous) of the Mater Admirabilis, depicting the Virgin Mary, painted by Pauline Perdreau, a young French girl, in 1844.

=== Monastery ===
The refectory has a frescoed ceiling by Andrea Pozzo. In the cloister there is an astrolabes table, and along a corridor are the anamorphic frescoes (steeply sloping perspectives that have to be viewed from a particular point to make pictorial sense), portraying St John on Patmos and St Francis of Paola as a hermit all by Emmanuel Maignan (1637). An upper room was painted with ruins by Charles-Louis Clérisseau.

== Religious administration ==
The kings of France remained patrons of the church until the French Revolution and the church continued to be the church of the Minim Friars until its partial destruction in 1798.

It has been a titular church since the Titulus Santissimae Trinitatis in Monte Pincio was established by Pope Sixtus V in 1587 and has been held ever since by a French Cardinal. The current (2010) Cardinal Priest is Philippe Barbarin, Archbishop of Lyon and Primate of the Gauls.

By the Diplomatic Conventions of 14 May and 8 September 1828 between the Holy See and the Government of France the church and monastery were entrusted to the 'Religieuses du Sacré-Coeur de Jésus' (Society of the Sacred Heart), a French religious order, for the purpose of educating young girls.

In 2003 the French government were proposing to make funds available for necessary work on the church but was concerned that the Society might find it difficult to continue their work there in the future and in March 2003 the Society decided that it would withdraw from the Trinità no later than the summer of 2006. On 12 July 2005, the Vatican and the French Embassy to the Holy See announced that the Church, Convent and school would be entrusted from 1 September 2006 to the Monastic Fraternities of Jerusalem.

Since 2016 the care of the Trinité des Monts complex has been entrusted to the Emmanuel Community through an agreement by the Holy See and the French Government.

=== List of Cardinal Priests ===
- Charles de Lorraine (1587)
- François de Joyeuse (1587–1594)
- Pierre de Gondi (1594–1616)
- Denis-Simon de Marquemont (1626)
- Alphonse-Louis du Plessis de Richelieu, O.Cart. (1635–1653)
- Antonio Barberini (1653–1655)
- Girolamo Grimaldi-Cavalleroni (1655–1675)
- César d'Estrées (1675–1698)
- Pierre du Cambout (1700–1706)
- Joseph-Emmanuel de La Trémoille (1706–1720)
- Armand Gaston Maximilien de Rohan de Soubise (1721–1749)
- Vacant (1749–1753)
- Clemente Argenvilliers (1753–1758)
- Pietro Girolamo Guglielmi (1759–1773)
- Bernardino Giraud (1773–1782)
- Giovanni de Gregorio (1785–1791)
- Jean-Siffrein Maury (1794–1817)
- Vacant (1817–1823)
- Anne-Antoine-Jules de Clermont-Tonnerre (1823–1830)
- Louis-François de Rohan-Chabot (1831–1833)
- Joachim-Jean-Xavier d'Isoard (1833–1839)
- Louis-Jacques-Maurice de Bonald (1842–1870)
- Vacant (1870–1874)
- René-François Régnier (1874–1881)
- Louis-Marie Caverot (1884–1887)
- Victor-Félix Bernadou (1887–1891)
- Guillaume-René Meignan (1893–1896)
- Jean-Pierre Boyer (1896)
- Pierre-Hector Coullié (1898–1912)
- Hector Sévin (1914–1916)
- Louis-Joseph Maurin (1916–1936)
- Pierre-Marie Gerlier (1937–1965)
- Jean-Marie Villot (1965–1974)
- Alexandre-Charles-Albert-Joseph Renard (1976–1983)
- Albert Decourtray (1985–1994)
- Pierre Étienne Louis Eyt (1994–2001)
- Louis-Marie Billé (2001–2002)
- Philippe Barbarin (2003–)

== See also ==
- Jean-Marie Villot
