= Pierre-Hector Coullié =

French Catholic prelate (1829-1912)

His Eminence Pierre-Hector Coullié
- Cardinal, Archbishop of Lyon
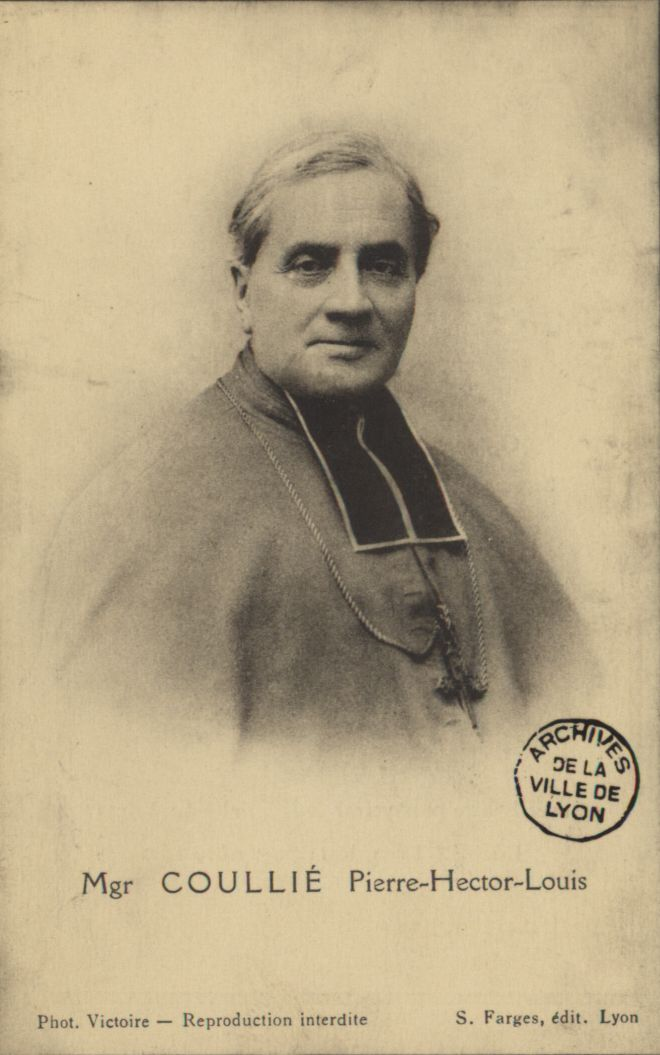
- Church: Catholic Church
- Archdiocese: Lyon
- Appointed: 15 June 1893
- Term ended: 12 September 1912
- Predecessor: Joseph-Alfred Foulon
- Successor: Hector-Irénée Sévin
- Other post: Cardinal-Priest of Santissima Trinità al Monte Pincio (1898–1912)
- Previous posts: Titular Bishop of Sidon (1876–78); Coadjutor Bishop of Orléans (1876–78); Bishop of Orléans (1878–93)

Orders
- Ordination: 23 December 1854
- Consecration: 19 November 1876 by Joseph-Hippolyte Guibert
- Created cardinal: 19 April 1897 by Leo XIII
- Rank: Cardinal-Priest

Personal details
- Born: Pierre-Hector Coullié; 14 March 1829 Paris, French Kingdom
- Died: 12 September 1912 (aged 83) Lyon, French Third Republic
- Buried: Lyon Cathedral
- Parents: Pierre Marie Coullié; Nicole Lepant
- Motto: Obedientia et dilectio
- Coat of arms

Styles of Pierre-Hector Coullié
- Reference style: His Eminence
- Spoken style: Your Eminence
- Informal style: Cardinal
- See: Lyon

Pierre-Hector Coullié (14 March 1829 – 12 September 1912) was a French Catholic prelate who served as Archbishop of Lyon from 1893 to 1912. He was previously Bishop of Orléans from 1878 to 1893 and was made a cardinal in 1897.

== Early life and priesthood ==
Pierre-Hector Coullié was born in Paris, France. He was educated at Saint-Nicolas-des-Champs and the Saint-Sulpice Seminary, Paris.

He was ordained on 23 December 1854. After his ordination he served in the Archdiocese of Paris as professor of its minor seminary; vicar at Ste-Marguerite, St-Eustache, and Notre Dame des Victoires churches from 1854 until 1876.

== Episcopate ==
He was appointed as titular bishop of Sidonia and appointed coadjutor bishop of Orléans on 29 September 1876. He succeeded to the see of Orléans on 11 October 1878. He was promoted to the metropolitan see of Lyon on 15 June 1893.

During the 1896 Congress of the Christian Democrats in Lyon, he spoke against the meeting due to agenda items which he saw as anti-Semitic; the items did not appear in the following year’s Congress.

== Cardinalate ==
He was created Cardinal-Priest in the consistory of April 19, 1897; received red hat and title of SS. Trinità al Monte Pincio, March 24, 1898. He also participated in the conclave of 1903.

Coullié died on September 12, 1912, in Lyon, and is buried in the metropolitan cathedral of Lyon.

Catholic Church titles
Preceded by Joseph-Alfred Foulon	Archbishop of Lyon; 14 June 1893 – 12 September 1912	Succeeded by Hector Sévin
