= Anne Louis Henri de La Fare =

French cardinal and counter-revolutionary

His Eminence Anne-Louis-Henri de la Fare
- Archbishop of Sens
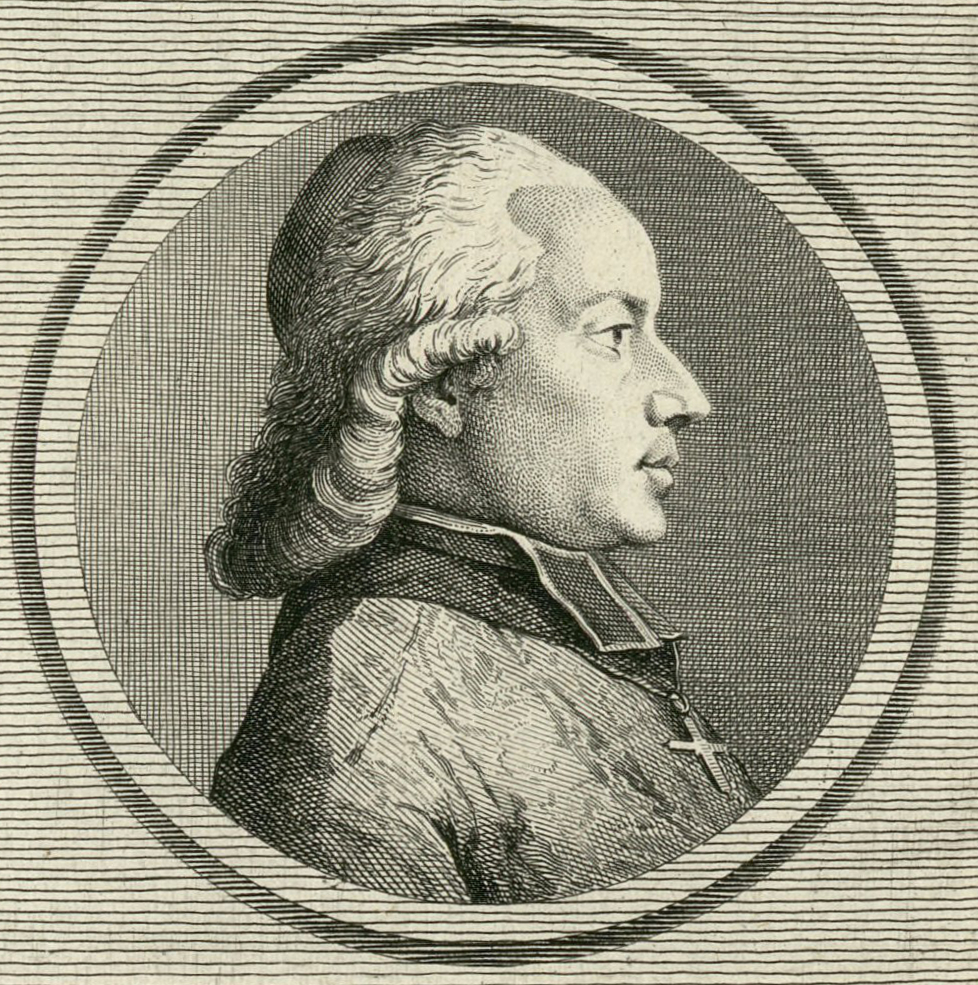
- Church: Roman Catholic Church
- Archdiocese: Sens
- See: Sens
- Appointed: 1 October 1817
- Installed: 31 October 1817
- Term ended: 10 December 1829
- Predecessor: Étienne-Charles de Lómenie de Brienne
- Successor: Charles-André-Toussaint-Bruno de Ramond-Lalande
- Other post: Cardinal-Priest of Santa Maria in Traspontina (1823-29)
- Previous post: Bishop of Nancy (1787-1816)

Orders
- Ordination: 21 September 1776
- Consecration: 13 January 1788 by René des Monstiers de Mérinville
- Created cardinal: 16 May 1823 by Pope Pius VII
- Rank: Cardinal-Priest

Personal details
- Born: Anne-Louis-Henri de La Fare; 8 September 1752 Lesson, Kingdom of France
- Died: 10 December 1829 (aged 77) Paris, French Kingdom
- Buried: Sens Cathedral
- Parents: Louis-Joseph-Dominique de la Fare; Gabrielle-Paule-Henriette Gazeau
- Motto: Lux nostris hostibus ignis
- Coat of arms

Anne-Louis-Henri de La Fare (1752–1829) was a French Roman Catholic cardinal and counter-revolutionary.

== Biography ==
He was born in Bessay on September 8, 1752 into a family of ancient nobility. He was the third of seven children born to Joseph Louis Dominique de La Fare and Gabrielle Gazeau de Champagné. He was a great-nephew of Cardinal François-Joachim de Pierre de Bernis.

Serving as Bishop of Nancy from 1787, he was called upon to celebrate the solemn mass for the opening of the Estates-General of 1789 (as a deputy for the clergy; his sermon on that occasion became famous, although the actual text was only published in 1816). He showed support for a series of moderate reforms in France, authoring the first draft of a "Declaration of the Rights of Man" (which was later distorted by the revolutionaries in an anti-Christian direction and subsequently condemned by Pope Pius VI). Due to the radicalism of the revolutionary changes, including the Civil Constitution of the Clergy, he was forced to leave France in 1791, only to be exiled by the new government and effectively replaced by a schismatic constitutional bishop. He initially took refuge in Germany with Clement Wenceslaus of Saxony, uncle of Louis XVI and Archbishop of Trier (and thus also sovereign of the Electorate of Trier), before moving to Bavaria and Austria, where he later acted as a sort of unofficial "ambassador" for Louis XVIII (titular king from 1795) in Vienna while the sovereign was exiled in England. The bishop remained in Vienna until 1814.

He was subsequently among those bishops known as "anti-concordatarians" because they opposed the Concordat of 1801 and refused to resign as requested by Pope Pius VII to allow for the appointment of a bishop chosen by Napoleon, then First Consul, under the concordat itself. Nevertheless, the Pope appointed another bishop for his diocese in 1802.

He returned to France only after the fall of the Napoleonic regime and agreed to resign in 1816 at the request of Louis XVIII, as did all the other anti-concordatarian bishops (except for the Bishop of Blois, Thémines, who was forced to remain in exile). In 1817 he was called to head the Archdiocese of Sens, restored following a new concordat that was not ratified by the French parliament and therefore only effectively re-established in 1822.

In 1822 he was elevated to the rank of Duke and Peer of France, becoming a member of the upper house of the French parliament. Pope Pius VII elevated him to the rank of cardinal in the consistory of May 16, 1823, and he participated in the conclave of that same year which elected Pope Leo XII, as well as the 1829 conclave (election of Pius VIII).

In 1825 he was tasked with delivering the sermon at the coronation of Charles X of France and drafting the proposal for a new academy of theological studies linked to the College of Sorbonne.

He died on December 10, 1829 at the age of 77.
