= Simandre =

- Commune
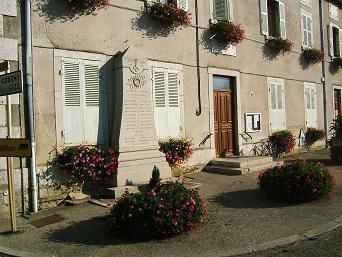
- Town hall
- Location of Simandre
- Location within France Location within Bourgogne-Franche-Comté
- Coordinates: 46°37′26″N 4°59′21″E
- Country: France
- Region: Bourgogne-Franche-Comté
- Department: Saône-et-Loire
- Arrondissement: Louhans
- Canton: Cuiseaux
- Area^{1}: 22.79 km^{2} (8.80 sq mi)
- Elevation: 208 m (682 ft)
- Highest elevation: 216 m (709 ft)
- Lowest elevation: 169 m (554 ft)
- Population (2023): 1,750
  - Density: 76.8/km^{2} (199/sq mi)
- Time zone: UTC+01:00 (CET)
  - Summer (DST): UTC+02:00 (CEST)
- INSEE/Postal code: 71522 /71290
- ^{1} French Land Register data, which excludes lakes, ponds, glaciers > 1 km^{2} (0.386 sq mi or 247 acres) and river estuaries.

Simandre (French pronunciation: [simɑ̃dʁ]) is a commune in the Saône-et-Loire department in the region of Bourgogne-Franche-Comté in eastern France.

== See also ==
- Communes of the Saône-et-Loire department
