= Diocese of Nancy =

Catholic diocese in France

Coordinates: 48°41′29″N 6°11′11″E

Diocese of Nancy and Toul Dioecesis Nanceiensis et Tullensis Diocèse de Nancy et de Toul

Catholic
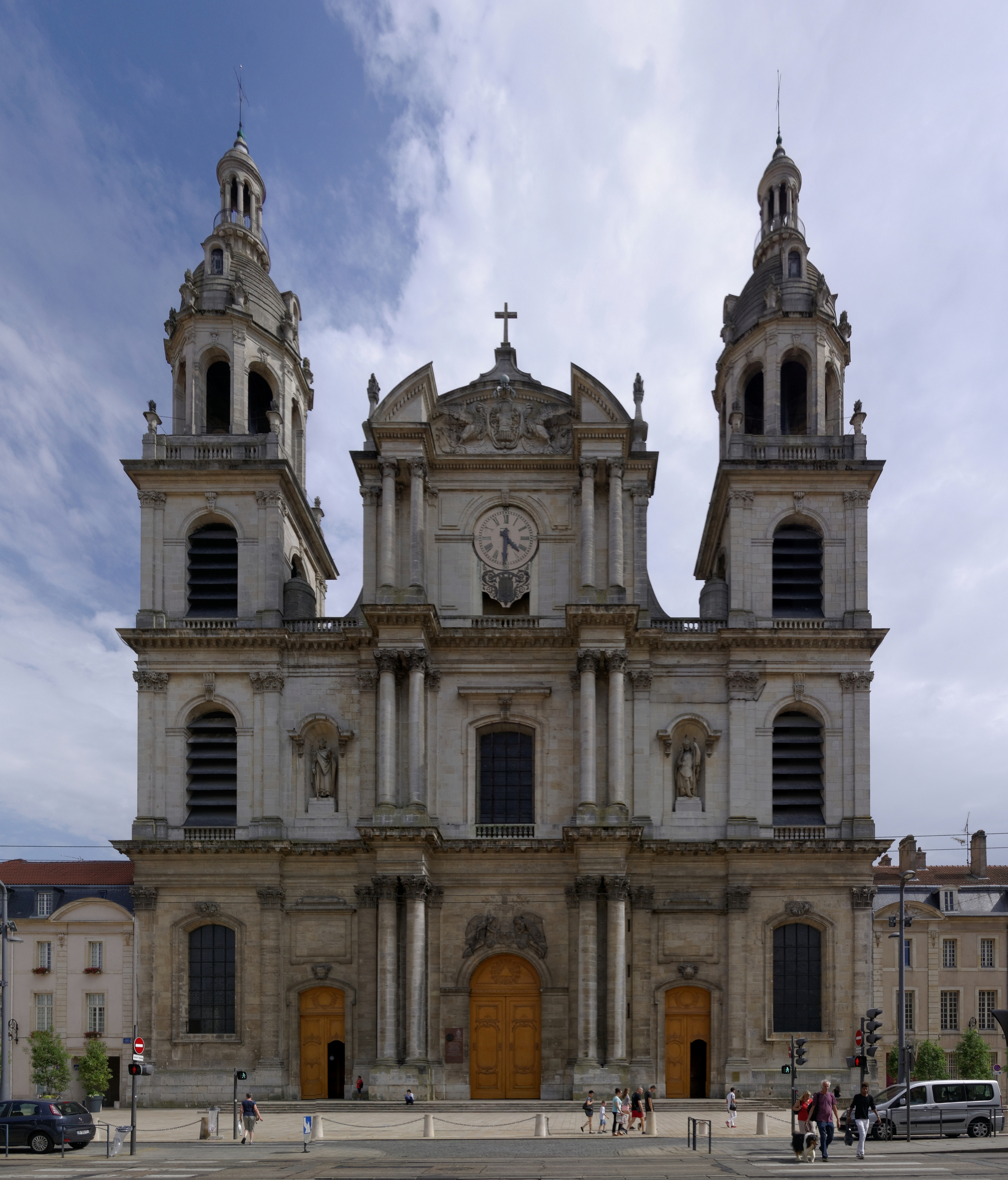
- Nancy Cathedral

Location
- Country: France
- Ecclesiastical province: Besançon
- Metropolitan: Archdiocese of Besançon

Statistics
- Area: 5,275 km^{2} (2,037 sq mi)
- Population: Total; Catholics: (as of 2021); 734,400 (est.) ▲; 667,800 (est.) ▲
- Parishes: 55

Information
- Denomination: Catholic Church
- Sui iuris church: Latin Church
- Rite: Roman Rite
- Established: United: 20 February 1824
- Cathedral: Cathedral of Notre-Dame-de-l'Annonciation in Nancy
- Patron saint: The Blessed Virgin Mary Assumed in Heaven
- Secular priests: 124 (diocesan) ▼15 (Religious Orders) ▼28 Permanent Deacons ▲

Current leadership
- Pope: Leo XIV
- Bishop: Pierre-Yves Michel
- Metropolitan Archbishop: Jean-Luc Bouilleret
- Bishops emeritus: Jean-Louis Papin

Map

Website
- Website of the Diocese

The Diocese of Nancy and Toul (Latin: Dioecesis Nanceiensis et Tullensis; French: Diocèse de Nancy et de Toul) is a Latin Church ecclesiastical territory or diocese of the Catholic Church in France. After a considerable political struggle between Louis XV, Louis XVI, and the Dukes of Lorraine, the diocese was erected by Pope Pius VI on 17 December 1777. The Diocese of Nancy is a suffragan diocese in the ecclesiastical province of the metropolitan Archdiocese of Besançon.

== History ==
The title of count and the rights of sovereignty of the medieval Bishops of Toul originated in certain grants which Henry the Fowler gave St. Gauzelin in 927. During the Conflict of Investitures in 1108, the chapter became divided: the majority elected Riquin of Commercy as bishop; the minority chose Conrad of Schwarzenburg. Henry V granted Conrad the title of bishop, with the stipulation that he did not exercise episcopal office.

In 1271 grave differences broke out again in the chapter of Toul Cathedral. In 1278 Pope Nicholas III personally appointed Conrad of Tübingen as bishop. Thereafter, it was generally the Holy See which appointed the bishops, alleging various reasons as vacancies arose. As a result, many Italian prelates held this important see until 1552, when Toul was occupied by France. In 1597 Charles III, duke of Lorraine asked Pope Clement VIII for the dismemberment of the See of Toul and the creation of a see at Nancy; this failed through the opposition of Arnaud d'Ossat, Henry's ambassador at Rome. In the end, Clement VIII decided that Nancy was to have a primatial church and that its prelate would have the title of Primate of Lorraine and wear episcopal insignia, but should not exercise episcopal jurisdiction.

In 1648 according to the Treaty of Westphalia the bishoprics of Metz, Toul and Verdun (all belonging to the Holy Roman Empire) became French cities. The duchy of Lothringen, surrounded by French territories and repeatedly occupied by French troops, finally fell to the French, and Lorraine became a French province. The population of Toul was around 10,000 persons in 1688. After the French Revolution of 1789 France was divided into departments—Lorraine consisted of the departments of Meurthe, Meuse, Moselle and Vosges. Nancy, Verdun, Metz and Epinal became the capitals of these departments.

In 1688, the Cathedral of Toul had a Chapter with ten dignities and forty Canons. In the city of Toul there were seven parishes, seven houses of male religious and four monasteries of monks. The diocese had around 200 parishes.

In 1777, the Cathedral of Nancy had a Chapter in which there were three dignities and twenty-four Canons. In the city of 30,000 persons there were 7 parishes, twelve houses of male religious, and ten monasteries of monks. All cathedral chapters in France were abolished in 1790 by the Constituent Assembly.

In 1777 and 1778 Toul lost territories out of which were formed two new dioceses: one in Saint-Die and the other in Nancy, both of them suffragans of Trier. The Concordat of 1802, suppressing the diocese of Toul, made Nancy the seat of a vast diocese which included three Departments: Meurthe, Meuse, and Vosges.

=== Revolution ===
The diocese of Nancy was abolished during the French Revolution by the Legislative Assembly, under the Civil Constitution of the Clergy (1790). Its territory was subsumed into the new diocese, called 'Meurthe', which was part of the Metropolitanate called the 'Metropole du Nord-Est' (which included seven new 'départements' and dioceses). The Civil Constitution mandated that bishops be elected by the citizens of each 'département', which immediately raised the most severe canonical questions, since the electors did not need to be Catholics and the approval of the Pope was not only not required, but actually forbidden. Erection of new dioceses and transfer of bishops, moreover, was not in the competence of civil authorities or of the Church in France. The result was schism between the 'Constitutional Church' and the Catholic Church. The legitimate bishop of Nancy, Anne Louis Henri de La Fare, refused to take the oath, and therefore the episcopal seat was declared vacant.

On 13 March 1791 the electors of Meurthe were assembled, and elected the Lazarist P.-F. Chatelain, a Professor at the Seminary in Toul. After some considerable consideration, he refused the election. The electors therefore returned to their deliberations, and, on the recommendation of the Ecclesiastical Committee of the National Assembly, on 8 May 1791 chose the Oratorian Luc-François Lalande of Saint-Lô, a theologian and student of Hebrew. He was consecrated a bishop at Notre Dame in Paris on 29 May by Jean-Baptiste Gobel, the titular Bishop of Lydda, who had been installed as Constitutional Bishop of Paris. On 3 June he made his official entry into Nancy, where he began a war of pamphlets with Bishop de la Fare, who was in exile in Trier. In September 1792 Lalande was elected a delegate to the Convention, where, on 7 November, he renounced his functions. In 1795 he became a member of the Council of 500. In 1801 he wrote a letter of submission to Pope Pius VII. At the end of 1799, an assembly of Constitutional priests elected Francois Nicolas of Epinal as a successor to Lalande.

=== Afterward ===
Nicolas, and all the Constitutional Bishops, were required to resign in May 1801 by First Consul Bonaparte, who was negotiating a treaty with Pope Pius VII, the Concordat of 1801 (15 July 1801). Nicolas never recanted. Once the Concordat went into effect, Pius VII was able to issue the appropriate bulls to restore many of the dioceses and to regulate their boundaries, most of which corresponded closely to the new 'départements'. The Concordat of 1802, suppressing Toul, made Nancy the seat of a vast diocese which included three Departments: Meurthe, Meuse, and Vosges.

In a Bull of 6 October 1822, Pope Pius VII re-established the Dioceses of Verdun and Saint-Dié, detaching from the diocese of Nancy the departments of Meuse and Vosges. Since 1824 the bishops of Nancy have borne the title of Bishops of Nancy and Toul, since nearly all of the territory of the ancient Diocese of Toul is united with that of Nancy.

== Bishops ==
- 1777–1783 : Louis-Apolinaire de La Tour du Goupille-Montauban
- 1783–1787 : François de Fontanges
- 1787–1816 : Anne Louis Henri de La Fare
- 1802–1823 : Antoine Eustache d'Osmond
- 1823–1844 : Charles-Auguste-Marie-Joseph de Forbin-Janson
- 1844–1859 : Alexis-Basile-Alexandre Menjaud
- 1859–1863 : Georges Darboy
- 1863–1867 : Charles-Martial d'Allemand-Lavigerie
- 1867–1882 : Joseph-Alfred Foulon
- 1882–1918 : Charles-François Turinaz
- 1918–1919 : Charles-Joseph-Eugène Ruch
- 1919–1930 : Hippolyte-Marie de La Celle
- 1930–1934 : Etienne-Joseph Hurault
- 1934–1949 : Fleury de Marcel
- 1949–1956 : Marc-Armand Lallier, also archbishop of Marseille
- 1957–1971 : Emile-Charles-Raymond Pirolley
- 1972–1991 : Jean Albert Marie Auguste Bernard
- 1991–1998 : Jean-Paul Maurice Jaeger
- 1999–2023 : Jean-Louis Papin
- 2023–present : Pierre-Yves Michel

== See also ==
- Catholic Church in France
