= Carlo Laurenzi =

Italian Cardinal

His Eminence Carlo Laurenzi
- Prefect Emeritus of the Congregation for Rites
- Church: Roman Catholic Church
- Appointed: 14 March 1889
- Term ended: 3 October 1889
- Predecessor: Angelo Bianchi
- Successor: Gaetano Aloisi Masella
- Other post: Cardinal-Priest of Sant'Anastasia (1884-93)
- Previous posts: Titular Bishop of Amathus in Palæstina (1877-79); Auxiliary Bishop of Perugia (1877-84); Camerlengo of the College of Cardinals (1889)

Orders
- Ordination: 23 September 1843
- Consecration: 24 June 1877 by Gioacchino Pecci
- Created cardinal: 13 December 1880 ("in pectore"); 10 November 1884 (revealed) by Pope Leo XIII
- Rank: Cardinal-Priest

Personal details
- Born: Carlo Laurenzi; 12 January 1821 Perugia, Papal States
- Died: 2 November 1893 (aged 72) Rome, Kingdom of Italy
- Buried: Campo Verano
- Parents: Francesco Laurenzi; Geltrude Mezzanotte
- Education: University of Perugia
- Coat of arms

Styles of Carlo Laurenzi
- Reference style: His Eminence
- Spoken style: Your Eminence
- Informal style: Cardinal
- See: none

Carlo Laurenzi (12 January 1821 – 2 November 1893) was an Italian Cardinal of the Roman Catholic Church who served as Prefect of the Sacred Congregation of Rites from 1889 until his death, and was elevated to the cardinalate in 1884.

== Biography ==
Carlo Laurenzi was born in Perugia, and studied at the University of Perugia, from where he obtained his doctorates in theology (1 December 1843) and in canon and civil law (17 January 1845).

He was ordained to the priesthood on 23 September 1843, and finished his studies in 1845. Laurenzi was later made a canon of the cathedral chapter of Perugia in June 1846, the pro-vicar general of Perugia in February 1847, and a Privy Chamberlain supernumerary of His Holiness in 1853. He also served as President of the Theological College at his alma mater of the University of Perugia, and became a canon archpriest in 1857.

On 22 June 1877, Laurenzi was appointed Auxiliary Bishop of Perugia and Titular Bishop of Amathus in Palaestina by Pope Pius IX, receiving his episcopal consecration from Cardinal Gioacchino Pecci, the future Pope Leo XIII. He was later named an Assistant at the Pontifical Throne on 13 March 1878, Auditor Sanctissimi on 15 May 1879, and Assessor of the Sacred Congregation of the Supreme Roman and Universal Inquisition on 30 March 1882.

Pope Leo secretly (in pectore) elevated him to the College of Cardinals in the consistory of 13 December 1880, eventually publishing him as cardinal priest of Basilica di Sant'Anastasia al Palatino on 10 November 1884. Laurenzi was appointed Secretary of Memorials of His Holiness on 25 April 1885, and served as Camerlengo of the Sacred College of Cardinals from 11 February to 30 December 1889. On 14 March of that same year, he was made prefect of the Sacred Congregation of Rites.

Laurenzi died in Rome, at age 74. He lay in state in his cardinalatial church before being buried at the chapel of the Congregation for the Propagation of the Faith in the Campo Verano cemetery.

Catholic Church titles
Preceded by Luigi Oreglia di Santo Stefano	Cardinal Priest of Santa Anastasia; 1884–1893	Succeeded by Andrea Carlo Ferrari
Preceded by Angelo Bianchi	Prefect of the Congregation for Rites; 1889	Succeeded by Camillo Mazzella, SJ
Preceded by Lucido Parocchi	Camerlengo of the Sacred College of Cardinals; 1889	Succeeded by Paul Melchers
