= Congregation for Indulgences and Sacred Relics =

The Congregation for Indulgences and Sacred Relics (Latin: Congregatio indulgentiarum et sacrarum reliquiarum) was a body of the Roman Curia, created in 1669 and suppressed in 1904.

== History ==
Pope Clement IX established the Congregation for Indulgences and Sacred Relics in his apostolic letter In ipsis pontificatus nostra primordiis on 6 July 1669, giving permanent form to a commission of cardinals created on 4 August 1667. Initially the Congregation had a purely disciplinary character overseeing the application and observance of the Council of Trent's decree De indulgentiis issued on 3-4 December 1563 and limiting the abuses introduced in the distribution of indulgences by the Secretariat of the Briefs.

The Congregation also managed the authentication of relics, particularly when disputes were addressed in legal proceedings. The Congregation had its own staff of theologians and archaeologists, mostly Jesuits or Capuchins, to help resolve complex questions.

At the beginning of the eighteenth century, the Congregation began to distribute indulgences itself, a privilege that was recognized by Pope Benedict XIV in 1742. Conflicts of jurisdiction and rival interests arose between the Congregation and the Secretariat of the Briefs until Pope Pius IX, with his motu proprio Fidelis domus Domini of 2 January 1855, deprived the Congregation of the rights Benedict XIV had granted it. Pius IX's instructions were reiterated with greater force by Pope Leo XIII in the motu proprio Christianae reipublicae of 31 October 1897.

On 28 January 1904, with the motu proprio Quae in Ecclesiae, Pope Pius X united the Congregation with the Congregation of Rites, and on that same day he made Cardinal Luigi Tripepi, who had been Prefect of the Congregation of Indulgences and Sacred Relics since 7 January 1903, also the Pro-Prefect of the Congregation of Rites.

On 29 June 1908, with the apostolic constitution Sapienti consilio, Pius X suppressed the Congregation and transferred its responsibilities for indulgences to the Holy Office. Finally, Pope Benedict XV on 25 March 1917, with the motu proprio Alloquentes proxime, assigned those responsibilities to the Apostolic Penitentiary.

== Prefects ==
- Lodovico Pico della Mirandola (10 September 1724 – 10 August 1743)
- Raffaele Cosimo de' Girolami (23 September 1743 – 21 February 1748)
- Joaquín Fernández Portocarrero (? – 22 June 1760)
- Nicolò Maria Antonelli (1760 – 25 September 1767)
- Ludovico Calini (October 1767 – 9 December 1782)
- Antonio Eugenio Visconti (1782 – 4 March 1788)
- Diego Innico Caracciolo di Martina (1808? – 14 December 1818)
- Giorgio Doria Pamfilj Landi (1822 – 16 November 1837)
- Antonio Maria Frosini (1 October 1826 – 8 July 1834)
- Castruccio Castracane degli Antelminelli (11 December 1834 – 7 October 1837)
- Gabriele Ferretti (14 March 1843 – 17 July 1847)
- Charles Januarius Acton (22 December 1846 – 23 June 1847)
- Fabio Maria Asquini (2 May 1847 – 8 May 1863)
- Antonio Maria Panebianco, OFMConv (23 April 1863 – 17 January 1867)
- Giuseppe Andrea Bizzarri (17 January 1867 – 31 August 1872)
- Lorenzo Barili (6 September 1872 – 8 March 1875)
- Innocenzo Ferrieri (31 March 1875 – 6 July 1876)
- Luigi Maria Bilio, B. (12 July 1876 – 20 December 1876)
- Luigi Oreglia di Santo Stefano (23 December 1876 – 27 March 1882)
- Johann Baptist Franzelin, SJ (1885.03.28 – 1886.12.11)
- Tommaso Maria Zigliara, OP (16 December 1886 – 28 October 1887)
- Gaetano Aloisi Masella (16 November 1887 – 3 October 1889)
- Serafino Vannutelli (13 February 1888 – 14 March 1889)
- Carlo Cristofori (14 March 1889 – 30 January 1891)
- Giuseppe d'Annibale (22 June 1890 – 17 July 1892)
- Luigi Sepiacci, OESA (1 August 1892 – 26 April 1893)
- Ignazio Persico, OFMCap (30 May 1893 – 7 December 1895)
- Andreas Steinhuber, SJ (12 December 1895 – 1 October 1896)
- Girolamo Maria Gotti, OCD (1 December 1896 – 20 November 1899)
- Domenico Ferrata (20 November 1899 – 23 October 1900)
- Serafino Cretoni (23 October 1900 – 7 January 1903)
- Luigi Tripepi (7 January 1903 – 28 January 1904)
