= Serafino Cretoni =

Italian Cardinal (1833–1909)

His Eminence Serafino Cretoni
- Prefect of the Congregation for Rites
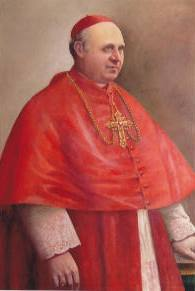
- Church: Roman Catholic Church
- Appointed: 7 January 1903
- Term ended: 3 February 1909
- Predecessor: Domenico Ferrata
- Successor: Sebastiano Martinelli
- Other post: Cardinal-Priest of Santa Maria sopra Minerva (1896-1909)
- Previous posts: Titular Archbishop of Damascus (1893-96); Apostolic Nuncio to Spain (1893-96); Camerlengo of the College of Cardinals (1900-01); Prefect of the Congregation of Indulgences and Sacred Relics (1900-03)

Orders
- Ordination: 1857
- Consecration: 5 February 1893 by Raffaele Monaco La Valletta
- Created cardinal: 22 June 1896 by Pope Leo XIII
- Rank: Cardinal-Priest

Personal details
- Born: Serafino Cretoni; 4 September 1833 Soriano, Viterbo, Papal States
- Died: 3 February 1909 (aged 75) Rome, Kingdom of Italy
- Buried: Campo Verano
- Parents: Giacomo Cretoni; Firmina Trabattoni
- Education: La Sapienza University; Pontifical Roman Athenaeum Saint Apollinare
- Coat of arms: Serafino Cretoni's coat of arms

Styles of Serafino Cretoni
- Reference style: His Eminence
- Spoken style: Your Eminence
- Informal style: Cardinal
- See: none

Serafino Cretoni (4 September 1833 – 3 February 1909) was an Italian cardinal of the Roman Catholic Church. He served as Prefect of the Sacred Congregation of Rites from 1903 until his death, and was elevated to the cardinalate in 1896.

== Biography ==
Serafino Cretoni was born in Soriano, and studied at the Pontifical Roman Athenaeum S. Apollinare, where he obtained his doctorate in theology. He also studied and was fluent in English, French, Greek, and Spanish. Ordained to the priesthood in 1857, Cretoni then taught philosophy at the Pontifical Urban Athenaeum of Propaganda Fide in Rome. He also served as Vice-Substitute of the Vatican Secretariat of State, and as Secretary of the commission for Oriental affairs at the First Vatican Council (1869–1870).

Cretoni was named a canon of the Liberian Basilica and of St. Peter's Basilica before becoming Archivist of the Sacred Congregation for the Propagation of the Faith. In 1877, he was sent by Pope Pius IX to attend the general chapter of the Armenian Mechitarists in Venice. Cretoni was raised to the rank of Domestic Prelate of His Holiness on 21 May 1878, and made Undersecretary of State on 19 September 1879. He went on to become Secretary of the Sacred Congregation for the Propagation of the Faith, in the section of Oriental rites, on 16 November 1880 and Assessor of the Supreme Sacred Congregation of the Holy Office in 1889.

On 16 January 1893, Simeoni was appointed Titular Archbishop of Damascus by Pope Leo XIII, receiving his episcopal consecration on the following 5 February from Cardinal Raffaele Monaco La Valletta. Simeoni was named Nuncio to Spain on 9 May that year, and created Cardinal Priest of Santa Maria sopra Minerva by Pope Leo in the consistory of 22 June 1896.

From 19 April 1900 to 15 April 1901, he served as Camerlengo of the Sacred College of Cardinals. He was appointed Prefect of the Congregation for Indulgences and Sacred Relics on 23 October 1900 and of the Sacred Congregation of Rites on 7 January 1903. He also participated in the papal conclave of 1903, which selected Pope Pius X.

Cardinal Cretoni died in Rome at the age of 75. After lying in state in the church of San Carlo ai Catinari, he was buried at the Campo Verano cemetery.

Catholic Church titles
| Preceded by Angelo Di Pietro | Nuncio to Spain; 1893–1900 | Succeeded by Giuseppe Francica-Nava di Bontifé |
| Preceded by Domenico Ferrata | Camerlengo of the Sacred College of Cardinals; 1900–1901 | Succeeded by Giovanni Casali del Drago |
| Preceded by Domenico Ferrata | Prefect of the Sacred Congregation of Rites; 1903–1909 | Succeeded by Luigi Tripepi |
