= Sebastiano Martinelli =

Italian cardinal

His Eminence Sebastiano Martinelli, O.E.S.A.
- Prefect of the Congregation for Rites
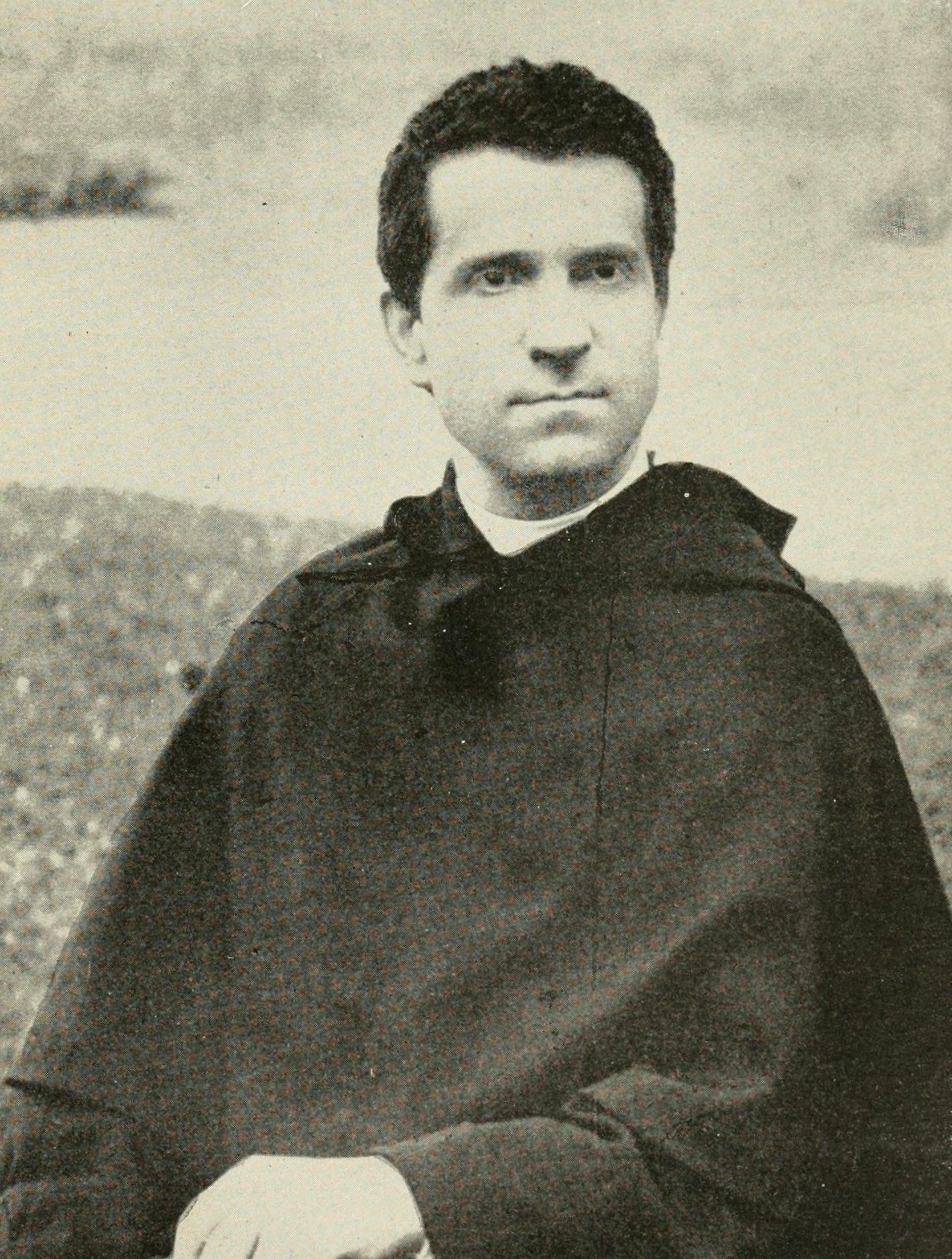
- Church: Catholic Church
- Appointed: 8 February 1909
- Term ended: 4 July 1918
- Predecessor: Serafino Cretoni
- Successor: Antonio Vico
- Other post: Cardinal-Priest of Sant'Agostino (1902-18)
- Previous posts: Prior General of the Hermits of Saint Augustine (1889-98); Apostolic Delegate to the United States (1896-1902); Titular Archbishop of Ephesus (1896-1901); Camerlengo of the College of Cardinals (1907-09)

Orders
- Ordination: 4 March 1871 by Pietro de Villanova Castellacci
- Consecration: 30 August 1896 by Mariano Rampolla del Tindaro
- Created cardinal: 15 April 1901 by Pope Leo XIII
- Rank: Cardinal-Priest

Personal details
- Born: 20 August 1848 Borgo Sant'Anna, Lucca, Grand Duchy of Tuscany
- Died: 4 July 1918 (aged 69) Sant'Anna, Rome, Kingdom of Italy
- Buried: Campo Verano, Rome, Italy
- Parents: Cosma Martinelli; Maddalena Pardini

Sebastiano Martinelli, O.E.S.A. (20 August 1848 – 4 July 1918) was an Italian Augustinian friar and cardinal of the Catholic Church who served as Prefect of the Congregation of Rites.

== Early life ==
Sebastiano Martinelli was born in Borgo Sant'Anna within the Archdiocese of Lucca, Italy. He was the son of Cosma Martinelli and Maddalena Pardini. His brother was Cardinal Tommaso Martinelli. He studied in the San Michele Seminary in Lucca and later the Collegio Sant'Agostino in Rome. He joined the Order of the Hermits of Saint Augustine (Augustinians) on 6 December 1863 and was professed on 6 January 1865.

== Ecclesiastical career ==
=== Priesthood ===
He was ordained on 4 March 1871 in Rome. He served as a professor of theology at the Santa Maria in Posterula College, Rome. He was named postulator causarum servorum Dei of the Augustinian Order in 1881. He became prior general of his Order in 1889 and was reelected in 1895.

=== Episcopate ===
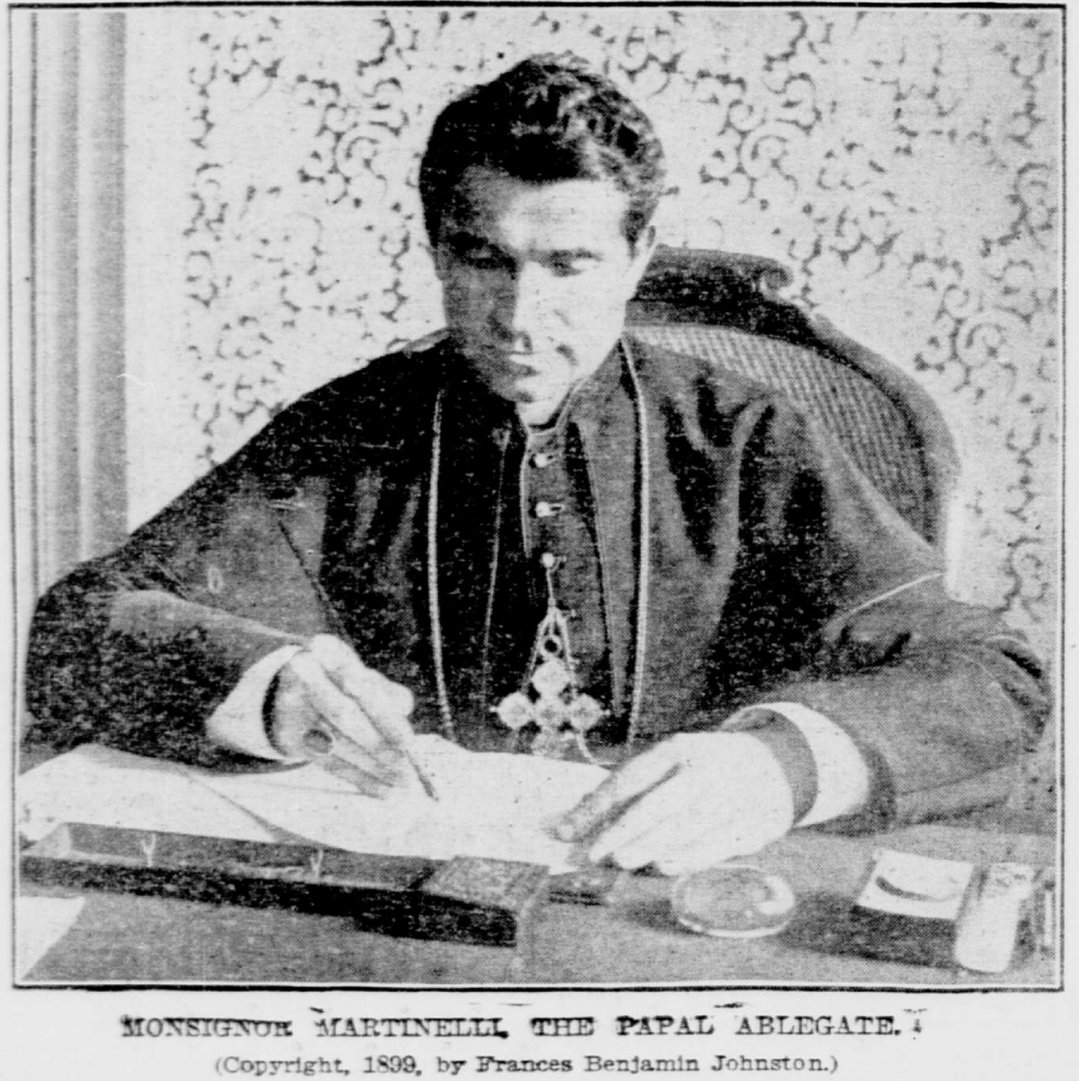
Monsignor Martinelli, photographed in 1899 by Frances Benjamin Johnston

He was appointed apostolic delegate to the United States on 18 April 1896 by Pope Leo XIII and titular archbishop of Ephesus on 18 August 1896. He was consecrated on 30 August 1896, by Mariano Rampolla, Cardinal Secretary of State. He took possession of the apostolic delegation on 4 October 1896. He was much more popular than his predecessor, Cardinal Satolli. In this role, he attended the dedication of St. Mary's Church in Dedham, Massachusetts.

=== Cardinalate ===
He was created and proclaimed Cardinal-Priest of Sant'Agostino by Pope Leo XIII on 15 April 1901, and received the red hat on 9 June 1902. He participated in the 1903 conclave that elected Pope Pius X. He was a member of the commission, headed by Cardinal Pietro Gasparri, for the codification of canon law (1906–1917). He was Camerlengo of the Sacred College of Cardinals from 15 April 1907 until 29 April 1909. He was appointed Prefect of the Sacred Congregation of Rites on 8 February 1909. He did not participate in the conclave of 1914 that elected Pope Benedict XV because of illness. He died in Rome on 4 July 1918, and is buried in Rome's Campo Verano cemetery.

== Personality and appearance ==
The New York Times, upon Martinelli's arrival in America as the new apostolic delegate in 1896, published a thorough assessment of the bishop's personal appearance and personality. The newspaper described him thus:

[Bishop Martinelli speaks] excellent English, with only a slight accent. (Note: The same article mentions that Martinelli had learned to speak English while a teacher of the Irish Augustinians, in the house of Santa Maria in Posterula in Rome.) His voice is soft and musical, and he is very graceful, with an attractive manner. He is a small man, not over 5 feet 5 inches in height, of good build, and he has a typical Italian face. He is very dark, his hair is black and his eyes brilliantly black. The eyes are of the kind that seem to look clear through one. They are the most pronounced feature of their possessor. He has a very square jaw, and when he smiles there is a slight curl of the under lip [sic]. Altogether the face is one that strikes an observer as that of a more than ordinarily intelligent man.

== Notes and references ==
Notes

Works cited

- Cheney, David M (10 February 2010), Sebastiano Cardinal Martinelli, O.S.A. †, Catholic-Hierarchy
- "Successor of Satolli: Arrival of Archbishop Martinelli, Papal Delegate" (PDF), The New York Times, 4 October 1896
- Miranda, Salvador, (132) 2. MARTINELLI, O.E.S.A., Sebastiano

Catholic Church titles
Preceded by Francesco Satolli	Apostolic Delegate to the United States; 1896–1902	Succeeded by Diomede Falconio
Preceded by Antonio María Cascajares y Azara	Cardinal Priest of Sant'Agostino; 1902–1918	Succeeded by Aleksander Kakowski
Preceded by Pietro Respighi	Camerlengo of the Sacred College of Cardinals; 15 April 1907 – 29 April 1909	Succeeded by Casimiro Gennari
Preceded by Luigi Tripepi	Prefect of the Congregation of Rites; 8 February 1909 – 4 July 1918	Succeeded by Scipione Tecchi
