= Pietro La Fontaine =

Servant of God Pietro La Fontaine
- Cardinal, Patriarch of Venice
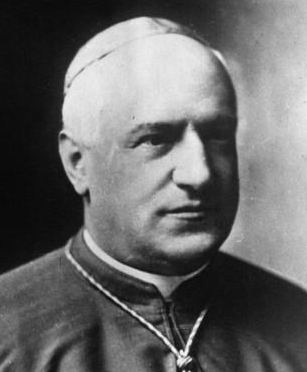
- La Fontaine in 1922
- Church: Roman Catholic Church
- Archdiocese: Venice
- Metropolis: Venice
- See: Venice
- Appointed: 5 March 1915
- Term ended: 9 July 1935
- Predecessor: Aristide Cavallari
- Successor: Adeodato Giovanni Piazza
- Other post: Cardinal-Priest of Santi XII Apostoli (1921–35)
- Previous posts: Bishop of Cassano all'Jonio (1906–10); Vicar of the Basilica of Saint John Lateran (1908–09); Apostolic Administrator of San Marco e Brisignano (1909–10); Secretary of the Congregation of Rites (1910–15); Titular Bishop of Carystus (1910–15); Cardinal-Priest of Santi Nereo ed Achilleo (1916–21)

Orders
- Ordination: 22 December 1883 by Giovanni Battista Paolucci
- Consecration: 23 December 1906 by Pietro Respighi
- Created cardinal: 4 December 1916 by Pope Benedict XV
- Rank: Cardinal-Priest

Personal details
- Born: Pietro La Fontaine; 29 November 1860 Viterbo, Lazio, Kingdom of Italy
- Died: 9 July 1935 (aged 74) Fietta del Grappa, Treviso, Italy
- Coat of arms: Pietro La Fontaine's coat of arms

Styles of Pietro La Fontaine
- Reference style: His Eminence
- Spoken style: Your Eminence
- Informal style: Cardinal
- See: Venice

Ordination history of Pietro La Fontaine
History
Priestly ordination
- Ordained by: Giovanni Battista Paolucci
- Date: 22 December 1883
- Place: Viterbo Cathedral, Kingdom of Italy
Episcopal consecration
- Principal consecrator: Pietro Respighi
- Co-consecrators: Antonio Maria Grasselli & Raffaele Virili
- Date: 23 December 1906
- Place: Collegio Capranica, Rome, Kingdom of Italy
Cardinalate
- Elevated by: Pope Benedict XV
- Date: 4 December 1916
Episcopal succession
Bishops consecrated by Pietro La Fontaine as principal consecrator
- Celso Benigno Luigi Costantini: 24 August 1921
- Isidoro Sain: 8 August 1926
- Giovanni Costantini: 5 May 1929
- Giovanni Jeremich: 25 July 1929
- Mario Vianello: 10 May 1931
- Pietro Tagliapietra: 1 May 1932

Pietro La Fontaine (29 November 1860 – 9 July 1935) was an Italian Roman Catholic cardinal who served as the Patriarch of Venice from 1915 until his death. He was also a member of the Roman Curia and held several other positions prior to his elevation to the cardinalate and patriarchate. La Fontaine remained a simple pastor at heart and was known for his gentleness and his welcoming nature as both a bishop and patriarch. He was supportive of some aspects of fascism but came to oppose it when he saw it was becoming a totalitarian regime. La Fontaine was viewed as "papabile" in the 1922 papal conclave that elected Pope Pius XI and was a serious contender for the papal see, having garnered a great deal of votes until Cardinal Ratti's selection on the fourteenth ballot.

His cause of canonization commenced over three decades after his death and he has been titled as a Servant of God.

== Life ==
=== Priesthood and positions ===
Pietro La Fontaine was born in 1860, in Viterbo, as the second of five sons to Francesco La Fontaine and Maria Bianchini. His father was from Geneva in origins and had been a soldier in the papal guard turned watchmaker while his mother was the daughter of Giuseppe Bianchini who served as the administrator general of the properties of the Doria-Pamphili-Landi.

His initial education was spent under both the Brothers of the Christian Schools and later the Jesuits before he set himself on the ecclesial path. He began studies for the priesthood in Viterbo in 1874 and was ordained as a priest on 22 December 1883 in the Viterbo Cathedral. He served as a parish priest until he was made a professor of literature and Sacred Scripture from 1882 to 1905, and also served as a spiritual director from 1893 until his appointment as a rector in 1896. In 1906, he served briefly as the cathedral canon and as a chaplain at the Gradi jail. Pope Pius X appointed him as the Bishop of Cassano all'Jonio and he received his episcopal consecration on 23 December 1906 in Rome at the Collegio Capranica chapel from Pietro Respighi with Antonio Maria Grasselli and Raffaele Virili serving as the co-consecrators. On 28 December 1908, an earthquake that had struck Messina and surrounding cities saw him open the doors to the episcopal palace for people to find refuge. He aided the displaced and the wounded and tended to orphaned children.

=== Episcopate ===
In 1908, La Fontaine was appointed as the vicar for the Basilica of Saint John Lateran and in 1909 was appointed as the Apostolic Administrator of San Marco e Brisignano, to oversee the diocese until a replacement bishop was found. He was appointed as the Titular Bishop of Caristo on 1 April 1910, and the same year was called to lead the Congregation of Rites but never held the title "Prefect" since the pope then held that traditional title.

He served as a consulter in a papal commission for the codification of the code of canon law. On 2 April 1910, Pius X named La Fontaine as the vicar for Saint Peter's Basilica, where he would participate in the pope's liturgical reform with a particular focus on the reform of breviaries.

During World War I, he refused to leave his archdiocese even during times of aerial bombardment. In November 1917, came eight hours of bombing which proved to be the fiercest night of Austrian-led attacks. He spent the entire night begging for relief from the Mother of God and vowed he would build a temple in her honor if Venice was spared from further bombings.

=== Cardinalate ===
In 1915, he was appointed and installed as the Patriarch of Venice. Pope Benedict XV elevated him to the cardinalate on 4 December 1916 as the Cardinal-Priest of Santi Nereo ed Achilleo; he received the red hat and title on 7 December. La Fontaine's title was later changed to Cardinal-Priest of Ss. XII Apostoli on 7 March 1921.

==== Papabile ====
La Fontaine participated in the papal conclave of 1922 that elected Pope Pius XI, and was himself viewed as "papabile" for his pastoral qualities. The German cardinals met just after the conclave opened before retiring for the evening, after having deliberated and settling on voting for La Fontaine as their second choice if Pietro Gasparri withdrew his candidature. In the first two ballots he received four votes and had been perceived as both a conservative and compromise candidate; but it became clear that he was no compromise but rather a serious contender. He received nine votes in a later ballot with the sudden shift being seen as Willem Marinus van Rossum lost his four votes to the patriarch. La Fontaine secured seven votes in a later ballot before Cardinal del Val urged his supporters to follow La Fontaine; it led to him securing 13 votes at the fifth ballot.

The patriarch secured 22 votes in the seventh ballot though dropped to 21 votes in the eighth due to a cardinal switching his vote to the Archbishop of Milan Achille Ratti who was emerging as a possible candidate. He secured 18 votes on the ninth ballot on 5 February but dropped to eight in the tenth. He secured 23 votes in the ballot afterward and then 22 in the final ballot before dinner. The cardinal secured 18 votes in the 13th ballot but it was Achille Ratti who was elected as Pope Pius XI.

He served as a member of the Congregation for the Oriental Churches and as a papal legate to the centennial celebrations of Dante Alighieri in Ravenna on 13 September 1921. He was also the papal legate to the Eucharistic Congress in Chioggia on 15 September 1923 as well as to the Regional Eucharistic Congress in Ancona (1927) and the National Eucharistic Congress in Vienna (30 August 1933). On 22 April 1924, he was granted the Constantinian Order of Saint George. He was frugal in his outlook and before he died sold his gondola, hoping the funds collected would be used for the poor, while eschewing heating in the patriarchal palace during the cold winter months. La Fontaine had supported some aspects of fascism at its outset though he came to oppose it when he saw that it was changing the Italian nation into a totalitarian regime that was encroaching on Church rights and the rights of people.

=== Death ===
La Fontaine died on 9 July 1935 at 10:00am from arteriosclerosis. He had been ill since the beginning of that month and had moved to Treviso hoping to recover. He had suffered from diabetes in his later life. Four archbishops and 12 bishops as well as some regional senators attended his 12 July funeral which ended with him being interred in Lido in a chapel he had commissioned himself. His remains were transferred on 8 July 1959 into the Basilica of Saint Mark in the sarcophagus that was once intended for his future successor Angelo Giuseppe Roncalli, who had become Pope John XXIII.

== Beatification process ==
The cause for La Fontaine's beatification was opened on 22 February 1960 (in a local investigation) under his third successor Giovanni Urbani. Theologians assessed his writings and approved them on 10 November 1971, after asserting his writings were in line with doctrine and contained no errors that would impede the beatification process. The informative process of investigation received validation from the Congregation for the Causes of Saints on 11 March 1988. The postulator for this cause is Andrea Ambrosi.

== Bibliography ==
- Musolino, G. (1987). "Riforme del vescovo Pietro La Fontaine nella diocesi di Cassano Jonio (1907–1910)," (in Italian), in: Rivista storica calabrese» vol. 8 (1987), pp. 379-392.
- Musolino, G. (2009). Pietro La Fontaine, Cardinale di S.R.E. (Viterbo 1860–Paderno del Grappa 1935) Vescovo di Cassano All' Jonio e Patriarca di Venezia. (in Italian). Roma: Ginevra Bentivoglio Editoria 2009.
- Tramontin, S. (1986). "Il cardinale Pietro La Fontaine e la diocesi di Cassano Jonio," (in Italian), in Rivista storica calabrese vol. 7 (1986), pp. 315-323.

=== External links ===
- Hagiography Circle
- Catholic Hierarchy ^{[self-published]}
- The Cardinals of the Holy Roman Church

Catholic Church titles
Preceded by Antonio Maria Bonito	Bishop of Cassano all'Jonio; 6 December 1906 – 1 April 1910	Succeeded by Giuseppe Rovetta
Preceded by Pacificio Fiorani	Titular Bishop of Carystus; 1 April 1910 – 5 March 1915	Succeeded by Paul-Gaston Laperrine d'Hautpoul
Preceded by Diomede Panici	Secretary of the Congregation for Rites; 2 April 1910 – 5 March 1915	Succeeded by Alessandro Verde
Preceded by Aristide Cavallari	Patriarch of Venice; 5 March 1915 – 9 July 1935	Succeeded by Adeodato Giovanni Piazza
Preceded by Dennis Joseph Dougherty	Cardinal-Priest of Santi Nereo ed Achilleo; 7 December 1916 – 3 March 1921	Succeeded by Anton Hubert Fischer
Preceded by José Sebastião d’Almeida Neto	Cardinal-Priest of Ss. XII Apostoli; 3 March 1921 – 9 July 1935	Succeeded by Ignace Gabriel I Tappouni
