= Francisca Dorotea =

Spanish mystic

Servant of God Francisca Dorotea OP
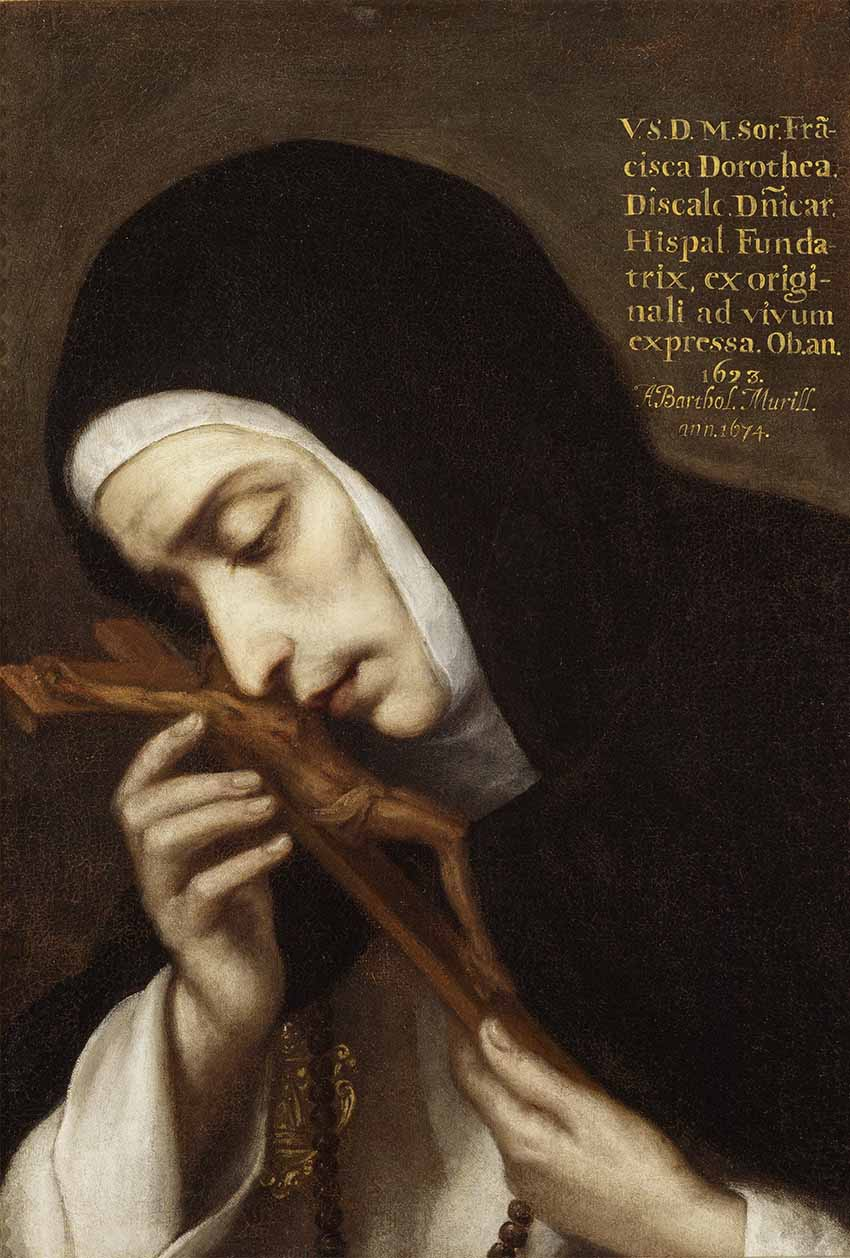
- Born: Francisca Dorotea Bernaldo Vivas; 6 February 1558; Santiago de Compostela, A Coruña, Spain
- Died: 13 March 1623 (aged 65); Seville, Spain

Francisca Dorotea Bernaldo Vivas (6 February 1558 – 13 March 1623) was a Spanish Dominican nun. She founded the Convent of Santa María de los Reyes in Seville.

== Biography ==
She was born on 6 February 1558 in Santiago de Compostela to Gaspar Bernaldo de Villada, a native of Guadalajara, and Catalina Vivas Lucero from Málaga, where a relative of her mother served as canon. Soon her family moved to Seville, where her paternal grandparents had returned from the Americas. In 1590, she founded a community of Dominican nuns and, after several changes of headquarters and different approvals, she founded the convent of Santa María de los Reyes in 1611, in which she took vows in 1613. She lived an austere, penitential life that made her known throughout Spain. She died on 13 March 1623 with a reputation for holiness.

== Beatification ==
In 1630, her cause for beatification was initiated and processed by the Sacred Congregation of Rites until 1777 when it was definitively closed. There have been many attempts to reopen her cause but to no success. She is regarded as "venerable" in the Dominican Order.
