= Giovanni Urbani =

Italian Catholic patriarch of Venice and cardinal (1900–1969)

His Eminence Giovanni Urbani
- Cardinal, Patriarch of Venice
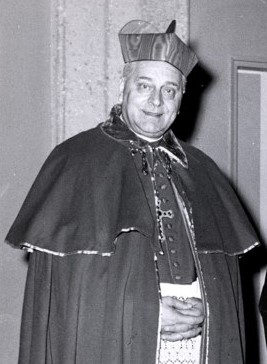
- Cardinal Urbani in 1964
- Church: Roman Catholic Church
- Archdiocese: Venice
- See: Venice
- Appointed: 11 November 1958
- Term ended: 17 September 1969
- Predecessor: Angelo Giuseppe Roncalli
- Successor: Albino Luciani
- Other posts: Cardinal-Priest of San Marco (1962–69); President of the Italian Episcopal Conference (1966–69)
- Previous posts: Titular Bishop of Axornis (1946–48); Auxiliary Bishop of Venice (1946–48); General Ecclesiastical Assistant of Azione Cattolica (1946–55); Titular Archbishop of Sardes (1948–55); Archbishop-Bishop of Verona (1955–58); Cardinal-Priest of Santa Prisca (1958–62)

Orders
- Ordination: 24 September 1922 by Pietro La Fontaine
- Consecration: 8 December 1946 by Adeodato Giovanni Piazza
- Created cardinal: 15 December 1958 by Pope John XXIII
- Rank: Cardinal-priest

Personal details
- Born: Giovanni Urbani; 26 March 1900 Venice, Kingdom of Italy
- Died: 17 September 1969 (aged 69) Venice, Italy
- Motto: In misericordia Tua
- Coat of arms

Styles of Giovanni Urbani
- Reference style: His Eminence
- Spoken style: Your Eminence
- Informal style: Cardinal
- See: Venice

Giovanni Urbani (26 March 1900 – 17 September 1969) was an Italian cardinal of the Roman Catholic Church. He served as Patriarch of Venice from 1958 until his death, and was elevated to the cardinalate in 1958.

== Biography ==
Giovanni Urbani was born in Venice to Angelo and Elisabetta (née Borghi) Urbani, and was an artilleryman during World War I. After studying at the Patriarchal Seminary of Venice, he was ordained to the priesthood by Cardinal Pietro La Fontaine on 24 September 1922. Urbani then did pastoral work in Venice until 1925, furthered his studies for a year, and taught at the seminary from 1927 to 1945. He was raised to the rank of privy chamberlain of his holiness on 12 November 1936, and later domestic prelate of his holiness on 5 June 1943.

On 26 October 1946, he was appointed Titular Bishop of Axomis. Urbani received his episcopal consecration on the following 8 December from Cardinal Adeodato Giovanni Piazza, OCD, with Bishops Giovanni Jeremich and Carlo Zinato serving as co-consecrators, in St. Mark's Basilica. Until 1955, he served as secretary and national counselor of Azione Cattolica's Central Commission, which included instructing Italian parishes against communism. Urbani was promoted to Titular Archbishop of Sardes on 27 November 1948, and was later made Bishop of Verona, with the personal title of archbishop, on 14 April 1955.

Pope John XXIII named Urbani to succeed him as Patriarch of Venice on 11 November 1958. He was the first native Venetian to become patriarch since Cardinal Ludovico Flangini Giovanelli (1801–1804), and was created Cardinal-Priest of S. Prisca by Pope John in the consistory of 15 December of that same year. His cardinalatial title was later changed to Cardinal Priest of S. Marco on 19 March 1962. From 1962 to 1965, the Cardinal attended the Second Vatican Council. He was also one of the cardinal electors who participated in the 1963 papal conclave, which selected Pope Paul VI. Because of his moderate views, Urbani was widely seen as papabile at the conclave. In 1964, he prohibited Venetian priests and nuns from attending the Venice Biennale due to the nudism in its exhibitions.

In 1968, Giovanni gifted some of the relics of St. Mark to Pope Paul VI of Rome, which he later returned to Coptic Pope Cyril VI of the Coptic Church of Alexandria in Egypt on June 24 1968.

Urbani died from a heart attack in Venice at age 69. He is buried in St. Mark's Basilica.

== Papal election ==
- During the conclave of 1963, he silenced Giovanni Battista Cardinal Montini after the latter proposed to withdraw his candidacy in order to avoid a prolonged deadlock.
- His position as patriarch of Venice was unique in the fact that both his predecessor and his successor became pope. His successor as patriarch was Albino Luciani, who was elected Pope John Paul I in August 1978.

Catholic Church titles
Preceded by Girolamo Cardinale	Archbishop of Verona; 1955–1958	Succeeded by Giuseppe Carraro
Preceded by Angelo Roncalli	Patriarch of Venice; 1958–1969	Succeeded by Albino Luciani
Preceded by Giuseppe Siri	President of the Italian Episcopal Conference; 1965–1969	Succeeded by Antonio Poma
