= Luigi Tripepi =

Catholic cardinal

His Eminence Luigi Tripepi
- Pro-Prefect of the Congregation for Rites
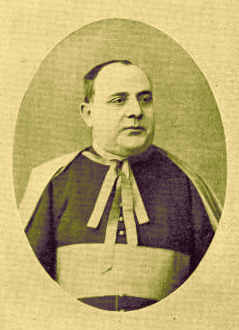
- Church: Roman Catholic Church
- Appointed: 28 January 1904
- Term ended: 29 December 1906
- Predecessor: Position created
- Successor: Scipione Tecchi
- Other post: Cardinal-Deacon Santa Maria in Domnica (1901-06)
- Previous posts: Archivist of the Vatican Secret Archives (1892-94); Secretary of the Congregation for Rites (1894-96); Substitute for General Affairs (1896-1901); Prefect of the Congregation for Indulgences and Sacred Relics (1903-04)

Orders
- Ordination: 1864 by Mariano Ricciardi
- Created cardinal: 15 April 1901 by Pope Leo XIII
- Rank: Cardinal-Deacon

Personal details
- Born: Luigi Tripepi; 21 June 1836 Cardeto, Kingdom of the Two Sicilies
- Died: 29 December 1906 (aged 70) Rome, Kingdom of Italy
- Parents: Antonino Tripepi; Margherita Manuardi
- Education: Pontifical Roman Major Seminary

Luigi Tripepi (21 June 1836 – 29 December 1906) was an Italian Roman Catholic cardinal and poet. He was one of the most important Roman Catholic apologists of the 19th century.

== Biography ==
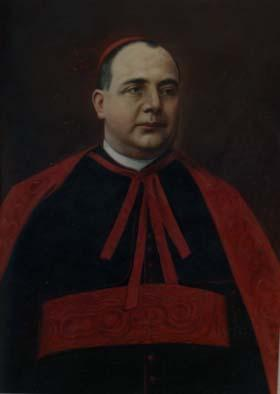
Cazzuitis S., Ritratto del Cardinale Luigi Tripepi

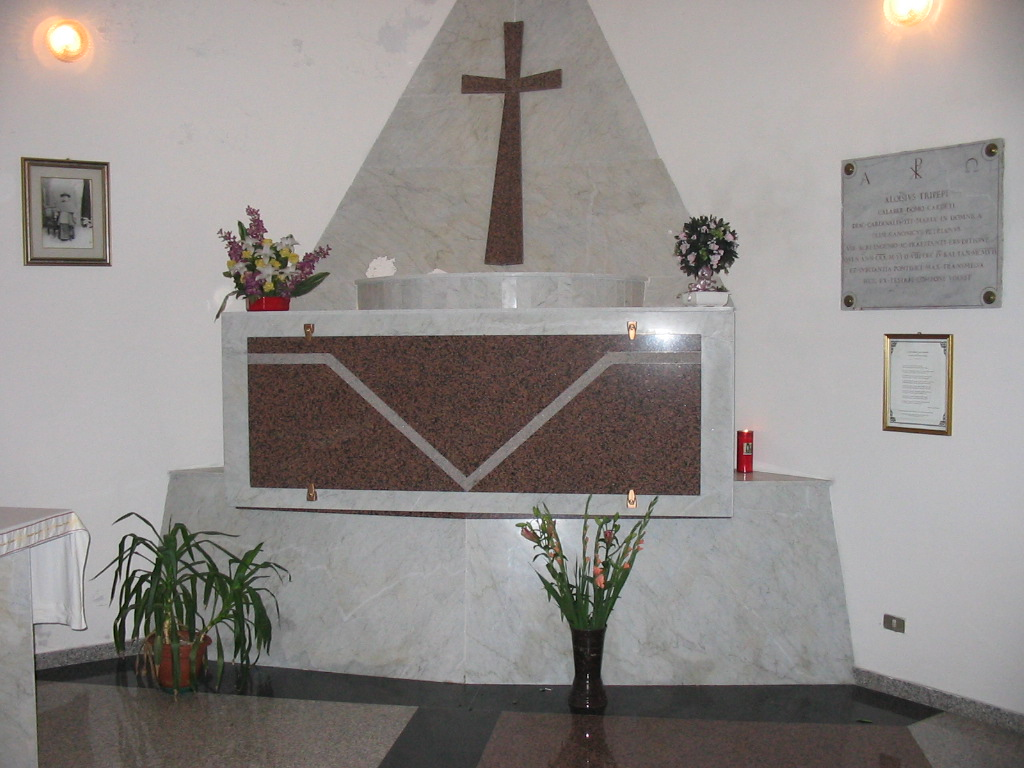
The Mausoleum of Cardinal Tripepi, Mallemace

He was born in Cardeto, a small town in the province of Reggio Calabria, in the deepest south of Italy. His parents were Count Antonino Tripepi and Donna Margherita Manuardi. He was named after his uncle who was a pastor.

He studied at the local seminary and soon became famous for his skills in different subjects: Latin, Greek, theology, history, moral theology and dogmatics. He moved to Rome for further study and in 1864, was ordained a priest. He stayed in Rome for more than 40 years, until his death in 1906. He wrote about 200 works in different languages on a wide range of topics, including: theology, ecclesiastical history and exegesis. He also wrote on poetry in Greek, Latin and Italian.

Originally a Jesuit, he left the order in 1865 and was subsequently appointed to a series of important positions in the Church. In 1868, he was appointed Privy chamberlain and beneficiary of the patriarchal Lateran basilica. In 1878 he was appointed Canon of San Lorenzo in Damaso, Rome and, the following year, of San Giovanni in Laterano basilica. In 1885 he was named canon of St. Peter's. His following appointments include: prelate referendary of the Supreme Tribunal of the Apostolic Signatura (1883); secretary of the Commission for Historical Studies (1884); prefect of the archive of the Holy See (1892); secretary of the Congregation of Rites (1894); Substitute of the Secretariat of State (1896). He was created Cardinal-Deacon of Santa Maria in Domnica by Pope Leo XIII on 15 April 1901. He was later also prefect of the Congregation for Indulgences and Sacred Relics, president of the Academy of the Catholic Religion and pro-prefect of the Sacred Congregation of Rites.

Tripepi died in Rome in 1906 after a stroke. He was buried in the chapel of the chapter of the Vatican Basilica in the Campo Verano Cemetery, Rome. In October 1993 his remains were moved to Mallemace, near Cardeto, and placed in a little mausoleum named after him and built close to a famous sanctuary dedicated to the Holy Mother of Jesus, Madonna Assunta di Mallemace, to whom he was devoted since childhood.

== Sources ==
- Rodà, Massimo (1996-06-21). "Il cardinale Luigi Tripepi, bibliotecario di Cristo, pose la sua cultura al servizio della Chiesa". L'osservatore Romano. Rome.

Catholic Church titles
Preceded by Serafino Cretoni	Prefect of the Congregation of Rites; 7 January 1903 – 29 December 1906	Succeeded by Sebastiano Martinelli
