= Luigi Sepiacci =

Italian prelate

His Eminence Luigi Sepiacci O.E.S.A.
- Prefect of the Congregation for Indulgences and Sacred Relics
- Church: Roman Catholic Church
- Appointed: 1 August 1892
- Term ended: 26 April 1893
- Predecessor: Giuseppe d'Annibale
- Successor: Ignatius Persico
- Other post: Cardinal-Priest of Santa Prisca (1891-93)
- Previous posts: Titular Bishop of Callinicum (1883-91); President of the Pontifical Ecclesiastical Academy (1885-86); Secretary of the Congregation of Bishops and Regulars (1886-92)

Orders
- Ordination: 29 May 1858 by Gioacchino Pecci
- Consecration: 18 March 1883 by Raffaele Monaco La Valletta
- Created cardinal: 14 December 1891 by Pope Leo XIII
- Rank: Cardinal-Priest

Personal details
- Born: Domenico Daniele Sepiacci; 12 September 1835 Castiglione del Lago, Umbria, Papal States
- Died: 26 April 1893 (aged 57) Rome, Kingdom of Italy
- Buried: Campo Verano; Santa Prisca (since 1938)
- Parents: Giuseppe Sepiacci; Maddalena Tufi

Luigi Sepiacci, O.E.S.A. (12 September 1835 – 26 April 1893) – born Domenico Daniele Sepiacci – was an Italian prelate of the Catholic Church who held senior positions in the Roman Curia from 1886 until his death. He was made a cardinal in 1891. He previously led the Order of Saint Augustine, headed the academy where the Holy See trains its diplomats, and led the Diocese of Perugia.

== Biography ==
Domenico Daniele Sepiacci was born in Castiglione del Lago, Italy, on 12 September 1835. He joined the Augustinians on 27 June 1851, He took Luigi as his religious name of Luigi and took his vows on 28 June 1852. He was ordained a priest on 29 May 1858 by the Cardinal Archbishop of Perugia Gioacchino Vincenzo Pecci, who later became Pope Leo XIII. He earned degrees in philosophy, theology, and Oriental languages, and he taught in Belgium and Italy. In 1870 he was appointed principal professor of theology at Sapienza University in Rome. He also served as secretary general and procurator general of his order.

On 15 March 1883, Pope Leo XIII named him titular bishop of Callinicum. He received his episcopal consecration on 18 March from Raffaele Monaco La Valletta, Cardinal Vicar of Rome. (Note: He was to preside by papal appointment at the third plenary council of the bishops of the United States in 1883, but the American bishops were uncomfortable with such direct intervention and instead the archbishop of Baltimore, James Gibbons, took on that role.) He was President of the Pontifical Ecclesiastical Academy for the year 1885–86. In June 1886, Sepiacci became secretary of the Congregation for Religious.

On 14 December 1891 Leo XIII made him cardinal priest of Santa Prisca. On 1 August 1892, Sepiacci became prefect of the Congregation for Relics and Indulgences.

He died in Rome on 26 April 1893 at the age of 57. He was buried in the Augustinians' mausoleum in the Rome's Campo Verano cemetery. In 1938 his remains were transferred to his titular church, Santa Prisca.
