= Aloisio Gardellini =

Italian editor and religious document compiler

Aloisio Gardellini (August 4, 1759, in Rome – October 8, 1829) was an Italian editor and compiler of religious documents. His major work was a collection of the decrees of the Congregation of Rites.

== Collection of decrees ==
Until 1587, the celebration of the Sacrifice of the Mass and the administration of the sacraments had been subject to regulations by various popes. Necessarily, in the course of time, these regulations became somewhat confused by reason of overlapping, amplification, and abolition.

In 1587, Pope Sixtus V, in the Constitution Immensa aeterni Dei, called into being a body of cardinals, bishops, and clerics, whose work was to guard and guide the proper celebration of the liturgical offices.

A collection of papal regulations and congregational decrees was published in 1730 by John Baptist Pithonius, a Venetian priest, the title of his book being Constitutiones pontificae et Romanorum Congregationum decisiones ad sacros Ritus spectantes. This work was somewhat imperfect, and it was not until 1807 that Gardellini published the first two volumes of his collection of the decrees of the Congregation of Rites, to which was prefixed Sacrorum rituum studiosis monitum. Three volumes were published in 1816; a sixth volume was brought out in 1819. This volume contained more recent decrees, including the publication date, and the Commentary on the Clementine Instruction regarding the devotion of the Forty Hours.

A new and corrected edition of Gardellini's work was published in 1827, and in this edition, he included certain relevant statements between 1558 and 1599.

Gardellini was appointed assessor of the Congregation of Rites.

Other editions of the decrees have been issued subsequently.
