= Camillo Mazzella =

Italian Catholic cardinal

His Eminence Camillo Mazzella S.J.
- Prefect of the Congregation for Rites
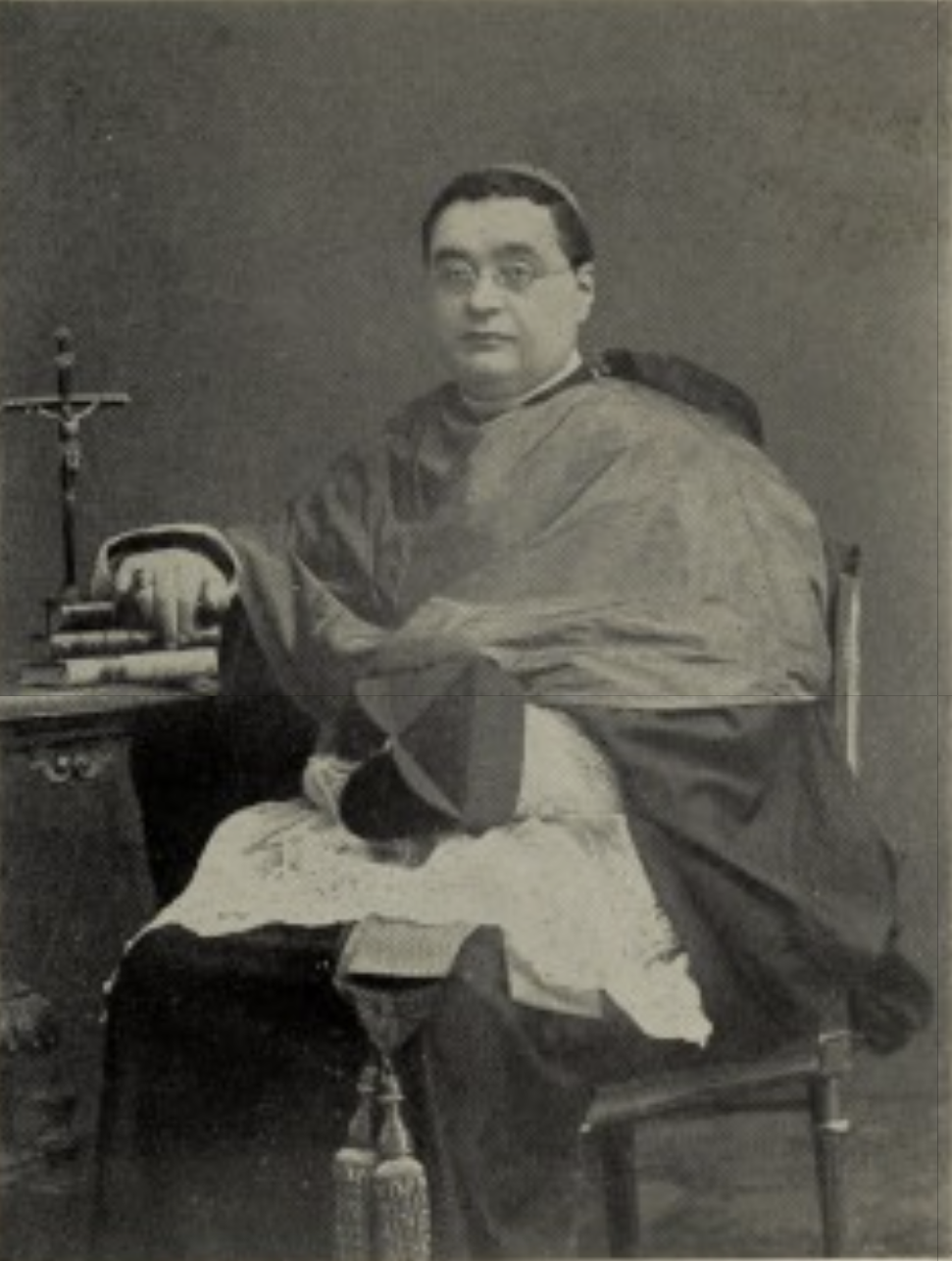
- Church: Roman Catholic Church
- Appointed: 15 June 1897
- Term ended: 26 March 1900
- Predecessor: Gaetano Aloisi Masella
- Successor: Domenico Ferrata
- Other post: Cardinal-Bishop of Palestrina (1897-1900)
- Previous posts: Cardinal-Deacon of Sant'Andriano al Foro (1886-96); Prefect of the Congregation of the Index (1889-93); Prefect of the Congregation for Studies (1893-97); Cardinal-Priest of Santa Maria in Traspontina (1896-97)

Orders
- Ordination: 8 September 1855 by Domenico Carafa della Spina di Traetto
- Consecration: 8 May 1897 by Lucido Maria Parocchi
- Created cardinal: 7 June 1886 by Pope Leo XIII
- Rank: Cardinal-Deacon (1886-96); Cardinal-Priest (1896-97); Cardinal-Bishop (1897-1900)

Personal details
- Born: Camillo Mazzella; 10 February 1833 Vitulano, near Benevento, Kingdom of the Two Sicilies
- Died: 26 March 1900 (aged 67) Rome, Kingdom of Italy
- Buried: Campo Verano
- Parents: Muzio Mazzella; Eugenia Marcarelli

Camillo Mazzella (10 February 1833 – 26 March 1900) was an Italian Jesuit theologian and cardinal.

== Biography ==
Mazzella was born at Vitulano, near Benevento. He and his siblings were first tutored at home. Three of his brothers entered religious life. His twin brother, Ernesto, later became Archbishop of Bari.

Mazzella entered the ecclesiastical seminary of Benevento when about eleven years of age, completed his classical, philosophical, and theological studies before his twenty-fourth year, and was ordained priest in September 1855, a dispensation as he was under canonical age having been granted by Pope Pius IX.

For two years after his ordination he remained at Vitulano, attending to the duties of canon in the parish church, a position he held from his family. Resigning this office he entered the Society of Jesus, 4 September 1857. After spending a year in the novitiate, he was sent to teach philosophy first, at the Seminary of Andria, in Apulia and then at the College of Cosenza, in Calabria.

When the Jesuits were expelled from Naples in 1860, he went to teach theology at Fourvières (Lyon, France), and in 1867 at Georgetown University, Washington, D.C. In 1869, he was the founder and one of the first professors at Woodstock theological college, Maryland, where he was Prefect of Studies. In 1875, he served a Visitor to the Jesuit Mission in New Mexico. Mazzella became a naturalized American citizen.

In 1878, he was called to Rome to teach at the Gregorian University, and later became president of the Academy of Saint Thomas. He was very involved with Pope Leo XIII's promotion of Thomistic Philosophy. In June 1886 he was named cardinal-deacon of Sant'Adriano al Foro. Even as a cardinal, Mazzella maintained his identity as a Jesuit, spending his summers at the novitiate in Naples.

On 1897, he was made Cardinal-Bishop of Palestrina. Mazzella served at various times as prefect of a number of Curial Congregations, and as Cardinal-Protector of several religious institutes. Mazzella was conservative and an Ultramontanist and likely contributed to the drafting of Testem benevolentiae nostrae, Pope Leo's 1899 letter to the cardinal James Gibbons cautioning him about the dangers of Americanism. He was likewise opposed to Darwin's theory of evolution.

He died in Rome and was buried in the chapel of the Society of Jesus in Campo Verano cemetery.

== Works ==
- De gratia Christi (1874).
- De Deo creante (1880).
- De Religione et Ecclesia (1880). (6th edn., 1905, on Google Books.)
