= Adeodato Giovanni Piazza =

Italian friar

His Eminence Adeodato Giovanni Piazza OCD
- Secretary of the Consistorial Congregation
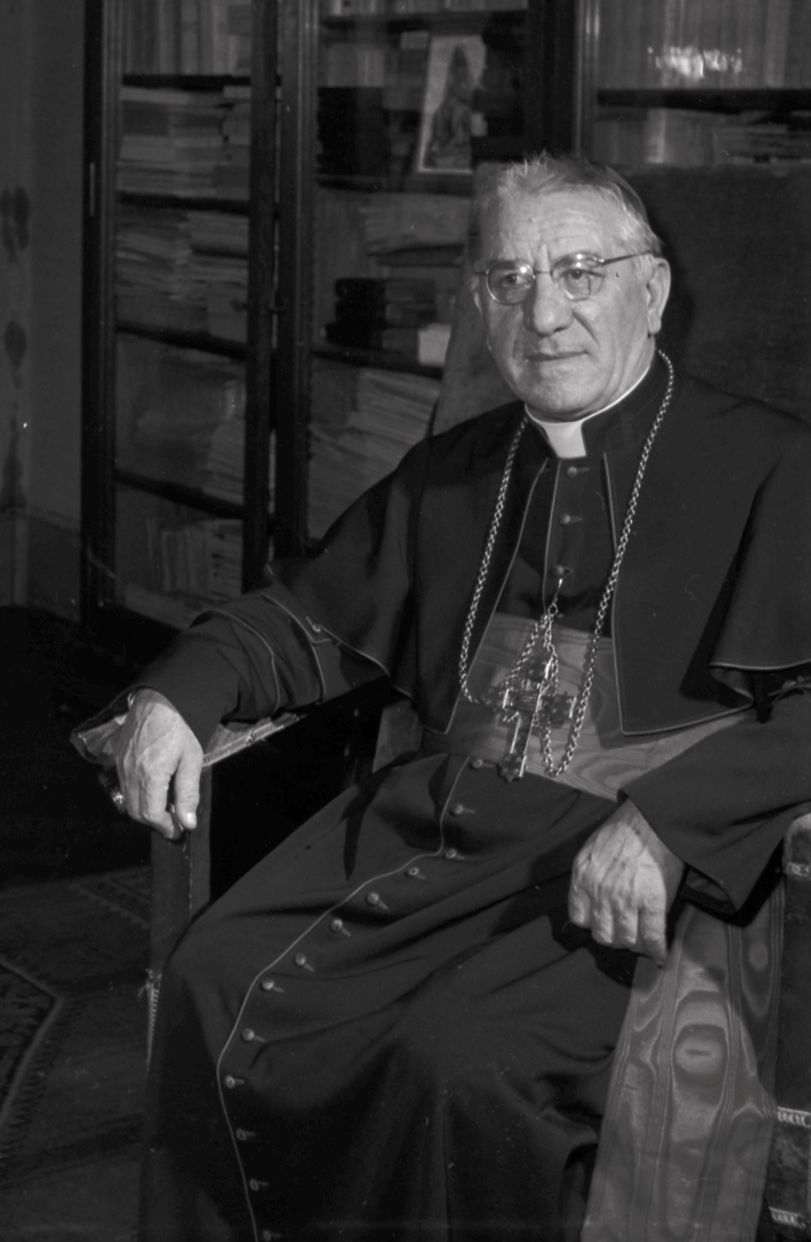
- Cardinal Piazza in September 1953.
- Church: Roman Catholic Church
- Appointed: 1 October 1948
- Term ended: 30 November 1957
- Predecessor: Raffaele Carlo Rossi
- Successor: Marcello Mimmi
- Other posts: President of the Commission of Cardinals for the Shrine of Pompeii (1948–57); Cardinal-Bishop of Sabina e Poggio Mirteto (1949–57)
- Previous posts: Archbishop of Benevento (1930–35); Patriarch of Venice (1935–48); Cardinal-Priest of Santa Prisca (1937–49); Superior-General of the Scalabrinians (1948–51); President of the Italian Episcopal Conference (1953–54)

Orders
- Ordination: 19 December 1908 by Aristide Cavallari
- Consecration: 24 February 1930 by Basilio Pompili
- Created cardinal: 13 December 1937 by Pope Pius XI
- Rank: Cardinal-Priest (1937–49); Cardinal-Bishop (1949–57)

Personal details
- Born: Giovanni Piazza; 30 September 1884 Vigo de Cadore, Belluno, Kingdom of Italy
- Died: 30 November 1957 (aged 73) Rome, Italy
- Buried: Santa Teresa al Corso d'Italia
- Parents: Giuseppe Piazza; Elisabetta Nicolò
- Motto: Ut sint unum

Adeodato Giovanni Piazza, OCD (30 September 1884 – 30 November 1957) was an Italian friar of the Discalced Carmelite Order, who became a cardinal of the Roman Catholic Church, and Patriarch of Venice, as well as a member of the Roman Curia in Vatican City.

== Life ==
He was born in Vigo di Cadore, a small village in the mountains of the Veneto region of Italy, the son of Giuseppe Piazza and Elisabetta Nicolò. In 1897 he began to study at a school run by the friars, being admitted to the Order on 6 August 1902. He professed his religious vows on 7 August 1903, after which he was drafted to fulfil his military obligations by serving in the medical corps in Treviso from 1904 to 1906. He returned to the Carmelite monastery and was sent to complete his seminary studies, professing his solemn vows on 7 August 1907. He was ordained a Catholic priest on 19 December 1908 by the Patriarch of Venice. He then served as the prior in several monasteries of the Order, until the outbreak of World War I, at which time he served as a military chaplain.

After the war, Piazza was again sent to serve as the prior of several local monasteries over the subsequent years. In 1922, he was called to Rome to serve as the Secretary to the Prior General of the Order, serving in that position until 1925, when he was elected as the Procurator General of the Order. On 29 January 1930, Piazza was appointed as the Archbishop of Benevento, for which office he was consecrated as a bishop the following 24 February in the Discalced Carmelite Church of Santa Teresa, Rome.

Piazza was appointed as Patriarch of Venice in December 1935 and formally installed early the next year. He was elevated to cardinal by Pope Pius XI in the consistory of 13 December 1937, with the title of Cardinal-Priest of Santa Prisca. As cardinal, Piazza participated in the Papal conclave of 1939 that elected Pope Pius XII.

Piazza remained Patriarch of Venice until 1948, at which time he was named by Pope Pius XII as the Secretary of the Sacred Consistorial Congregation (now called the Congregation for Bishops). He remained in this capacity until his death. In 1949, his title was changed by the pope to Cardinal Bishop of Sabina e Poggio Mirteto. On 11 June 1951, he consecrated the Blessed Fulton John Sheen a bishop at the Roman basilica of Sts. John and Paul.

Piazza died in Rome on 30 November 1957, and was buried in the Church of Santa Teresa.

== Episcopal lineage ==
Piazza's episcopal lineage, or apostolic succession was:

- Cardinal Scipione Rebiba
- Cardinal Giulio Antonio Santorio
- Cardinal Girolamo Bernerio
- Archbishop Galeazzo Sanvitale
- Cardinal Ludovico Ludovisi
- Cardinal Luigi Caetani
- Cardinal Ulderico Carpegna
- Cardinal Paluzzo Paluzzi Altieri degli Albertoni
- Pope Benedict XIII
- Pope Benedict XIV
- Cardinal Enrico Enríquez
- Archbishop Manuel Quintano Bonifaz
- Cardinal Buenaventura Fernández de Córdoba Spínola
- Cardinal Giuseppe Doria Pamphili
- Pope Pius VIII
- Pope Pius IX
- Cardinal Alessandro Franchi
- Cardinal Giovanni Simeoni
- Cardinal Antonio Agliardi
- Cardinal Basilio Pompili
- Cardinal Adeodato Giovanni Piazza

== Sources ==
- Catholic Hierarchy
- Cardinals of the Holy Roman Church

Catholic Church titles
Preceded by Pietro La Fontaine	Patriarch of Venice; 1936–1948	Succeeded by Carlo Agostini
