= Giuseppe d'Annibale =

Italian Catholic cardinal and theologian

His Eminence Giuseppe D'Annibale
- Prefect of the Congregation for Indulgences and Sacred Relics
- Church: Roman Catholic Church
- Appointed: 22 June 1890
- Term ended: 18 July 1892
- Predecessor: Carlo Cristofori
- Successor: Luigi Sepiacci
- Other post: Cardinal-Priest of Santi Bonifacio ed Alessio (1889-92)
- Previous post: Titular Bishop of Carystus (1881-89)

Orders
- Ordination: 21 September 1839 by Filippo de’ Conti Curoli
- Consecration: 14 August 1881 by Raffaele Monaco La Valletta
- Created cardinal: 11 February 1889 by Pope Leo XIII
- Rank: Cardinal-Priest

Personal details
- Born: Giuseppe D'Annibale; 22 September 1815 Borbona, Rieti, Papal States
- Died: 18 July 1892 (aged 76) Borbona, Rieti, Kingdom of Italy
- Parents: Giuseppe D'Annibale; Maddalena Marinucci

Giuseppe d'Annibale (22 September 1815 – 18 July 1892) was an Italian Catholic cardinal and theologian.

== Biography ==
He was appointed professor in the Seminary of Rieti and later vicar-general of the diocese. He was preconized Titular Bishop of Caryste by Pope Leo XIII on 12 August 1881, was created Cardinal-Priest of Santi Bonifacio e Alessio on 11 February 1889, and became Prefect of the Congregation for Indulgences and Sacred Relics.

== Works ==
Among d'Annibale's works is a treatise on moral theology, entitled "Summula theologiae moralis" (Milan, 1881–1883). He also wrote a commentary on the Constitution "Apostolicae Sedis" (Rieti, 1880).
