= Girolamo Maria Gotti =

Italian friar and cardinal (1834–1916)

His Eminence Girolamo Maria Gotti OCD
- Prefect of the Congregation for the Propagation of the Faith
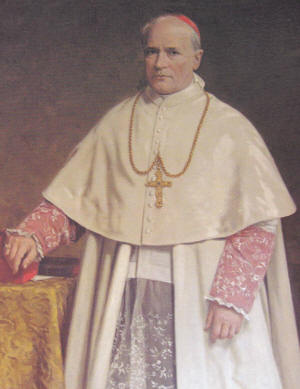
- Church: Roman Catholic Church
- Appointed: 29 July 1902
- Term ended: 19 March 1916
- Predecessor: Mieczysław Halka-Ledóchowski
- Successor: Domenico Serafini
- Other post: Cardinal-Priest of Santa Maria della Scala pro hac vice (1895–1916)
- Previous posts: Titular Archbishop of Petra (1892–95); Apostolic Internuncio to Brazil (1892–95); Camerlengo of the College of Cardinals (1896–97); Prefect of the Congregation of Indulgences and Sacred Relics (1896–99); Prefect of the Congregation of Bishops and Regulars (1899–1902)

Orders
- Ordination: 20 December 1856 by Raffaele Biale
- Consecration: 27 March 1892 by Lucido Maria Parocchi
- Created cardinal: 29 November 1895 by Pope Leo XIII
- Rank: Cardinal-Priest

Personal details
- Born: Antonio Giovanni Benedetto Gotti; 29 March 1834 Genoa, Kingdom of Sardinia
- Died: 19 March 1916 (aged 81) Piazza di Spagna, Rome, Kingdom of Italy
- Buried: Campo Verano (1916–66); Santa Maria della Scala
- Parents: Filippo Gotti; Caterina Schiappacasse

Girolamo Maria Gotti, OCD (29 March 1834 – 19 March 1916), sometimes called Giuseppe Gotti, was an Italian Catholic friar of the Discalced Carmelites who served in various offices of the Holy See as a cardinal of the Catholic Church.

== Biography ==
Gotti was born Antonio Giovanni Benedetto Gotti in Genoa, then part of the Kingdom of Sardinia, the second of the five children of Filippo Gotti, a dock worker originally from Bergamo, and Caterina Schiappacassea. He was sent to study at the Jesuit academy in Genoa, after which he entered the novitiate of the Order of Discalced Carmelites in Loano in 1849. On 10 November 1850, he received the religious habit and the religious name of Girolamo Maria dell'Immacolata Concezione (Jerome Mary of the Immaculate Conception). After his religious profession as a member of the Order on 12 November 1851, he began his studies for the priesthood, which he completed in 1856, being ordained a priest on 20 December 1856.

In the following decades, Gotti was a professor of philosophy and theology in the local monastery. He also taught mathematics at the local naval academy during this period. He was already regarded as a tireless student and scholar, as well as an ascetic who, despite the influence he was having, would always sleep on the floor.

Styles of Girolamo Maria Gotti
- Reference style: His Eminence
- Spoken style: Your Eminence
- Informal style: Cardinal
- See: Petra (titular see)

At the First Vatican Council in 1870, Gotti served as a peritus (theological advisor) to the Prior General of the Discalced Carmelite Order. By 1881 he had become Prior General himself, a position he retained until 1897. He became a counselor to several curial congregations in Rome during the 1880s and was also Apostolic Examiner of the Roman Clergy during this decade. He was selected for various special missions to South America, which he fulfilled with success, especially in Brazil. In 1892, Gotti became Titular Archbishop of Petra and Internuncio to Brazil. At the consistory of 29 November 1895, he was elevated to cardinal by Pope Leo XIII, being assigned as his titular church the Church of Santa Maria della Scala, in the Trastevere neighborhood of Rome, which is attached to the General Motherhouse of the Order.

Gotti became Prefect of the Congregation for Bishops (then known as the Congregation for Bishops and Regulars) in 1896, but was transferred to the Propaganda Fide, where most of his curial experience had been concentrated, in July 1902. Gotti was often mentioned as a likely successor to Leo XIII even though he was seen as a very different man, much more deeply pious and ascetic.

Gotti was papabile at the 1903 papal conclave, when he was generally believed to be the most likely opponent of Pope Leo's Cardinal Secretary of State Mariano Rampolla, and some, noting opposition to Rampolla just before Pope Leo's death, had said Gotti was likely to win. Gotti was Rampolla's main challenger in the first four ballots. When it became clear Rampolla had too many opponents to be able to gain the necessary 42 votes for election, his supporters turned to Cardinal Giuseppe Sarto, and after seven ballots Sarto was elected as Pope Pius X. Gotti is the only Carmelite cardinal to have been a serious candidate for the papacy since the Order was founded in the 13th century.

Under Pope Pius, Gotti continued as Prefect of the Propaganda Fide until his death in 1916. He participated in the 1914 conclave, though his age prevented him from being considered for a candidate.

Gotti died on 29 March 1916 as a result of anemia. His remains were buried in the chapel of the Discalced Carmelite Order in the Campo Verano Cemetery of Rome. On 21 March 1966, his remains were transferred to the Chapel of San Giovanni Battista in the Church of Santa Maria della Scala.
