= Gaetano Aloisi Masella =

Italian cardinal

His Eminence Gaetano Aloisi Masella
- Pro-Datary of the Apostolic Dataria
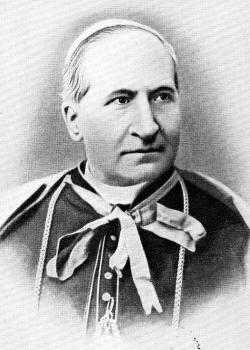
- The cardinal in 1890.
- Church: Roman Catholic Church
- Appointed: 29 May 1897
- Term ended: 22 November 1902
- Predecessor: Angelo Bianchi
- Successor: Angelo Di Pietro
- Other post: Cardinal-Priest of Santa Prassede (1803-1902)
- Previous posts: Titular Archbishop of Neocæsarea (1877-87); Apostolic Nuncio to Portugal (1879-83); Cardinal-Priest of San Tommaso in Parione (1887-93); Prefect of the Congregation for Indulgences and Sacred Relics (1887-88); Prefect of the Congregation for Rites (1889-92); Camerlengo of the College of Cardinals (1892-93)

Orders
- Ordination: 3 June 1849
- Consecration: 3 June 1877 by Alessandro Franchi
- Created cardinal: 14 March 1887 by Pope Leo XIII
- Rank: Cardinal-Priest

Personal details
- Born: Gaetano Aloisi Masella; 30 September 1826 Pontecorvo, Papal States
- Died: 22 November 1902 (aged 76) Rome, Kingdom of Italy
- Education: Pontifical Roman Major Seminary; Pontifical Roman Athenaeum Saint Apollinare
- Coat of arms

Styles of Gaetano Aloisi Masella
- Reference style: His Eminence
- Spoken style: Your Eminence
- Informal style: Cardinal
- See: none

Gaetano Aloisi Masella (30 September 1826 – 22 November 1902) was an Italian Cardinal of the Roman Catholic Church. He was elevated to the cardinalate in 1887 and served as Prefect of the Congregation of Rites from 1899 until his death.

Gaetano Aloisi Masella was born in Pontecorvo; he was the uncle of future cardinal Benedetto Aloisi Masella

== Career ==
He was ordained to the priesthood on 3 June 1849 in the Lateran Basilica, and then served as secretary of the nunciature in Naples. Aloisi Masella later became auditor of the nunciature to Germany in 1858, and of the nunciature to France in 1862. In 1869, he entered the service of the Roman Curia as consultor for diplomatic affairs in the Vatican Secretariat of State. He was made a referendary prelate of the Supreme Tribunal of the Apostolic Signature in 1870, and accompanied Archbishop Alessandro Franchi to Constantinople in 1874, the same year in which he was named Secretary for Oriental Affairs in the Sacred Congregation for the Propagation of the Faith.

On 22 May 1877, Aloisi Masella was appointed Titular Archbishop of Neocaesarea in Ponto by Pope Pius IX. After receiving his episcopal consecration in the following June from Cardinal Franchi, he was later named Apostolic Nuncio to Bavaria on 5 June that year, and Nuncio to Portugal on 30 September 1879. Pope Leo XIII created him Cardinal-Priest of S. Tommaso in Parione in the consistory of 14 March 1887.

After becoming Prefect of the Sacred Congregation of Indulgences and Relics on 16 November 1887, Aloisi Masella was made Prefect of the office of economic planning of the Sacred Congregation for the Propagation of the Faith and President of the general administration of the Chamber of Despoilments on 13 February 1888. He was appointed Prefect of the S.C. of Rites on 3 October 1889, and also served as Camerlengo of the Sacred College of Cardinals from 11 July 1892 to 16 January 1893. He opted for the titular church of S. Prassede on 16 January 1893, and was named Pro-Datary of His Holiness on 29 May 1897, remaining in that post until his death. He declined an offering of a suburbicarian see to continue working in the reorganization of the Apostolic Datary.

== Death ==
The Cardinal died in Rome, at age 76. After being exposed in the Palace of the Datary and a Requiem in the basilica of Ss. XII Apostoli, his body was buried in his family's tomb in his native Pontecorvo.

Catholic Church titles
Preceded by Angelo Bianchi	Nuncio to Bavaria; 1877–1879	Succeeded by Cesare Roncetti
Preceded by Domenico Sanguigni	Nuncio to Portugal; 1879–1887	Succeeded by Vincenzo Vannutelli
Preceded by Camillo Mazzella, SJ	Prefect of the Congregation of Rites; 1899–1902	Succeeded by Domenico Ferrata
