= Carlo Cristofori =

Italian Cardinal of the Roman Catholic Church

His Eminence Carlo Cristofori
- Prefect of the Congregation for Indulgences and Sacred Relics
- Church: Roman Catholic Church
- Appointed: 14 March 1889
- Term ended: 30 January 1891
- Predecessor: Serafino Vannutelli
- Successor: Giuseppe d'Annibale
- Other post: Cardinal-Deacon of Santi Vito, Modesto e Crescenzia (1885-91)
- Previous post: Prefect of the Vatican Secret Archives (1873-77)

Orders
- Created cardinal: 27 July 1885 by Pope Leo XIII
- Rank: Cardinal-Deacon

Personal details
- Born: Carlo Cristofori; 5 January 1813 Viterbo, Papal States
- Died: 30 January 1891 (aged 78) Palazzo Sachetti, Rome, Kingdom of Italy
- Buried: Campo Verano
- Parents: Luigi Cristofori; Anna Riccioli

Carlo Cristofori (5 January 1813 – 30 January 1891) was an Italian Cardinal of the Roman Catholic Church who was Cardinal-Deacon of Santi Vito, Modesto e Crescenzio from 1885 to 1891.
