= Aristide Cavallari =

His Eminence Aristide Cavallari
- Cardinal, Patriarch of Venice
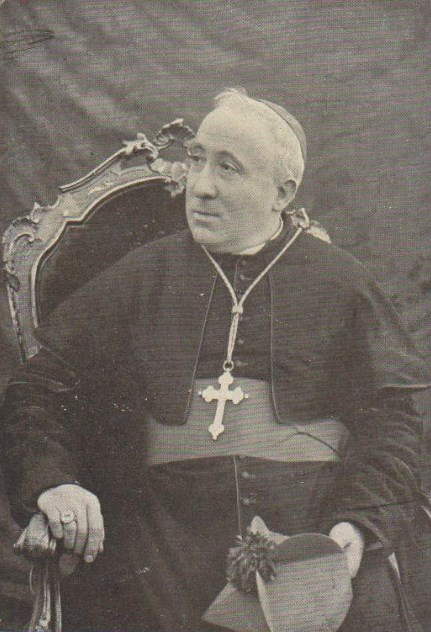
- Cavallari on 7 February 1914.
- Church: Roman Catholic Church
- Archdiocese: Venice
- See: Venice
- Appointed: 13 March 1904
- Installed: 16 March 1904
- Term ended: 24 November 1914
- Predecessor: Giuseppe Melchiorre Sarto
- Successor: Pietro La Fontaine
- Other post: Cardinal-Priest "pro hac vice" of Santa Maria in Cosmedin (1907–14)
- Previous posts: Titular Bishop of Philadelphia in Arabia (1903–04); Auxiliary Bishop of Venice (1903–04); Vicar-General of Venice (1904)

Orders
- Ordination: 24 September 1872 by Giuseppe Luigi Trevisanato
- Consecration: 23 August 1903 by Francesco di Paolo Satolli
- Created cardinal: 15 April 1907 by Pope Pius X
- Rank: Cardinal-Priest

Personal details
- Born: Aristide Cavallari; 8 February 1849 Chioggia, Kingdom of Lombardy–Venetia
- Died: 24 November 1914 (aged 65) Venice, Kingdom of Italy
- Buried: Saint Mark's Basilica, Venice, Italy
- Education: Patriarchal Seminary of Venice

Styles of Aristide Cavallari
- Reference style: His Eminence
- Spoken style: Your Eminence
- Informal style: Cardinal
- See: Venice

Aristide Cavallari (8 February 1849 – 24 November 1914) was a Cardinal of the Roman Catholic Church who served as Patriarch of Venice.

== Early life ==
Aristide Cavallari was born in Chioggia, Italy, and he was educated at the Seminary of Chioggia, where he studied theology for three years. His family moved to Venice, where he continued his studies at the Patriarchal Seminary of Venice.

== Priesthood ==
He was ordained to the priesthood on 27 September 1872 by Cardinal Giuseppe Luigi Trevisanato, then Patriarch of Venice. After his ordination, he did pastoral work in Venice, and also worked in the offices of the patriarchal curia.

== Episcopate ==
Pope Pius X, Patriarch of Venice until his election as Pope, soon appointed Cavallari titular bishop of Philadelphia, and auxiliary bishop of Venice on 22 August 1903 and had him consecrated the next day in Rome by Cardinal Francesco Satolli. While the search for a new Patriarch was ongoing, Cavallari was named vicar general of Venice in January 1904. He exercised these offices until he himself was promoted to the patriarchal see of Venice on 15 April 1904 to fill the vacancy left by the election of Pius X.

== Cardinalate ==
He was created Cardinal-Priest of Santa Maria in Cosmedin (deaconry elevated pro hac vice to title) in the consistory of 15 April 1907; he participated in the conclave of 1914 that elected Pope Benedict XV.

He died shortly after this in November 1914; his remains were transferred to the Patriarchal Cathedral of Venice in November 1957.

Catholic Church titles
Preceded by Giuseppe Melchiorre Sarto	Patriarch of Venice; 13 March 1904 – 24 November 1914	Succeeded by Pietro La Fontaine
