= Angelo Bianchi =

Italian prelate

His Eminence Angelo Bianchi
- Pro-Datary of the Apostolic Dataria
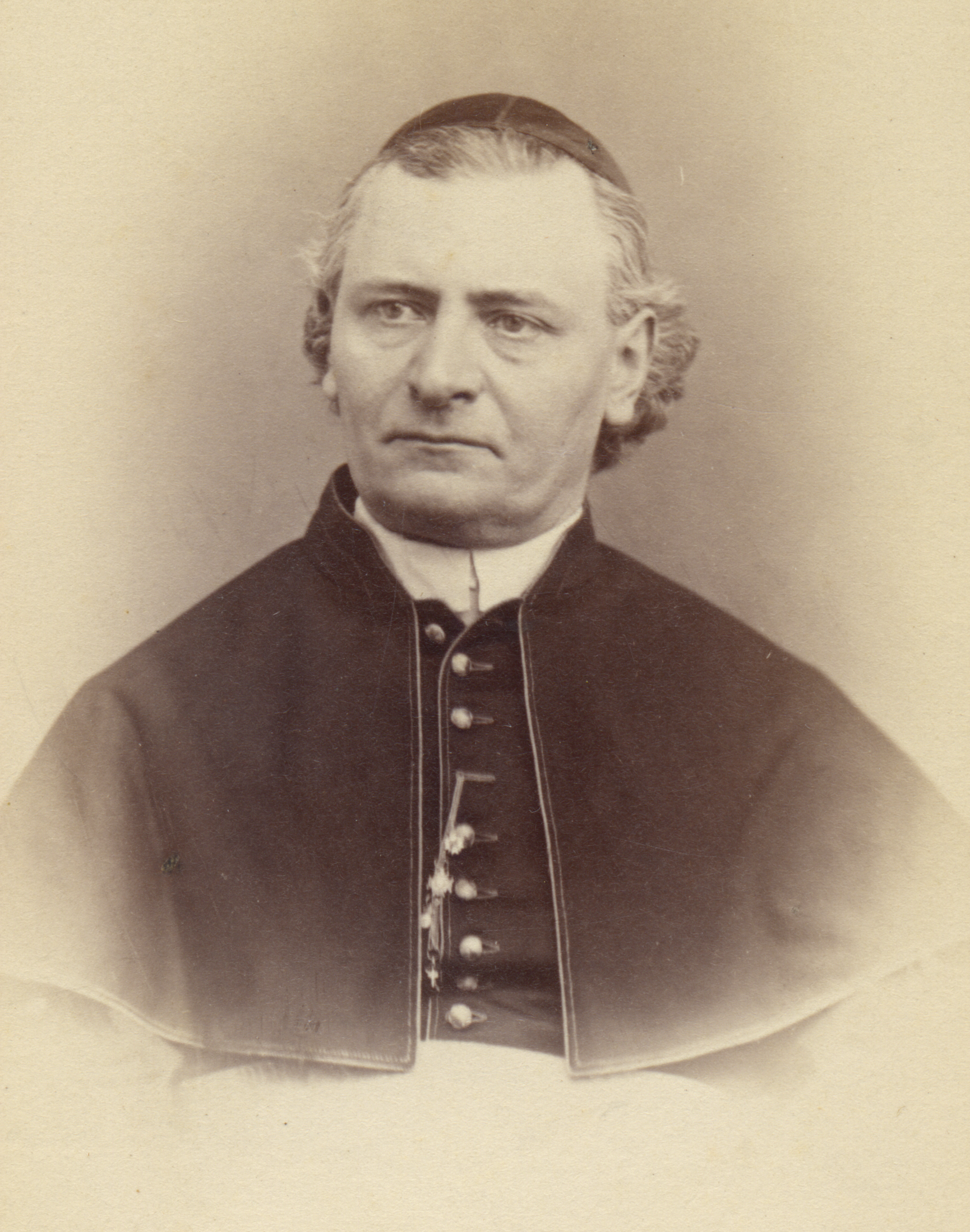
- Church: Roman Catholic Church
- Appointed: 14 March 1889
- Term ended: 22 January 1897
- Predecessor: Carlo Sacconi
- Successor: Gaetano Aloisi Masella
- Other posts: Cardinal-Priest of Santa Prassede (1883-97); Cardinal-Bishop of Palestrina (1889-97); Apostolic Administrator of Subiaco (1889-97)
- Previous posts: Apostolic Internuncio to the Netherlands (1868-74); Apostolic Nuncio to Bavaria (1874-77); Titular Archbishop of Myra (1874-82); Secretary of the Congregation of Bishops and Regulars (1877-79); Commendatory Abbot of Subiaco (1886-89); Prefect of the Congregation for Rites (1887-89)

Orders
- Consecration: 1 November 1874 by Giuseppe Berardi
- Created cardinal: 25 September 1882 by Pope Leo XIII
- Rank: Cardinal-Priest (1883-89); Cardinal-Bishop (1889-97)

Personal details
- Born: Angelo Bianchi; 19 November 1817 Rome, Papal States
- Died: 22 January 1897 (aged 79) Rome, Kingdom of Italy
- Buried: Campo Verano
- Parents: Luigi Bianchi; Luigia Valenti
- Education: Pontifical Roman Athenaeum Saint Apollinare

Angelo Bianchi (19 November 1817 – 22 January 1897) was an Italian prelate of the Catholic Church who worked in the diplomatic service of the Holy See and worked in the Roman Curia. He became a cardinal in 1889.

== Biography ==
Angelo Bianchi was born in Rome on 19 November 1817. He studied at the Roman Seminary of "Sant'Apollinare".

He joined the diplomatic service of the Holy See and was chargé d'affaires in the Apostolic Nunciature to Switzerland from 1864 to 1868. On 14 March 1868 he was named Apostolic Internuncio to the Netherlands.

Pope Pius IX appointed him titular archbishop of Mira on 10 October 1874. He received his episcopal consecration on 1 November 1874 from Cardinal Giuseppe Berardi. Pope Pius named him nuncio to Bavaria on 13 November 1874. He returned to Rome to serve as secretary of the Congregation of Bishops and Regulars on 8 June 1877 and was given his next diplomatic assignment as Apostolic Nuncio to Spain on 30 September 1879.

Pope Leo XIII made him a Cardinal-Priest on 25 September 1882. He received his red biretta and the title of Santa Prassede in the consistory of 15 March 1883.

He was named prefect of the Congregation of Rites and Ceremonies from 15 November 1887 until 14 March 1889. From that day until his death he headed the Apostolic Dataria, an office which the pope employed to grant benefices and marital dispensations.

He chose to be named Cardinal Bishop of the suburbicarian Diocese of Palestrina when it became available on 24 May 1889.

He died in Rome on 22 January 1897.
