= 1903 conclave =

Election of Catholic Pope Pius X

Papal conclave July–August 1903

Dates and location
- 31 July – 4 August 1903; Sistine Chapel, Apostolic Palace, Kingdom of Italy

Key officials
- Dean: Luigi Oreglia di Santo Stefano
- Sub-dean: Serafino Vannutelli
- Camerlengo: Luigi Oreglia di Santo Stefano
- Protopriest: José Sebastião Neto
- Protodeacon: Aloysius Macchi
- Secretary: Rafael Merry del Val

Election
- Electors: 62 (list)
- Vetoed: Mariano Rampolla
- Ballots: 7

Elected pope
- Giuseppe Sarto; Name taken: Pius X
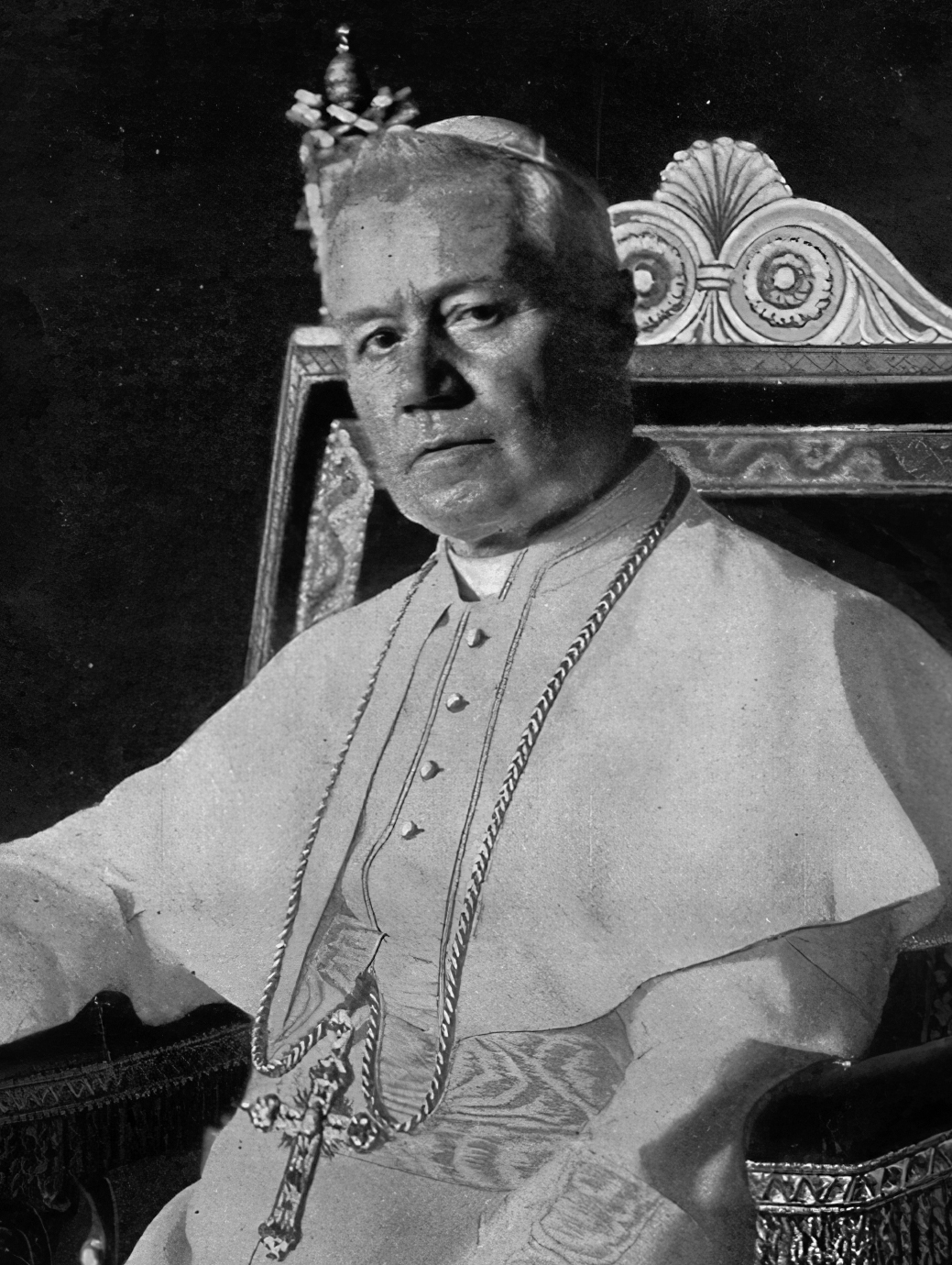

A conclave was held from 31 July to 4 August 1903 to elect a new pope to succeed Leo XIII, who had died on 20 July. Of the 64 members of the College of Cardinals, all but two attended. (Note: The current 80-year-old age limit for cardinal electors was introduced by Pope Paul VI in 1970.) On the seventh ballot, the conclave elected Cardinal Giuseppe Sarto, the patriarch of Venice. After accepting his election, he took the name Pius X.

This was the first conclave to host a representative from North America—James Gibbons, archbishop of Baltimore—and the first to incorporate a non-European born cardinal since the 1471 papal conclave that featured Cardinal Bessarion of Trebizond. Emperor Franz Joseph of Austria asserted the right claimed by certain Catholic rulers to veto a candidate for the papacy, attempting to block the election of the leading candidate, Cardinal Secretary of State Mariano Rampolla.

The Secretary of the Conclave, Archbishop Rafael Merry del Val, reported later that Cardinal Puzyna de Kosielsko came to see him, demanding to announce his veto against Cardinal Rampolla in the Emperor's name. Merry del Val protested and refused even to accept the document. Rampolla, according to Merry del Val, in fact actually attracted further votes subsequent to the veto. However, Merry del Val later told Ludwig von Pastor that he thought Rampolla was unlikely in any case to have won since a majority of the cardinals wanted a more conservative direction following the relatively liberal pontificate of Pope Leo XIII, an opinion he himself shared. (Note: Valérie Pirie also claims that Rampolla would never have won in the conclave, and that all that the veto accomplished was to make him appear a sympathetic figure as a victim of Austrian hostility "inasmuch as it gave his defeat the appearance of having been brought about by a treacherous knock-out blow, when in reality his failure was inevitable; the world at large being still convinced that had it not been for the Austrian veto Rampolla would certainly have been elected Pope.")

== Background ==
The pontificate of Leo XIII came to an end on 20 July 1903 after 25 years, longer than any previous pope, except his predecessor Pius IX; together, they had reigned for 57 years. While Pius IX had been seen as a conservative reactionary, Leo XIII had been seen as a liberal, certainly in comparison with his predecessor. As cardinals gathered, the key question was whether the next pope would continue Leo XIII's policies or return to the style of papacy of Pius IX.

Of the 64 cardinals, 62 participated, the largest number to enter a conclave up until that time. Luigi Oreglia di Santo Stefano was the only elector with previous experience of electing a pope. Health prevented Michelangelo Celesia of Palermo from traveling and Patrick Francis Moran of Sydney was not expected before 20 August. The conclave included James Gibbons of Baltimore, who was the first American cardinal to participate in a papal conclave.

== Balloting ==
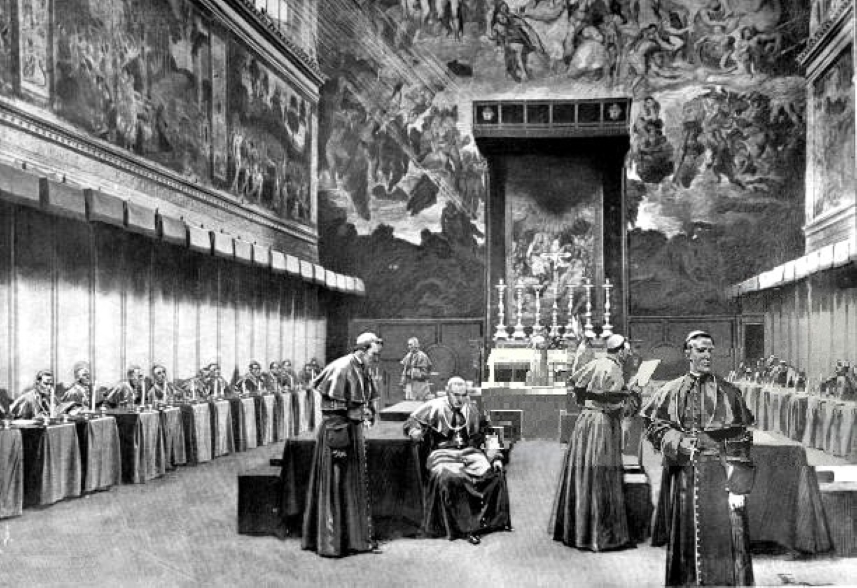
Scrutiny of the conclave

When the cardinals assembled in the Sistine Chapel, attention focused on Cardinal Secretary of State Mariano Rampolla, though cardinals from the German and Austro-Hungarian Empires preferred a candidate more closely aligned with their interests, which meant relatively hostile to France and republicanism and less supportive of the social justice advocacy of Leo XIII. They were persuaded that their first choice, Serafino Vannutelli, who had been a Vatican diplomat in Vienna, was not electable and settled on Girolamo Maria Gotti instead.

=== First and second ballot ===
After the first day passed without balloting, the cardinals voted once each morning and once each afternoon. The first ballots were taken on morning of the second day of the conclave and the results were 24 for Rampolla, 17 for Gotti, 5 for Giuseppe Sarto. The second ballot held on the afternoon of the same day had 29 votes for Rampolla, 17 for Gotti, 10 for Sarto, and the others scattered.

Some of the Germans thought that Gotti's appeal was limited and decided to support Sarto as their best alternative to Rampolla, who otherwise appeared likely to win the two-thirds vote required, which was 42. As the cardinals were completing their third set of ballots on the morning of 2 August, Cardinal Jan Puzyna de Kosielsko, the prince-bishop of Kraków and a subject of Austria-Hungary, acting on instructions from Franz Joseph, Emperor of Austria, exercised the Emperor's right of jus exclusivae, that is, to veto one candidate. (Note: Three leading Catholic heads of state claimed the jus exclusivae: the King of France, the King of Spain, and the Holy Roman Emperor. The Emperor never explained his reasons, but it was likely provoked by Rampolla's policies as Secretary of State, especially his attempt to seek a rapprochement with the anticlerical government of the French Third Republic as Secretary of State. The Italian government, which had no veto, also resented the policies of Rampolla, a southern Italian, toward their government dominated by northern Italian interests.)

| Cardinals | Votes |
|---|---|
| Mariano Rampolla | 24 |
| Girolamo Maria Gotti | 17 |
| Giuseppe Sarto | 5 |
| Others | 16 |

| Cardinals | Votes |
|---|---|
| Mariano Rampolla | 29 |
| Girolamo Maria Gotti | 16 |
| Giuseppe Sarto | 10 |
| Others | 7 |

=== Third ballot ===
At first, there were objections, and some cardinals wanted to ignore the Emperor's communication. Then, Rampolla called it "an affront to the dignity of the Sacred College", but withdrew himself from consideration, saying that "With regard to my humble person, I declare that nothing could be more honorable, nothing more agreeable could have happened." Nevertheless, the third ballot showed no change in support for Rampolla, still with 29 votes, while the next two candidates had switched positions, with 21 for Sarto and 9 for Gotti. Several cardinals later wrote of their disgust at the Emperor's intervention, one writing that it left a "great, painful impression on all".

| Cardinals | Votes |
|---|---|
| Mariano Rampolla | 29 |
| Giuseppe Sarto | 21 |
| Girolamo Maria Gotti | 9 |
| Others | 3 |

=== Fourth ballot ===
The afternoon tested the remaining sympathy for Rampolla, who gained a single vote, while Sarto had 24 and Gotti fell to 3. The precise impact of the Emperor's intervention is difficult to assess, since Rampolla continued to have strong support for several ballots. Yet one contemporaneous assessment held that "After calm reflection, those who had voted for Rampolla up to this time had to consider that an election against the expressed wish of the Emperor of Austria would at once place the new pope in a most unpleasant position."

| Cardinals | Votes |
|---|---|
| Mariano Rampolla | 30 |
| Giuseppe Sarto | 24 |
| Girolamo Maria Gotti | 3 |
| Others | 5 |

=== Fifth, sixth and seventh ballot ===
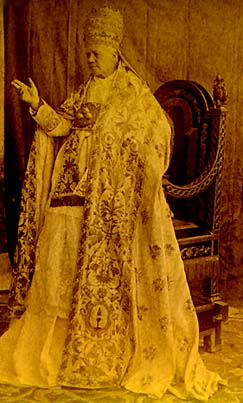
Pope Pius X (1903–1914) wearing the 1834 tiara of Pope Gregory XVI

The fifth ballot on the morning on the fourth day (3 August) showed Sarto leading with 27, Rampolla down to 24, and Gotti at 6, with a few still scattered. Sarto then announced that the cardinals should vote for someone else, that he did not have what was required of a pope. The movement toward Sarto continued in the afternoon in the sixth ballot: Sarto 35, Rampolla 16, Gotti 7. On the morning of 4 August, on the seventh ballot, the conclave elected Sarto with 50 votes, leaving 10 for Rampolla and 2 for Gotti.

| Cardinals | Votes |
|---|---|
| Giuseppe Sarto | 27 |
| Mariano Rampolla | 24 |
| Girolamo Maria Gotti | 6 |
| Others | 5 |

| Cardinals | Votes |
|---|---|
| Giuseppe Sarto | 35 |
| Mariano Rampolla | 16 |
| Girolamo Maria Gotti | 7 |
| Others | 4 |

| Cardinals | Votes |
|---|---|
| Giuseppe Sarto | 50 |
| Mariano Rampolla | 10 |
| Girolamo Maria Gotti | 2 |
| Others | 0 |

Before he was officially announced to the crowds, a priest got an inside tip that Sarto had been elected. He climbed up to a spot where he could be seen by the crowd, and then open and closed two fingers to represent a pair of scissors. This was understood by some to mean that Sarto, which means "tailor" in Italian, had been elected.

Sarto took the name Pius X. Following the practice of his two immediate predecessors since the 1870 invasion of Rome, Pius X gave his first Urbi et Orbi blessing on a balcony facing into St. Peter's Basilica rather than facing the crowds outside, a symbolic representation of his opposition to Italian rule of Rome and his demand for a return of the Papal States to his authority.

== Veto abolished ==
On 20 January 1904, less than six months after his election, Pius X issued the apostolic constitution Commissum Nobis, which prohibited the exercise of the jus exclusivae. Where previous popes had issued rules restricting outside influence on the cardinal electors, Pius X used more thorough and detailed language, prohibiting not only the assertion of the right to veto but even the expression of "a simple desire" to that effect. He set automatic excommunication as the penalty for violating his strictures. He also required conclave participants to swear an oath to abide by these rules and not allow any influence by "lay powers of any grade or order".

== See also ==
Cardinal electors by region
| Region | Number |
|---|---|
| Italy | 38 |
| Rest of Europe | 23 |
| North America | 1 |
| South America | 0 |
| Asia | 0 |
| Oceania | 0 |
| Africa | 0 |
| Total | 62 |

- Cardinal electors for the 1903 conclave
