= Sacred Congregation of Rites =

Former Congregation of the Roman Curia

The Sacred Congregation of Rites was a congregation of the Roman Curia, erected on 22 January 1588 by Pope Sixtus V by Immensa Aeterni Dei; it was divided into two separate congregations by Pope Paul VI on 8 May 1969.

The Congregation was charged with the supervision of the liturgy and the process of canonization of saints.

As part of the reforms following the Second Vatican Council, Pope Paul VI's 1969 apostolic constitution Sacra Rituum Congregatio divided the congregation into the Congregation for the Causes of Saints, and the Congregation for Divine Worship and the Discipline of the Sacraments.

== Prefects ==
- Flavio Chigi (1759–1771)
- Mario Marefoschi Compagnoni (1771–1785)
- Giulio Maria della Somaglia (1800–1814)
- Giorgio Doria Pamphilj Landi (1821–1837)
- Carlo Maria Pedicini (1837–1843)
- Ludovico Micara, OFM Cap (1843–1844)
- Luigi Lambruschini, B (1847–1854)
- Costantino Patrizi Naro (1854–1860)
- Luigi Bilio, B (1876–1877)
- Tommaso Martinelli, OSA (1877–1878)
- Domenico Bartolini (1878–1886)
- Angelo Bianchi (1887–1897)
- Carlo Laurenzi (1889–1895)
- Camillo Mazzella, SJ (1897–1900)
- Gaetano Aloisi Masella (1899–1902)
- Domenico Ferrata (1900–1902)
- Serafino Cretoni (1903–1909)
- Luigi Tripepi (1903–1906)
- Sebastiano Martinelli, OSA (1909–1918)
- Scipione Tecchi (1914–1915)
- Antonio Vico (1915–1929)
- Camillo Laurenti (1929–1938)
- Carlo Salotti (1938 – 24 October 1947)
- Clemente Micara (1950–1953)
- Gaetano Cicognani (1953–1956)
- Arcadio Larraona Saralegui, CMF (1962–1968)
- Benno Gut, OSB (1967–1969)

== See also ==
- Aloisio Gardellini
