= Domenico Ferrata =

Italian Roman Catholic Cardinal

His Eminence Domenico Ferrata
- Cardinal Secretary of State
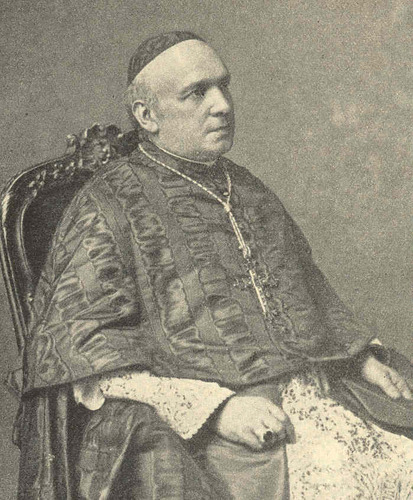
- Church: Roman Catholic Church
- Appointed: 4 September 1914
- Term ended: 10 October 1914
- Predecessor: Rafael Merry del Val de Zulueta
- Successor: Pietro Gasparri
- Other posts: Cardinal-Priest of Santa Prisca (1896–1914); Cardinal-Protector of the Pontifical Ecclesiastical Academy (1902–14); Prefect of the Congregation of the Sacraments (1908–14); Archpriest of the Basilica of Saint John Lateran (1913–14); Secretary of the Congregation of the Holy Office (1914)
- Previous posts: President of the Pontifical Ecclesiastical Academy (1884–85); Titular Archbishop of Thessalonica (1885–96); Secretary of the Congregation for Extraordinary Ecclesiastical Affairs (1889–91); Apostolic Nuncio to France (1891-96); Camerlengo of the College of Cardinals (1899–1900); Prefect of the Congregation of Indulgences and Sacred Relics (1899–1900); Prefect of the Congregation for Rites (1900–02); Prefect of the Congregation of Bishops and Regulars (1902–08)

Orders
- Ordination: 18 September 1869
- Consecration: 19 April 1885 by Lodovico Jacobini
- Created cardinal: 22 June 1896 by Pope Leo XIII
- Rank: Cardinal-Priest

Personal details
- Born: Domenico Ferrata; 4 March 1847 Gradoli, Montefiascone, Viterbo, Papal States
- Died: 10 October 1914 (aged 67) Rome, Kingdom of Italy
- Parents: Giovanni Battista Ferrata; Maria Antonuzzi
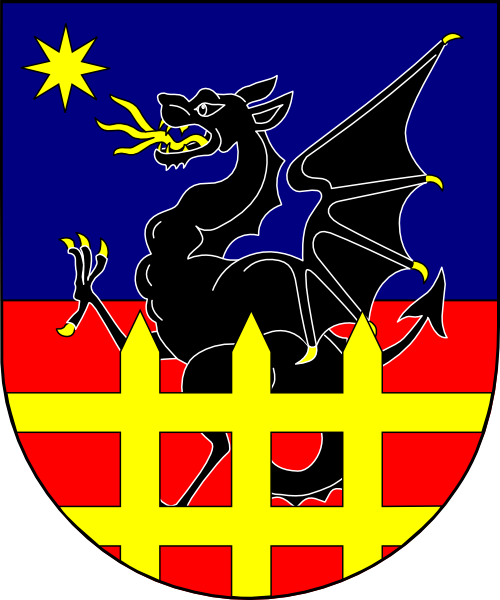
- Coat of arms

Domenico Ferrata JUD (4 March 1847 – 10 October 1914) was an Italian Roman Catholic cardinal who spent most of his career in the diplomatic service of the Holy See and in the Roman Curia.

== Life ==
Ferrata was born in Gradoli, near Viterbo to Giovan Battista and Maria Antonuzzi Ferrata, who had a small farm. He had a brother, Angelo, who later became procurator general of the Augustinians.

He first attended a local municipal school run by canon D. Collarini. Then he went to the Jesuit School of Orvieto. With the expulsion of the Jesuits from Orvieto, he spent the year 1860-61 in Gradoli, continuing however to study privately with Don GB Polverini. He then attended the Seminary of Montefiascone. Ferrata was appointed canon of the college of Gradoli. He took his degree in theology at La Sapienza in Rome, where he studied scripture under Tommaso Martinelli. Ferrata was ordained a priest in 1869.

== Career ==
After ordination, Ferrata studied canon law at S. Apollinare. He earned doctorates in both theology and civil and canon law. He then apprenticed at the Congregation of the Council. When Martelli became a cardinal in 1873, he made his former student his secretary. In January 1874, Ferrata was appointed procurator at the Sacred Congregation of Rites.

In 1876, he taught canon law at the Pontifical Roman Major Seminary, and the following year was made deputy chair of ecclesiastical history at Propaganda Fide. In April 1877, he was appointed to the Congregation for Extraordinary Ecclesiastical Affairs, which handled diplomatic relations between the Holy See and foreign governments. When in 1879 the secretary of the congregation, Włodzimierz Czacki was appointed nuncio to France, he took Ferrata along as auditor. He returned to Rome in 1883 and was sent to Switzerland to resolve problems with the diocese of Basel. In 1884, he was made president of the Pontifical Ecclesiastical Academy, the training school for the diplomatic corps.

Consecrated a bishop in 1885, he served as nuncio to Belgium. He served as Secretary of the Congregation for Extraordinary Ecclesiastical Affairs from 20 April 1889 to 23 June 1891, when he was named nuncio to France where he was to pursue a reconciliation between the Church and the French state. He was elevated to cardinal by Pope Leo XIII in the consistory of 22 June 1896 with the titular church of Santa Prisca, Rome.

He spent the early part of his cardinalate in positions such as Prefect of the Sacred Congregation for Indulgences and Sacred Relics. He was named Prefect of the Congregation for Divine Worship.

In 1900, he was named prefect of the Sacred Congregation of Rites which handled the process for canonizations. In that capacity he oversaw much of the procedure regarding the cause of Joan of Arc. He participated in the conclave of 1903, which elected Pope Pius X. In 1901, he was sent as nuncio to Paris by Pope Leo XIII with the mission to work for the reconciliation with the third French Republic.

As papal legate, he presided over the 1905 Canonical coronation of the image of the Immaculate Conception of Cospicua in Malta. Ferrata played an important part in the preparation of Quam singulari the 1910 decree concerning the admittance of children to communion. In 1913, he was named Archpriest of the patriarchal Lateran basilica. In the same year, he was appointed the Cardinal Legate for the XXIV International Eucharistic Congress in Malta.

In January 1914, Pope Pius X named him to succeed Mariano Cardinal Rampolla, who had died on 13 December 1913, as Secretary of the Sacred Congregation of the Holy Office.

Pope Pius X died on 20 August 1914. Ferrata opened the conclave on 31 August 1914, celebrating the Mass of the Holy Spirit in the Pauline Chapel. The newly elected Pope Benedict XV appointed Ferrata Secretary of State, in place of Rafael Merry del Val. However, Ferrata was already in ill health and died the month after his appointment at age 67. He was buried in Gradoli.

Catholic Church titles
| Preceded by Pietro Respighi | Archpriest of the Basilica of St. John Lateran; 7 April 1913 – 10 October 1914 | Succeeded by Basilio Pompili |
| Preceded by Mariano Rampolla del Tindaro | Secretary of the Supreme Sacred Congregation of the Holy Office; 3 January 1914 – 4 September 1914 | Succeeded by Rafael Merry del Val |
| Preceded by Rafael Merry del Val | Cardinal Secretary of State; 4 September – 10 October 1914 | Succeeded by Pietro Gasparri |
