= Cardinal electors for the 1903 conclave =

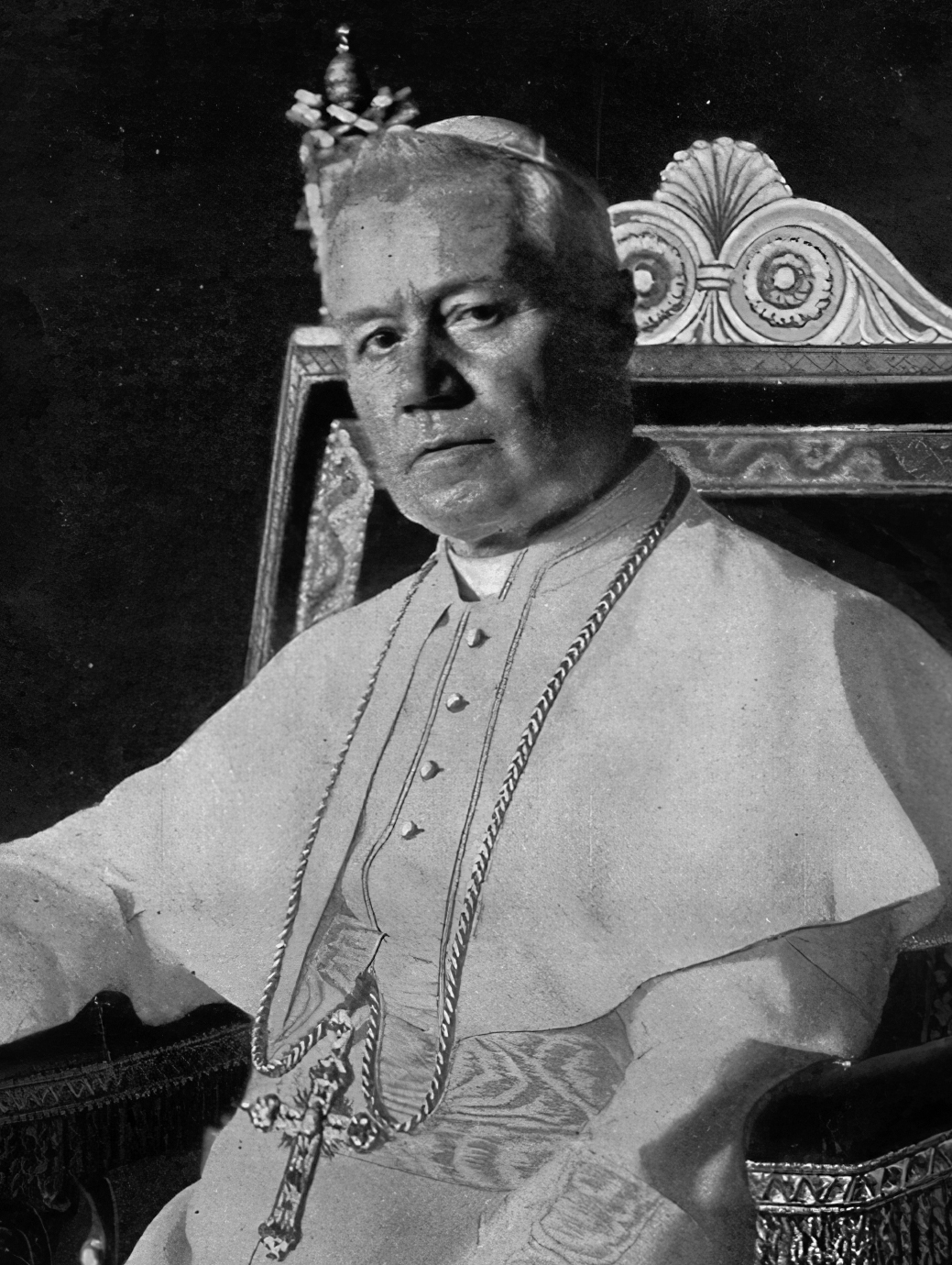
Cardinal Giuseppe Sarto was elected Pope Pius X by the 1903 conclave on August 4.

The conclave of 1903 was convened to elect a pope, the leader of the Catholic Church, to succeed Pope Leo XIII following his death on 20 July 1903.

Of the 64 members of the College of Cardinals at the time of Leo XIII's death, 62 participated in the subsequent conclave, the largest number to enter a conclave up until that time. Francis Patrick Moran arrived after the new pope had been elected, while Michelangelo Celesia was unable to participate due to ill health.

Of the 62 attending electors, 6 were cardinal bishops, 48 were cardinal priests, and 8 were cardinal deacons. Only the Dean, Luigi Oreglia di Santo Stefano, was a creation of Pope Pius IX, with the remaining 61 cardinals having been elevated by his successor Pope Leo XIII.

The oldest cardinal elector in the conclave was François-Marie-Benjamin Richard de la Vergne, at the age of 84, and the youngest was Lev Skrbenský z Hříště, at the age of 40.

This was the first conclave to host a representative from North America—James Gibbons, Archbishop of Baltimore—and the first to incorporate a non-European born cardinal since the 1471 papal conclave that featured Cardinal Bessarion of Trebizond.

The cardinal electors entered the Sistine Chapel to begin the conclave on 31 July 1903. On 4 August, after seven ballots over five days, they elected Cardinal Giuseppe Sarto, the Patriarch of Venice, who took the papal name Pius X.

== Cardinal electors ==
The table below is sorted by default in order of precedence of the cardinal electors, and contains information as of 20 July 1903, the date on which the Holy See became vacant. All cardinals listed were members of the Latin Church. Cardinals belonging to institutes of consecrated life or to societies of apostolic life are indicated by the relevant post-nominal letters.

* Elected pope

Rank	Name	Country	Born	Order	Consistory	Office
1	Luigi Oreglia di Santo Stefano	Italy	9 July 1828 (age 75)	CB	22 December 1873; Pius IX	Prefect of the Congregation of Ceremonies, and Camerlengo of the Apostolic Camera (Dean)
2	Serafino Vannutelli	Italy	26 November 1834 (age 68)	CB	14 March 1887; Leo XIII	Major Penitentiary of the Sacred Apostolic Penitentiary, and Secretary of the Supreme Sacred Congregation of the Holy Office (Vice-Dean)
3	Mario Mocenni	Italy	22 January 1823 (age 80)	CB	16 January 1893; Leo XIII	Substitute for General Affairs Emeritus of the Apostolic Secretariat
4	Antonio Agliardi	Italy	4 September 1832 (age 70)	CB	22 June 1896; Leo XIII	Vice-Chancellor of the Apostolic Chancery
5	Vincenzo Vannutelli	Italy	5 December 1836 (age 66)	CB	30 December 1889; Leo XIII	Prefect of the Sacred Congregation of the Council, and Archpriest of Santa Maria Maggiore
6	Francesco Satolli	Italy	21 July 1839 (age 63)	CB	29 November 1895; Leo XIII	Archpriest of Archbasilica of Saint John Lateran
7	José Sebastião de Almeida Neto OFMDisc	Portugal	8 February 1841 (age 62)	CP	24 March 1884; Leo XIII	Patriarch of Lisbon (Protopriest)
8	Alfonso Capecelatro di Castelpagano CO	Italy	5 February 1824 (age 79)	CP	27 July 1885; Leo XIII	Archbishop of Capua
9	Benoit-Marie Langénieux	France	15 October 1824 (age 78)	CP	7 June 1886; Leo XIII	Archbishop of Reims
10	James Gibbons	United States	23 July 1834 (age 68)	CP	7 June 1886; Leo XIII	Archbishop of Baltimore
11	Mariano Rampolla	Italy	17 August 1843 (age 59)	CP	14 March 1887; Leo XIII	Cardinal Secretary of State, Archpriest of the Papal Basilica of Saint Peter, and President of the Sacred Congregation of the Reverend Basilica of Saint Peter
12	François-Marie-Benjamin Richard de la Vergne	France	1 March 1819 (age 84)	CP	24 May 1889; Leo XIII	Archbishop of Paris
13	Pierre-Lambert Goossens	Belgium	18 July 1827 (age 76)	CP	24 May 1889; Leo XIII	Archbishop of Mechelen
14	Anton Joseph Gruscha	Austria-Hungary	3 November 1820 (age 82)	CP	1 June 1891; Leo XIII	Archbishop of Vienna
15	Angelo Di Pietro	Italy	22 May 1828 (age 75)	CP	16 January 1893; Leo XIII	Pro-Datary of His Holiness of the Apostolic Dataria
16	Michael Logue	United Kingdom	1 October 1840 (age 62)	CP	16 January 1893; Leo XIII	Archbishop of Armagh
17	Kolos Ferenc Vaszary OSB	Austria-Hungary	12 February 1832 (age 71)	CP	16 January 1893; Leo XIII	Archbishop of Esztergom
18	Georg von Kopp	Germany	25 July 1837 (age 65)	CP	16 January 1893; Leo XIII	Archbishop of Breslau
19	Adolphe Perraud CO	France	7 February 1828 (age 75)	CP	16 January 1893; Leo XIII	Bishop of Autun
20	Victor-Lucien-Sulpice Lécot	France	8 January 1831 (age 72)	CP	12 June 1893; Leo XIII	Archbishop of Bordeaux
21	Giuseppe Sarto	Italy	2 June 1835 (age 68)	CP	12 June 1893; Leo XIII	Patriarch of Venice
22	Ciriaco María Sancha y Hervás	Spain	17 June 1833 (age 70)	CP	18 May 1894; Leo XIII	Archbishop of Toledo
23	Domenico Svampa	Italy	13 June 1851 (age 52)	CP	18 May 1894; Leo XIII	Archbishop of Bologna
24	Andrea Carlo Ferrari	Italy	13 August 1850 (age 52)	CP	18 May 1894; Leo XIII	Archbishop of Milan
25	Girolamo Maria Gotti OCD	Italy	29 March 1834 (age 69)	CP	29 November 1895; Leo XIII	Prefect of the Sacred Congregation of the Propagation of the Faith
26	Achille Manara	Italy	20 November 1827 (age 75)	CP	29 November 1895; Leo XIII	Bishop of Ancona and Numana
27	Salvador Casañas y Pagés	Spain	5 September 1834 (age 68)	CP	29 November 1895; Leo XIII	Bishop of Barcelona
28	Domenico Ferrata	Italy	4 March 1847 (age 56)	CP	22 June 1896; Leo XIII	Prefect of the Sacred Congregation of Bishops and Regulars
29	Serafino Cretoni	Italy	4 September 1833 (age 69)	CP	22 June 1896; Leo XIII	Prefect of the Sacred Congregation of Rites
30	Giuseppe Antonio Ermenegildo Prisco	Italy	8 September 1833 (age 69)	CP	30 November 1896; Leo XIII	Bishop of Naples
31	José María Martín de Herrera y de la Iglesia	Spain	26 August 1835 (age 67)	CP	19 April 1897; Leo XIII	Archbishop of Santiago de Compostela
32	Pierre-Hector Coullié	France	14 March 1829 (age 74)	CP	19 April 1897; Leo XIII	Archbishop of Lyon
33	Guillaume-Marie-Joseph Labouré	France	27 October 1841 (age 61)	CP	19 April 1897; Leo XIII	Archbishop of Rennes
34	Giovanni Battista Casali del Drago	Italy	30 January 1838 (age 65)	CP	19 June 1899; Leo XIII	Camerlengo Emeritus of the Sacred College of Cardinals
35	Francesco di Paola Cassetta	Italy	12 August 1841 (age 61)	CP	19 June 1899; Leo XIII	Camerlengo Emeritus of the Sacred College of Cardinals
36	Alessandro Sanminiatelli Zabarella	Italy	4 August 1840 (age 62)	CP	19 June 1899; Leo XIII	Camerlengo of the Sacred College of Cardinals
37	Gennaro Portanova	Italy	11 October 1845 (age 57)	CP	19 June 1899; Leo XIII	Archbishop of Reggio Calabria
38	Giuseppe Francica-Nava di Bontifé	Italy	23 July 1846 (age 56)	CP	19 June 1899; Leo XIII	Archbishop of Catania
39	François-Désiré Mathieu	France	28 May 1839 (age 64)	CP	19 June 1899; Leo XIII	Archbishop Emeritus of Toulouse
40	Pietro Respighi	Italy	22 September 1843 (age 59)	CP	19 June 1899; Leo XIII	Vicar General for the Vicariate of Rome
41	Agostino Richelmy	Italy	29 November 1850 (age 52)	CP	19 June 1899; Leo XIII	Archbishop of Turin
42	Sebastiano Martinelli OESA	Italy	20 August 1848 (age 54)	CP	15 April 1901; Leo XIII	Apostolic Delegate Emeritus to the United States
43	Casimiro Gennari	Italy	19 December 1839 (age 63)	CP	15 April 1901; Leo XIII	Assessor Emeritus of the Commission of Roman and Universal Inquisition
44	Lev Skrbenský z Hříště	Austria-Hungary	12 June 1863 (age 40)	CP	15 April 1901; Leo XIII	Archbishop of Prague
45	Giulio Boschi	Italy	2 March 1838 (age 65)	CP	15 April 1901; Leo XIII	Archbishop of Ferrara
46	Jan Puzyna de Kosielsko	Austria-Hungary	13 September 1842 (age 60)	CP	15 April 1901; Leo XIII	Bishop of Kraków
47	Bartolomeo Bacilieri	Italy	28 March 1842 (age 61)	CP	15 April 1901; Leo XIII	Bishop of Verona
48	Carlo Nocella	Italy	15 November 1826 (age 76)	CP	22 June 1903; Leo XIII	Latin Patriarch Emeritus of Constantinople, and Secretary Emeritus of Sacred Consistorial Congregation
49	Beniamino Cavicchioni	Italy	17 December 1836 (age 66)	CP	22 June 1903; Leo XIII	Secretary of the Sacred Congregation of the Council
50	Andrea Aiuti	Italy	17 June 1849 (age 54)	CP	22 June 1903; Leo XIII	Apostolic Nuncio to Portugal
51	Emidio Taliani	Italy	19 April 1838 (age 65)	CP	22 June 1903; Leo XIII	Apostolic Nuncio to Austria-Hungary
52	Sebastián Herrero y Espinosa de los Monteros CO	Spain	20 January 1822 (age 81)	CP	22 June 1903; Leo XIII	Archbishop of Valencia
53	Johannes Katschthaler	Austria-Hungary	29 May 1832 (age 71)	CP	22 June 1903; Leo XIII	Archbishop of Salzburg
54	Anton Hubert Fischer	Germany	30 May 1840 (age 63)	CP	22 June 1903; Leo XIII	Archbishop of Cologne
55	Luigi Macchi	Italy	3 March 1832 (age 71)	CD	11 February 1889; Leo XIII	Prefect Emeritus of the Prefecture of the Holy Apostolic Palaces (Protodeacon)
56	Andreas Steinhuber SJ	Germany	11 November 1824 (age 78)	CD	16 January 1893; Leo XIII	Prefect of the Sacred Congregation of the Index
57	Francesco Segna	Italy	31 August 1836 (age 66)	CD	18 May 1894; Leo XIII	Archivist of the Vatican Secret Archives
58	Raffaele Pierotti OP	Italy	1 January 1836 (age 67)	CD	30 November 1896; Leo XIII	Master of the Sacred Apostolic Palace Emeritus
59	Francesco Salesio Della Volpe	Italy	20 December 1844 (age 58)	CD	19 June 1899; Leo XIII	Prefect Emeritus of the Prefecture of the Holy Apostolic Palaces
60	José de Calasanz Vives y Tutó OFMCap	Spain	15 February 1854 (age 49)	CD	19 June 1899; Leo XIII	Cardinal Deacon of Sant'Adriano al Foro
61	Luigi Tripepi	Italy	21 June 1836 (age 67)	CD	15 April 1901; Leo XIII	Prefect of the Sacred Congregation of Indulgences and Sacred Relics
62	Felice Cavagnis	Italy	15 January 1841 (age 62)	CD	15 April 1901; Leo XIII	Secretary Emeritus of Sacred Congregation for Extraordinary Ecclesiastical Affairs

=== Not in attendance ===
Rank	Name	Country	Born	Order	Consistory	Office	Reason for absence
1	Michelangelo Celesia OSB Cas	Italy	13 January 1814 (age 89)	CP	10 November 1884; Leo XIII	Archbishop of Palermo	Illness
2	Francis Patrick Moran	Australia (Note: Moran was born in Ireland and has served in Australia since 1884.)	16 December 1830 (age 72)	CP	27 July 1885; Leo XIII	Archbishop of Sydney	Did not arrive in time

== Cardinal electors by country ==
* Country of elected pope

Cardinal electors by country
Country	Continent	Number
Austria-Hungary	Europe	5
Belgium	Europe	1
France	Europe	7
Germany	Europe	3
Italy*	Europe	38
Portugal	Europe	1
Spain	Europe	5
United Kingdom	Europe	1
United States	North America	1
Total		62

== See also ==
- Cardinals created by Pius IX
- Cardinals created by Leo XIII
- Cardinal electors for the 1914 conclave
