= Basilio Pompili =

Italian cardinal (1858–1931)

His Eminence Basilio Pompili
- Vicar General of Rome
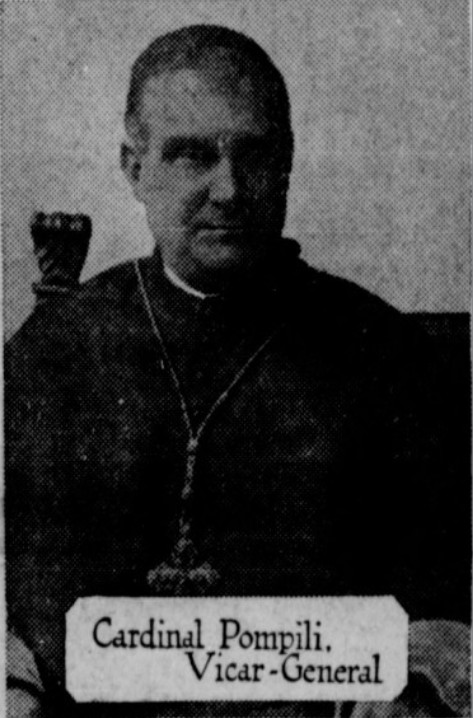
- Church: Roman Catholic Church
- Appointed: 7 April 1913
- Term ended: 5 May 1931
- Predecessor: Pietro Respighi
- Successor: Francesco Marchetti Selvaggiani
- Other posts: Archpriest of the Basilica of Saint John Lateran (1914–31); Cardinal-Bishop of Velletri (1917–31); President of the Pontifical Commission for Sacred Archaeology (1925–31); Vice-Dean of the College of Cardinals (1930–31)
- Previous posts: Secretary of the Congregation of the Council (1908–11); Cardinal-Deacon of Santa Maria in Domnica (1911–14); Titular Archbishop of Philippi (1913); Cardinal-Priest of Santa Maria in Ara Coeli (1914–17); Camerlengo of the College of Cardinals (1919–20)

Orders
- Ordination: 15 December 1885
- Consecration: 11 May 1913 by Antonio Agliardi
- Created cardinal: 27 November 1911 by Pope Pius X
- Rank: Cardinal-deacon (1911–1914); Cardinal-priest (1914–1917); Cardinal-bishop (1917–1931)

Personal details
- Born: Basilio Pompili; 16 April 1858 Spoleto, Papal States
- Died: 5 May 1931 (aged 73) Rome, Kingdom of Italy
- Buried: Campo Verano (1931–33); Spoleto Cathedral
- Education: Pontifical Roman Seminary
- Coat of arms

Basilio Pompili (16 April 1858 – 5 May 1931) was an Italian Catholic prelate who served as Vicar General of Rome from 1913 until his death. He was elevated to the cardinalate in 1911.

== Biography ==
Basilio Pompili was born in Spoleto, and studied at the Pontifical Roman Seminary before being ordained to the priesthood on 5 December 1886. He then did pastoral work in Rome from 1888 to 1904. During that time, Pompili was made auditor of the Sacred Congregation of the Council in 1891, an official in the Apostolic Penitentiary in 1896, and prelate adjunct of the Congregation of the council on 16 March 1898. He was raised to the rank of a protonotary apostolic on 18 December 1899, and was named auditor of the Roman Rota on 18 July 1904. During his time at the Roman Rota, Pompili sat at the sixth trial for the annulment of Paul Ernest Boniface and Anna Gould.

Pompili later returned to the Congregation of the Council upon becoming its secretary on 31 January 1908. As secretary, he served as the second-highest official of that dicastery, successively under Cardinals Vincenzo Vannutelli and Casimiro Gennari. Before becoming a bishop, Pompili was created cardinal deacon of Santa Maria in Domnica by Pope Pius X in the consistory of 27 November 1911. Pius X later named him Vicar General of Rome, and thus in charge of the pastoral of the Diocese of Rome, on 7 April 1913.

On 5 May 1913, Pompili was appointed Titular Archbishop of Philippi. He received his episcopal consecration on the following 11 May from Cardinal Antonio Agliardi, with Archbishop Donato Sbarretti and Bishop Americo Bevilacqua serving as co-consecrators, in the church of S. Vincenzo de' Paoli alla Bocca della Verità. In late May 1914, Pompili opted to become a cardinal-priest, with the title of Santa Maria in Aracoeli. He then participated in the conclave of 1914, which elected Pope Benedict XV, and was named archpriest of the Lateran Basilica on 28 October 1914.

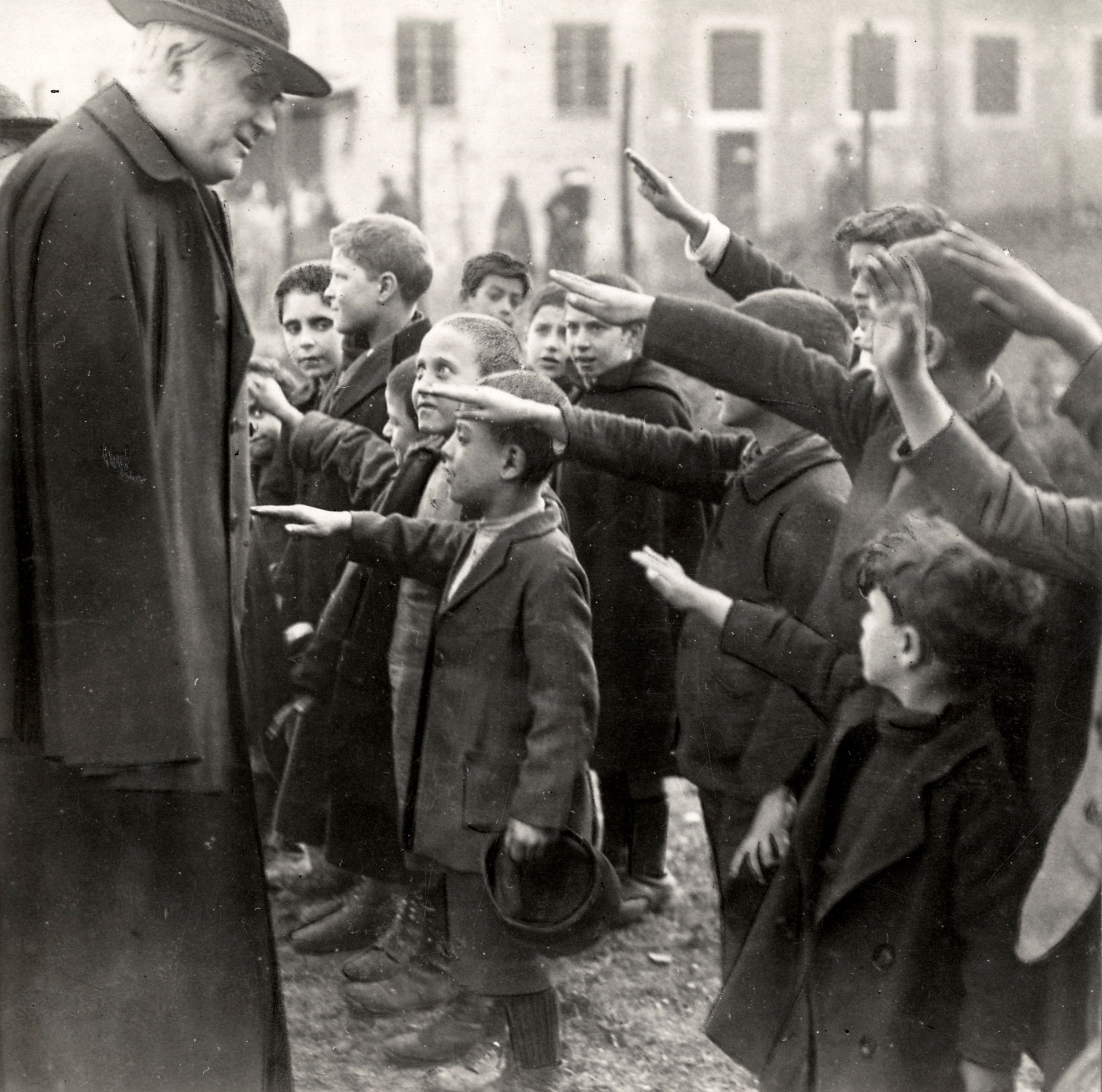
Pompili greeted by schoolchildren (1926)

The cardinal vicar was elevated to Cardinal Bishop of Velletri-Segni on 22 March 1917, and was one of the cardinal electors in another conclave, that of 1922, resulting in the election of Pope Pius XI. In 1923, he exchanged visits with Filippo Cremonesi, a royal commissioner, who served as mayor of Rome from 1922 to 1926. Among other events, Pompili served as papal legate to the opening (24 December 1924) and closing (24 December 1925) of the holy door at the Lateran Basilica. On 9 July 1930, he was made Vice-dean of the College of Cardinals, remaining in that position until his death.

Pompili died in Rome, at age 73. He was initially buried at the Campo Verano cemetery, but his remains were later transferred to the Cathedral of his native Spoleto on 18 December 1933.

== Trivia ==
- Pompili was a onetime athlete.
- From 1919 to 1920, he was camerlengo of the Sacred College of Cardinals.

== Episcopal lineage ==
Pompili's episcopal lineage, or apostolic succession was:

- Cardinal Scipione Rebiba
- Cardinal Giulio Antonio Santorio
- Cardinal Girolamo Bernerio
- Archbishop Galeazzo Sanvitale
- Cardinal Ludovico Ludovisi
- Cardinal Luigi Caetani
- Cardinal Ulderico Carpegna
- Cardinal Paluzzo Paluzzi Altieri degli Albertoni
- Pope Benedict XIII
- Pope Benedict XIV
- Cardinal Enrico Enríquez
- Archbishop Manuel Quintano Bonifaz
- Cardinal Buenaventura Fernández de Córdoba Spínola
- Cardinal Giuseppe Doria Pamphili
- Pope Pius VIII
- Pope Pius IX
- Cardinal Alessandro Franchi
- Cardinal Giovanni Simeoni
- Cardinal Antonio Agliardi
- Cardinal Basilio Pompili

Catholic Church titles
Preceded by Gaetano de Lai	Secretary of the Sacred Congregation for the Council; 31 January 1908 – 27 November 1911	Succeeded by Oreste Giorgi
Preceded by Pietro Respighi	Vicar General of Rome; 7 April 1913 – 5 May 1931	Succeeded by Francesco Marchetti-Selvaggiani
Preceded by Gennaro Granito Pignatelli di Belmonte	Camerlengo of the Sacred College of Cardinals; 1919–1920	Succeeded by Giulio Boschi
Preceded by unknown	President of the Pontifical Commission for Sacred Archaeology; 1925 – 5 May 1931	Succeeded by Francesco Marchetti-Selvaggiani
Preceded by Gennaro Granito Pignatelli di Belmonte	Vice-Dean of the College of Cardinals; 9 July 1930 – 5 May 1931	Succeeded by Michele Lega
