= Cardinal Vannutelli =

Cardinal Vannutelli may refer to:

- Serafino Vannutelli (1834–1915), Italian Roman Catholic cardinal, older brother of Vincenzo
- Vincenzo Vannutelli (1836–1930), Italian Roman Catholic cardinal, younger brother of Serafino
