= Carlo Nocella =

Italian Catholic cardinal

His Eminence Carlo Nocella
- Cardinal-Priest of San Callisto
- Church: Roman Catholic Church
- Appointed: 25 June 1903
- Term ended: 22 July 1908
- Predecessor: Agostino Ciasca
- Successor: Antonio Vico
- Previous posts: Protonary Apostolic de numero of the Prefecture of the Holy Apostolic Palaces (1874-99); Secretary of the Consistorial Congregation (1892-1903); Latin Patriarch of Antioch (1899-1901); Latin Patriarch of Constantinople (1901-03)

Orders
- Ordination: 2 September 1849
- Consecration: 16 July 1899 by Mariano Rampolla del Tindaro
- Created cardinal: 22 June 1903 by Pope Leo XIII
- Rank: Cardinal-Priest

Personal details
- Born: Carlo Nocella; 25 November 1826 Rome, Papal States
- Died: 22 July 1908 (aged 81) Rome, Kingdom of Italy
- Buried: Campo Verano
- Parents: Vincenzo Nocella; Maria Salvati
- Education: Pontifical Roman Athenaeum Saint Apollinare

Styles of Carlo Nocella
- Reference style: His Eminence
- Spoken style: Your Eminence
- Informal style: Cardinal
- See: Constantinople

Carlo Nocella (25 November 1826 – 22 July 1908) was an Italian cardinal. He was Secretary of the Sacred Consistorial Congregation (1892–1899), Latin Patriarch of Antioch (1899–1901), and Latin Patriarch of Constantinople (1901–1903).

== Biography ==
Nocella was born in Rome and studied at the Pontifical Roman Athenaeum S. Apollinare, from where he obtained a doctorate in canon and civil law. Ordained a priest on 2 September 1849, he joined the faculty of the Pontifical Roman Athenaeum S. Apollinare and later became Secretary of Latin Letters, canon of the Liberian Basilica and of St. Peter's Basilica, and protonotary apostolic de numero participantium. He was named Secretary of Briefs to the Princes on 5 December 1884, and Secretary of the Sacred Consistorial Congregation on 21 March 1892.

On 22 June 1899, Nocella was appointed Latin Patriarch of Antioch by Pope Leo XIII. He received his episcopal consecration on the following 16 July from Cardinal Mariano Rampolla, with Archbishops Felice Maria de Neckere and Casimiro Gennari, at the altar of the Chair of Peter in St. Peter's Basilica. He was transferred to the Latin Patriarchate of Constantinople on 18 April 1901.

Leo XIII created him Cardinal Priest of S. Callisto in the consistory of 22 June 1903. He participated in the 1903 papal conclave, which elected Pope Pius X. Nocella died in Rome, aged 81; he is buried in Campo Verano cemetery.

Catholic Church titles
Preceded by Carmine Gori-Merosi	Secretary of the Sacred Consistorial Congregation; 1892—1899	Succeeded by Gaetano de Lai
Preceded by Francesco di Paola Cassetta	Latin Patriarch of Antioch; 1899—1901	Succeeded by Lorenzo Passarini
Preceded by Alessandro Sanminiatelli Zabarella	Latin Patriarch of Constantinople; 1901—1903	Succeeded by Giuseppe Ceppetelli
