= Francesco Marchetti Selvaggiani =

Italian cardinal (1871–1951)

His Eminence Francesco Marchetti Selvaggiani
- Prefect of the Congregation of Ceremonies
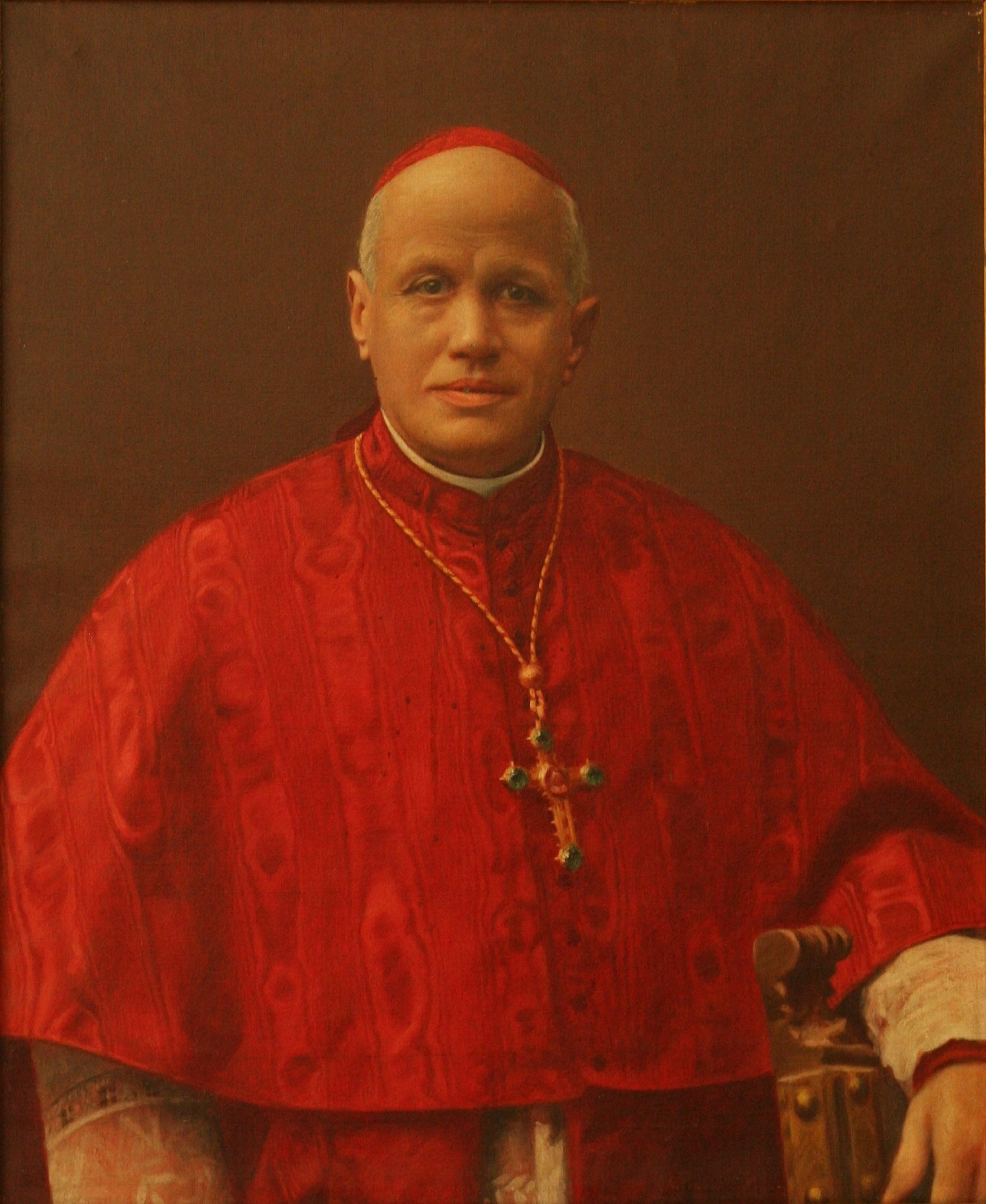
- Church: Roman Catholic Church
- Appointed: 5 May 1948
- Term ended: 13 January 1951
- Predecessor: Gennaro Granito Pignatelli di Belmonte
- Successor: Eugène-Gabriel-Gervais-Laurent Tisserant
- Other posts: Cardinal-Bishop of Frascati (1936–1951); Cardinal-Bishop of Ostia (1948–1951); Vicar General of Rome (1931–1951); Secretary of the Congregation of the Holy Office (1939–1951); Archpriest of the Arcibasilica di San Giovanni in Laterano (1931–1951); Dean of the College of Cardinals (1948–1951)
- Previous posts: Titular Archbishop of Seleucia in Isauria (1918–1930); Apostolic Internuncio to Venezuela (1918–1920); Apostolic Nuncio to Venezuela (1920); Apostolic Nuncio to Austria (1920–1922); Secretary of the Congregation for Propagation of the Faith (1922–1939); Cardinal-Priest of Santa Maria Nuova (1930–1936)

Orders
- Ordination: 4 April 1896 by Francesco di Paola Cassetta
- Consecration: 14 April 1918 by Pietro Gasparri
- Created cardinal: 30 June 1930 by Pius XI
- Rank: Cardinal-bishop

Personal details
- Born: 1 October 1871 Rome
- Died: 13 January 1951 (aged 79) Rome
- Denomination: Roman Catholic
- Coat of arms

Styles of Francesco Marchetti-Selvaggiani
- Reference style: His Eminence
- Spoken style: Your Eminence
- Informal style: Cardinal
- See: Frascati (suburbicarian), Ostia (suburbicarian)

Francesco Marchetti Selvaggiani (1 October 1871 – 13 January 1951) was an Italian Catholic prelate who served as Secretary of the Congregation for the Propagation of the Faith, Vicar General of His Holiness, Secretary of the Holy Office, and Dean of the College of Cardinals. He was elevated to the cardinalate in 1930.

== Biography ==
=== Early life and ordination ===
Marchetti Selvaggiani was born in Rome to Vincenzo and Valeria (née Caretti) Marchetti Selvaggiani. A boyhood friend of Eugenio Pacelli (the future Pope Pius XII), he studied at the Almo Collegio Capranica and Pontifical Gregorian University. Marchetti Selvaggiani was ordained to the priesthood by Archbishop Francesco di Paola Cassetta on 4 April 1896.

=== Roman Curia ===
He then served in the Congregation for Extraordinary Ecclesiastical Affairs, as a minutante, until 1900. From 1900 to 1906, he was auditor of the Apostolic Delegation to the United States in Washington, D.C. He was attached to the secretariat of the Congregation for Extraordinary Ecclesiastical Affairs for a year before becoming auditor of the Apostolic Nunciature to Germany in 1907. Marchetti Selvaggiani was named privy chamberlain of his holiness on 25 December 1914, domestic prelate of his holiness on 7 July 1915, and protonotary apostolic on 26 September 1917. From 1915 to 1918, he was a confidential representative of the Holy See in Bern, Switzerland.

=== Nuncio ===
On 16 February 1918, he was appointed Internuncio to Venezuela and Titular Archbishop of Seleucia di Isauria. He received his episcopal consecration in the chapel of the Pontifical Latin American College on the following 14 April from Cardinal Pietro Gasparri, with Archbishops Carlo Pietropaoli and Bonaventura Cerretti serving as co-consecrators. With the raising in rank of the papal diplomatic mission to Venezuela and of the Venezuelan mission to the Holy See, he became nuncio on 21 May 1920. On 4 December of the same year, he became Apostolic Nuncio to Austria.

=== Congregation for the Evangelization of Peoples ===
He was made secretary of the Congregation for the Propagation of the Faith on 15 December 1922. As secretary, he served as the second-highest official of that dicastery under Cardinal Willem van Rossum, CSSR. In addition to his role as secretary, he served as an extraordinary papal envoy to Haile Selassie I, Emperor of Ethiopia.

=== Cardinal ===
Pope Pius XI created him Cardinal-Priest of S. Maria Nuova in the consistory of 30 June 1930. In late 1930, in response to a growing Protestant presence in Rome, he was also appointed to head the Pontifical Organization for Preservation of the Faith and for the Provision of New Churches in Rome. On 9 May 1931, Marchetti Selvaggiani was named the Vicar General of Rome; as vicar general, he governed the Diocese of Rome in the name of the pope, who is Bishop of Rome. He advised local priests to avoid theaters and sports games. He became Archpriest of the Lateran Basilica on 26 May 1931, and Cardinal Bishop of Frascati on 15 June 1936.

=== Secretary of the Holy Office ===
Just after Pope Pius XII was elected in 1939, Cardinal Donato Sbarretti, head of the Holy Office, died, and Pius named Cardinal Marchetti-Selvaggiani to the position. On becoming the senior cardinal-bishop in 1948, Marchetti-Selvaggiani became dean of the Sacred College and Bishop of Ostia in addition to his first bishopric see. He also succeeded as prefect of the Sacred Congregation Ceremonial, and continued in all these positions until his death.

=== Death ===
Selvaggiani died from a cerebral thrombosis in Rome, at age 79. He is buried in Campo Verano.

== Sources ==
- Catholic Hierarchy
- Cardinals of the Holy Roman Church

Diplomatic posts
| Preceded by Giulio Tonti | Apostolic Nuncio to Venezuela; 16 February 1918 – 4 December 1920 | Succeeded by Fernando Cento |
| Preceded by Teodoro Valfre di Bonzo | Apostolic Nuncio to Austria; 4 December 1920 – 15 December 1922 | Succeeded by Enrico Sibilia |
Catholic Church titles
| Preceded by Basilio Cardinal Pompili | Vicar General of His Holiness for the Diocese of Rome; 1931–1951 | Succeeded by Clemente Cardinal Micara |
| Preceded by Gennaro Granito Pignatelli di Belmonte | Dean of the College of Cardinals; 16 February 1948 – 13 January 1951 | Succeeded by Eugène-Gabriel-Gervais-Laurent Tisserant |
| Preceded by Donato Sbarretti | Secretary of the Supreme Sacred Congregation of the Holy Office; 30 April 1939 – 13 January 1951 | Succeeded by Giuseppe Pizzardo |
