= Luigi Galimberti =

Italian prelate, academic and journalist

His Eminence Luigi Galimberti
- Archivist of the Vatican Secret Archives
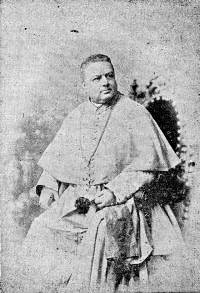
- Cardinal Galimberti pictured in 1893.
- Church: Roman Catholic Church
- Appointed: 25 June 1894
- Term ended: 7 May 1896
- Predecessor: Luigi Tripepi
- Successor: Francesco Segna
- Other post: Cardinal-Priest of Santi Nereo ed Achilleo (1893-96)
- Previous posts: Secretary of the Congregation for Extraordinary Ecclesiastical Affairs (1885-86); Secretary of the Congregation for Extraordinary Ecclesiastical Affairs (1886-87); Titular Archbishop of Nicæa (1887-93); Apostolic Nuncio to Austria-Hungary (1887-93)

Orders
- Ordination: 18 December 1858
- Consecration: 5 June 1887 by Cölestin Josef Ganglbauer
- Created cardinal: 16 January 1893 by Pope Leo XIII
- Rank: Cardinal-Priest

Personal details
- Born: Luigi Galimberti; 26 April 1836 Rome, Papal States
- Died: 7 May 1896 (aged 60) Rome, Kingdom of Italy
- Buried: Campo Verano
- Parents: Angelo Galimberti; Angela Bourbon del Monte Quatrassi

Luigi Galimberti (26 April 1836 – 7 May 1896) was an Italian prelate of the Catholic Church who had a varied career as an academic and theologian, journalist, diplomat, and Vatican official. He became an archbishop in 1887 and a cardinal in 1893. He was considered a candidate for the papacy when he died at the age of 60.

== Biography ==
Luigi Galimberti was born in Rome on 26 April 1836, the son of a family of lawyers; his mother was the second cousin of Pope Leo XIII. He attended the Roman Seminary, where he earned degrees in philosophy in 1854 and theology in 1858. He was ordained a priest on 18 December 1858 and then earned a degree in civil and canon law in 1861. From 1861 to 1878, he was professor of theology at the Pontifical Urban University. He became a canon of the Lateran Basilica in 1868.

He launched his career as a journalist and polemicist in 1870, working with Catholic magazines. In the run-up to the conclave of 1878, he and Cardinal Alessandro Franchi promoted the candidacy of Vincenzo Pecci–who proved to be the successful candidate–to other journalists. He was promoted to director of the Journal de Rome at the end of 1881, but he fell out with its management, and in October 1882, he founded the Moniteur de Rome to serve as a vehicle for his politically moderate views.

His moderate views on Italian nationalism and relations between the Holy See and Italy had been out of favor while Pius IX was pope; he gained favor under Leo XIII. He was named a canon of St. Peter's Basilica in 1883 and an Apostolic Protonotary.

On 28 June 1886, Pope Leo XIII appointed him secretary of the Congregation for Extraordinary Ecclesiastical Affairs. In 1887 he took part in the difficult negotiations in Berlin to end the Kulturkampf. The resulting reconciliation between the Holy See and the German Empire, and Galimberti's apparent sympathy for the Triple Alliance of Germany, Austria-Hungary, and Italy, earned him the distrust of the French, which may have prevented his appointment as Secretary of State following the death of Cardinal Luigi Jacobini in February 1887, though Galimberti had taken on the role of Secretary of State from October 1886 to May 1887, during Jacobini's illness and immediately after his death.

On 23 May 1887, he was appointed titular archbishop of Nicaea and Apostolic Nuncio to Austria-Hungary. He received his episcopal consecration from Cardinal Cölestin Josef Ganglbauer, Archbishop of Vienna, on 5 June. He was credited with the appointment of a candidate the Holy See favoured as Primate of Hungary and of a Pole rather than a German as archbishop of Gniezno-Posen.

In Vienna, Galimberti proved a ready conduit of information to his German counterpart there. In 1889, following the double suicide of the Austrian Crown Prince Rudolf and his mistress at Mayerling, Galimberti kept the German ambassador apprised of the latest information on the case, what one historian calls "highly placed gossip", and he continued to answer related inquiries about the Vatican's rumored denial of Rudolf's request for an annulment of his marriage. Galimberti's name figures in the many investigations of the case, usually in a minor role, though one early account said that Galimberti had received Rudolf's annulment request and rather than forward it to Rome had it delivered to the Emperor, provoking a family quarrel and the deaths that followed.

On 16 January 1893, Pope Leo made him a cardinal and on 15 June gave him the title cardinal priest of Santi Nereo e Achilleo. On 25 June 1894, Galimberti was named head of the Vatican Secret Archives. He was considered a possible future pope.

He died from a throat ailment in Rome on 7 May 1896 at the age of 60. (Note: The New York Times reported he died in Süchteln near Düsseldorf.) He was interred in the chapel of the Congregation for the Propagation of the Faith in Rome's Campo Verano cemetery.

== Writings ==
- Apologia pro Marcellino Romano pontefice (1876)
- Introductio philosophica ad historiam universam (1877)
- Lutero e il socialismo (1879)
- Leone XIII e la storia. Risposta a R. Bonghi d'un prelato romano (1883)
