= Andreas Steinhuber =

His Eminence Andreas Steinhuber S.J.
- Prefect of the Congregation of the Index
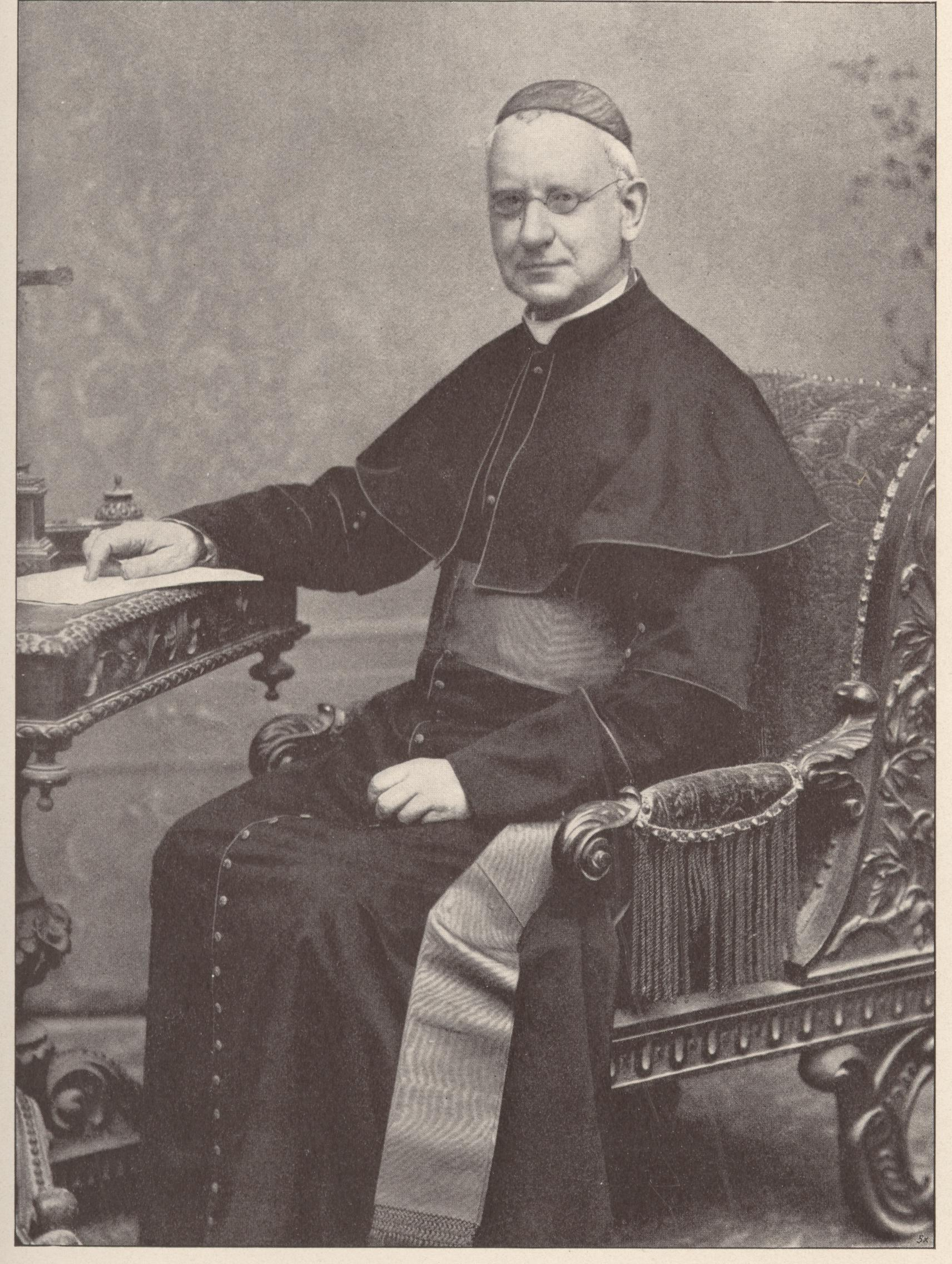
- Steinhuber pictured in 1900.
- Church: Roman Catholic Church
- Appointed: 1 October 1896
- Term ended: 15 October 1907
- Predecessor: Serafino Vannutelli
- Successor: Francesco Segna
- Other posts: Cardinal-Deacon of Sant'Agata alla Suburra (1894-1907); Protodeacon of the College of Cardinals (1907.03.29 – 1907.10.15)
- Previous post: Prefect of the Congregation for Indulgences and Sacred Relics (1895-96)

Orders
- Created cardinal: 16 January 1893 ("in pectore"); 18 May 1894 (revealed) by Pope Leo XIII
- Rank: Cardinal-Deacon

Personal details
- Born: Andreas Steinhuber; 11 November 1824 Uttlau, Haarbach, Kingdom of Bavaria
- Died: 15 October 1907 (aged 82) Rome, Kingdom of Italy
- Buried: Campo Verano
- Parents: Chrysant Steinhuber; Elisabeth Hölzel
- Education: Collegio Teutonico

Andreas Steinhuber, S.J. (11 November 1824 – 15 October 1907) was a German prelate of the Catholic Church who worked in education as a teacher and administrator, was made a cardinal in 1893, and then held senior positions in the Roman Curia. He was a forceful opponent of modernism in the Catholic Church and in wider society.

== Biography ==
Andreas Steinhuber was born on 11 November 1824 in Uttlau in the Kingdom of Bavaria. He studied from 1845 to 1854 at the seminary in Passau and at the Collegium Germanicum in Rome. He joined the Jesuits in 1854. The date of his ordination as a priest is unknown.

From 1859 to 1867 he taught theology in Innsbruck. In 1867 he became rector of the Collegium Germanicum. He also held consulting positions with the Congregation for the Propagation of the Faith and the Congregation of the Inquisition.

On 16 January 1893, Pope Leo XIII created him a cardinal in pectore. Pope Leo made his rank public on 18 May 1894 as Cardinal Deacon of Sant'Agata de' Goti.

From 12 December 1895, he was prefect of the Congregation for Indulgences and Sacred Relics. On 1 October 1896 he became prefect of the Congregation of the Index, and in 1902 a member of the Sanctum Officium. In 1904 he was named to the preparatory commission for codification of canon law. He participated in the 1903 conclave that elected Pope Pius X. In 1907 he became the Cardinal Protodeacon, the cardinal deacon with the longest tenure.

Steinhuber was considered a determined opponent of modernism within the Church and is said to have contributed significantly to the encyclical Pascendi Dominici gregis, a denunciation of modernism that Pope Pius X published on 8 September 1907. In 1900, the New York Times said he "ranks among the most radical members" of the College of Cardinals in his dedication to traditional forms of church music.

He died in Rome on 15 October 1907 and was buried in the Campo Verano cemetery.
