= Gennaro Granito Pignatelli di Belmonte =

Italian cardinal

His Eminence Gennaro Granito Pignatelli di Belmonte
- Prefect of the Congregation for Ceremonies
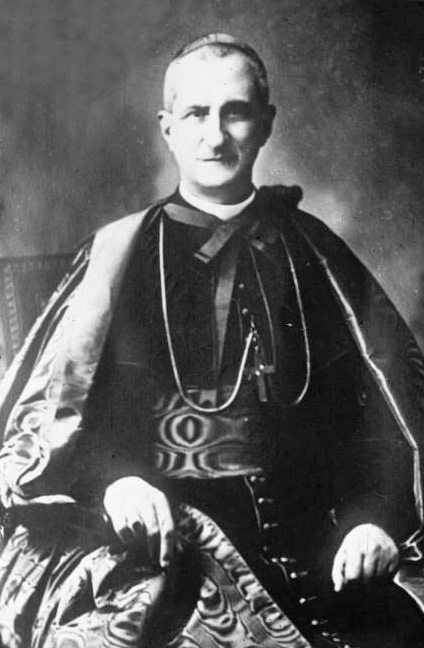
- Granito Pignatelli di Belmonte in 1922
- Church: Roman Catholic Church
- Appointed: 14 July 1930
- Term ended: 16 February 1948
- Predecessor: Vincenzo Vannutelli
- Successor: Francesco Marchetti Selvaggiani
- Other posts: Cardinal-Bishop of Albano (1915–1948); Cardinal-Bishop of Ostia (1930–1948); Dean of the College of Cardinals (1930–1948)
- Previous posts: Apostolic Nuncio to Belgium (1899–1904); Titular Archbishop of Edessa (1899–1911); Apostolic Nuncio to Austria-Hungary (1904–1911); Cardinal-Priest of Santa Maria degli Angeli (1911–1915); Camerlengo of the College of Cardinals (1916–1919); Vice-Dean of the College of Cardinals (1929–1930)

Orders
- Ordination: 7 June 1879 by Guglielmo Sanfelice d'Acquavilla
- Consecration: 26 November 1899 by Mariano Rampolla del Tindaro
- Created cardinal: 27 November 1911 by Pope Pius X
- Rank: Cardinal-Priest (1911–1915); Cardinal-Bishop (1915–1948)

Personal details
- Born: Gennaro Granito Pignatelli di Belmonte; 10 April 1851 Largo Santa Maria degli Angeli, Naples, Kingdom of the Two Sicilies
- Died: 16 February 1948 (aged 96) Domus Sanctae Marthae, Vatican City
- Buried: Campo Verano
- Parents: Angelo Granito; Paolina Francesca Pignatelli e Aymerich
- Education: Roman College
- Motto: Rumpar non flectar
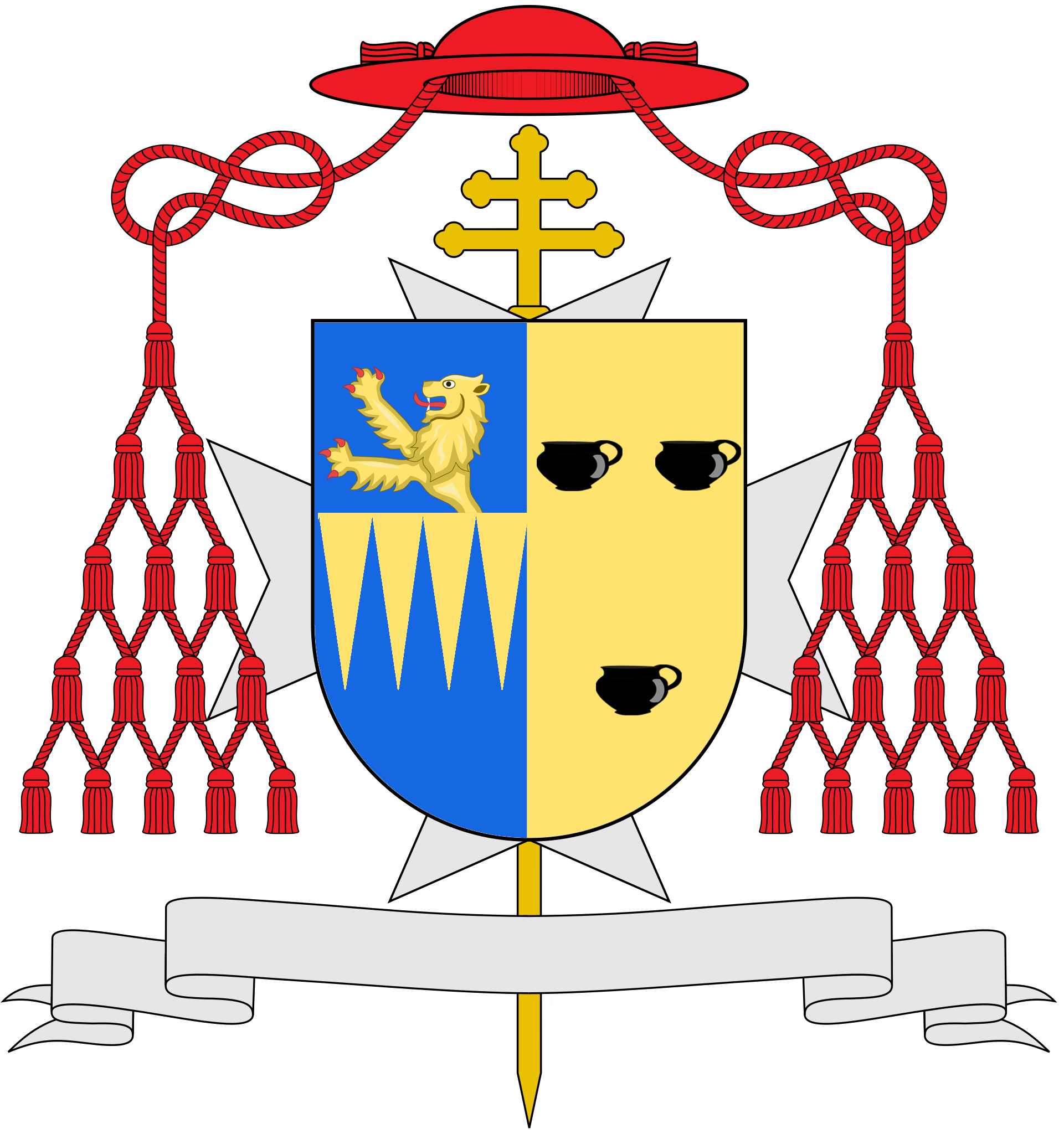
- Coat of arms

Styles of Gennaro Granito Pignatelli di Belmonte
- Reference style: His Eminence
- Spoken style: Your Eminence
- Informal style: Cardinal
- See: Albano (suburbicarian), Ostia (suburbicarian)

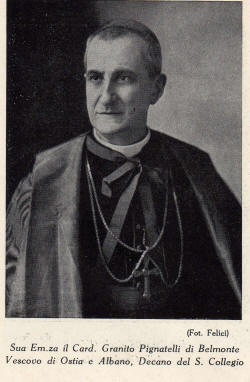
Granito Pignatelli di Belmonte

Gennaro Granito Pignatelli di Belmonte (10 April 1851 – 16 February 1948) was an Italian Cardinal of the Roman Catholic Church and a prominent member of the Roman Curia.

== Biography ==
Gennaro Granito Pignatelli di Belmonte was born in Naples. He was ordained a priest on 7 June 1879 in Naples. He worked in the archdiocese in various roles, amongst which as secretary to Archbishop Guglielmo Sanfelice D'Acquavella. He was appointed a domestic prelate to the Pope on 4 April 1884 and joined the Roman Curia in 1892, where he was attached to the Sacred Congregation for Extraordinary Ecclesiastical Affairs, concerned with foreign affairs of the Holy See. As attaché and counselor, he held posts in the Paris nunciature from 1893 to 1896.

In 1899, Granito Pignatelli di Belmonte was appointed Titular Archbishop of Edessa, consecrated by Mariano Rampolla, Cardinal Secretary of State, in Rome. Concurrently, he became nuncio to Belgium, later to Austria-Hungary (1904–1911). In 1909, the nuncio stood as godparent, representing Pope Pius X, to Don Carlos de Austria y de Borbón, son of Archduke Don Leopold Salvator of Habsburg-Lorraine and Infanta Doña Blanca de Borbón y de Borbón.

Pius X created him Cardinal-Priest in the Consistory of 27 November 1911, giving him the title of Santa Maria degli Angeli. In the same year he had been the papal envoy at the Coronation of George V. He was appointed a papal legate to the Eucharistic Congress of Lourdes on 12 July 1914. On 6 December 1915, he was promoted to Cardinal Bishop of Albano. From 4 December 1916 to 16 March 1919, he held the post of Camerlengo of the College of Cardinals. He was appointed a papal legate to the Eucharistic Congress of Palermo on 6 August 1924. On 15 February 1930, he was appointed vice-Dean of the College of Cardinals, becoming Dean on 9 July 1930, when he was appointed Cardinal Bishop of Ostia in 1930. On 14 July that year, the new Dean was also appointed Prefect of the Congregation of Ceremonies by Pope Pius XI.

He held both of these last posts until his death on 16 February 1948 in Rome. At 96 years of age, he was the oldest living cardinal and the last surviving cardinal of Pope Pius X. He participated in the conclaves of 1914, 1922 and 1939.

Granito Pignatelli di Belmonte was appointed Grand Prior of Rome of the Sovereign Military Order of Malta from December 1937. In 1911, he was granted the Grand Cross of the Order of Saint Stephen of Hungary by Emperor Franz Joseph I of Austria.

On his death, Granito Pignatelli di Belmonte was interred at Campo Verano, in Rome.

Catholic Church titles
| Preceded by Antonio Agliardi | Cardinal-Bishop of Albano; 6 December 1915 – 16 February 1948 | Succeeded by Giuseppe Pizzardo |
| Preceded by Vincenzo Vannutelli | Bishop of Ostia; 9 July 1930 – 16 February 1948 | Succeeded by Francesco Marchetti-Selvaggiani |
| Preceded by Vincenzo Vannutelli | Prefect of the Congregation of Ceremonies; 14 July – 16 February 1948 | Succeeded by Francesco Marchetti-Selvaggiani |
| Preceded by Vincenzo Vannutelli | Dean of the College of Cardinals; 9 July 1930 – 16 February 1948 | Succeeded by Francesco Marchetti-Selvaggiani |
