= Carmine Gori-Merosi =

Italian prelate of the Catholic Church

His Eminence Carmine Gori-Merosi
- Secretary of the Consistorial Congregation
- Church: Roman Catholic Church
- Appointed: 30 March 1882
- Term ended: 15 September 1886
- Predecessor: Pietro Lasagni
- Successor: Carlo Nocella
- Other posts: Cardinal-Deacon of Santa Maria ad Martyres (1884-86); Commendatory Abbot of Subiaco (1884-86)

Orders
- Ordination: 1832
- Created cardinal: 10 November 1884 by Pope Leo XIII
- Rank: Cardinal-Deacon

Personal details
- Born: Carmine Gori-Merosi; 15 February 1810 Subiaco, Papal States
- Died: 15 September 1886 (aged 76) Rome, Kingdom of Italy
- Parents: Giuseppe Gori; Maria Benedetta Merosi
- Occupation: Sub-Datary of the Apostolic Dataria (1869-81)
- Education: Pontifical Roman Athenaeum Saint Apollinare

Carmine Gori-Merosi (15 February 1810 – 15 September 1886) was an Italian prelate of the Catholic Church who worked in the Roman Curia, largely in non-public roles from 1847 until his death in 1886. He was made a cardinal in 1884.

== Biography ==
Carmine Gori-Merosi was born on 15 February 1810 in Subiaco, the son of a nobleman from Subiaco, Giuseppe Gori, who was related to the Giustiniani family on his mother's side and Maria Benedetta Merosi. He studied at the abbatial seminary of Subiaco and then the seminary of Rome. He was ordained a priest in 1832 and earned his doctorate at the University of Rome in 1835.

Pope Gregory XVI (r. 1831–1846) appointed him archpriest of the Basilica of Santa Maria ad Martyres and launched his career in the Roman Curia by naming him secretary of the Congregation of the Council. Pope Pius IX made him substitute of the Apostolic Dataria in 1847. He worked for the Apostolic Signatura in 1857 and 1867 and then returned to the Dataria as subdatary, its second highest office, from 1869 to 1881. He collaborated with Pope Pius on the papal bull Apostolicae Sedis moderationi, published on 12 October 1869, that defined church censures, their imposition, and relief. Pope Leo XIII appointed him secretary of the Congregation of the Consistory and of the College of Cardinals on 30 March 1882. He was also made a canon of St. Peter's Basilica in 1882.

Pope Leo raised him to the rank of cardinal deacon on 10 November 1884; he received his red galero and was assigned the deaconry of Santa Maria ad Martyres on 13 November.

He was appointed commendatory abbot of Subiaco on 24 November 1884.

He died in Rome on 15 September 1886 after a long illness.
