= Secretariate of Briefs to Princes and of Latin Letters =

The Secretariate of Briefs to Princes and of Latin Letters, or simply the Secretariate of Briefs, was one of the offices of the Roman Curia suppressed in 1967 during Pope Paul VI's reform of the Pontifical court. It was divided into two sections.

The Secretariate of Briefs to Princes consisted of the Secretary and two office assistants. The Secretary was a prelate responsible for writing the papal briefs addressed to emperors, kings, princes, and other dignitaries. He also prepared the allocutions that the Pope pronounced at consistories, as well as encyclicals and apostolic letters addressed to bishops and the faithful. He acted according to the instructions of the Pope. He was required to be a proficient Latinist because these documents were written in Latin.

The Secretary for Latin Letters was also a prelate or private papal chamberlain ("cameriere segreto" in Italian) and was responsible for writing letters in Latin of lesser importance on behalf of the Pope. He had an office assistant.

The Latin Secretaries also played a significant part in the proceedings surrounding the death and election of the Pope; one of the two Secretaries usually pronounced the funeral oration, in Latin, for the deceased Pope, while another held an oration after the mass Pro eligendo Pontifice ('For the election of the Pope') at the beginning of the conclave. The last Secretaries to perform this task were Del Ton and Tondini in 1963.

In 1967, the office was suppressed as an independent department by the apostolic constitution Regimini Ecclesiae universae; its tasks were transferred to a new Latin Letters Office, subordinate to the Secretariat of State.

== Partial list of incumbents ==
Secretaries of Briefs to Princes:

- Domenico Testa (Pius VII, Leo XII, Pius VIII, Gregory XVI)
- Gaspare Gasperini (Gregory XVI, Pius IX)
- Luca Pacifici (Pius IX)
- Francesco Mercurelli (Pius IX, Leo XIII)
- Carlo Nocella (Leo XIII)
- Alessandro Volpini (Leo XIII)
- Vincenzo Sardi (Pius X)
- Pietro Angelini (Pius X)
- Aurelio Galli (Pius X, Benedict XV)
- Nicola Sebastiani (Benedict XV)
- Antonio Bacci (Pius XI, Pius XII, John XXIII)
- Amleto Tondini (John XXIII, Paul VI)

Secretaries for Latin letters:

- Raffaele Mazio (Pius VII, Leo XII)
- Gaspare Gasperini (Leo XII, Pius VIII, Gregory XVI)
- Carlo Vizzardelli (Gregory XVI)
- Luca Pacifici (Gregory XVI, Pius IX)
- Giovanni Battista Palma (Pius IX)
- Domenico Fioramonti (Pius IX)
- Giovanni Sottovia (Pius IX)
- Francesco Mercurelli (Pius IX)
- Carlo Nocella (Pius IX, Leo XIII)
- Vincenzo Tarozzi (Leo XIII)
- Aurelio Galli (Pius X)
- Pacifico Massella (Benedict XV)
- Nicola Sebastiani (Benedict XV)
- Giuseppe Zaccarella (Pius XI)
- Angelo Perugini (Pius XI, Pius XII, John XXIII)
- Giuseppe Del Ton (John XXIII, Paul VI)

== See also ==
- Latin Letters Office
