= Giuseppe Ceppetelli =

Italian archbishop (1846–1917)

- Titular Patriarch of Constantinople
- Church: Roman Catholic Church
- In office: 1903–1917
- Predecessor: Carlo Nocella
- Successor: Michele Zezza di Zapponeta
- Previous posts: Bishop of Ripatransone (1882-1890); Auxiliary Bishop of Rome (1890-1899); Titular Bishop of Tiberias (1890-1899); Vicegerent of Rome (1899-1917); Titular Archbishop of Myra (1899-1903)

Orders
- Ordination: 16 April 1870
- Consecration: 2 April 1882 by Raffaele Monaco La Valletta

Personal details
- Born: Giuseppe Ceppetelli; 15 March 1846 Rome, Papal States
- Died: 12 March 1917 (aged 70) Rome, Kingdom of Italy

Styles of Giuseppe Ceppetelli
- Reference style: The Most Reverend
- Spoken style: Your Grace
- Religious style: Archbishop

Giuseppe Ceppetelli (15 March 1846 – 12 March 1917) was an Italian Catholic prelate who served as Titular Patriarch of Constantinople from 1903 until his death.

He was ordained on Holy Saturday of 1870 and was consecrated a bishop by the Vicar General of Rome, Raffaele Monaco La Valletta, in 1882. He ordained the 22-year-old Angelo Giuseppe Roncalli, the future Pope John XXIII, to the priesthood on 10 August 1904.

He died on the eve of his 71st birthday in 1917 and was buried in Rome.

== External links and additional sources ==
- Cheney, David M. "Tiberias (Titular See)". Catholic-Hierarchy.org. (for Chronology of Bishops) ^{[self-published]}
- Chow, Gabriel. "Titular Episcopal See of Tiberias (Italy)". GCatholic.org. (for Chronology of Bishops) ^{[self-published]}
