= Aurelio Galli =

His Eminence Aurelio Galli
- Cardinal-Deacon of Sant'Angelo in Pescheria
- Church: Roman Catholic Church
- Appointed: 23 December 1923
- Term ended: 26 March 1929
- Predecessor: Filippo Giustini
- Successor: Pietro Boetto
- Previous posts: Secretary to the Secretary of the Latin Letters (1899–1903); Secretary of Latin Letters (1903–1911); Secretary of Briefs to Princes (1911–1923)

Orders
- Ordination: 2 April 1889
- Created cardinal: 20 December 1923 by Pope Pius XI
- Rank: Cardinal-Deacon

Personal details
- Born: Aurelio Galli; 26 February 1866 Frascati, Papal States
- Died: 26 March 1929 (aged 63) Rome, Kingdom of Italy
- Buried: Campo Verano (1929–30); Frascati Cathedral
- Education: Pontifical Roman Seminary; Pontifical Gregorian University

Aurelio Galli (26 February 1866 – 26 March 1929) was an Italian cardinal.

== Biography ==
Aurelio Galli was born in Frascati and studied for the priesthood in Rome, where he was ordained on 2 April 1889. He served in the Roman Curia for many years, first in the staff of the Congregation for Extraordinary Ecclesiastical Affairs, and then, from 1899 onward, as a Latinist in the Secretariate of Briefs to Princes and of Latin Letters. In July 1903, he was assigned the task of composing and delivering the funeral oration for the deceased pope Leo XIII; a month later, he was promoted to the post of Secretary of Latin Letters. In 1911, he became Secretary of Briefs to Princes, the highest post among the Latinists of the Vatican. In the course of his duties, he addressed the conclaves of 1914 and 1922 with the customary oration Pro eligendo pontifice ('For the election of the Pope').

In the consistory of 20 December 1923, Galli was created cardinal by Pope Pius XI and received the deaconry of S. Angelo in Pescheria. He died suddenly, of an apoplectic stroke, on 26 March 1929.
