= Francesco Salesio Della Volpe =

Italian Catholic Cardinal (1844–1916)

His Eminence Francesco Salesio Della Volpe
- Prefect of the Congregation of the Index
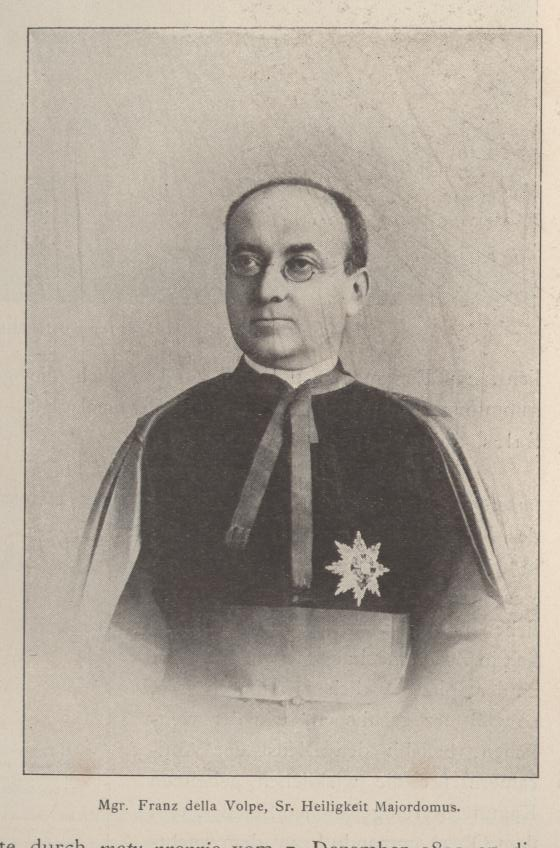
- Della Volpe as an archbishop in 1899
- Church: Roman Catholic Church
- Appointed: 26 January 1911
- Term ended: 5 November 1916
- Predecessor: Francesco Segna
- Successor: None - office suppressed
- Other posts: Cardinal-Deacon of Santa Maria in Aquiro (1901-16); Protodeacon (1911-16); Camerlengo of the Apostolic Camera (1914-16)
- Previous post: Archivist of the Vatican Secret Archives (1908-11)

Orders
- Ordination: 21 December 1867
- Created cardinal: 19 June 1899 (in pectore); 15 April 1901 (revealed) by Pope Leo XIII
- Rank: Cardinal-Deacon

Personal details
- Born: Francesco Salesio Della Volpe; 24 December 1844 Ravenna, Papal States
- Died: 5 November 1916 (aged 71) Rome, Kingdom of Italy
- Buried: Campo Verano
- Parents: Ignazio Della Volpe; Ortensia Mazzolani
- Education: Pontifical Roman Athenaeum Saint Apollinare; Pontifical Academy of Ecclesiastical Nobles
- Coat of arms

Francesco Salesio Della Volpe (24 December 1844 in Ravenna, Italy - 5 November 1916 in Rome, Italy) was an Italian Catholic Cardinal.

He held the position of secretary of the Congregation of Indulgences and Relics and prefect of the Prefecture of the Pontifical Household. Created cardinal in pectore in 1899, he was named published in consistory of 1901. He was prefect of the Vatican Archives from 1908 and prefect of the Congregation of the Index from January 1911. As protodeacon, he announced the election of cardinal Giacomo Della Chiesa to the papacy at the end of the conclave of 1914; he crowned the new pope on September 6, 1914.

Catholic Church titles
Preceded by Francesco Segna	Archivist of the Holy Roman Church; 26 October 1908 - 26 January 1911	Succeeded by Mariano Rampolla del Tindaro
Preceded by Francesco Segna	Cardinal Protodeacon; 1911–1916	Succeeded by Gaetano Bisleti
