= Francesco Segna =

His Eminence Francesco Segna
- Prefect of the Congregation of the Index
- Church: Roman Catholic Church
- Appointed: 13 January 1908
- Term ended: 4 January 1911
- Predecessor: Andreas Steinhuber
- Successor: Francesco Salesio Della Volpe
- Other posts: Cardinal-Deacon of Santa Maria in Portico (1894-1911); Protodeacon (1907-11)
- Previous posts: Undersecretary of the Congregation for Extraordinary Ecclesiastical Affairs (1881-88); Regent of the Apostolic Penitentiary (1888-91); Secretary of the Congregation for Extraordinary Ecclesiastical Affairs (1891-93); Assessor of the Commission of Roman and Universal Inquisition (1893-94); Archivist of the Vatican Secret Archives (1896-1908)

Orders
- Ordination: 20 December 1860
- Created cardinal: 18 May 1894 by Pope Leo XIII
- Rank: Cardinal-Deacon

Personal details
- Born: Francesco Segna; 31 August 1836 Poggio Cinolfo, Papal States
- Died: 4 January 1911 (aged 74) Rome, Kingdom of Italy
- Buried: Campo Verano
- Parents: Angelo Segna; Faustina Bencivenga
- Education: Roman Seminary; La Sapienza

Styles of Francesco Segna
- Reference style: His Eminence
- Spoken style: Your Eminence
- Informal style: Cardinal
- See: None

Francesco Segna S.T.D. (31 August 1836 - 4 January 1911) was a Cardinal of the Roman Catholic Church and Archivist of the Holy Roman Church.

Francesco Segna was born in Poggio Ginolfo, Italy. He was of a noble and rich family. He was educated at the Jesuit school, Tivoli and later at the Roman Seminary in Rome where he earned a doctorate in theology and at the La Sapienza University where he received a doctorate in law.

== Priesthood ==
He was ordained to the priesthood on 20 December 1860. He was appointed as professor of dogma at the Pontifical Roman Athenaeum of S. Apollinare in 1869. He served as a canonist of the Apostolic Penitentiary. While in Rome he was also undersecretary of the Congregation for Extraordinary Ecclesiastical Affairs from 1881. He was created Domestic prelate of His Holiness in 1884. He left Rome to become the Auditor of the nunciature in Spain in 1884 and was promoted to be the chargé d'affaires in 1887. After his service in Spain he returned to Rome to become an auditor of the Roman Rota in 1888. He returned to the Congregation for Extraordinary Ecclesiastical Affairs to become its secretary (in effect its chief official as the Pope held the title of Prefect) on 13 July 1891.

== Cardinalate ==
He was created and Cardinal-Deacon of Santa Maria in Portico by Pope Leo XIII in the consistory of 18 May 1894. He resigned his post at the Congregation for Extraordinary Ecclesiastical Affairs the same day and was appointed Archivist of the Holy Roman Church on 4 July 1896. He was a cardinal elector in the conclave of 1903 that elected Pope Pius X. He was Cardinal protodeacon (that is the longest serving Cardinal-Deacon). He was appointed as Prefect of the Congregation of the Index on 13 January 1908 holding the post until his death in 1911.

== Publications ==
- Francisci Card: Segna Libellus Retractationum
- De ecclesiae Christi; constitutione et regimine ...

Catholic Church titles
Preceded by Domenico Ferrata	Secretary of the Sacred Congregation for Extraordinary Ecclesiastical Affairs; 13 July 1891–18 May 1894	Succeeded by Pietro Gasparri
Preceded by Luigi Galimberti	Archivist of the Holy Roman Church; 4 July 1896–13 January 1903	Succeeded by Francesco Salesio Della Volpe
Preceded by Andreas Steinhuber, S.J.	Cardinal Protodeacon; 1907–1911	Succeeded by Francesco Salesio Della Volpe
