= Alessandro Sanminiatelli Zabarella =

Italian cardinal

His Eminence Alessandro Sanminiatelli Zabarella
- Camerlengo Emeritus of the College of Cardinals
- Church: Roman Catholic Church
- Appointed: 22 June 1903
- Term ended: 27 March 1905
- Predecessor: Francesco di Paola Cassetta
- Successor: François-Désiré Mathieu
- Other post: Cardinal-Priest of Santi Marcellino e Pietro (1901-10)
- Previous posts: Almoner of the Office of Papal Charities (1874-87); Titular Archbishop of Tianae (1874-99); Latin Patriarch of Constantinople (1899-1901)

Orders
- Ordination: 6 September 1863 by Cosimo Barnaba Corsi
- Consecration: 14 August 1874 by Pope Pius IX
- Created cardinal: 19 June 1899 (in pectore); 15 April 1901 (revealed) by Pope Leo XIII
- Rank: Cardinal-Priest

Personal details
- Born: Alessandro Sanminiatelli Zabarella; 3 August 1840 Radicondoli, Volterra, Grand Duchy of Tuscany
- Died: 24 November 1910 (aged 70) Monte Castello di Vibio, Perugia, Kingdom of Italy
- Buried: Campo Verano
- Parents: Ferdinando Sanminiatelli Zabarella; Leopolda Pescatori di Peccioli
- Education: Almo Collegio Capranica; Roman Seminary; La Sapienza University; Pontifical Academy of Ecclesiastical Nobles

Styles of Alessandro Sanminiatelli Zabarella
- Reference style: His Eminence
- Spoken style: Your Eminence
- Informal style: Cardinal
- See: Constantinople

Alessandro Sanminiatelli Zabarella (3 August 1840 – 24 November 1910) was an Italian cardinal of the Catholic Church. He served as Latin Patriarch of Constantinople from 1889 until 1901.

== Biography ==
Sanminiatelli Zabarella was born in Radicondoli to Count Ferdinando Sanminiatelli Zabarella and his wife Leopolda Pescatori di Peccioli. He studied at the Archiepiscopal College-Seminary of Pisa, and entered the Almo Collegio Capranica in Rome, in 1857. From the Pontifical Roman Seminary, he obtained his doctorates in philosophy (1860) and in theology (1864).

Zabarella was ordained to the priesthood by Cardinal Cosimo Corsi on 6 September 1863, and attended La Sapienza University, earning his doctorate in canon law in 1866. From 1861 to 1868, he studied at the Pontifical Academy of Ecclesiastical Nobles, also in Rome. He was raised to the rank of Privy Chamberlain supernumerary in 1867, and Privy chamberlain participantium in 1868. He later became a canon of St. Peter's Basilica.

On 31 July 1874, Zabarella was appointed Grand Almoner and Titular Archbishop of Tyana. He received his episcopal consecration on 14 August from Pope Pius IX. He was named President of the Holy See's Judicial Commission on 23 August 1887 and Auditor-General of the Apostolic Chamber on 29 November 1887.

Pope Leo secretly (in pectore) made him a member of the College of Cardinals in the consistory of 19 June 1899, three days before his appointment as Latin Patriarch of Constantinople on 22 June. Zabarella was published as Cardinal-Priest of Santi Marcellino e Pietro on 15 April 1901. He served as Camerlengo of the Sacred College of Cardinals from 22 June 1903 to 27 March 1905 and participated in the papal conclave of 1903, which elected Pope Pius X.

Zabarella died in Monte Castello, at the age of 70. He is buried in the Campo Verano cemetery.

Catholic Church titles
Preceded by Giovanni Casali del Drago	Latin Patriarch of Constantinople; 1899–1901	Succeeded by Carlo Nocella
Preceded by Francesco di Paola Cassetta	Camerlengo of the Sacred College of Cardinals; 1903–1905	Succeeded by François-Désiré Mathieu
