= Francesco di Paola Cassetta =

Italian cardinal

His Eminence Francesco di Paola Cassetta
- Prefect of the Congregation of the Council
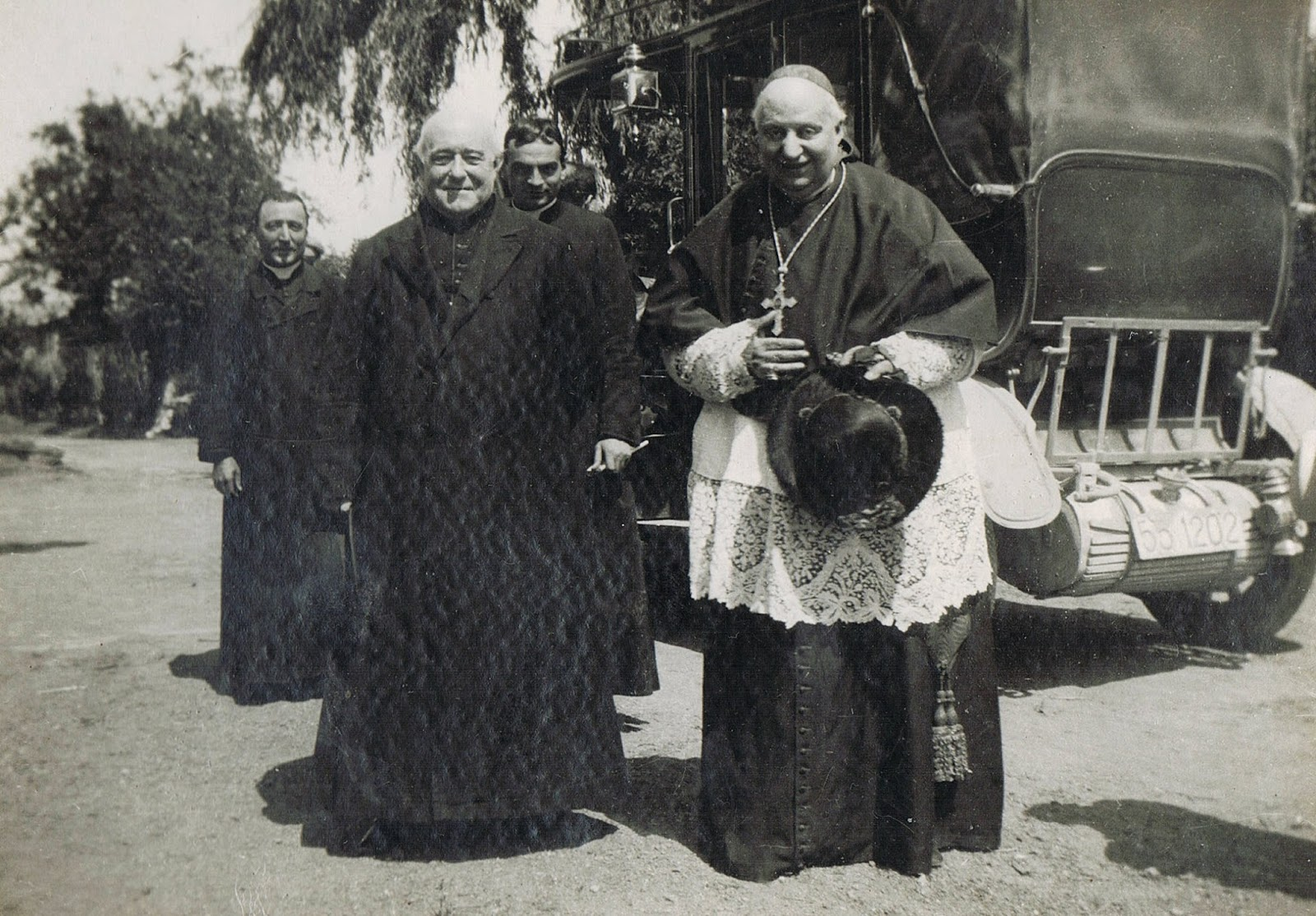
- Francesco di Paola Cassetta (right)
- Church: Roman Catholic Church
- Appointed: 10 February 1914
- Term ended: 23 March 1919
- Predecessor: Casimiro Gennari
- Successor: Donato Sbarretti
- Other posts: Cardinal-Bishop of Frascati (1911-19); Librarian of the Vatican Apostolic Library (1914-19)
- Previous posts: Titular Bishop of Amathus in Palaestina (1884-87); Titular Archbishop of Nicomedia (1887-95); Latin Patriarch of Antioch (1895-99); Cardinal-Priest of San Crisogono (1899-1905); Cardinal-Deacon of Santi Vito, Modesto e Crescenzia in commendam (1901-05); Camerlengo of the College of Cardinals (1902-03); Cardinal-Bishop of Sabina (1905-11); Archivist of the Vatican Secret Archives (1914-17)

Orders
- Ordination: 10 June 1865
- Consecration: 21 December 1884 by Lucido Maria Parocchi
- Created cardinal: 19 June 1899 by Pope Leo XIII
- Rank: Cardinal-Priest (1899-1905); Cardinal-Bishop (1905-19)

Personal details
- Born: Francesco di Paola Cassetta; 12 August 1841 Rome, Papal States
- Died: 23 March 1919 (aged 77) Rome, Kingdom of Italy
- Buried: Campo Verano
- Parents: Pietro Cassetta; Clementina Sturbinetti

Styles of Francesco di Paola Cassetta
- Reference style: His Eminence
- Spoken style: Your Eminence
- Informal style: Cardinal
- See: Frascati (suburbicarian)

Francesco di Paola Cassetta (12 August 1841 – 23 March 1919) was an Italian Cardinal of the Catholic Church who served as Prefect of the Sacred Congregation of the Council from 1914 until his death, and was elevated to the cardinalate in 1899.

== Biography ==
Cassetta was born in Rome, and received the Sacrament of Confirmation on 1 September 1848. He studied at the Pontifical Roman Seminary, where he obtained his doctorates in theology (10 September 1863) and in canon and civil law (24 August 1866). Cassetta was ordained to the priesthood on 10 June 1865, and later raised to the rank of Domestic Prelate of His Holiness.

He was made referendary prelate of the Apostolic Signatura on 23 June 1878, auditor of the Vicar General of Rome on 3 April 1884, and later counselor of the Sacred Congregation for the Propagation of the Faith and of the Supreme Sacred Congregation of the Holy Office. He became a canon of the chapter of the Liberian Basilica on 23 November 1884.

On 2 December 1884, Cassetta was appointed Titular Bishop of Amathus in Palaestina by Pope Leo XIII. He received his episcopal consecration on the following 21 December, from Cardinal Lucido Parocchi, with Archbishop Pierre Dufal, CSC, and Bishop Guillaume-Marie Sourrieu serving as co-consecrators, in the church of San Luigi dei Francesi. Cassetta was later named Privy Almoner of His Holiness on 20 September 1887, and Titular Archbishop of Nicomedia on 25 November 1887. After becoming a canon of the chapter of St. Peter's Basilica on 17 July 1889, he served as Vice-Gerent of Rome from 12 November 1895 to 19 June 1899. On 29 November 1895, Cassetta was appointed Titular Patriarch of Antioch.

Pope Leo created him Cardinal-Priest of San Crisogono in the consistory of 19 June 1899. He was given the titular church of Ss. Vito, Modesto e Crescenzia in commendam on 28 April 1901. Cardinal Cassetta served as Camerlengo of the Sacred College of Cardinals from 9 June 1902 to 22 June 1903, and he was one of the cardinal electors in the 1903 papal conclave, which selected Pope Pius X. He opted to become Cardinal Bishop of Sabina and perpetual abbot of Farfa on 27 March 1905, and was made Prefect of the Sacred Congregation of Studies on 3 June 1911. On the following 27 November, he was transferred to the suburbicarian see of Frascati. Pope Pius X appointed him Archivist of the Holy Roman Church on 3 January 1914. He held these ploasts until his resignation in 1917. Before participating in the conclave of 1914, Cassetta was named Prefect of the Sacred Congregation of the Council on 10 February of that same year. He then served as Apostolic Visitor to the Hospice of the Catechumens, and Commissioner for the apostolic visitation of the Italian dioceses.

Cardinal Cassetta died in Rome, at the age of 77. He is buried in the chapel of Pontifical Urbanian Athenaeum in the Campo Verano cemetery. He was popularly known and liked for having devoted the majority of his private wealth to charitable works in Rome. He was a close friend of the Pacelli family, including Eugenio Pacelli, who would go on to become Pope Pius XII after Cardinal Cassetta's death.

Catholic Church titles
Preceded by Vencentius Tizzani	Titular Latin Patriarch of Antioch; 1895–1899	Succeeded by Carlo Nocella
Preceded by Giovanni Battista Casali del Drago	Camerlengo of the Sacred College of Cardinals; 1902–1903	Succeeded by Alessandro Sanminiatelli Zabarella
Preceded by Beniamino Cavicchioni	Prefect of the Sacred Congregation of Studies; 1911–1914	Succeeded by Benedetto Lorenzelli
Preceded by Mariano Rampolla	Archivist and Librarian of the Holy Roman Church; 14 February 1914–1917	Succeeded by Francis Aidan Gasquet
Preceded by Casimiro Gennari	Prefect of the Sacred Congregation of the Council; 1914–1919	Succeeded by Donato Sbarretti Tazza
