= Congregation of Ceremonies =

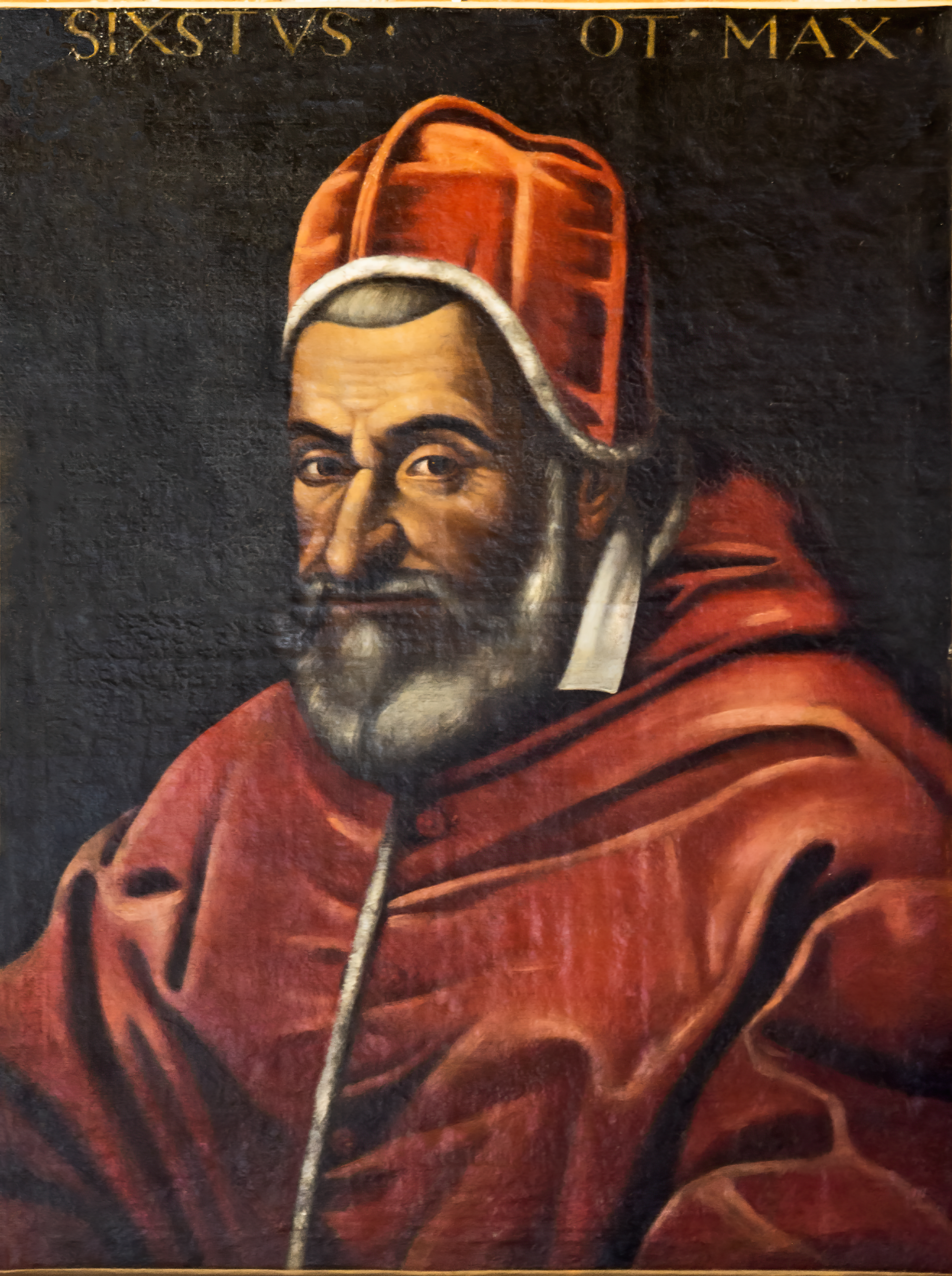
Pope Sixtus V, founder of the Congregation of Ceremonies

The Sacred Congregation of Ceremonies was a dicastery of the Roman Curia that was charged with the direction of all papal ceremonies as well as of the ceremonial of cardinals.

== History and functions ==
The congregation was established by Pope Sixtus V. It also communicated instructions to the legates of the Holy See for the maintenance of due decorum in transacting the affairs of their missions. This congregation also instructed the members of the Noble Guard and the ablegate who were sent to convey to new cardinals, living in Catholic states outside of Rome, the news of their promotion, together with the cardinal's hat and the red biretta. It instructed newly promoted cardinals, too, on the etiquette to be followed conformably with their new dignity. Finally, it solved the questions of precedence which arose among cardinals or among ambassadors to the Holy See.

It was dissolved in 1967 in the Curial reforms by Pope Paul VI.

== Prefects since 1884 ==
- Carlo Sacconi (28 Mar 1884 – 25 Feb 1889)
- Raffaele Monaco La Valletta (1 Mar 1889 – 14 Jul 1896)
- Serafino Vannutelli (14 Mar 1889 – 19 Aug 1915)
- Luigi Oreglia di Santo Stefano (1897 – 7 Dec 1913)
- Vincenzo Vannutelli (15 Dec 1914 – 9 Jul 1930)
- Gennaro Granito Pignatelli di Belmonte (14 Jul 1930 – 16 Feb 1948)
- Francesco Marchetti-Selvaggiani (5 Feb 1948 – 13 Jan 1951)
- Eugène-Gabriel-Gervais-Laurent Tisserant (10 Mar 1951 – 1967)

== Bibliography ==
- Günther Wassilowsky, Hubert Wolf: Päpstliches Zeremoniell in der Frühen Neuzeit – Das Diarium des Zeremonienmeisters Paolo Alaleone de Branca während des Pontifikats Gregors XV. (1621–1623). Rhema-Verlag, Münster 2007, ISBN 978-3-930454-80-8 (with the complete original Latin text of the diarium)
