= Alessandro Franchi (cardinal) =

Italian cardinal and archbishop

- Cardinal Secretary of State
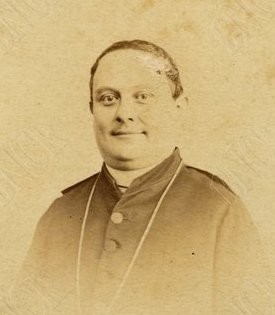
- The then-archbishop Franchi in 1865.
- Church: Roman Catholic Church
- Appointed: 5 March 1878
- Term ended: 31 July 1878
- Predecessor: Giovanni Simeoni
- Successor: Lorenzo Nina
- Other posts: Cardinal-Priest of Santa Maria in Trastevere (1874-78); Prefect of the Apostolic Palaces (1878)
- Previous posts: Titular Archbishop of Thessalonica (1856-73); Apostolic Nuncio to Florence (1856-59); Secretary of the Congregation for Extraordinary Ecclesiastical Affairs (1860-68); Apostolic Nuncio to Spain (1868-69); Prefect of the Congregation of the Propagation of the Faith (1874-78)

Orders
- Ordination: 16 March 1842
- Consecration: 6 July 1856 by Pope Pius IX
- Created cardinal: 22 December 1873 by Pope Pius IX
- Rank: Cardinal-Priest

Personal details
- Born: Alessandro Franchi; 25 June 1819 Rome, Papal States
- Died: 31 July 1878 (aged 59) Apostolic Palace, Rome, Kingdom of Italy
- Buried: Campo Verano
- Education: Pontifical Roman Seminary; Sapienza University of Rome

Alessandro Franchi (25 June 1819 – 31 July 1878) was an Italian cardinal and archbishop.

== Biography ==
His father was a notary. He studied at the Pontifical Roman Seminary, where he received his Doctor of Theology degree in 1841, followed by a degree in utroque iure from the Sapienza University of Rome. In 1842, he was ordained a priest and taken under the sponsorship of Luigi Lambruschini, the Cardinal Secretary of State.

In 1848, during the First Italian War of Independence, he was selected to become part of a sensitive diplomatic mission to Emperor Ferdinand I; an unsuccessful attempt to convince the Emperor that he should give up the Habsburg-held territories in Italy. Five years later, he served briefly as chargé d'affaires in Madrid. In 1856, he became the Titular Bishop of Thessalonica. Later that same year, he was ordained a bishop by Pope Pius IX.

He was also appointed Apostolic Nuncio for the city of Florence, which was then the capital of the Grand Duchy of Tuscany. In that capacity, he opposed the unification efforts of Count Camillo Cavour. After the expulsion of Grand Duke Ferdinand IV, the Grand Duchy became part of the Kingdom of Sardinia, so Franchi returned to Rome and was appointed Secretary of Church Affairs.

In 1868, he returned to Madrid, this time as Apostolic Nuncio, but was there for less than a year when he was expelled following the Glorious Revolution. After that, he was involved in preparing for the First Vatican Council. When the proclamation of Papal Infallibility caused a schism in the Armenian Catholic Church, he was sent to Istanbul to convince Sultan Abdülaziz that the Vatican's position was correct and ensure that Patriarch Anthony Petros IX Hassun would also be recognized as infallible. Thanks to the assistance of Mehmed Emin Âli Pasha, the Grand Vizier, he was able to achieve that goal, but the Vizier's death prevented the agreement from being formally applied.

He was created a Cardinal on 22 December 1873 and, the following month, received the title of "Santa Maria in Trastevere". In 1875, he was appointed Prefect of "Propaganda Fide" (now known as the Congregation for the Evangelization of Peoples).

At the Papal conclave held after the death of Pius IX, he was a supporter of Cardinal Pecci, who was elected and took the name of Leo XIII. Franchi was then appointed Cardinal Secretary of State and followed a moderate course. He had already made some diplomatic approaches to Bavaria and Prussia when he died suddenly, from malaria (although some suspected poisoning).

Catholic Church titles
Preceded by Giovanni Simeoni	Cardinal Secretary of State; 5 March – 31 July 1878	Succeeded by Lorenzo Nina
