= Vincenzo Vannutelli =

Italian prelate (1836–1930)

His Eminence Vincenzo Vannutelli
- Dean of the College of Cardinals
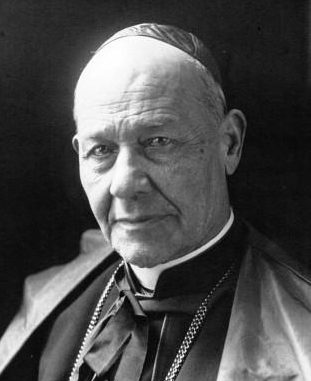
- The cardinal pictured in 1913.
- Church: Catholic Church
- Appointed: 6 December 1915
- Term ended: 9 July 1930
- Predecessor: Serafino Vannutelli
- Successor: Gennaro Granito Pignatelli di Belmonte
- Other posts: Archpriest of the Basilica of Santa Maria Maggiore (1896–1930); Cardinal-Bishop of Palestrina (1900–30); Datary of the Apostolic Dataria (1914–30); Cardinal-Bishop of Ostia (1915–30); Prefect of the Congregation of Ceremonies (1915–30)
- Previous posts: Vicar Apostolic of Constantinople (1880–82); Titular Archbishop of Sardes (1880–90); Apostolic Internuncio to Brazil (1882–83); Apostolic Nuncio to Portugal (1883–91); Cardinal-Priest of San Silvestro in Capite (1891–1900); Prefect of the Congregation of the Council (1902–08); Prefect of the Apostolic Signatura (1908–14)

Orders
- Ordination: 23 December 1860
- Consecration: 2 February 1880 by Giovanni Simeoni
- Created cardinal: 30 December 1889 (in pectore); 23 June 1890 (revealed) by Pope Leo XIII
- Rank: Cardinal-Priest (1891–1900); Cardinal-Bishop (1900–30)

Personal details
- Born: Vincenzo Vannutelli; 5 December 1836 Genazzano, Palestrina, Papal States
- Died: 9 July 1930 (aged 93) Rome, Kingdom of Italy
- Coat of arms

Styles of Vincenzo Vannutelli
- Reference style: His Eminence
- Spoken style: Your Eminence
- Informal style: Cardinal

Vincenzo Vannutelli (5 December 1836 – 9 July 1930) was an Italian prelate of the Catholic Church. He spent his career in the foreign service of the Holy See and was made a cardinal in 1890.

At his death he was the oldest member of the College of Cardinals, the last surviving cardinal elevated to that rank during the 19th century, and the next to last surviving cardinal named by Pope Leo XIII. (Note: The last surviving cardinal appointed by Leo XIII was Lev Skrbensky z Hriste.)

His older brother Serafino (1834–1915) was also a cardinal.

== Biography ==
Vincenzo Vannutelli was born in Genazzano, Diocese of Palestrina, Lazio. He studied at the Collegium Capranica and the Pontifical Gregorian University. He was ordained a priest on 23 December 1860 and spent several years as a seminary faculty member.

Most of his early career was in Roman and at foreign postings of the Secretariat of State, aside from two years starting in 1878 when he was an Auditor of the Roman Rota.

On 23 January 1880 he was named Titular Archbishop of Sardes and Apostolic Delegate to the Ottoman Empire. He was consecrated a bishop on 2 February 1880 by Cardinal Giovanni Simeoni.

In December 1889 Pope Leo XIII named him a cardinal in pectore, i.e., secretly. His appointment was publicly announced at a consistory in 1890, where he was named Cardinal-Priest of San Silvestro in Capite. His elevation to the rank of cardinal was an exception to a rule established in 1586 that barred the pope from naming a cardinal's brother a cardinal. Vincenzo's brother Serafino (1834–1915) had been made a cardinal in 1887 and was still living. (Note: Pope Leo XIII appointed his own older brother Giuseppe Pecci a cardinal in 1879, but that was not a case of appointing the brother of a current cardinal.)

Vannutelli became prefect of the economy of the Sacred Congregation for the Propagation of the Faith in 1892 and held that position for ten years. On 16 December 1896 he was named Archpriest of the Basilica di Santa Maria Maggiore.

He became Cardinal-Bishop of Palestrina in 1900. With Cardinal Pietro Gasparri he was one of the principals responsible for the codification of canon law begun by Pope Pius X in 1904 and completed thirteen years later. Vannutelli also served as prefect of the Commission for the Revision of the Provincial Councils from 1902 until 1908, which was charged with interpreting the documents of past councils according to recent papal rulings.

He participated in three conclaves, that of 1903 which elected Pope Pius X, that of 1914 which elected Pope Benedict XV, and that of 1922 which elected Pope Pius XI.

In 1906, he reported receiving a blackmail letter threatening to publish compromising letters he was said to have written if the sender was not paid 1,000 lire. He notified the police, and a man was arrested.

He succeeded his brother Serafino as Dean of the College of Cardinals in 1915. From this position, in 1923 he said of Mussolini that «for his energy and devotion to the country he was chosen to save the nation and restore her fortune»; these words caused a stir in Italy, and were interpreted inside and outside the country as a Vatican approval of the Fascist Regime.

He died in Rome on 9 July 1930.

== Honours ==
- 1878: Grand Cordon in the Order of Leopold

== Notes ==
Catholic Church titles
Preceded by Gustav von Hohenlohe-Schillingsfürst	Archpriest of the Basilica of Santa Maria Maggiore; 16 December 1896 – 9 July 1930	Succeeded by Bonaventura Cerretti
Preceded by Angelo Di Pietro	Prefect of the Congregation of the Council; 30 July 1902 – 15 December 1914	Succeeded by Casimiro Gennari
Preceded by Serafino Vannutelli	Dean of the Sacred College of Cardinals; 6 December 1915 – 9 July 1930	Succeeded by Gennaro Granito di Belmonte
Preceded by Isidoro Verga	Prefect of the Supreme Tribunal of the Apostolic Signatura; 20 October 1908 – 9 July 1930	Succeeded by Michele Lega
