= Giovanni Simeoni =

Italian prelate of the Catholic Church (1816–1892)

- Prefect of the Congregation for Propagation of the Faith
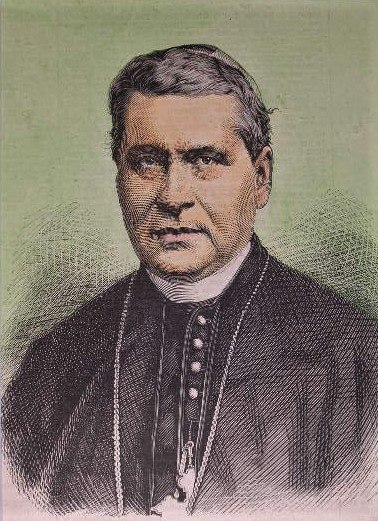
- Cardinal Simeoni in 1878
- Church: Catholic
- Archdiocese: Chalcedon (titular)
- In office: 1878–1892
- Other posts: Titular Archbishop of Chalcedon (1875–1892); Apostolic Nuncio to Spain (1875–1876); Cardinal Secretary of State (1876–1878); Camerlengo of the Sacred College of Cardinals (1885–1886)

Orders
- Ordination: 1839
- Consecration: April 4, 1875 by Alessandro Franchi
- Created cardinal: March 15, 1875 (in pectore); September 17, 1875 (elevated) by Pope Pius IX
- Rank: Cardinal-Priest of San Pietro in Vincoli

Personal details
- Born: July 12, 1816 Paliano, Italy
- Died: January 14, 1892 (aged 75) Rome
- Buried: Pontifical Urban Athenaeum Chapel, Campo Verano

Giovanni Simeoni (July 12, 1816 – January 14, 1892) was an Italian prelate of the Catholic Church who was appointed a cardinal in 1875 and served as Prefect of the Sacred Congregation for Propagation of the Faith from 1878 until his death in 1892.

== Biography ==
Giovanni Simeoni was born in Paliano; his father was a majordomo of the Colonna family. He attended the seminary in Palestrina before going to Rome to study at the Collegio Romano and La Sapienza University, where he studied theology and canon law. The Colonna family subsidized his studies.

Simeoni was ordained to the priesthood in 1839. He then served as preceptor of the children of Prince Colonna, and as professor of philosophy and theology at the Pontifical Urban Athenaeum of Propaganda Fide. After being raised to the rank of Privy Chamberlain of His Holiness, he was made auditor of the nunciature to Spain and Domestic Prelate of His Holiness (1857). Simeoni later became adiutor ab actis of the Sacred Congregation for the Propagation of the Faith, and served as the Congregation's secretary from 1868 to 1875.

On March 5, 1875, Simeoni was appointed Nuncio to Spain and Titular Archbishop of Chalcedon by Pope Pius IX. Pope Pius also secretly (in pectore) elevated him to the College of Cardinals in the consistory of March 15 of that same year. Simeoni received his episcopal consecration on the following April 4 from Cardinal Alessandro Franchi, with Archbishops Edward Henry Howard and Pietro Villanova Castellacci serving as co-consecrators, in the chapel of the Pontifical Urban Athenaeum of Propaganda Fide.

Simeoni was published as Cardinal-Priest of San Pietro in Vincoli in the consistory of September 17, 1875. Between December 18, 1876 and the death of Pope Pius IX on February 7, 1878, he also served as Vatican Secretary of State, Prefect of the Sacred Congregation of Public Ecclesiastical Affairs, Prefect of the Apostolic Palace, and Administrator of the Patrimony of the Holy See; Pius IX had designated him as executor of his will as well.

The Cardinal then participated in the conclave of 1878, which resulted in the election of Pope Leo XIII, who confirmed him as Prefect of the Apostolic Palace and Administrator of the Patrimony of the Holy See. From 1878 until his death, he served as Protector of the Pontifical North American College in Rome. Simeoni was named Prefect of the Sacred Congregation for the Propagation of the Faith, also known as the "Red Pope", on March 5, 1878, and president of the missionary seminaries of Rome on January 1, 1885. From March 27, 1885 to January 15, 1886, he served as Camerlengo of the Sacred College of Cardinals.

During his tenure as the head of the Catholic Church's global missionary network, Cardinal Simeoni became very important to the history of African-American Roman Catholicism. In November 1883, Cardinal Simeoni summoned all the Bishops of the Catholic Church in the United States to Rome. During the meeting, the Cardinal shared a list of twelve concerns he wished the American Bishops to address. In particular, Simeoni, "noted that little had been done for emancipated slaves since the last Council. [He] also proposed a special collection in parishes that would benefit missions to Blacks in America."

This is also why newly ordained African-American priest Fr. Augustus Tolton was reassigned in 1886 from his original plans to be a missionary in Africa to instead travel from the Pontifical Urban University in Rome to instead serve as a Catholic missionary to the Black community in the United States. Cardinal Simeoni famously quipped, while issuing the orders in a document that still survives in the Vatican archives, "America has been called the most enlightened nation. We will see if it deserves the honor. If America has never seen a Negro priest, it will see one now."

Cardinal Simeoni died in Rome, at the age of 75. After lying in state in the church of the Pontifical Urban Athenaeum of Propaganda Fide, he was buried in the chapel of the same athenaeum in the Campo Verano cemetery. Simeoni also left his notable art collection to the Pope in his will.

== Episcopal lineage ==
Simeoni's episcopal lineage, or apostolic succession was:

- Cardinal Scipione Rebiba
- Cardinal Giulio Antonio Santorio
- Cardinal Girolamo Bernerio
- Archbishop Galeazzo Sanvitale
- Cardinal Ludovico Ludovisi
- Cardinal Luigi Caetani
- Cardinal Ulderico Carpegna
- Cardinal Paluzzo Paluzzi Altieri degli Albertoni
- Pope Benedict XIII
- Pope Benedict XIV
- Cardinal Enrico Enríquez
- Archbishop Manuel Quintano Bonifaz
- Cardinal Buenaventura Fernández de Córdoba Spínola
- Cardinal Giuseppe Doria Pamphili
- Pope Pius VIII
- Pope Pius IX
- Cardinal Alessandro Franchi
- Cardinal Giovanni Simeoni

Catholic Church titles
Preceded by Alessandro Franchi	Apostolic Nuncio to Spain; 15 March 1875 – 18 December 1876	Succeeded by Giacomo Cattani
Preceded by Giacomo Antonelli	Cardinal Secretary of State; 18 December 1876 – 5 March 1878	Succeeded by Alessandro Franchi
Preceded by Alessandro Franchi	Prefect of the Sacred Congregation for Propagation of the Faith; 5 March 1878 – 14 January 1892	Succeeded by Mieczysław Halka Ledóchowski
Preceded by Mieczysław Halka Ledóchowski	Camerlengo of the Sacred College of Cardinals; 27 March 1885 – 15 January 1886	Succeeded by Domenico Bartolini
