= Mariano Rampolla =

Italian cardinal (1843–1913)

His Eminence Mariano Rampolla del Tindaro
- Official of the Congregation of the Holy Office
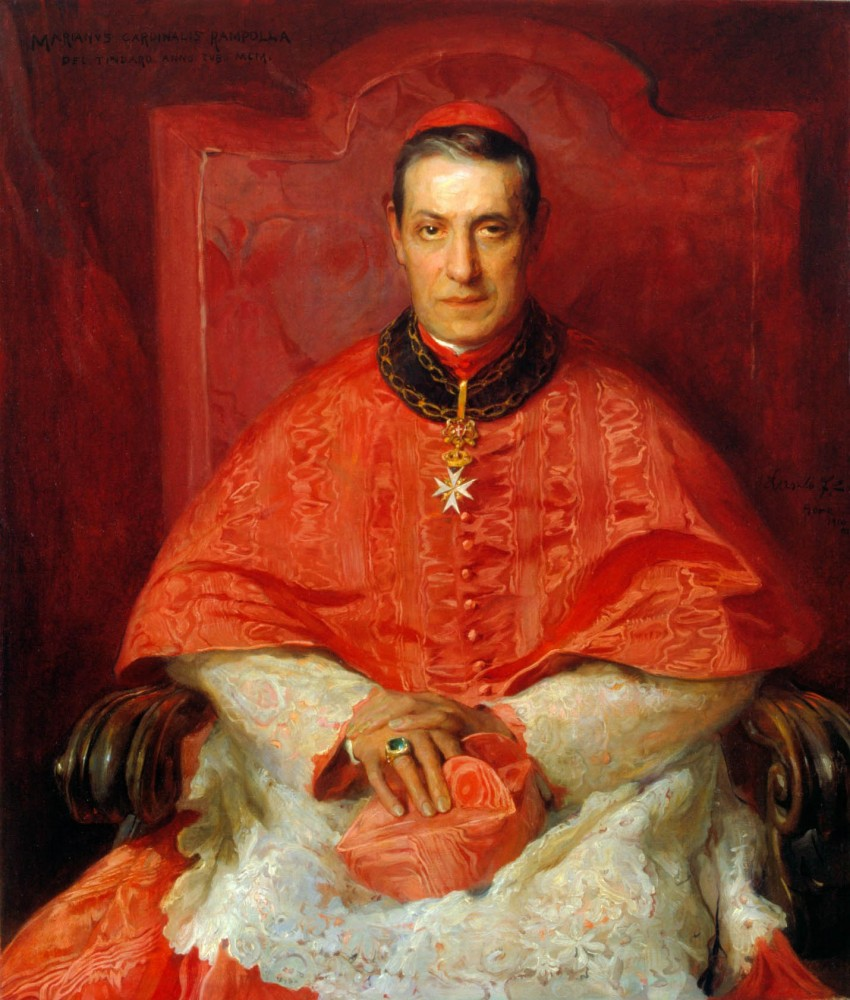
- Portrait by Philip de László, c. 1900
- Appointed: 30 December 1908
- Term ended: 23 February 1910
- Predecessor: Giuseppe Pizzardo
- Successor: Donato Raffaele Sbarretti Tazza
- Other posts: Cardinal-Priest of Santa Cecilia in Trastevere; Archpriest of the Basilica di San Pietro in Vaticano; Archivist of the Vatican Secret Archives
- Previous posts: President of the Pontifical Biblical Commission (1902–1908); Secretary of the Secretariat of State (1887–1908); Apostolic Nuncio to Spain (1882–1887); Titular Archbishop of Heraclea in Europa (1882–1887)

Orders
- Ordination: 1866
- Consecration: 8 December 1882 by Edward Henry Howard
- Created cardinal: 14 March 1887 by Pope Leo XIII
- Rank: Cardinal-Priest

Personal details
- Born: Mariano Rampolla del Tindaro; 17 August 1843 Polizzi Generosa, Kingdom of the Two Sicilies
- Died: 16 December 1913 (aged 70) Rome, Kingdom of Italy
- Denomination: Latin Catholic
- Coat of arms

Mariano Rampolla del Tindaro (17 August 1843 – 16 December 1913) was an Italian Cardinal in the Catholic Church, and the last man to have his candidacy for papal election vetoed through jus exclusivae by a Catholic monarch.

Rampolla featured in the episcopal lineage of Pope Francis.

== Early life ==
Born in Polizzi Generosa, Sicily, Rampolla was the son of Ignazio Rampolla, Count of Tindaro, and of his wife, Orsola Errante. (Note: He is often referred to with the title of marquess, but this appears to be inaccurate.)

Rampolla entered the Vatican Seminary in 1856, and in 1861 continued his education at the Collegio Capranica and the Pontifical Gregorian University. Having displayed a considerable knowledge in Oriental affairs, he was sent to the Pontifical Academy of Ecclesiastical Nobles as preparation for service in the Roman Curia.

In 1866, Rampolla was ordained a priest. He obtained a doctorate in utroque iure (Canon Law and Civil Law) in 1870 and in 1874, he was named a Canon of the Basilica di Santa Maria Maggiore. In 1875, he was sent to Madrid as Auditor of the Apostolic Nunciature to Spain. Appointed Secretary for Oriental Affairs of the Congregation for the Propagation of the Faith in 1877, the following year he was made a Protonotary apostolic de numero participantium, the highest rank of monsignor. In 1880, came the appointment as Secretary of the Congregation for the Propagation of the Faith, the office of the Holy See which dealt with areas of the world in which there was no regularly constituted hierarchy of bishops. Then, Rampolla was in addition appointed Secretary of the Congregation of Extraordinary Ecclesiastical Affairs, the subsection of the Secretariat of State that dealt with the foreign affairs of the Holy See.

On 1 December 1882, Rampolla was promoted to become titular archbishop of Heraclea in Europa, and on 8 December 1882 was consecrated to the episcopate by Cardinal Edward Henry Howard. This was in preparation for his appointment as Apostolic Nuncio to Spain, which came later the same month on 19 December.

== Cardinal ==
Styles of Mariano Rampolla del Tindaro
- Reference style: His Eminence
- Spoken style: Your Eminence
- Informal style: Cardinal
- See: Heraclea in Europa (titular)

In the consistory of 14 March 1887, Pope Leo XIII created Rampolla del Tindaro a Cardinal-Priest, and on 26 May assigned him the titular church of Santa Cecilia in Trastevere. On 2 June he was appointed Secretary of State. In this office, as he had previously in Spain, Rampolla employed Giacomo della Chiesa, the future Benedict XV, as his secretary.

On 21 March 1894, Pope Leo XIII named Cardinal Rampolla Archpriest of Saint Peter's Basilica.

As Secretary of State, Cardinal Rampolla supported the Austrian Christian Social Party, led by Karl Lueger, sometime mayor of Vienna (1897–1910). Lueger entered office in the face of the disapproval of Emperor Franz Joseph thanks to the personal intervention of Leo XIII. Lueger's Christian Social Party was the first Catholic social movement that was both anti-liberal and anti-Semitic. Rampolla began to swing papal policy from support of Austria-Hungary toward support of France, Austria's enemy. In Italy, he opposed every government that came to office, on the grounds that there was nothing to lose, and perhaps something to gain, especially on the international scene. He fought for the restoration of the pope's sovereignty over the former Papal States and fought new penal codes that aimed to criminalize clerical activity. Rampolla expressed his opinion that the French people were obligated to support Prime Minister Jules Méline at the height of the Dreyfus Affair.

=== 1903 Conclave ===
When Leo XIII died in 1903, it was widely expected that Rampolla would be elected pope. His candidacy gained momentum until the last moment when the Austrian Emperor Francis Joseph I imposed the jus exclusivae vote during the conclave. (Note: Three European sovereigns of Catholic nations claimed this veto power: Austria, France and Spain.) Cardinal Jan Puzyna de Kosielsko, Archbishop of Kraków, declared the veto on the Austrian Emperor's behalf. Rampolla was reported to have received enough votes to win. (Note: The New York Times reported in 1913 that Rampolla had received 62 votes, amounting to the total number of cardinals voting.)

The Secretary of the Conclave, Archbishop Rafael Merry del Val, reported later that Cardinal Puzyna de Kosielsko came to see him, demanding to announce his veto against Cardinal Rampolla in the Emperor's name. Merry del Val protested and refused even to accept the document. Rampolla, according to Merry del Val, in fact actually attracted further votes subsequent to the veto. However, Merry del Val later told Ludwig von Pastor that he thought Rampolla was unlikely in any case to have won since a majority of the cardinals wanted a more conservative direction following the relatively liberal pontificate of Pope Leo XIII, an opinion he himself shared. (Note: Valérie Pirie also claims that Rampolla would never have won in the conclave, and that all that the veto accomplished was to make him appear a sympathetic figure as a victim of Austrian hostility "inasmuch as it gave his defeat the appearance of having been brought about by a treacherous knock-out blow, when in reality his failure was inevitable; the world at large being still convinced that had it not been for the Austrian veto Rampolla would certainly have been elected Pope.")

The specific reasons for Austria's opposition to Rampolla are unclear. The veto may have been based on the pro-French positions adopted by Rampolla, which were reflected in the policies of Leo XIII. Part of the Holy See's solution involving the French Third Republic was the attempt to reconcile French Catholics with their nation's republican government via laïcité. This was anathema to the powerful Ultramontanes. Others claimed that Austria-Hungary was acting, for reasons unspecified, on behalf of Italy's government through the intervention of State Minister, or that Austria-Hungary was acting on behalf of Germany. (Note: Another explanation is based on the murder/suicide of Franz Joseph's son, Crown Prince Rudolf in 1889. Rampolla was the Papal Secretary of State at the time of the Mayerling events, and he refused to grant the dispensation that would have allow Rudolf to be buried in consecrated ground. The official reason for Rudolf's death, however, was given as "mental imbalance", and that allowed for a Catholic burial.)

While some prelates formally protested this intrusion after voting had been in progress, the Ultramontanist Cardinals readily recognized the existing legal right of the Emperor. Support for Rampolla then dissipated, leading to the election of Giuseppe Sarto as Pope Pius X. Abolition of the right to such a veto was one of his first official acts, notified on 20 January 1904.

=== Later years ===
Cardinal Rampolla at age 70 shortly before his death

Pius X chose Rafael Merry del Val to succeed Rampolla as Secretary of State. Rampolla remained Archpriest of Saint Peter's Basilica. Between 1908 and his death in 1913, Rampolla served as Secretary (at the time the effective head) of the Holy Office. In 1912, Pope Pius X appointed Rampolla Archivist and Librarian of the Holy Roman Church as well, a position he held until his death. Rampolla continued to be viewed as a likely successor to Pope Pius X in case of the pontiff's death.

Rampolla died suddenly in Rome on 16 December 1913 at age seventy, some months before the death of Pius X in August 1914. He was buried in the Campo Verano Cemetery near the Basilica of San Lorenzo fuori le Mura. His friend and closest collaborator, Giacomo della Chiesa, who soon succeeded Pius X as Pope Benedict XV, presided over his funeral ceremonies. On 19 June 1929, twelve days after the Italian Parliament ratified the Lateran Treaty, the body of Cardinal Rampolla was transferred to Santa Cecilia in Trastevere.

== Bibliography ==
- Bräuer, Martin (2014). Handbuch der Kardinäle: 1846-2012. De Gruyter. ISBN 978-3-11-026947-5.
- Burkle-Young, Francis A. (2000). Papal Elections in the Age of Transition 1878-1922. Lanham: Lexington Books. ISBN 0-7391-0114-5.
- Cerami, Calogero. La figura e l'opera del cardinale Mariano Rampolla del Tindaro (Caltanissetta: S. Sciascia, 2006)[Storia e cultura di Sicilia, 19].
- Chadwick, Owen (2003). A History of the Popes, 1830-1914. New York-London: Oxford University Press. ISBN 978-0-19-926286-1.
- Frei, Peter. Die Papstwahl des Jahres 1903, unter besonderer Berucksichtigung des osterreichisch -ungarischen Vetos (Bern/Frankfurt a. Main 1977).
- Larkin, Maurice. Church and State after the Dreyfus Affair: The Separation Issue in France (New York: Harper & Row, Springer, 1974), 40–89; 117–133.
- Lonyay, Graf Karoly (1950). Rudolf; the tragedy of Mayerling. London: H. Hamilton.
- [Mathieu, Cardinal François Désiré]. Les derniers jours de Léon XIII et le Conclave, par un Temoin (Paris: Librarie Victor Lecoffre 1904), 98-115.
- Sinopoli di Giunta, G. Pietro. Il Cardinale Mariano Rampolla del Tindaro (Rome: Vatican Press, 1923).
- Pollard, John (20 June 2005). Benedict XV: The Unknown Pope and the Pursuit of Peace. London: A&C Black. ISBN 978-0-86012-408-5.
- Trincia, Luciano (2004). Conclave e potere politico: il veto a Rampolla nel sistema delle potenze europee, 1887-1904. Roma: Studium. ISBN 978-88-382-3949-6.
- Various (1967). The World Book Encyclopaedia:Q-R (Volume 16).
- Waal, Anton de (1915). Benedict XV. Hamm: Breer & Thiemann.

Catholic Church titles
Preceded by Angelo Bianchi	Nuncio to Spain; 19 December 1882 – 2 June 1887	Succeeded by Angelo Di Pietro
Preceded by Luigi Jacobini	Cardinal Secretary of State; 2 June 1887 – 20 July 1903	Succeeded by Rafael Merry del Val
Preceded by Gaetano Aloisi Masella	Camerlengo of the Sacred College of Cardinals; 16 January 1893 – 18 May 1894	Succeeded by Fulco Luigi Ruffo-Scilla
Preceded by Francesco Ricci Paracciani	Archpriest of St. Peter's Basilica; 21 March 1894 – 16 December 1913	Succeeded by Rafael Merry del Val
Preceded by Serafino Vannutelli	Secretary of the Supreme Sacred Congregation of the Holy Office; 30 December 1908 – 16 December 1913	Succeeded by Domenico Ferrata
Preceded by Francesco Salesio Della Volpe	Archivist of the Holy Roman Church; 26 November 1912 – 16 December 1913	Succeeded by Francesco di Paola Cassetta
