= Donato Sbarretti =

Italian Roman Catholic Cardinal

His Eminence Donato Sbarretti
- Secretary of the Congregation of the Holy Office
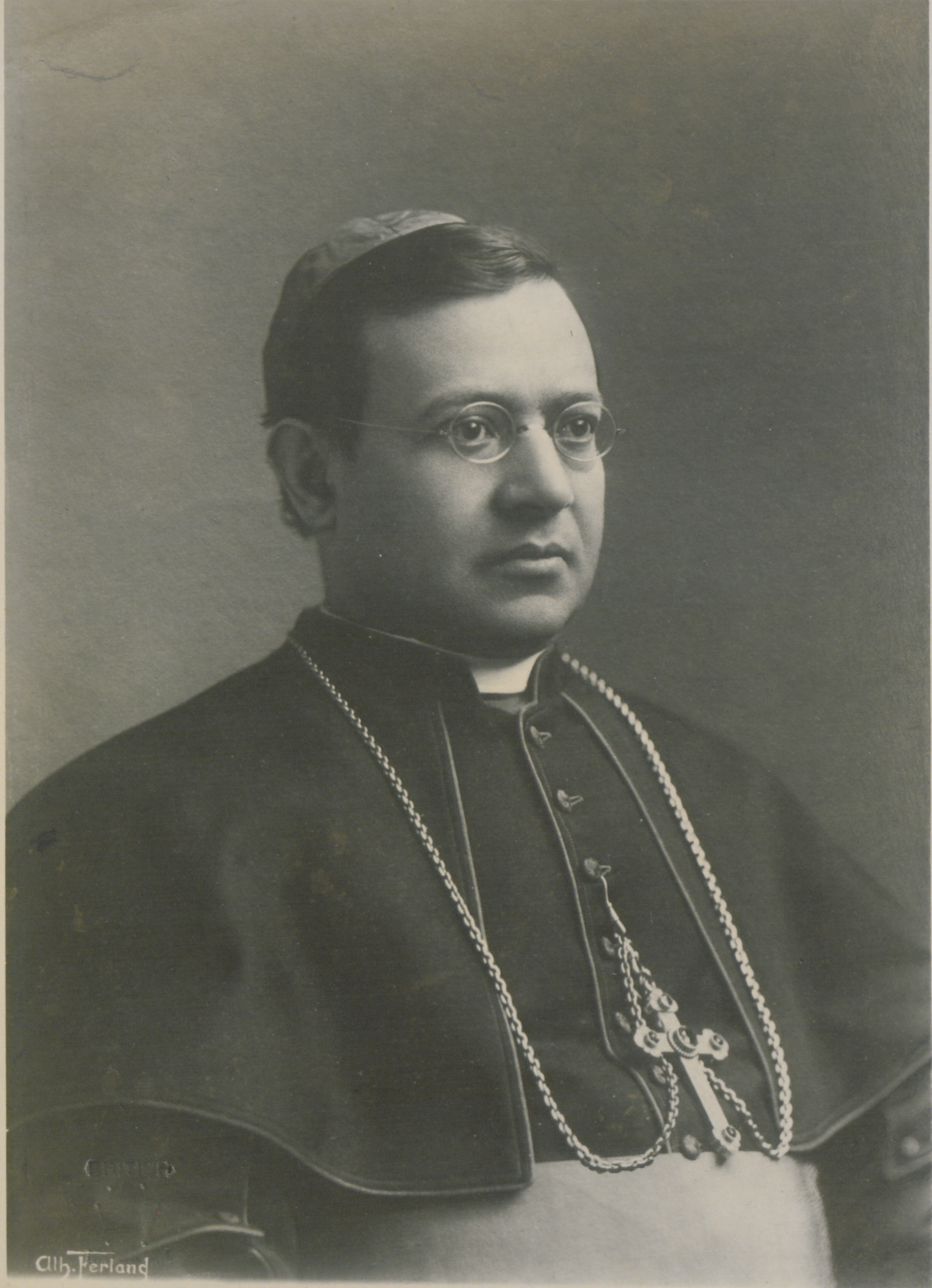
- Sbarretti pictured in 1903.
- Church: Roman Catholic Church
- Appointed: 4 July 1930
- Term ended: 1 April 1939
- Predecessor: Rafael Merry del Val y Zulueta
- Successor: Francesco Marchetti Selvaggiani
- Other posts: Cardinal-Bishop of Sabina e Poggio Mirteto (1928–39); Vice-Dean of the College of Cardinals (1935–39)
- Previous posts: Bishop of La Habana (1900–01); Titular Archbishop of Gortyna (1901); Apostolic Delegate to the Philippines (1901–02); Titular Archbishop of Ephesus (1901–16); Apostolic Delegate to Canada and Newfoundland (1902–10); Secretary of the Congregation of Religious (1910–16); Assessor of the Congregation of the Holy Office (1914–16); Cardinal-Priest of San Silvestro in Capite (1916–28); Prefect of the Congregation of the Council (1919–30); Camerlengo of the College of Cardinals (1926–27)

Orders
- Ordination: 12 April 1879 by Raffaele Monaco La Valletta
- Consecration: 4 February 1900 by Sebastiano Martinelli
- Created cardinal: 4 December 1916 by Pope Benedict XV
- Rank: Cardinal-Priest (1916–28); Cardinal-Bishop (1928–39)

Personal details
- Born: Donato Raffaele Sbarretti; 12 November 1856 Montefranco, Spoleto, Papal States
- Died: 1 April 1939 (aged 82) Rome, Kingdom of Italy
- Parents: Agostino Donato Flavio Sbarretti; Caterina Tazza
- Education: Pontifical Roman Athenaeum Saint Apollinare
- Motto: Respice stellam voca Mariam
- Coat of arms

Styles of Donato Raffaele Sbarretti Tazza
- Reference style: His Eminence
- Spoken style: Your Eminence
- Informal style: Cardinal
- See: Albano (suburbicarian see)

Donato Raffaele Sbarretti Tazza (November 1856 – 1 April 1939) was an Italian Roman Catholic Cardinal whose career included pastoral service in Italy and Cuba, diplomatic service in America and the Pacific, and ultimately high office in the Roman Curia.

== Biography ==
Born in Montefranco di Spoleto, Sbarretti was educated and first served in the Archdiocese of Spoleto.

His uncle, Enea Sbarretti, was named a Cardinal in 1877, two years before Donato was ordained a priest at the age of 22. However, Donato Sbarretti's career advancement cannot be ascribed to nepotism; his uncle's longtime patron Pope Pius IX had died before Donato even became a priest, and his uncle died in 1884, when Donato's career was barely underway.

In 1893, after pastoral work, teaching, and minor curial staff positions, such as a minutante at Propaganda, Sbarretti was made canon of a church in Rome and posted to the United States as auditor in the apostolic delegation. In 1895 he was named a privy chamberlain, then the lowest grade of monsignor.

His next postings were results of the aftermath of the Spanish–American War, as he was named Bishop of Havana in 1900, serving only briefly, before the Holy See named him Apostolic Delegate Extraordinary to settle an urgent matter in the Philippines. The United States Government refused to allow him to take up this posting because they wanted to negotiate this issue with their own special mission to the Vatican under William Howard Taft. Before the end of 1902 Sbarretti was sent to Canada as Apostolic Delegate and remained there until recalled to Rome in 1910. For Sbarretti, evangelization of Protestants in Canada was a deeply important issue.

In 1916, Pope Benedict XV elevated Sbarretti to the cardinalate as Cardinal-Priest of San Silvestro in Capite. Then serving as Assessor of the Sacred Congregation of the Holy Office, he became Prefect of the Sacred Congregation of the council (predecessor of today's Dicastery for the Clergy) in 1919. A Cardinal Bishop after 1928, he finally became Secretary of the Holy Office (today's Dicastery for the Doctrine of the Faith), of which the Pope then personally served as Prefect in 1930, and Vice-Dean of the Sacred College of Cardinals in 1935.

He died less than a month after participating in the conclave that elected Pope Pius XII, and according to his will was buried in the parish church of Montefranco, where he had been born.

== Notes ==
Catholic Church titles
Preceded by Placide Louis Chapelle	Apostolic Delegate to the Philippines; 1901–1902	Succeeded by Giovanni Battista Guidi
Preceded by Diomede Falconio	Apostolic Delegate to Canada and Newfoundland; 26 December 1902 – 29 October 1910	Succeeded by Pellegrino Francesco Stagni
Preceded by Rafael Merry del Val	Secretary of the Supreme Sacred Congregation of the Holy Office; 4 July 1930 – 1 April 1939	Succeeded by Francesco Marchetti-Selvaggiani
