= Serafino Vannutelli =

Italian prelate (1834–1915)

His Eminence Serafino Vannutelli
- Dean of the College of Cardinals
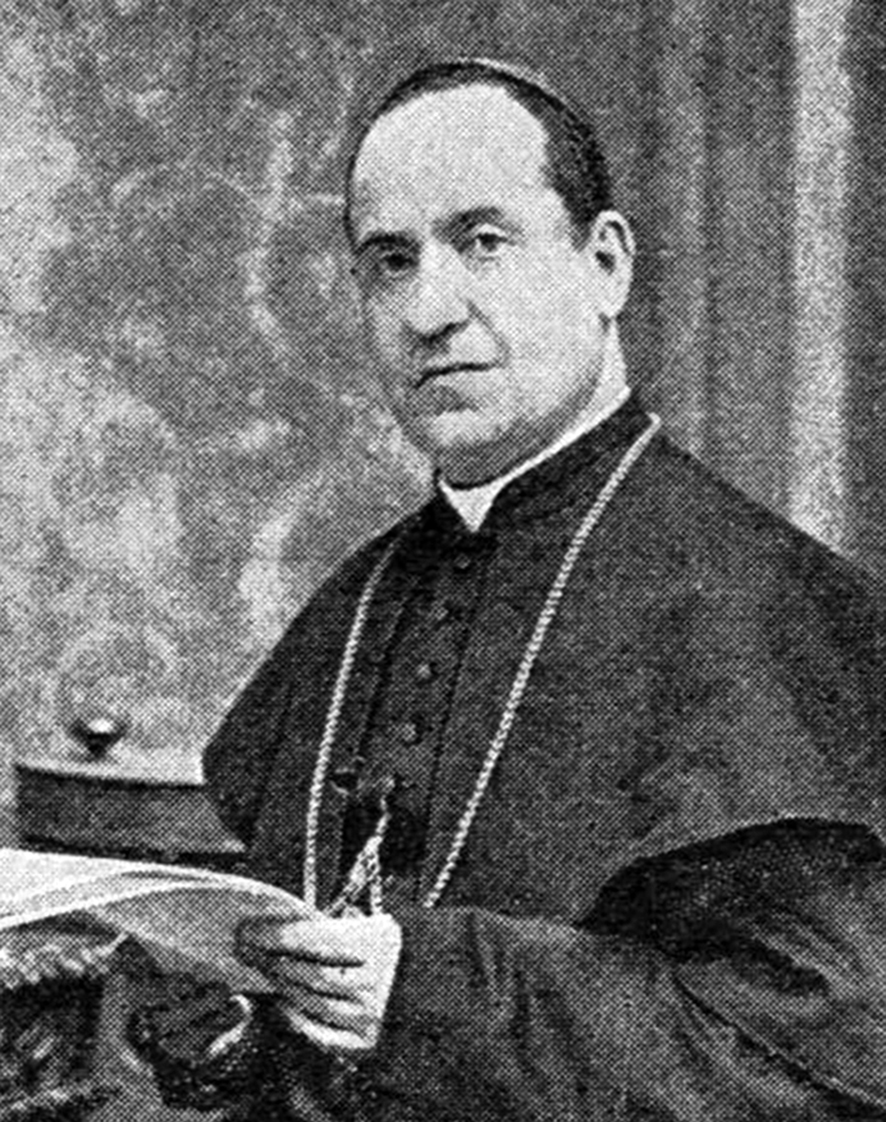
- Church: Catholic Church
- Appointed: 7 December 1913
- Term ended: 19 August 1915
- Predecessor: Luigi Oreglia di Santo Stefano
- Successor: Vincenzo Vannutelli
- Other posts: Major Penitentiary of the Apostolic Penitentiary (1899–1915); Cardinal-Bishop of Ostia (1914–15); Prefect of the Congregation of Ceremonies (1914–15)
- Previous posts: Titular Archbishop of Nicaea (1869–87); Apostolic Delegate to Colombia (1869–75); Apostolic Delegate to Costa Rica (1869–75); Apostolic Delegate to Nicaragua (1869–75); Apostolic Delegate to Honduras (1869–75); Apostolic Delegate to Ecuador (1869–75); Apostolic Delegate to Peru (1869–75); Apostolic Delegate to Bolivia (1869–75); Apostolic Delegate to Venezuela (1869–75); Apostolic Nuncio to Belgium (1875–80); Apostolic Nuncio to Austria-Hungary (1880–87); Cardinal-Priest of Santa Sabina (1887–89); Prefect of the Congregation of Indulgences and Sacred Relics (1888–91); Cardinal-Priest of San Girolamo dei Croati (1889–93); Camerlengo of the College of Cardinals (1891–92); Archbishop of Bologna (1893); Cardinal-Bishop of Frascati (1893–1903); Prefect of the Congregation of the Index (1893–96); Pro-Prefect of the Congregation of Bishops and Regulars (1896–99); Secretary of the Congregation of the Holy Office (1903–08); Cardinal-Bishop of Porto e Santa Rufina (1903–14)

Orders
- Ordination: 22 December 1860 by Costantino Patrizi Naro
- Consecration: 18 July 1869 by Costantino Patrizi Naro
- Created cardinal: 14 March 1887 by Pope Leo XIII
- Rank: Cardinal-Priest (1887–93); Cardinal-Bishop (1893–1915)

Personal details
- Born: Serafino Vannutelli; 26 November 1834 Genazzano, Palestrina, Papal States
- Died: 19 August 1915 (aged 80) Rome, Kingdom of Italy
- Buried: Campo Verano
- Education: Collegio Capranica; Collegio Romano
- Coat of arms: Serafino Vannutelli's coat of arms

Styles of Serafino Vannutelli
- Informal style: Cardinal
- See: Ostia (suburbicarian see) Porto e Santa Rufina (suburbicarian see)

Serafino Vannutelli (26 November 1834 – 19 August 1915) was an Italian prelate of the Catholic Church, a cardinal and official of the Roman Curia where he held several of the highest administrative posts. Made a cardinal in 1887, he was named a cardinal-bishop in 1893 and elected dean of the College of Cardinals in 1915 and he died shortly after. He was thought a possible candidate for the papacy in 1903.

At the start of his career, he worked in the diplomatic service of the Holy See from 1869 to 1887, serving as Apostolic Delegate to several Latin American countries and as Apostolic Nuncio to Belgium and Austria.

His younger brother Vincenzo (1836–1930) was also a Catholic cardinal.

== Biography ==
Vannutelli was born in Genazzano, in the diocese of Palestrina, where he studied and graduated in philosophy before studying theology at the Capranica College, Rome. After teaching theology at the Pontifical Seminary, he began his work in the diplomatic service of the Holy See as secretary to the Papal Nuncio in Bavaria. He became auditor to the Nuncio at the Court of Maximilian in Mexico.

On 25 June 1869, he was appointed Titular Archbishop of Nicaea and on 18 July was consecrated a bishop by Cardinal Costantino Patrizi Naro. On 23 July 1869, he was named Apostolic Delegate to Ecuador, Peru, Colombia, and Central America, which comprised these countries: El Salvador, Guatemala, Costa Rica, Honduras, and Nicaragua. He was made Apostolic Nuncio to Brussels in 1875, but his role there ended abruptly when the Belgian government broke off diplomatic relations with the Holy See on 28 June 1880. He became Apostolic Nuncio to Austria on 18 November of that year.

His service as a nuncio ended when Pope Leo XIII made him a cardinal on 14 March 1887. As a Cardinal-Priest he was initially assigned the title of Santa Sabina, and then assigned to San Girolamo dei Croati on 11 February 1889.

On 16 January 1893, after Vannutelli reportedly declined an appointment as Secretary of State, Pope Leo XIII named him Archbishop of Bologna, an assignment considered an exile from Rome. The Pope wrote a letter to the people of Bologna saying that he had been guided by divine inspiration in making the appointment and was reported to have said "Vannutelli goes to Bologna Cardinal and will return a Pope". The New York Times commented: "He has for some time been prominently mentioned in connection with the Papal succession, and is supported by an influential ecclesiastical party, with whom, it is believed, Pope Leo is in sympathy." He served until he was named Cardinal-Bishop of Frascati just six months later on 12 June 1893.

From 1899 until his death in 1915, he was Cardinal Major Penitentiary.

He served as Secretary of the Congregation of the Roman and Universal Inquisition (later known as the Congregation for the Doctrine of the Faith), from 16 January 1903 until he resigned that office on 31 December 1908 at the age of 74. On 22 June 1903 he was moved from Frascati to become Cardinal-Bishop of Porto Santa e Rufina. At the conclave in 1903 that elected Pope Pius X, he was considered a contender for election to the papacy.

On 25 May 1914, Pope Pius X approved his election as Dean of the College of Cardinals, adding the title of Cardinal-Bishop of Ostia to his other titles. Performing the duties of Dean during the conclave that met in August 1914 proved challenging, as he was "almost blind ... stone deaf ... and weakened from nervous prostration". En route to that conclave from Naples, his train was bombed, and several other passengers were injured.

He died in Rome on 19 August 1915.

Catholic Church titles
Preceded by Francesco Battaglini	Archbishop of Bologna; 16 January 1893 – 12 June 1893	Succeeded by Domenico Svampa
Preceded by Isidoro Verga	Major Penitentiary of Apostolic Penitentiary; 20 November 1899 – 19 August 1915	Succeeded by Willem Marinus van Rossum
Preceded by Lucido Parocchi	Secretary of the Supreme Sacred Congregation of the Holy Office; 16 January 1903 – 31 December 1908	Succeeded by Mariano Rampolla del Tindaro
Preceded by Luigi Oreglia di Santo Stefano	Dean of the Sacred College of Cardinals; 7 December 1913 – 19 August 1916	Succeeded by Vincenzo Vannutelli
