= Casimiro Gennari =

Italian cardinal

His Eminence Casimiro Gennari
- Prefect of the Congregation of the Council
- Church: Roman Catholic Church
- Appointed: 20 October 1908
- Term ended: 31 January 1914
- Predecessor: Vincenzo Vannutelli
- Successor: Francesco di Paola Cassetta
- Other post: Cardinal-Priest of San Marcello (1901–14)
- Previous posts: Bishop of Conversano (1881–97); Apostolic Administrator of Bari e Canosa (1886–87); Assessor of the Commission for Roman and Universal Inquisition (1895–1901); Titular Archbishop of Naupactus (1897–1901); Camerlengo of the College of Cardinals (1909–11)

Orders
- Ordination: 21 March 1863 by Michele Bombini
- Consecration: 15 May 1881 by Edward Henry Howard of Norfolk
- Created cardinal: 15 April 1901 by Pope Leo XIII
- Rank: Cardinal-Priest

Personal details
- Born: Casimiro Gennari; 29 December 1839 Maratea, Kingdom of the Two Sicilies
- Died: 31 January 1914 (aged 74) Palazzo Borghese, Rome, Kingdom of Italy
- Parents: Nicola Gennari; Gaetana Crispino

Styles of Casimiro Gennari
- Reference style: His Eminence
- Spoken style: Your Eminence
- Informal style: Cardinal
- See: Lepanto (titular see)

Casimiro Gennari (29 December 1839 – 31 January 1914) was an Italian cardinal of the Roman Catholic Church and was former Prefect of the Congregation of the Council.

== Early life and priesthood ==
Casimiro Gennari was born in Maratea, Basilicata. His father was the mayor of Maratea and he was related to the former Bishop of Montemarano. He studied with the Jesuits in Naples and at the seminary of Salerno. He received minor orders in 1860.

He was ordained to the priesthood on 21 March 1863 in Salerno. He then did pastoral care in the diocese of Conversano. He was the founder of the monthly Il Monitore Ecclesiastico, to help the clergy be in tune with the teaching of the Church, and was the first of its kind.

== Episcopate ==
He was appointed as Bishop of Conversano on 13 May 1881. He was consecrated, two days later, by Cardinal Edward Howard. He was named assessor of the Congregation of the Holy Office on 15 November 1895. He was promoted to the titular see of Lepanto on 6 February 1897 but retained the administration of the see of Conversano.

== Cardinalate ==
He was created Cardinal-Priest of San Marcello on 15 April 1901 by Pope Leo XIII. He participated in conclave of 1903 that elected Pope Pius X.

Gennari wrote the text of the papal decree Sacra Tridentina Synodus.

He was appointed as Prefect of the Congregation of the Council on 20 October 1908 by Pope Pius, holding the post until his death in 1914.

Catholic Church titles
Preceded by Filippo Giustini	Prefect of the Congregation of the Council; 20 October 1908 – 31 January 1914	Succeeded by Domenico Jorio
