= Santa Pudenziana =

Basilica of Saint Pudentiana
- Basilica Minor of Santa Pudenziana
- La Basilica Menor de Santa Potenciana
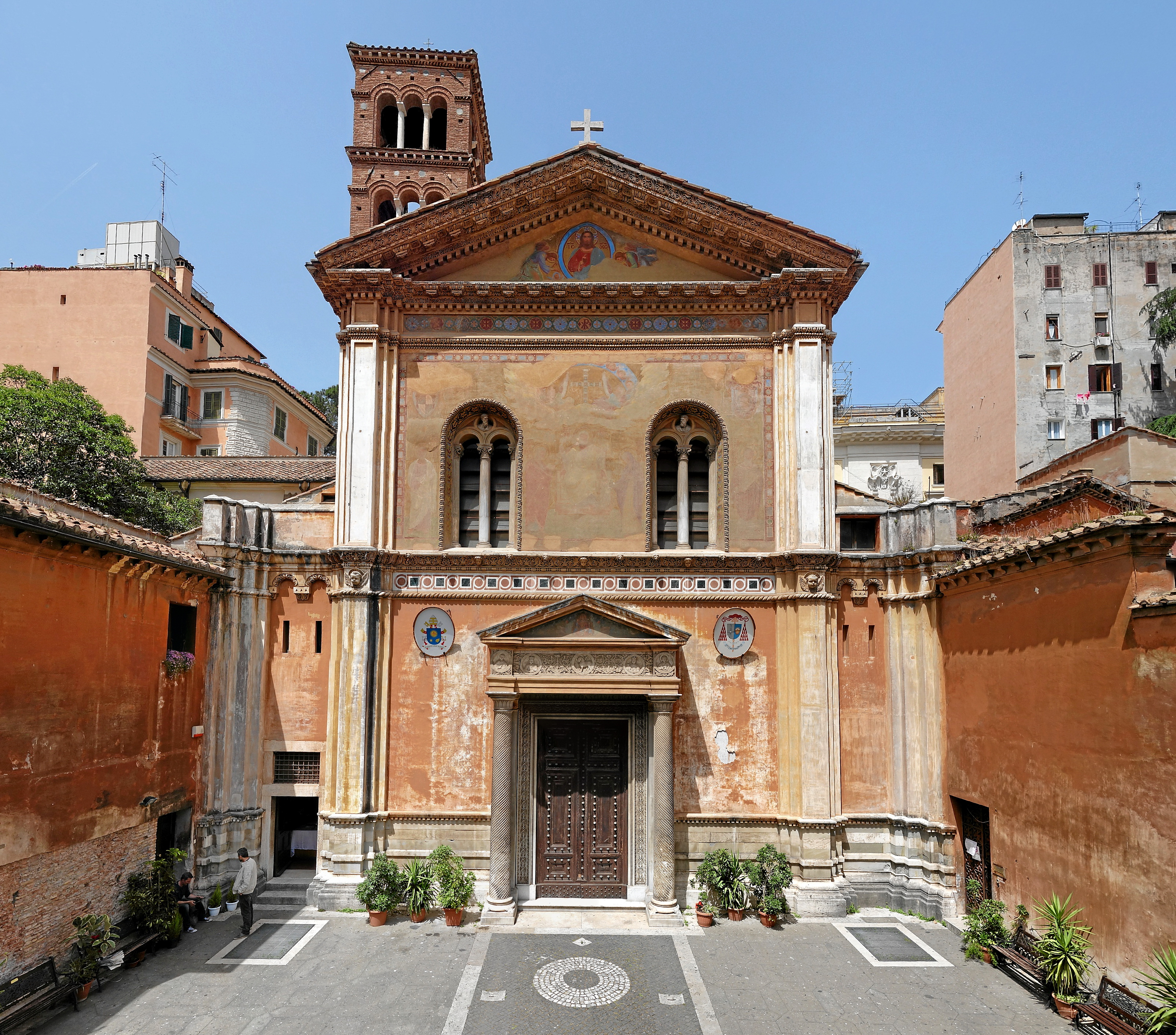
- Frontal main entrance below the street level
- Click on the map for a fullscreen view
- 41°53′54.3″N 12°29′44″E
- Location: Via Urbana 160, Rome
- Country: Italy
- Language(s): Latin, Italian, Tagalog
- Denomination: Catholic
- Sui iuris church: Latin Church
- Website: stpudenziana.org

History
- Status: Titular Church; Minor Basilica; National Church
- Founded: Fourth century
- Dedication: Saint Pudentiana

Architecture
- Architect(s): Francesco da Volterra, Antonio Manno
- Architectural type: Paleochristian, Romanesque
- Completed: 1588

Administration
- Diocese: Rome

The Basilica of Santa Pudentiana is the eldest Roman Catholic basilica built in the fourth century in Rome. The original shrine building dates back from the second century and is dedicated to Saint Pudentiana, sister to Praxedes the martyress. Both were daughters of Saint Pudens (whom mentioned by Paul the Apostle in 2 Timothy, 4: 21).

The basilica was the original residence of the Pope during the time of Emperor Marcus Aurelius until 313, when the Emperor Constantine the Great legalized Christianity and offered the Lateran Palace as a church. The historicity of the site is purported to be an adjective used to describe the previous house of the Roman senator Quintus Cornelius Pudens, the Domus Pudentiana. Accordingly, Saint Peter the Apostle is purported to have lived here for a brief time, while the first recorded proprietor of the established basilica was a Christian merchant named Pastore.

The basilica is sometimes locally known as Basilica della Pudenziana al Viminale due to its proximity to the smallest of the Seven Hills of Rome later associated with the Roman willow trees found nearby the site.

Santa Pudentiana is one of the national churches in Rome designated for the Philippines and is both piously and culturally associated with the Filipino peoples. It is designated a basilica by the privilege of immemorial status.

== Historicity ==
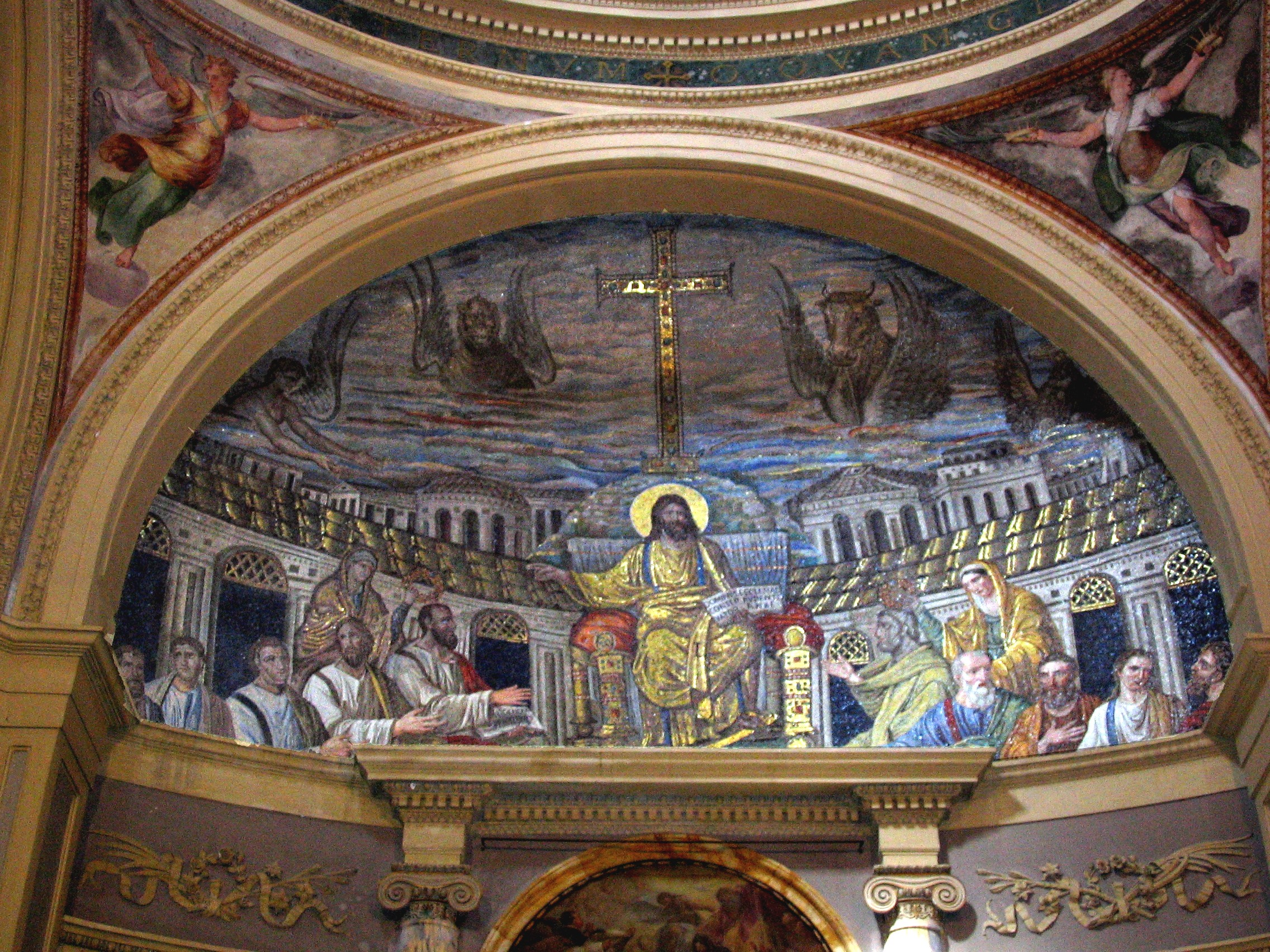
Christ enthroned among the Apostles, apse mosaic (enhanced image), a Paleochristian mosaic, circa 420

The Basilica of Santa Pudenziana is recognized as the eldest historical place of Christian worship in Rome. It was erected over a 2nd-century house, probably during the reign of Pope Pius I in 140–55, re-using part of a Roman thermae bath facility, still visible in the structure of the apse.

The structure was the official residence of the Roman Pontiff until in 313 A. D. when the reigning Emperor Constantine the Great offered the Lateran Palace in its stead along with the official legalization of Christianity within the Roman Empire.

In the fourth century, during the Pontificate of Pope Siricius, the building was transformed into a Christian basilica. In the acts of the synod of year 499, the building bore the insignia De Titulus Pudentis, indicating that the administration of the Holy Sacraments was permitted at the site.

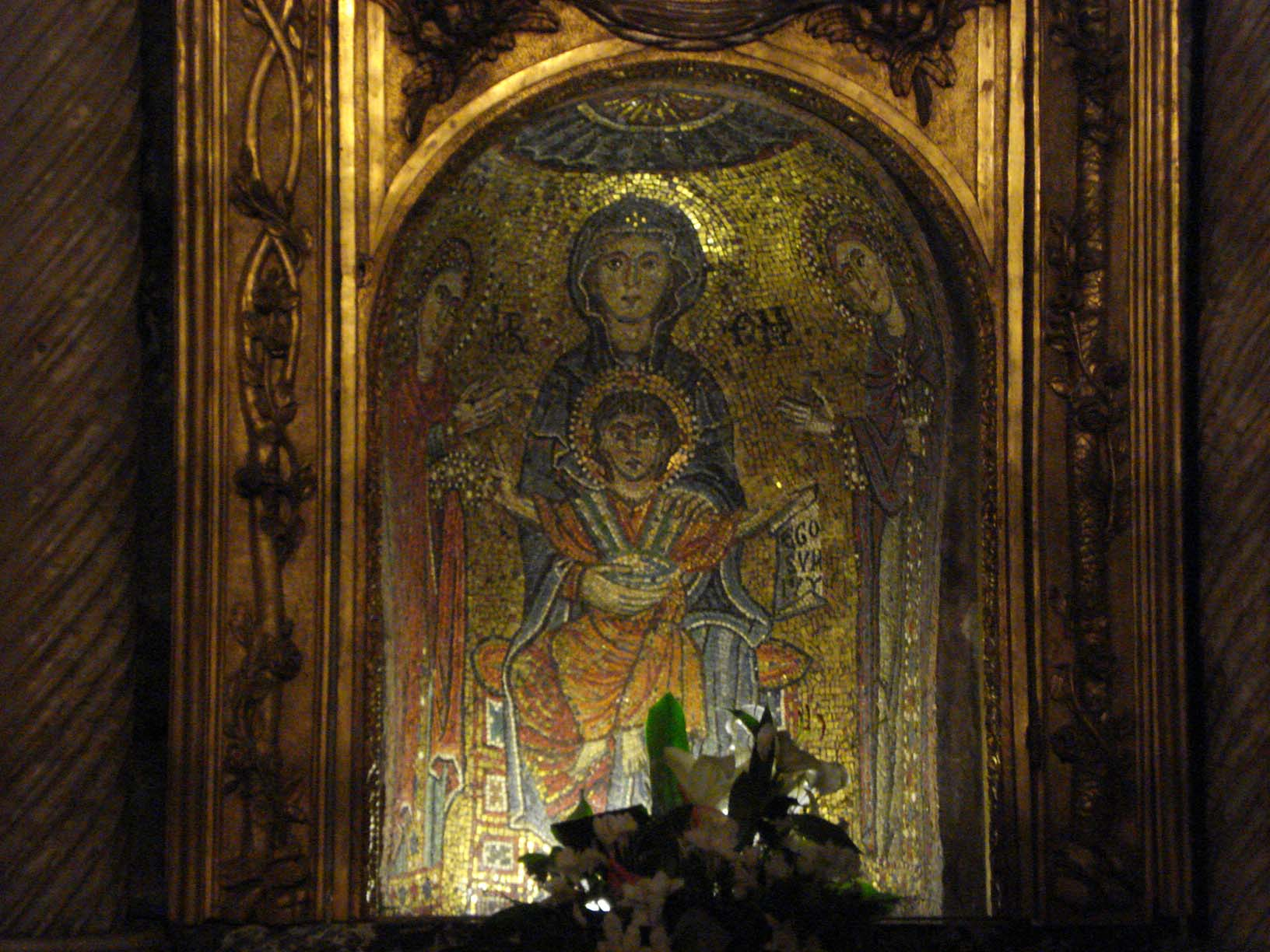
Ancient Roman mosaic depicting the Madonna and Child flanked by the sisters Pudenziana and Praxedes. The Chapel of Saint Zeno at the Basilica of Saint Praxedes

The basilica is situated lower than the modern street level. Entrance is through wrought-iron gates. Steps that were added in the 19th century descend to a square courtyard from both sides of the entrance. The architrave of the entrance hall of the faded façade (1870) has a marble frieze that used to belong to a portal of the 11th century. It is a significant work of medieval sculpture in Rome. From left to right it depicts Pastore, the first owner of the basilica; Pudentiana; Praxedes; and their father, Pudens. The existing columns in the nave were part of the original edifice.

On the top—left tympanum door shows Pastore and Pudentiana. On the right side is Praxedes and her father Pudens.

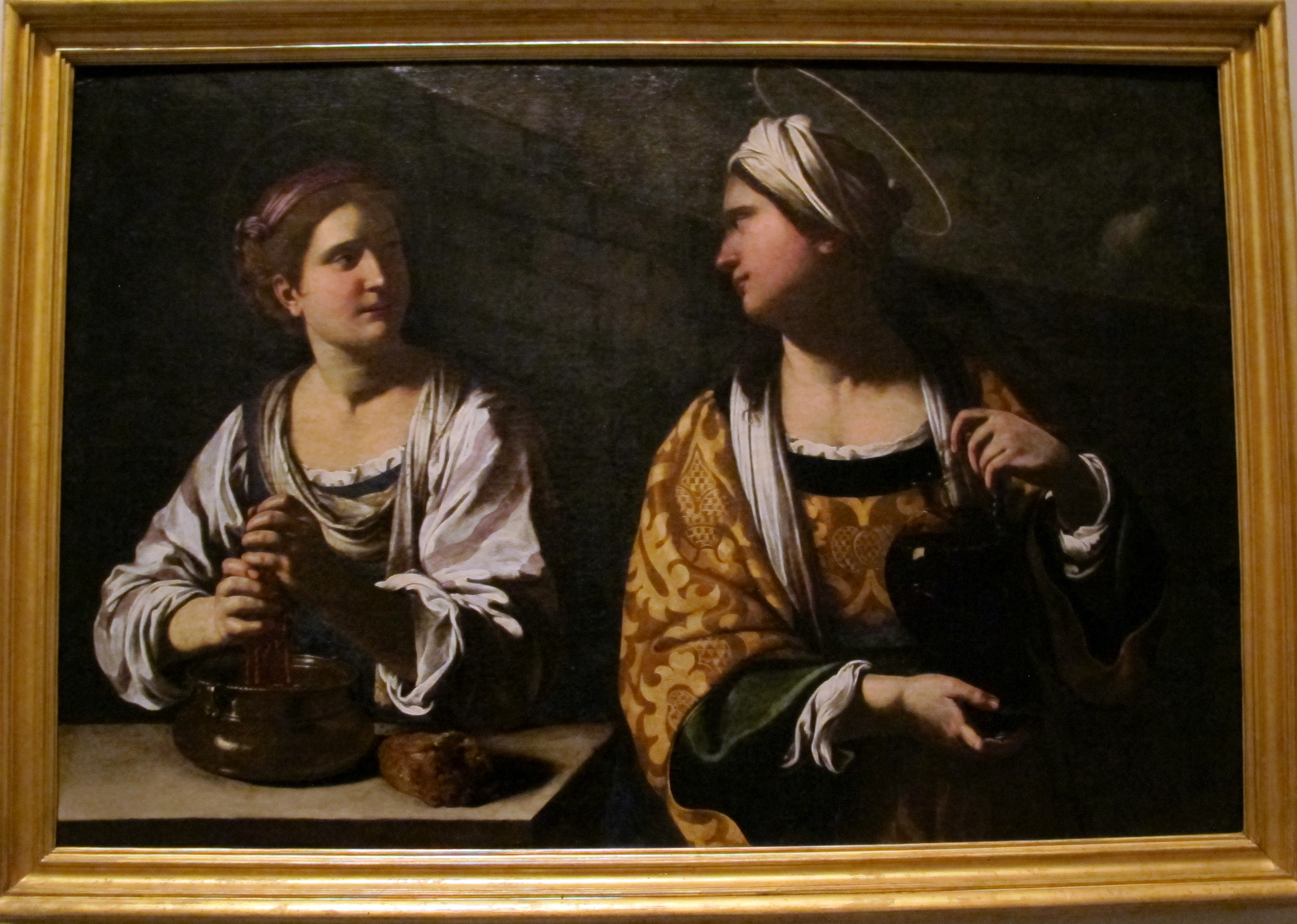
The sisters Praxedes and Pudentiana, by Antiveduto Grammatica (1571—1626)

The Romanesque architecture and belltower was added in the early thirteenth century. Restorations of 1388 by Francesco da Volterra, pursuant to order of the former Camerlengo of the Holy Roman Church, Cardinal Enrico Caetani who transformed the three naves into one and a dome was added that Francesco da Volterra also designed. The painting of Angels and Saints before the Savior in the interior of the dome is a fresco by Pomarancio. During these last restorations some fragments of a Laocoön group were found that were larger than those in the Vatican City. Because none was willing to pay extra for this find, the hole in the ground was filled. These fragments were never recovered. The façade was renewed in 1870 and Pietro Gagliardi added frescoes.

The right side of the basilica was part of a Roman thermae, i. e. bath house, dating to the reign of the Roman Emperor Ælius Publius Hadrian (AD 117–38).

Within the Chapel of Saint Peter, a wooden relic of the purported original altar table was preserved, piously claimed to have been used by Saint Peter the Apostle for the Pudente family during his residence there.

The Basilica is currently making renovations within the building and the facade of the shrine to accommodate pilgrims, scheduled to complete in 2027.

== Interior ==
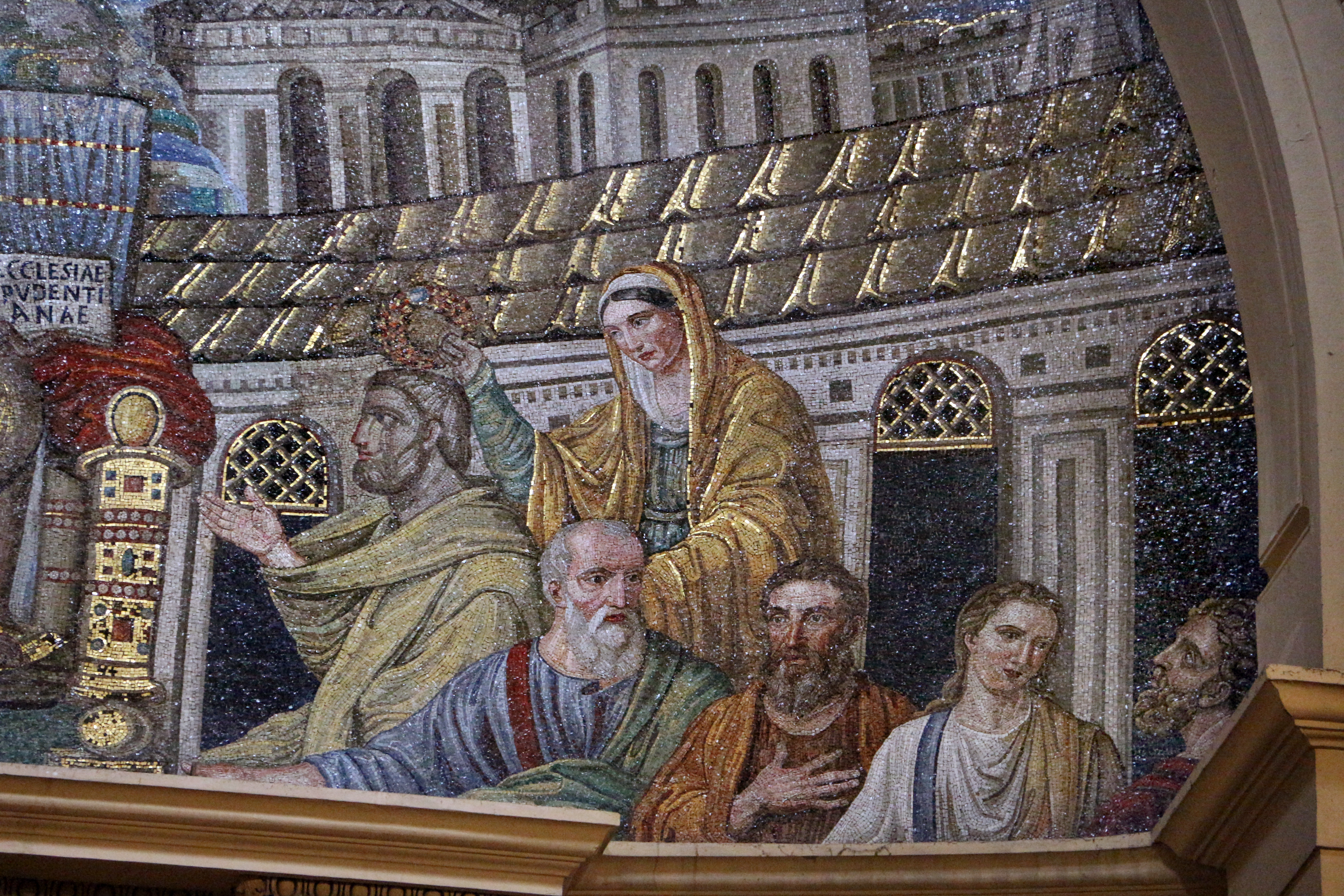
Detail of the 5th—century Paleochristian mosaic on the high altar

On the wall behind the high altar are three paintings made in 1803 by Bernardino Nocchi representing (from left to right): Saint Timotheus, The Glory of Saint Pudentiana, and Saint Novatus.

The mosaic in the apse is late antique, from around the end of the 4th century; it is regarded by different groups of scholars as dating to either the pontificate of Pope Siricius (384–399) or of Innocent I (401–417), and was heavily restored in the 16th century. It is among the oldest Christian mosaics in Rome and one of the most striking mosaics outside of Ravenna, deemed the most beautiful mosaic in Rome by the 19th-century German historian Ferdinand Gregorovius.

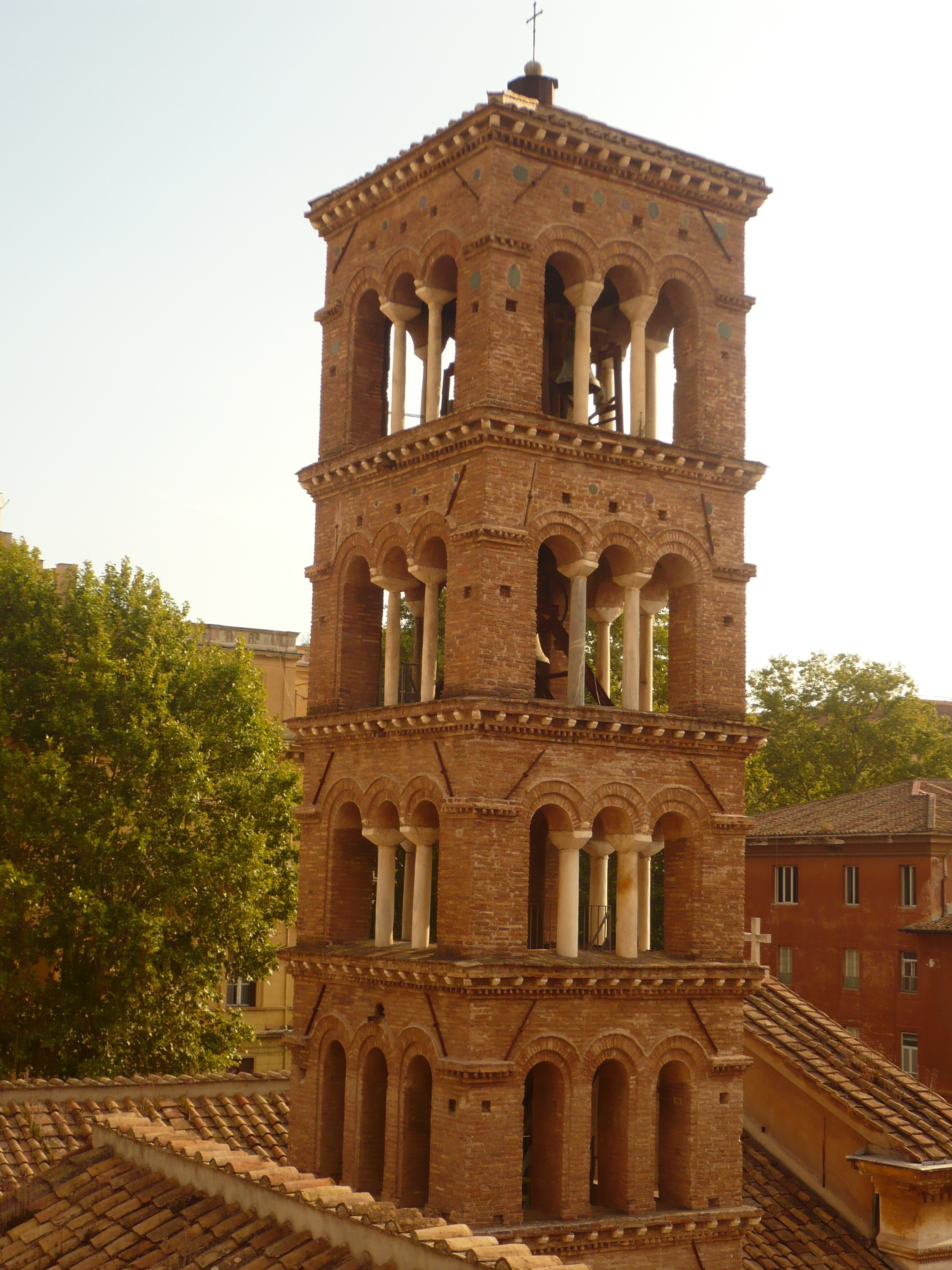
The medieval bell tower of the Basilica

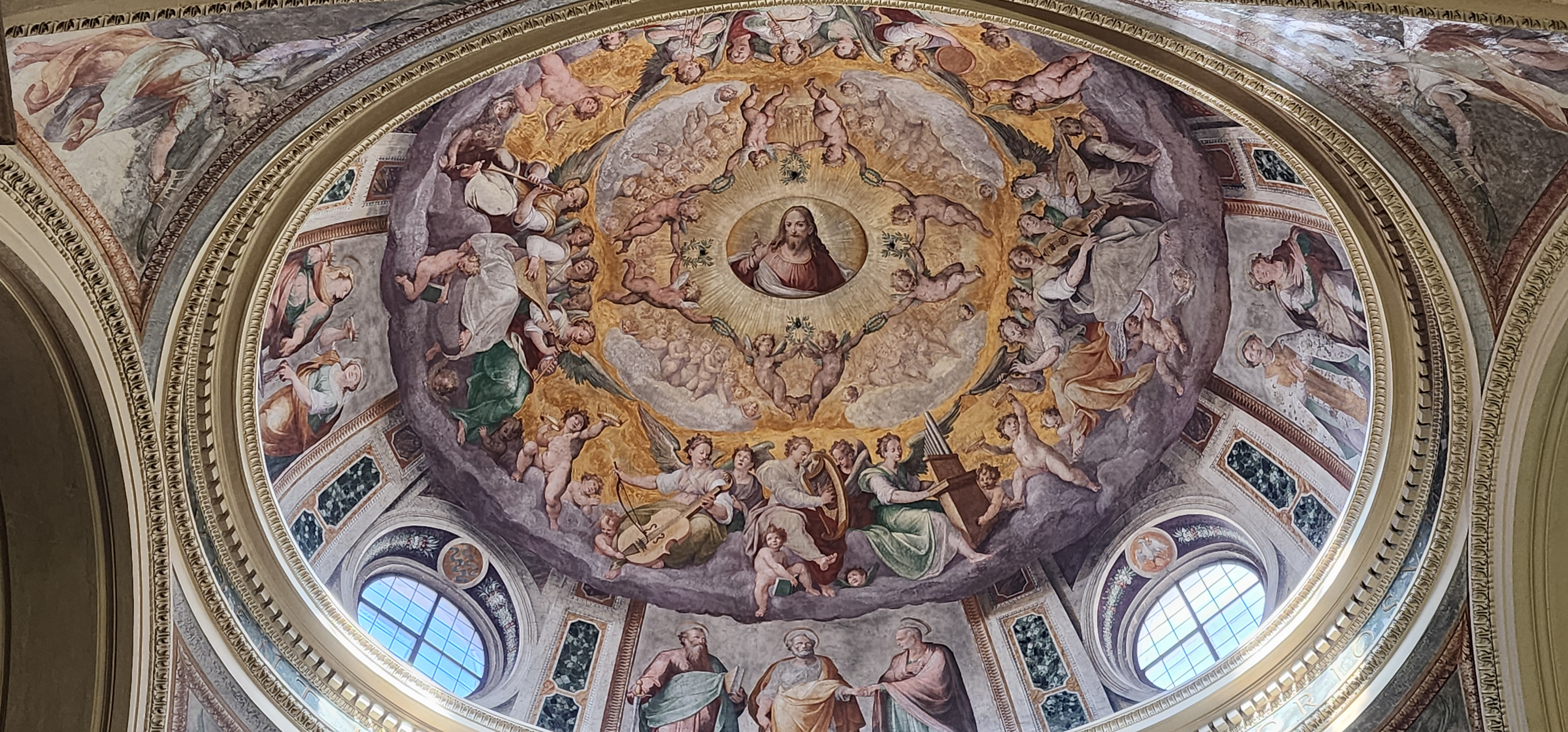
The fresco in the dome's cupola depicts The Adoration of Christ by the Host of Heaven by Cristoforo Roncalli, also known as il Pomarancio. This is the first elliptical dome built in Rome.

This mosaic is remarkable for its iconography. Christ is represented as a human figure rather than as a symbol, such as lamb or the good shepherd, as he was in very early Christian images. The regal nature of this representation prefigures the majestic bearing of Christ as depicted in Byzantine mosaics. Christ sits on a jewel encrusted throne, wearing a golden toga with a purple trim (a sign of imperial authority and emphasizing the authority of Christ and his church). He poses as a classical Roman teacher with his right hand extended. Christ wears a halo and holds in his left hand the text: "Dominus conservator ecclesiae Pudentianae" (The Lord is the preserver of the church of Pudentiana). He sits among his apostles, two of whom were removed during restoration. The apostles wear senatorial togas. They all have individual expressions and face the spectator. The lower part of the mosaic was removed during the restoration in the late 16th century. The depictions of the apostles on the right side have been lost in the course of time and have been replaced by new, but rather blank, mosaics. Two female figures representing Ecclesia and Synagoga ("Church" and "Synagogue"), here hardly differentiated, unlike later depictions, hold a wreath above the head of Peter and Paul. Above them the roofs and domes of heavenly Jerusalem (or, in another interpretation, the churches built by the emperor Constantine in Jerusalem) are depicted. Above Christ stands a large jewel encrusted cross on a hill (Golgotha), as a sign of the triumph of Christ, amidst the Christian symbols of the Four Evangelists. These iconographic symbols (angel, lion, ox and eagle) are the oldest still existing such representations of the Evangelists. The backdrop is a blue sky with an orange sunset.

One scholar has suggested that the enthroned figure in the center of the apse mosaic normally regarded as Christ, in fact represents God the Father, which would be an extremely unusual depiction of God the Father in art at this date.

=== List of Chapels ===
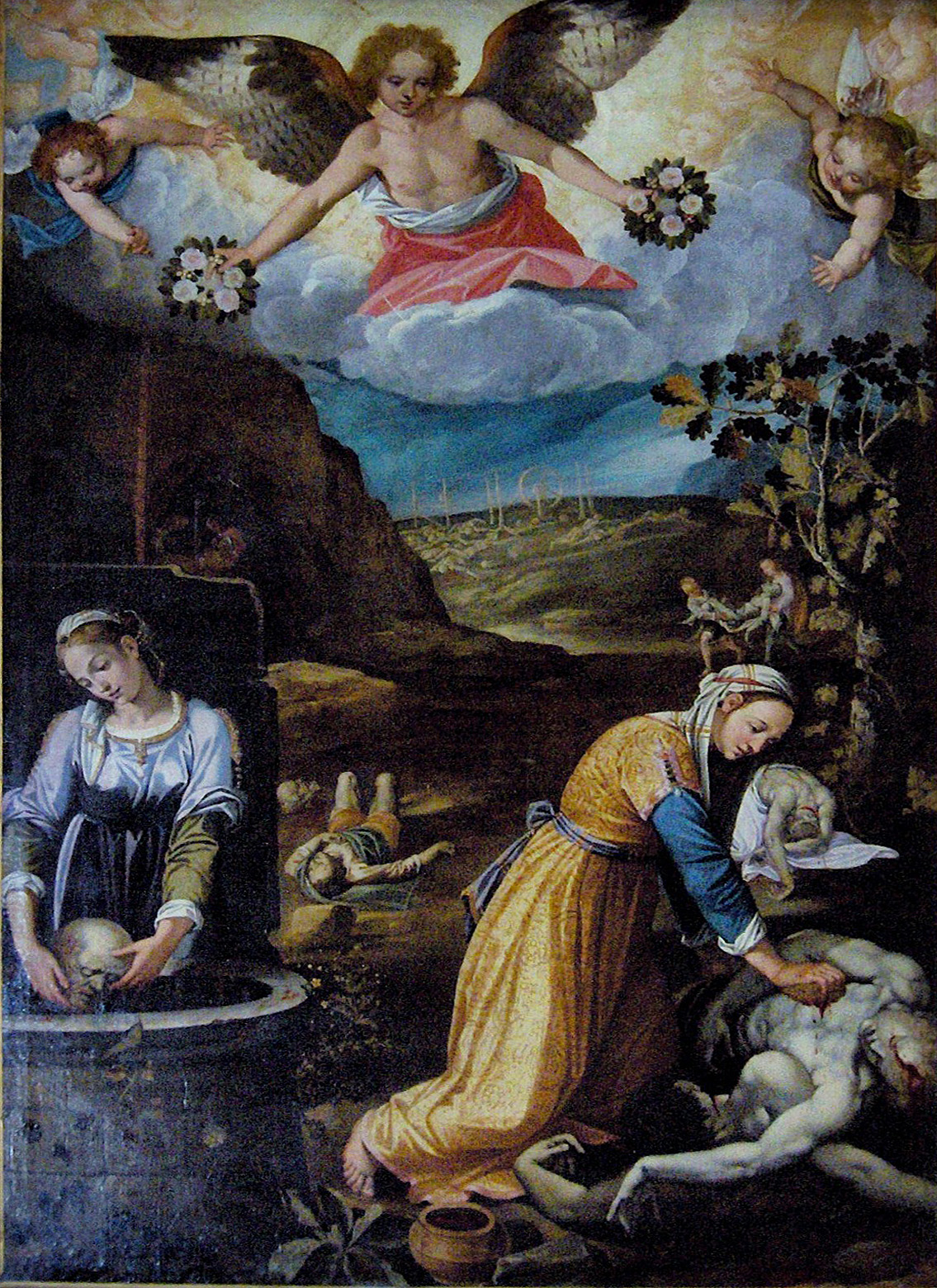
Saint Praxedes and Pudenziana collecting the Blood of the Martyrs by Giovanni Paolo Rossetti

- The “Chapel of Saint Peter”, on the left side of the apse, contains a part of the table at which Peter the Apostle would have held the celebration of the Holy Eucharist in the house of Pudens. The rest of the table is embedded in the papal altar of Saint John Lateran. The sculpture on the altar depicts Christ delivering the keys of Heaven to St. Peter (1594) by the architect and sculptor Giacomo della Porta. In the same chapel there are two bronze slabs in the wall, explaining that here Peter was given hospitality and that Peter offered for the first time in Rome bread and wine as a consecration of the Eucharist. The pavement is ancient. A door opens into a cortile with a small chapel that contains frescoes from the 11th century. The famed wooden piece of the table belonging to the Pudente family is also preserved, purported to be used by Saint Peter himself during Holy Mass.
- Chapel of the Crucifix: contains a bronze crucifix by Achille Tamburini.
- Chapel of the Madonna of Mercy: contains the painting The Nativity of the Madonna by Lazarro Baldi
- Chapel of St. Bernard: contains a painting of Saint Benedict of Nursia and Saint Catherine of Siena
- Caetani chapel: This chapel for Caetani family (family of Pope Boniface VIII) was designed by Capriano da Volterra in 1588 and, after his death in 1601, completed by Carlo Maderno. The mosaics on the floor are notable. The columns of Lumachella marble. The relief (1599) above the altar is by Pier Paolo Olivieri and depicts Adoration of the Magi. Giovanni Paolo Rossetti painted St Praxedes and Pudenziana collecting the Blood of the Martyrs in 1621. He also painted the fresco of the Evangelist in the ceiling, to a design by Federico Zuccari.

The statue of Saint Pudentiana (c. 1650) in a niche is by Claude Adam. The sisters’ well stands just outside the Caetani chapel in the left aisle, which is said to contain the relics of 3,000 early martyrs, many of which were brought here and hidden by Pudentiana and Praxedes. This is marked by a square porphyry slab in the floor.

Following the decline of popular piety ushered by the ecclesiastical reforms of the Second Vatican Council in 1969, the names of Pudentiana and her sister Praxedes were removed from the General Roman Calendar.

== Titular church ==
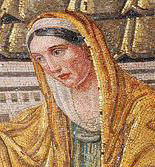
Detail of a mosaic depiction of Saint Pudentiana of the apse.

The shrine notably serves as a titular church of a cardinal. Pope Francis assigned this illustrious title to the Archbishop of Osaka, Cardinal Thomas Aquino Manyo Maeda on 28 June 2018.

One of the former Cardinal-Priests of this basilica was Cardinal Luciano Bonaparte, the great—nephew of the former Emperor of France, Napoleon Bonaparte.

=== List of Cardinal—Priests titled since 1278 ===
- Girolamo Masci, OFM (1278-1281)
- Robert de Pontigny, OCist. (1294-1305)
- Guillaume Arrufat (1306-1311)
- Raymond de Saint-Sever, OSB (1312-1317)
- Pierre Desprès (1320-1323)
- Renoul de Monteruc (1378-1382)
- Marino Giudice (c. 1383-1385)
  - Bertrand du Chanac (1385-1401), pseudocardinal of Antipope Clement VII
- Bartolomeo Oleario, OSB (1389-1396)
- Angelo d'Anna de Sommariva, OSBCam (1396-1412)
  - Otón de Moncada i de Luna (1440-1448), pseudocardinal of Antipope Felix V
- Guillaume Briçonnet (1495–1507)
- Pietro Isvalies (1507-1511)
- Matthäus Schiner (1511-1522)
- Gianvincenzo Carafa (1528–1537)
- Rodolfo Pio da Carpi (1537)
- Ascanio Parisani (1540-1549)
- Giovanni Angelo de' Medici (1549–1550) and (1552–1553)
- Scipione Rebiba (1556-1565)
- Francisco Pacheco de Toledo, vice deacon (1565)
- Gianfrancesco Gambara (1565-1570)
- Paolo Burali d'Arezzo, CR (1570–1578)
- Claude de La Baume (1580–1584)
- Enrico Caetani (1586-1599)
- Ascanio Colonna (1599–1606)
- Innocenzo Del Bufalo-Cancellieri (1606-1607)
- Bonifazio Caetani (1607-1617)
- Roberto Ubaldini (1617-1621)
- Antonio Caetani (iuniore) (1621-1624)
- Luigi Caetani (1626-1642)
- Alderano Cybo-Malaspina (1645-1668)
- Rinaldo d'Este (1668-1671)
- Gaspare Carpegna (1671-1672)
- Girolamo Gastaldi (1673-1677)
- Vacant (1677-1696)
- Federico Caccia (1696–1699)
- Giovanni Maria Gabrielli, OSB (1700–1711)
- Vacant (1711-1716)
- Ferdinando Nuzzi (1716-1717)
- Vacant (1717-1721)
- Carlos de Borja y Centellas (1721-1733)
- Giuseppe Spinelli (1735-1752)
- Antonino Sersale (1754-1775)
- Andrea Gioannetti, OSBCam (1778–1800)
- Lorenzo Litta (1801–1814)
- Vacant (1814-1818)
- Fabrizio Sceberras Testaferrata (1818-1843)
- Tommaso Pasquale Gizzi (1844-1849)
- Nicholas Patrick Stephen Wiseman (1850-1865)
- Lucien-Louis-Joseph-Napoleon Bonaparte (1868-1879)
- Domenico Sanguigni (1880-1882)
- Włodzimierz Czacki (1883-1888)
- Giuseppe Benedetto Dusmet, OSB (1889–1894)
- Victor-Lucien-Sulpice Lécot (1894-1908)
- Francis Alphonsus Bourne (1911-1935)
- Luigi Maglione (1936-1944)
- Jules-Géraud Saliège (1946-1956)
- Vacant (1956-1967)
- Alberto di Jorio (1967–1979)
- Vacant (1979-1983)
- Joachim Meisner (1983-2017)
- Thomas Aquino Manyo Maeda (2018-present)

== National affiliation with the Philippines ==
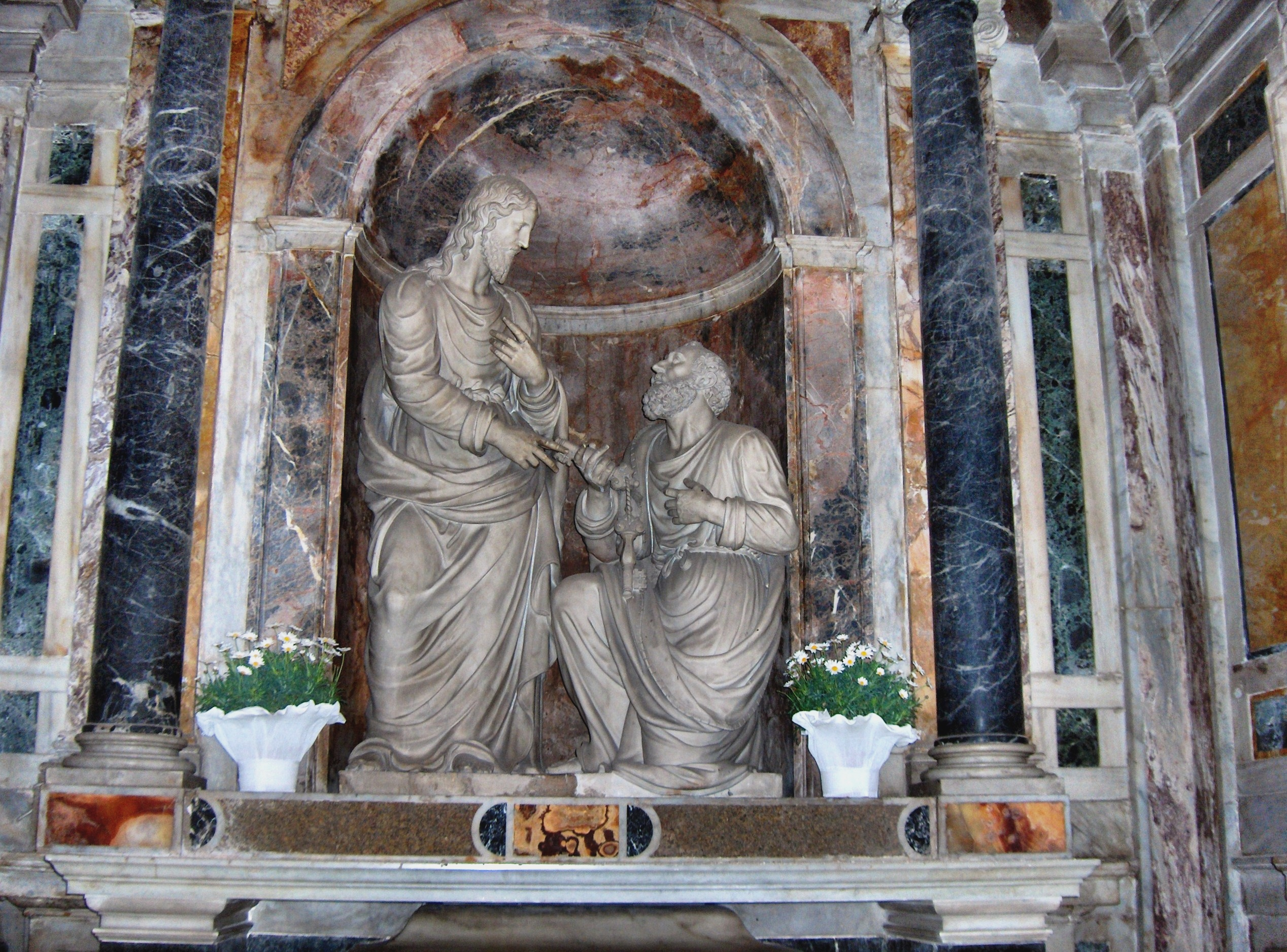
The Chapel of Saint Peter (1594). Sculpted by Giacomo della Porta

Pope John Paul II (expressed via the former President of Conference of Italian Bishops, Cardinal Camillo Ruini) gave a congratulatory homily to the Filipino peoples at this Basílica in 24 February 2002.

By Pontifical decree, Saint Potenciana at this shrine remains a secondary national patroness of the Philippines, in deference to the Blessed Virgin Mary who was accorded a higher title by the decree Impositi Nobis Apostolici by Pope Pius XII in 12 September 1942. Since the Jubilee year of 2000, an image of Filipino Saint Lawrence Ruiz of Manila was also permanently enshrined within the basilica.

== See also ==
- Filipinos in Italy
- Pontificio Collegio Filippino

Preceded by Santa Prassede	Landmarks of Rome; Santa Pudenziana	Succeeded by Santi Quattro Coronati
