= Casa Dipinta of Todi =

Coordinates: 42.783393°N 12.407007°E

The Casa Dipinta of Todi is a painted former vacation home of the artist Brian O'Doherty and his wife Barbara Novak located at Via delle Mura Antiche #25 at the intersection with Via Santa Prassede, in the historic center Todi, region of Umbria, Italy.

During a visit to the home of the sculptor Beverly Pepper in Todi, O'Doherty and Novak decided to purchase a vacation home in the town. They proceeded to decorate the plastered areas of the previously undistinguished 18th-century home in bright colors, often with primitive and sometimes whimsical trompe-l'œil windows. The artists detailed a more complex explanation for the program of works through the house, which is now on display as a museum.
