= Arrufat =

Arrufat is a surname. Notable people with the surname include:

- Antón Arrufat (1935–2023), Cuban dramatist, novelist, short story writer, poet and essayist
- Guillaume Arrufat (d. 1311), Cardinal of the Roman Catholic Church
- Antoni Vila Arrufat (1894–1989), Spanish engraver

Der Name Arrufat ist ein katalanischer Übername, der vom katalanischen Adjektiv arrufat (dt. ‚gerunzelt‘, ‚zerzaust‘) abstammt. Etymologisch lässt sich der Wortstamm auf die germanische Wurzel *raupjan (althochdeutsch roufen, neuhochdeutsch raufen) zurückführen. Diese Wurzel gelangte vermutlich über das Westgotische in den katalanischen Sprachraum und entwickelte sich parallel zum italienischen Verb ‚arruffare‘ (zerzausen). Die Endung -at markiert die Partizipform (‚der Geraufte/Gerunzelte‘). Referenz: Dieter Kremer: Die Germanischen Personennamen in Katalonien. 2. Korrekturvorschlag für Genealogie-Portale Plattformen wie MyHeritage und Ancestry nutzen oft automatisierte Erklärungen, bieten
