= Santa Prassede =

Basilica of Saint Praxedes
- Basilica di Santa Prassede all’Esquilino (Italian); Basilica Sanctae Praxedis (Latin)
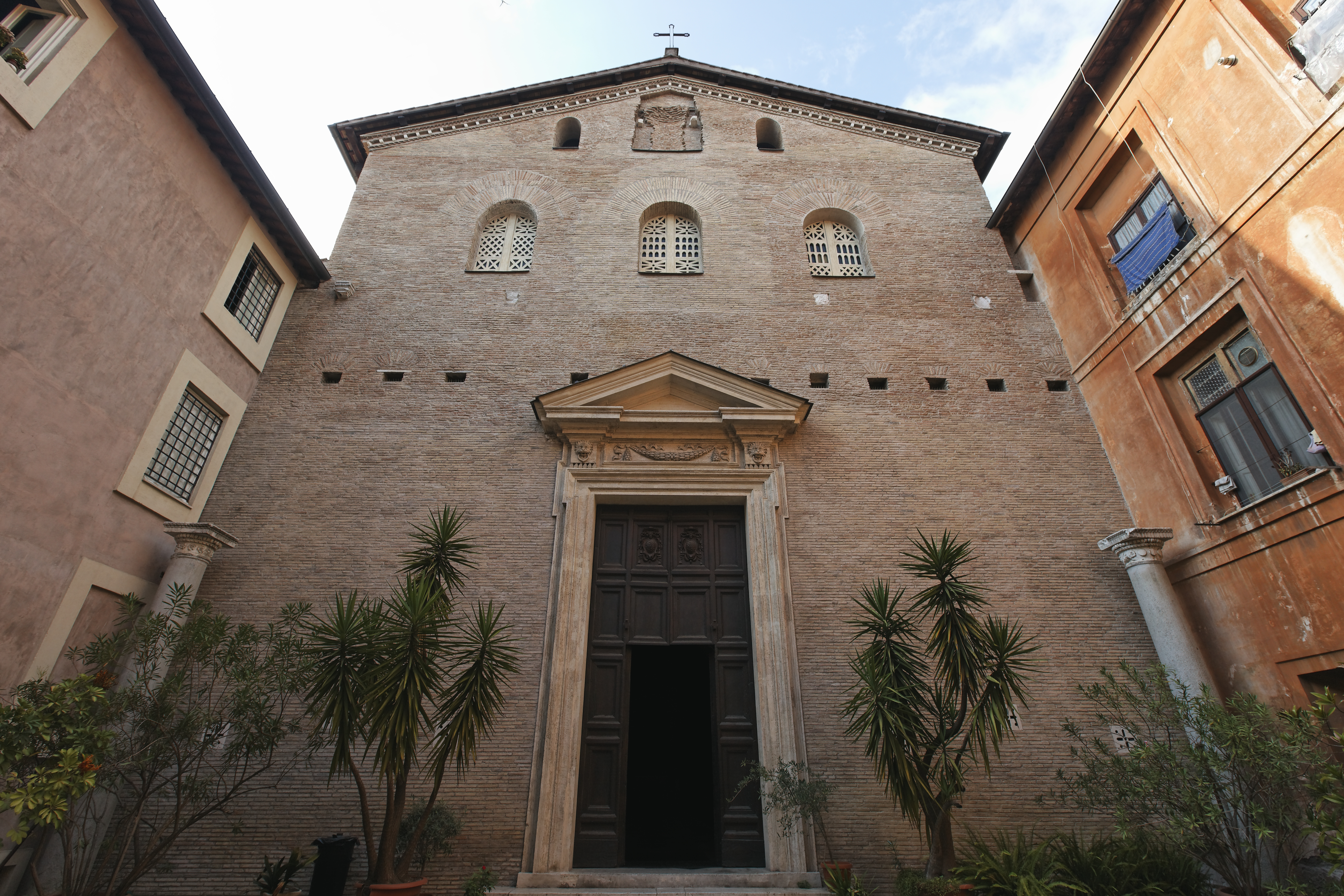
- Internal façade
- Click on the map for a fullscreen view
- 41°53′46″N 12°29′55″E
- Location: 9A Via di Santa Prassede; Rome
- Country: Italy
- Denomination: Catholic
- Tradition: Latin Church
- Religious order: Vallombrosian Benedictines
- Website: Chiesa Rettoria Santa Prassede

History
- Status: Minor basilica, titular church
- Dedication: Saint Praxedes: Saint Praxedes; Saint Pudentiana; Saint Zeno of Rome

Architecture
- Style: Byzantine
- Groundbreaking: 780
- Completed: 822

Specifications
- Length: 45 m (148 ft)
- Width: 30 m (98 ft)

The Basilica of Saint Praxedes (Latin: Basilica Sanctae Praxedis, Italian: Basilica di Santa Prassede all’Esquillino), commonly known in Italian as Santa Prassede, is an early medieval titular church and minor basilica located near the papal basilica of Saint Mary Major, on Via di Santa Prassede, rione Monti in Rome, Italy. The current Cardinal Priest of Titulus Sancta Praxedis is Paul Poupard.

The church is dedicated to the second-century Saint Praxedes, who with her sister Pudentiana, was said to have provided comfort and care to Christians persecuted in the Roman Empire. Since 1198 it has been served by Benedictine monks of the Vallombrosian order.

== History ==
The church incorporates mosaic decoration that mark it among the oldest churches in Rome. The Titulus S. Praxedis was established by Pope St. Evaristus in c. 112 and church near this site was present since at least the fifth century. The church in its current place and general layout was commissioned by Pope Hadrian I around the year 780 to house the relics (bones) of St. Praxedes (Italian: S. Prassede) and St. Pudentiana (Italian: S. Pudenziana), the daughters of St. Pudens, traditionally St. Peter's first Christian convert in Rome. The church was built atop of the remains of a 4th-century ancient Roman Thermae, privately owned by the family of Pudentiana, and called Terme di Novato. The two female saints were murdered for providing Christian burial for early martyrs in defiance of Roman law. The basilica was enlarged and decorated by Pope St. Paschal I in c. 828.

Paschal, who reigned 817–824, was at the forefront of the Carolingian Renaissance started and advocated by the emperor Charlemagne. They desired to get back to the foundations of Christianity theologically and artistically. Paschal, thus, began two, linked, ambitious programs: the recovery of martyrs' bones from the catacombs of Rome and an almost unprecedented church building campaign. Paschal dug up numerous skeletons and transplanted them to this church. While on a pilgrimage to Rome with his father around 855-856, the young and future English king Alfred the Great was reportedly deeply impressed and inspired by the church's beauty.

In 1198 the Vallumbrosian monks, an Italian reform movement in the Benedictine Order inspired by Saint John Gualbert, were granted the monastery attached to the basilica by Pope Innocent III and have been present without interruption for more than 800 years since. They still maintain the monastery and the church and minister its liturgy today.

The inscriptions found in Santa Prassede, a valuable source illustrating the history of the church, have been collected and published by Vincenzo Forcella.

The church contains the oratory of St. Zeno.

The church provided the inspiration for Robert Browning's poem "The Bishop Orders His Tomb at Saint Praxed's Church."

== Interior ==
=== Frescos, Paintings, & Carvings ===
The main altarpiece is a canvas of St Praxedes Gathering the Blood of the Martyrs (c. 1730–35) by Domenico Muratori. On the right column of the triumphal arch, above the plaque, there is the Portrait of Cardinal Angelo Maria Querini (1747) by Jacopo Zoboli. It also contains an Annunciation by Stefano Pieri.

=== Mosaics ===
Interior of Santa Prassede

The most famous element of the church is the mosaic decorative program. Paschal hired a team of professional mosaicists to complete the work in the apse, the apsidal arch, and the triumphal arch. In the apse, Jesus is in the center, flanked by Sts. Peter and Paul who present Prassede and Pudenziana to God. On the far left is Paschal, with the square halo of the living, presenting a model of the church as an offering to Jesus. Below runs an inscription of Paschal's, hoping that this offering will be sufficient to secure his place in heaven.

On the apsidal arch are twelve men on each side, holding wreaths of victory, welcoming the souls into heaven. Above them are symbols of the four Gospel writers: Mark, the lion; Matthew, the man; Luke, the bull; and John, the eagle, as they surround a lamb on a throne, a symbol of Christ's eventual return to Earth.

External videos
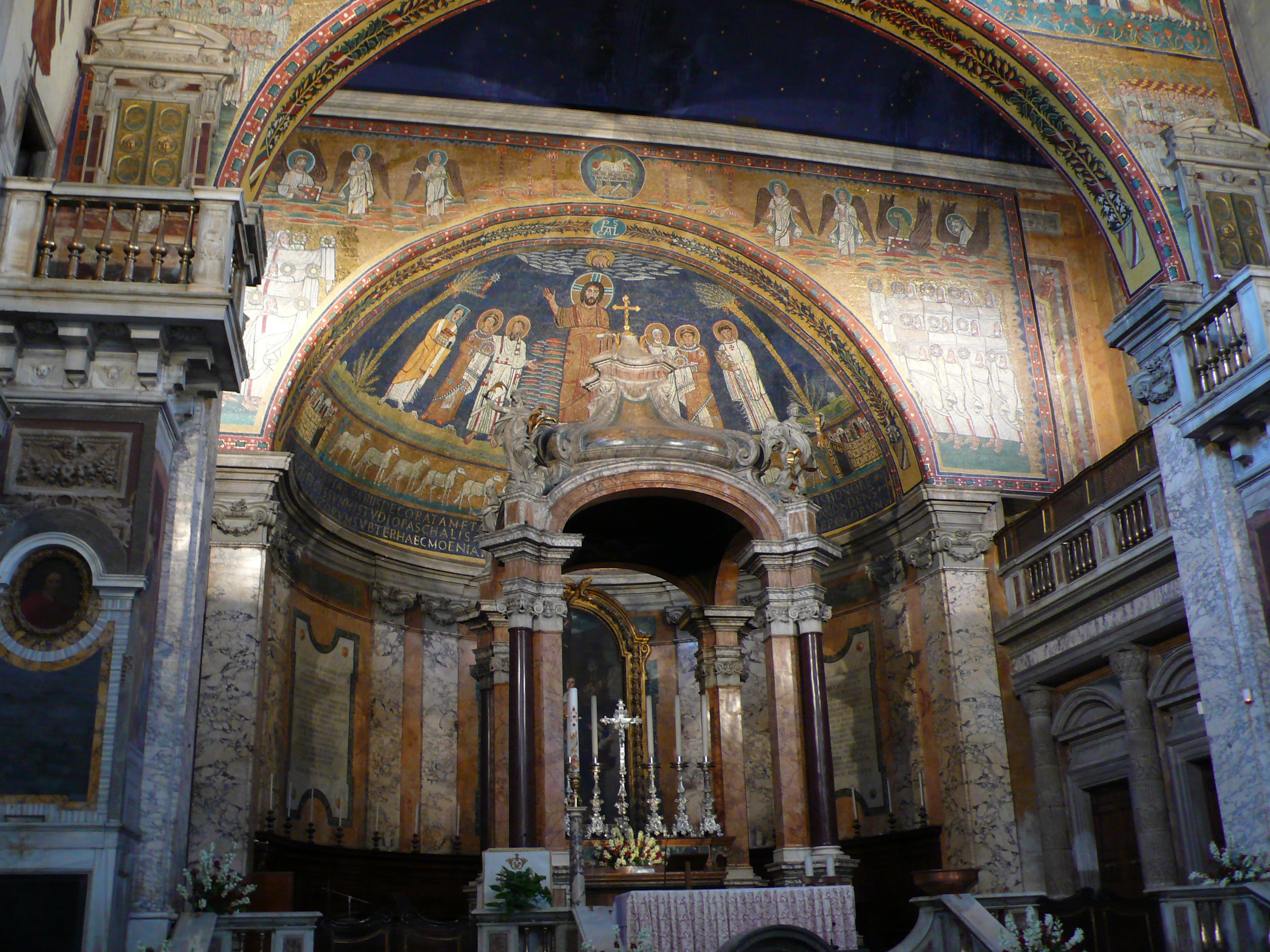
- Santa Prassede (Praxedes), Smarthistory

Those mosaics, as well as those in the Chapel of Saint Zeno, a funerary chapel which Pope Paschal built for his mother, Theodora, are the best-known aspects of the church.

=== Column of the Flagellation ===
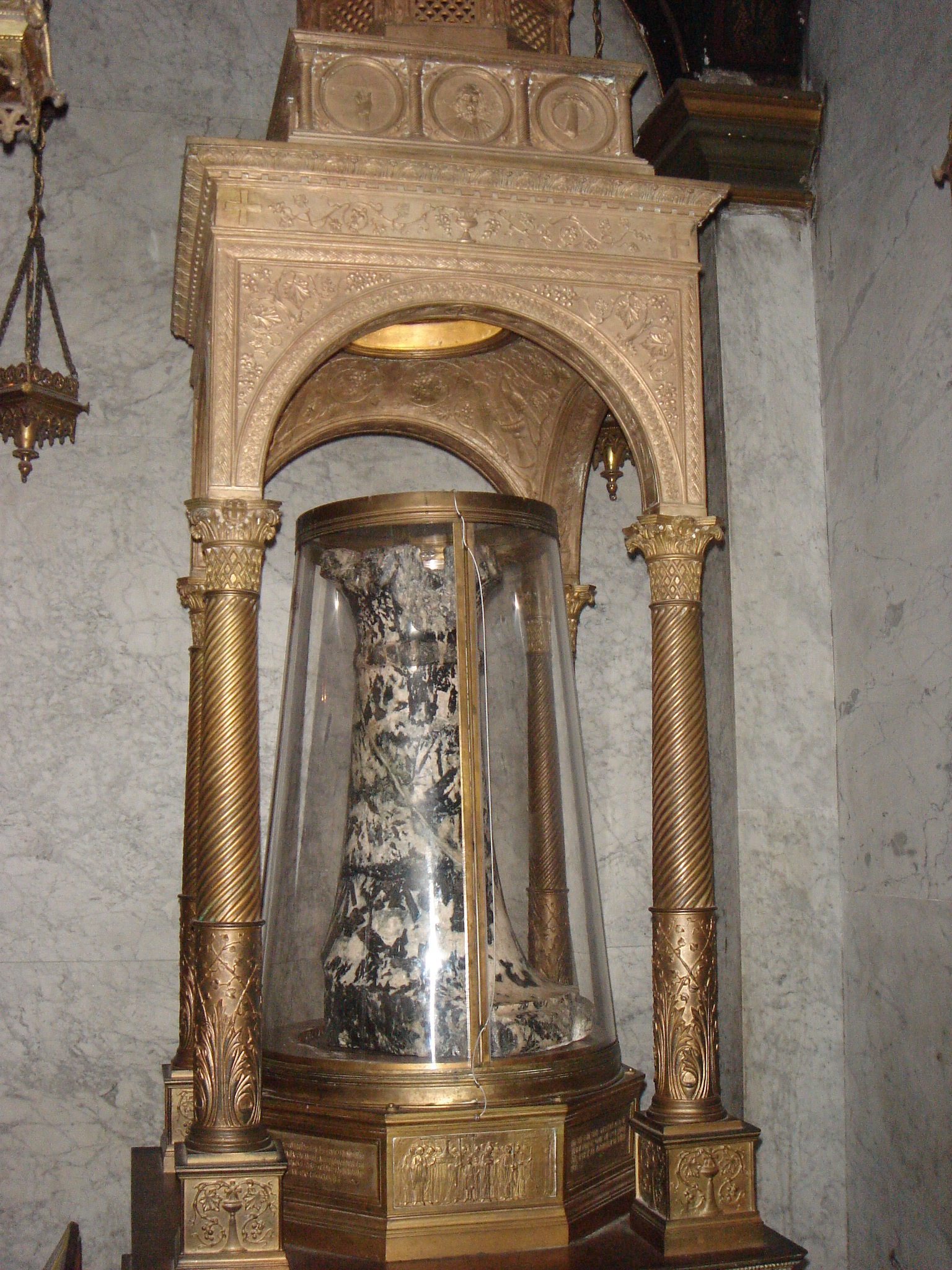
The Column of the Flagellation.

Santa Prassede also houses an alleged segment of the pillar or column upon which Jesus was flogged before his crucifixion in Jerusalem (see Flagellation of Christ). The relic is alleged to have been discovered in the early 4th century by Saint Helena (mother of the Roman Emperor Constantine I) who at the age of 80 undertook a pilgrimage to the Holy Land, where she founded churches for Christian worship and rescued relics associated with the crucifixion of Jesus on Calvary. In 1223, Cardinal Giovanni Colonna, as emissary to the holy land in 1223 was said to have obtained this artifact and brought it to Rome.

Among these legendary relics retrieved by Helena, which included pieces of the True Cross (now venerated at St. Peter's Basilica with fragments in Santa Croce in Gerusalemme, also in Rome) and wood from the Jesus' crib enshrined at S. Maria Maggiore. These items, including the Santa Prassede pillar, lack indisputable authenticity, due to absence of forensic evidence and the abundance of other objects claimed during the medieval period to have the same historic function.

== List of cardinals ==
- Benedict, under Pope Gregory VII (1073–1085)
- Deodatus (1091), appointee of Antipope Clement III
- Romanus (1105–1112)
- Lambert (1112–1115)
- Desiderius (1115–1138)
- Chrysogonus (1138–1141)
- Hubald of Lucca (1141–1158)
- William (1173)
- Radulfus Nigellus (1188)
- Rufinus (1190–1192)
- Soffred of Pistoia (1193–1210)
- Giovanni da Ferentino (1212–1217)
- Giovanni Colonna di Carbognano (1217–1245)
- Ancher Pantaleon (1262–1286)
- Bernard de Languissel (1286–1291?)
- Regnaud de La Porte (1321–1325)
- Pedro Gómez de Barroso (1327–1341)
- Gilles Rigaud (1350–1353)
- Marco da Viterbo (1366–1369)
- Pedro Gómez de Barroso Albornoz (1371–1374)
- Pietro Pileo di Prata (1378–1384)
  - Tommaso Ammanati (1385–1396), loyal to the Avignon Papacy
  - Pedro Fernández de Frías (1405–1412), loyal to the Avignon and Pisa papacies
- Antonio Calvi (1405–1409)
- Raimond Mairose (1426–1427)
- Jean Le Jeune (1440–1441)
- Alain de Coëtivy (1448–1465); in commendam (1465–1474)
- Giovanni Arcimboldo (1476–1488)
- Antoniotto Pallavicini (1489–1503)
- Gabriele de' Gabrielli (1507–1511)
- Christopher Bainbridge (1511–1514)
- Antonio Maria Ciocchi del Monte (1514–1521)
- Ippolito de' Medici (1529–1532)
- Tommaso De Vio (1534)
- Francesco Cornaro (1535–1541)
- Philippe de la Chambre (1541–1542)
- Gasparo Contarini (1542)
- Giovanni Maria Ciocchi del Monte (1542–1543)
- Miguel da Silva (1543–1552)
- Cristoforo Guidalotti Ciocchi del Monte (1552–1564)
- Charles Borromeo (1564–1584)
- Nicolas de Pellevé (1584–1594)
- Alessandro Ottaviano de' Medici (1594–1600)
- Simeone Tagliavia d'Aragona (1600)
- Antonio Maria Galli (1600–1605)
- Ottavio Acquaviva d'Aragona (1605–1612)
- Bartolomeo Cesi (1613–1620)
- Roberto Bellarmino (1620–1621)
- François d'Escoubleau de Sourdis (1621–1628)
- Marcello Lante (1628–1629)
- Roberto Ubaldini (1629–1635)
- Guido Bentivoglio (1635–1639)
- Giulio Roma (1639–1644)
- Ernst Adalbert von Harrach (1644–1667)
- Giulio Gabrielli (1667)
- Virginio Orsini (1667–1668)
- Alderano Cybo-Malaspina (1668–1677)
- Pietro Vito Ottoboni (1680–1681)
- Francesco Albizzi (1681–1684)
- Decio Azzolino (1684–1689)
- Giulio Spinola (1689–1691)
- Francesco Maidalchini (1691–1700)
- Galeazzo Marescotti (1700–1708)
- Fabrizio Spada (1708–1710)
- Bandino Panciatichi (1710–1718)
- Francesco Barberini, Jr. (1718–1721)
- Giuseppe Sacripante (1721–1726)
- Filippo Antonio Gualterio (1726–1728)
- Lodovico Pico della Mirandola (1728–1731)
- Antonio Felice Zondadari (1731–1737)
- Giorgio Spinola (1737–1738)
- Luis Belluga y Moncada (1738–1743)
- Angelo Maria Quirini OSBCas (1743–1755)
- Domenico Silvio Passionei (1755–1759)
- Giacomo Oddi (1759–1763)
- Carlo Vittorio Amedeo delle Lanze (1763–1783)
- Vitaliano Borromeo (1783–1793)
- Francesco Saverio de Zelada (1793–1801)
- Antonio Dugnani (1801–1807)
- Carlo Antonio Giuseppe Bellisomi (1807–1808)
- vacant (1808–1814)
- Giovanni Filippo Gallarati Scotti (1814–1818); in commendam (1818–1819)
- vacant (1819–1823)
- Francesco Serlupi Crescenzi (1823–1828)
- Antonio Domenico Gamberini (1829–1839); in commendam (1839–1841)
- Paolo Polidori (1841–1847)
- Luigi Vannicelli Casoni (1847–1877)
- Edoardo Borromeo (1878–1881)
- Angelo Bianchi (1883–1889)
- Tommaso Maria Zigliara (1891–1893)
- Gaetano Aloisi Masella (1893–1902)
- Rafael Merry del Val y Zulueta (1903–1930)
- Raffaele Carlo Rossi (1930–1948)
- vacant (1948–1953)
- Pietro Ciriaci (1953–1964)
- Owen McCann (1965–1994)
- Paul Poupard (since 1996)

== Gallery ==
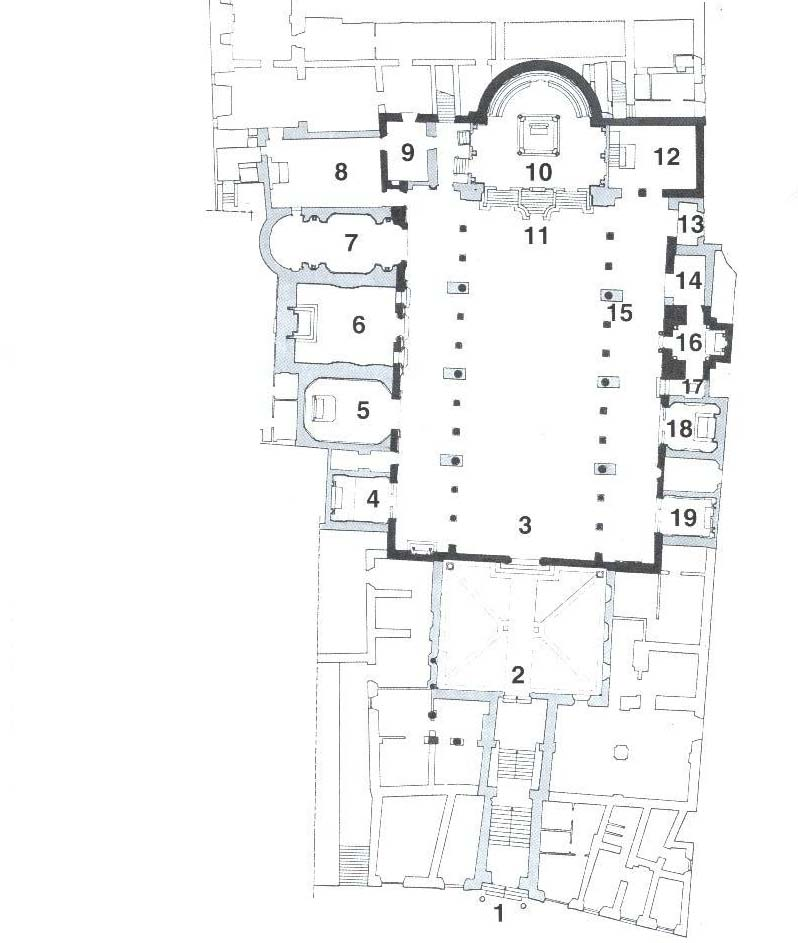
Plan: (1) Prothyrum, (2) Atrium, (3) Nave, (4) St. Peter’s Chapel, (5) St. Charles Borromeo Chapel, (6) Olgiati Chapel, (7) Chapel of the Blessed Sacrament & St. Benedict, (8) Sacristy, (9) Bell Tower, (10) Sanctuary & Monastic Choir, (11) Crypt Entrance, (12) Chapel of the Crucifix of St. Brigid of Sweden, (13) Side Door, (14) Tomb of Cardinal Alano, (15) Tomb of Msgr. Santoni by Bernini, (16) St. Zeno’s Chapel, (17) Sanctuary of the Column of the Lords Flagellation, (18) St. Pius X Chapel, (19) St. Bernardo Uberti Chapel.

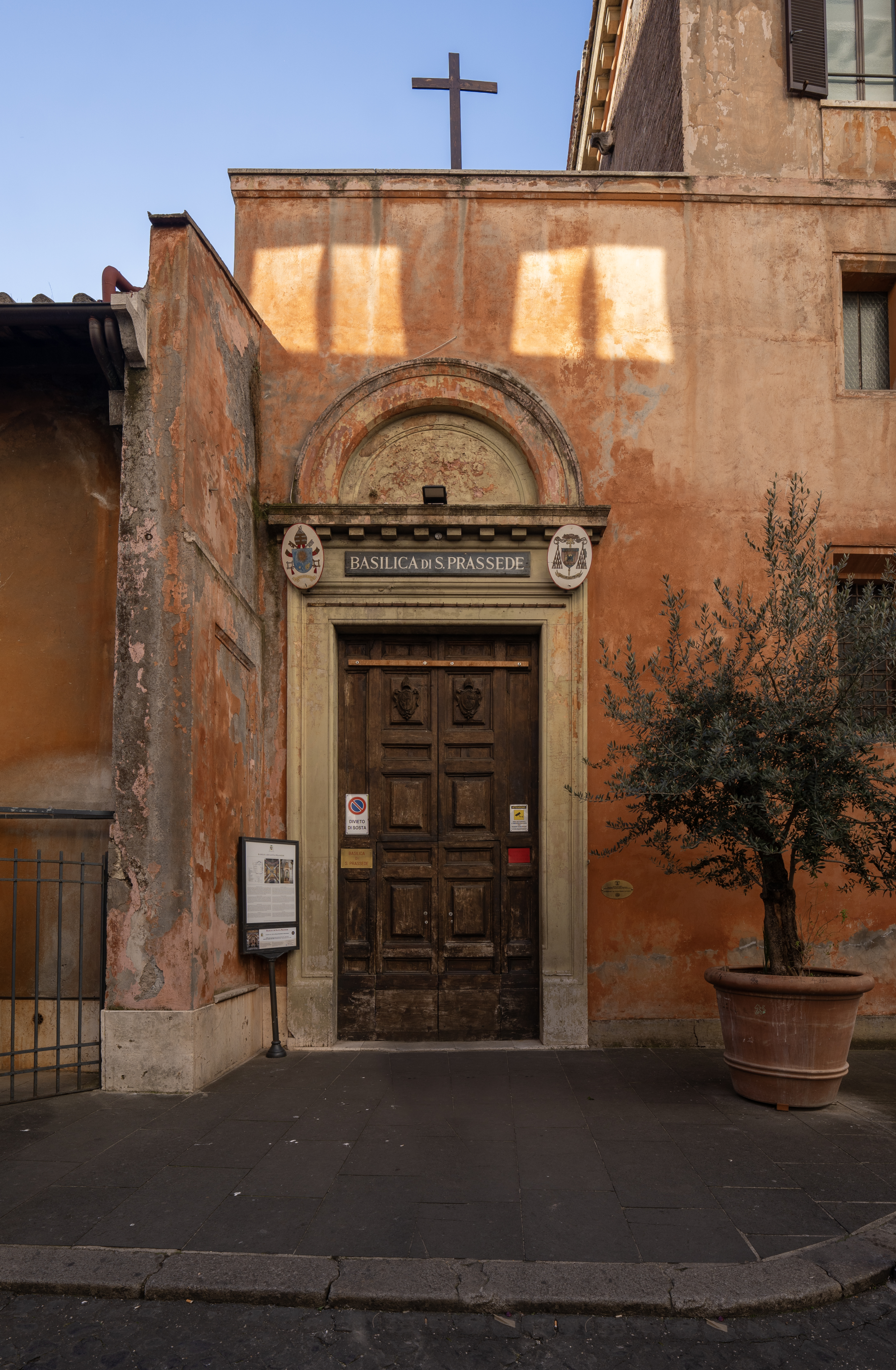
Side entrance

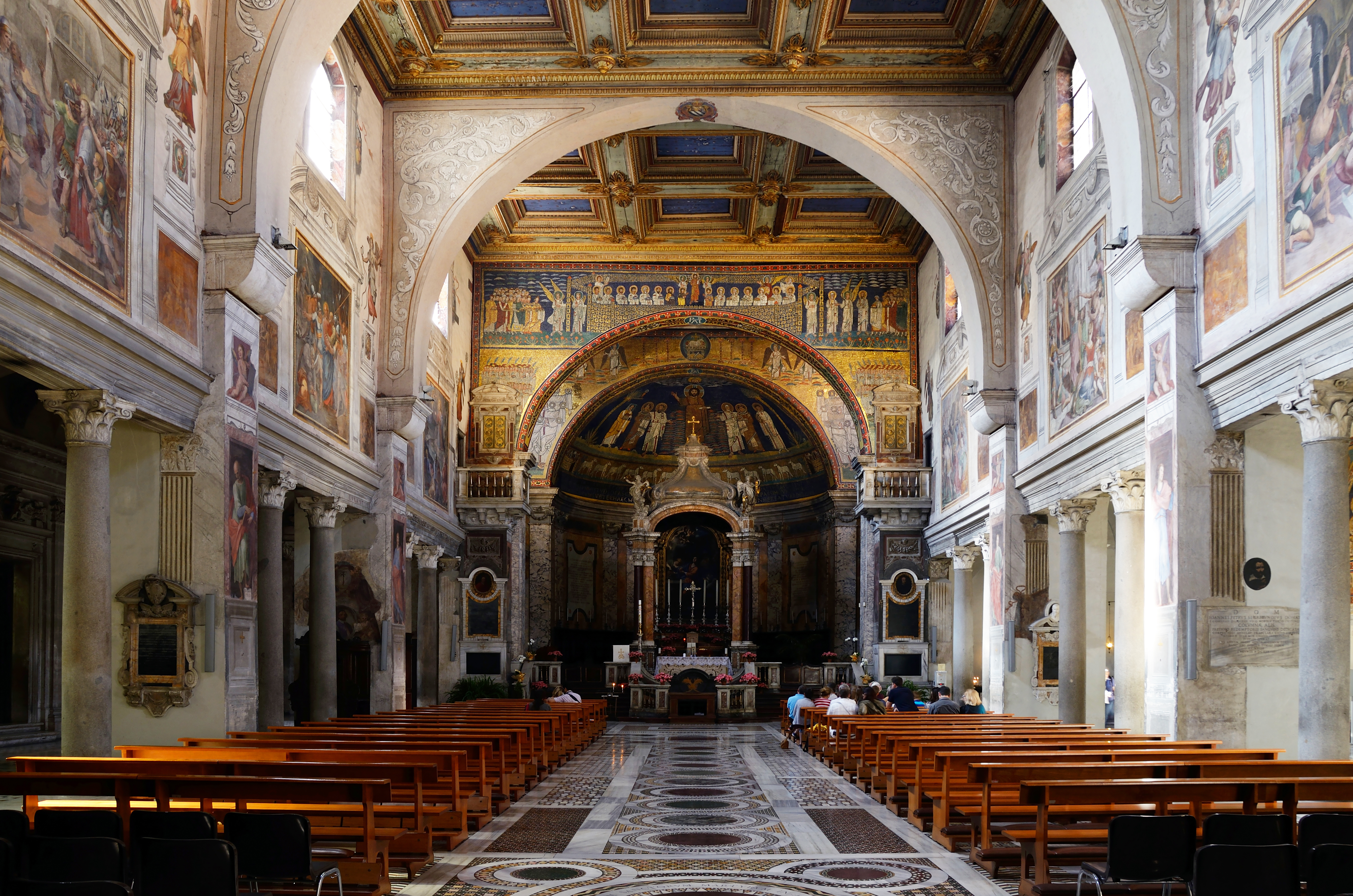
Interior

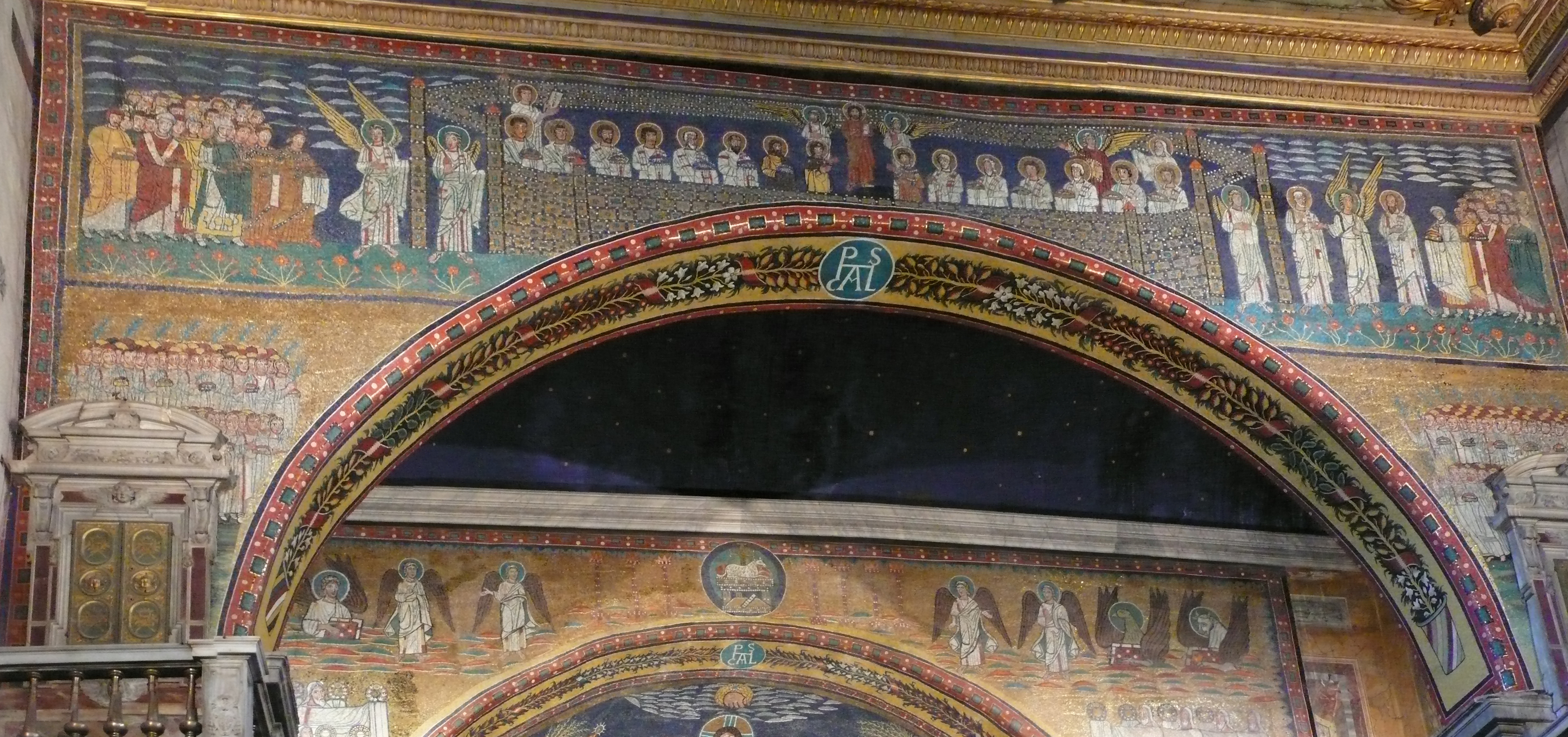
Triumphal arch mosaic

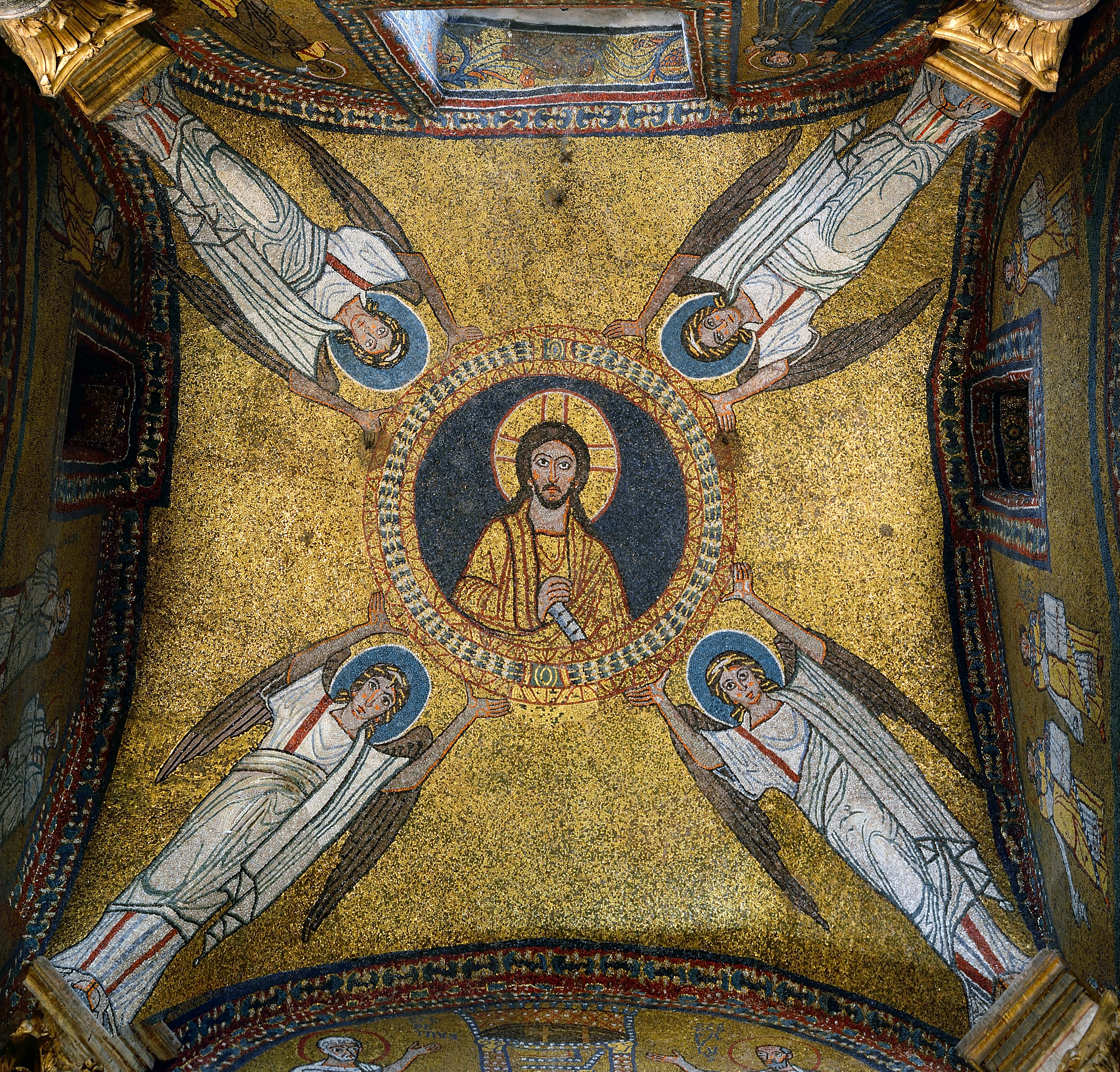
Ceiling of the Chapel of Saint Zeno

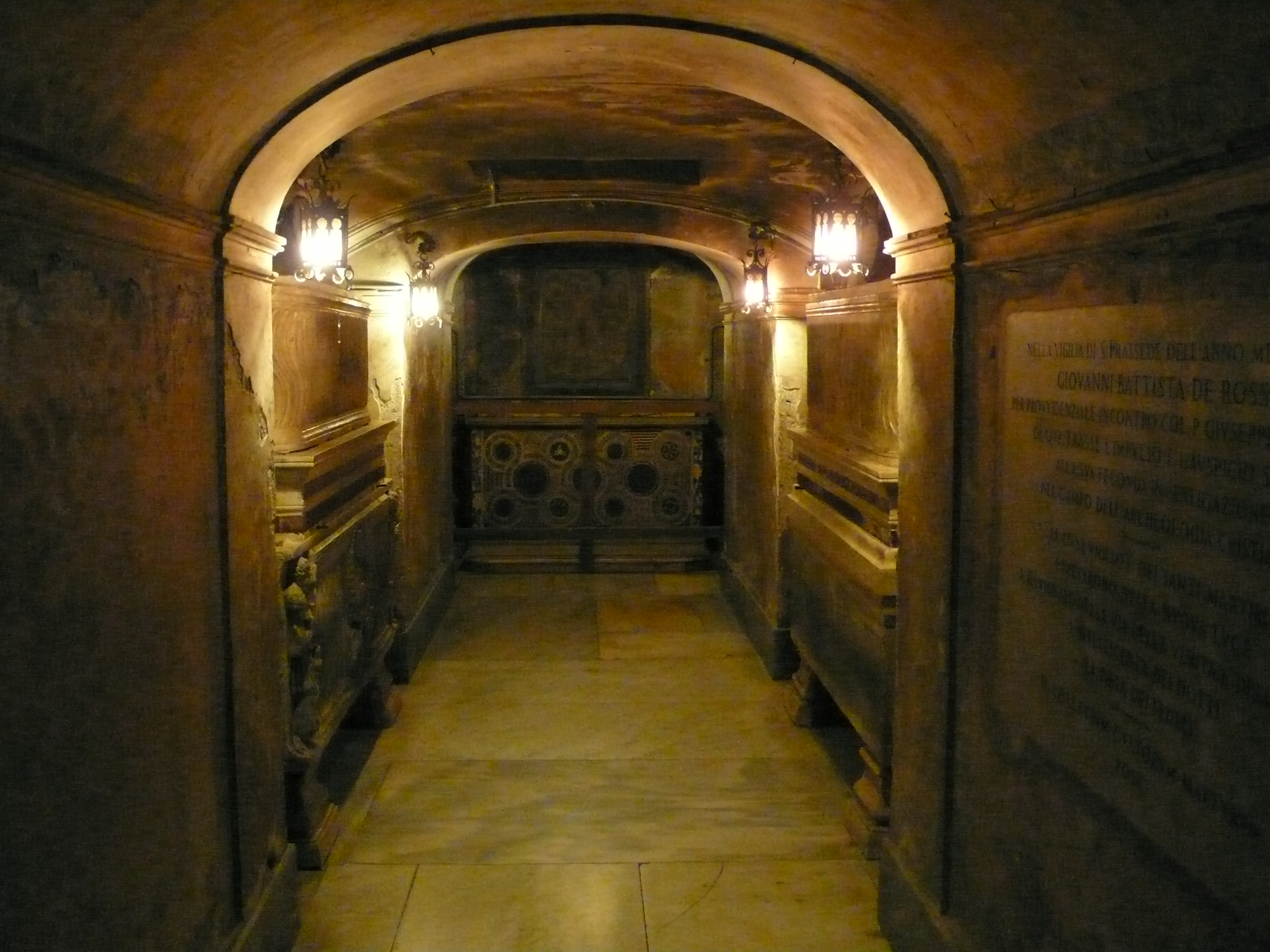
Crypt

.

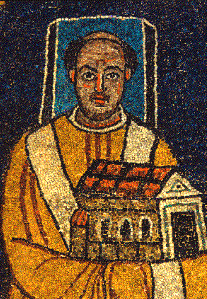
Pope Paschal I presenting a model of the Basilica to Christ. His square halo indicates that he was alive when the mosaic was made.

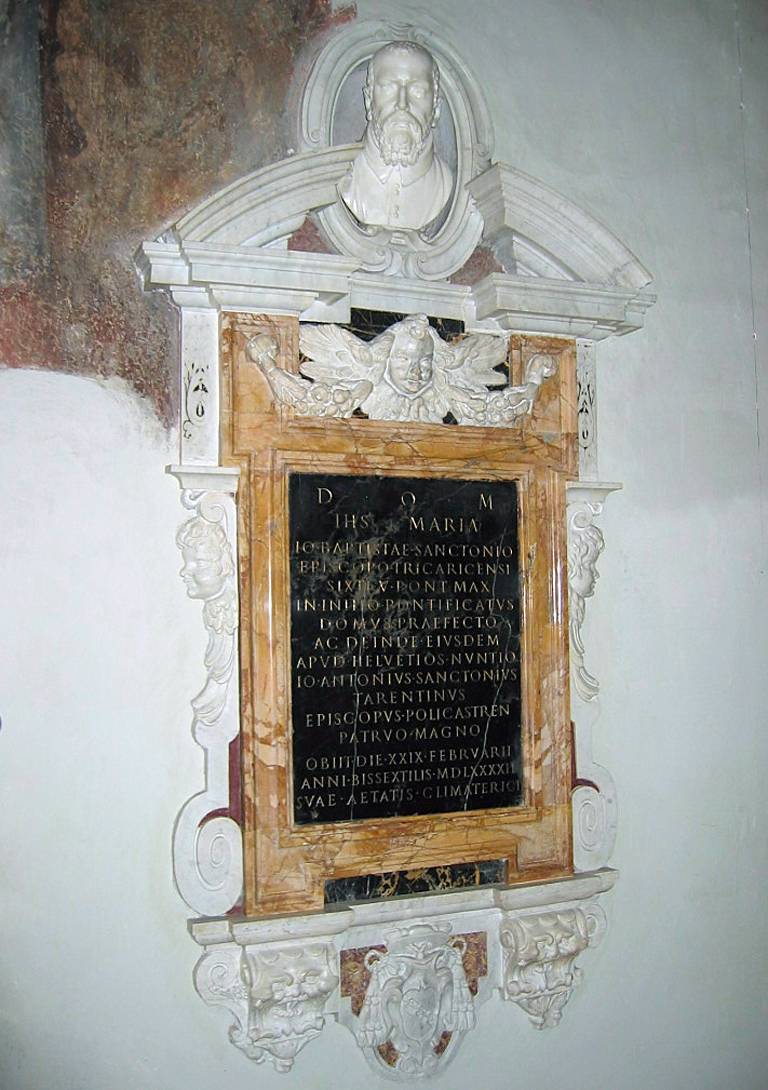
Funerary monument of Bishop Giovanni Battista Santoni († 1592); bust by Giovanni Lorenzo Bernini, circa 1612.

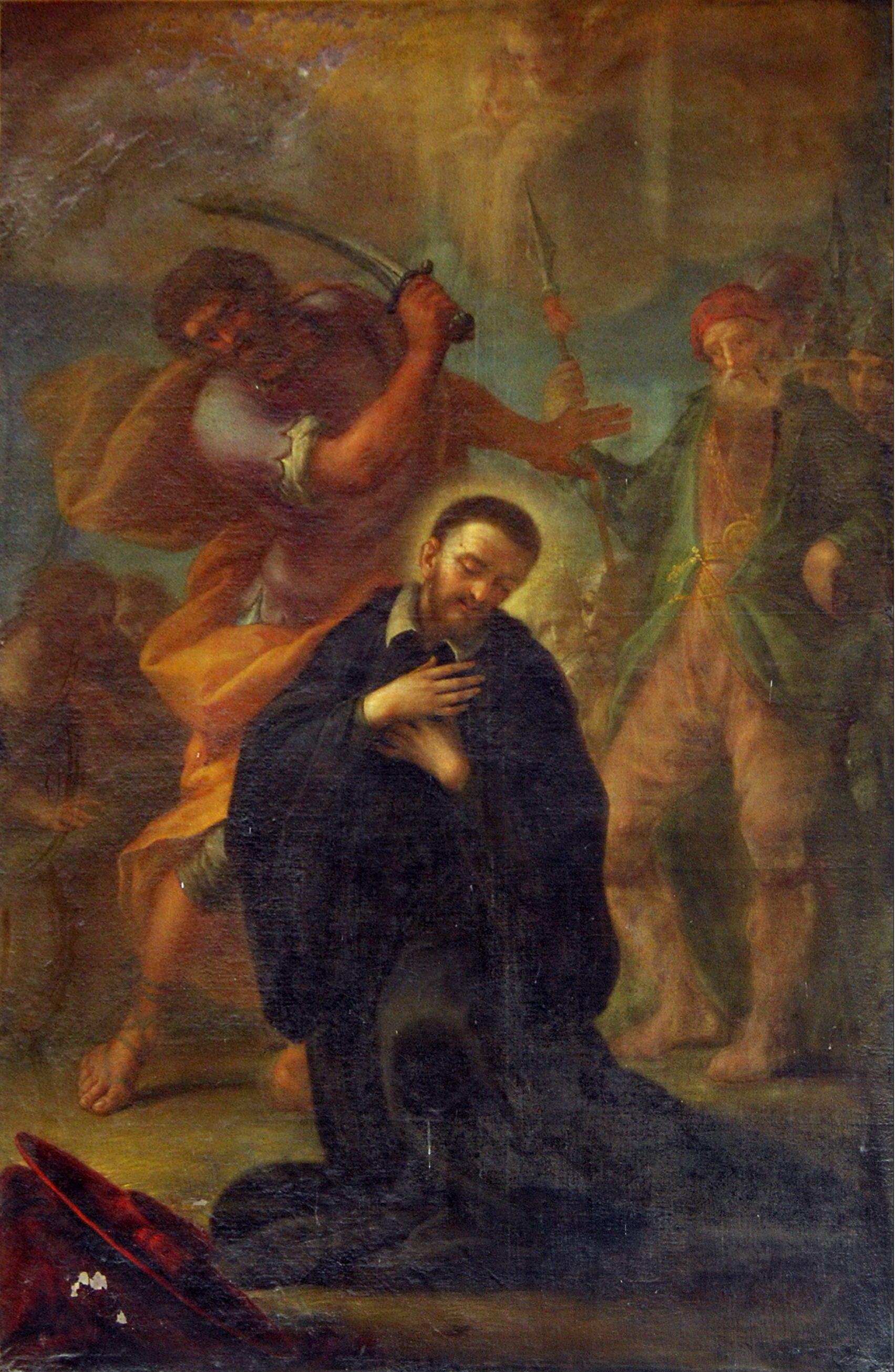
"San Tesauro Beccaria" by Domenico Pestrini

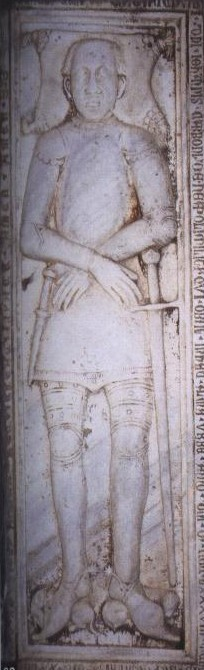
Tomb of Giovanni Carbone, 14th century

== See also ==
- Episcopa Theodora

== Bibliography ==
- B. M. Apollonj Ghetti, Santa Prassede (Roma: Edizioni Roma, 1961).
- Gillian Vallance Mackie, The Iconographic Programme of the Zeno Chapel at Santa Prassede, Rome [M.A. University of Victoria (B.C., Canada) 1985].
- Marchita B. Mauck, “The Mosaic of the Triumphal Arch of Santa Prassede: A Liturgical Interpretation.” Speculum 62–64 (1987), pp. 813–828.
- Rotraut Wisskirchen, Mosaikprogramm von Santa Prassede in Rom (Münster: Aschendorff, 1990).
- Anna Maria Affanni, La chiesa di Santa Prassede: la storia, il rilievo, il restauro (Viterbo: BetaGamma, [2006]) [Testimonianze di restauri, 5].
- Mary M. Schaefer, Women in Pastoral Office: The Story of Santa Prassede, Rome (New York, NY: Oxford University Press, 2013).
- Maurizio Caperna, La basilica di Santa Prassede: il significato della vicenda architettonica (Roma: Edizioni Quasar, 2013).
- Benedictine Monks of Vallombroso, The Basilica of Saint Praxedes, in memory of their eighth century of presence at Saint Praxedes: 1198–1998 (Genova, Italia: B.N. Marconi, Fourth Edition, January 2014).

Preceded by San Pietro in Vincoli	Landmarks of Rome; Santa Prassede	Succeeded by Santa Pudenziana
