= Praxedes =

Second century Christian saint

Saint Praxedes
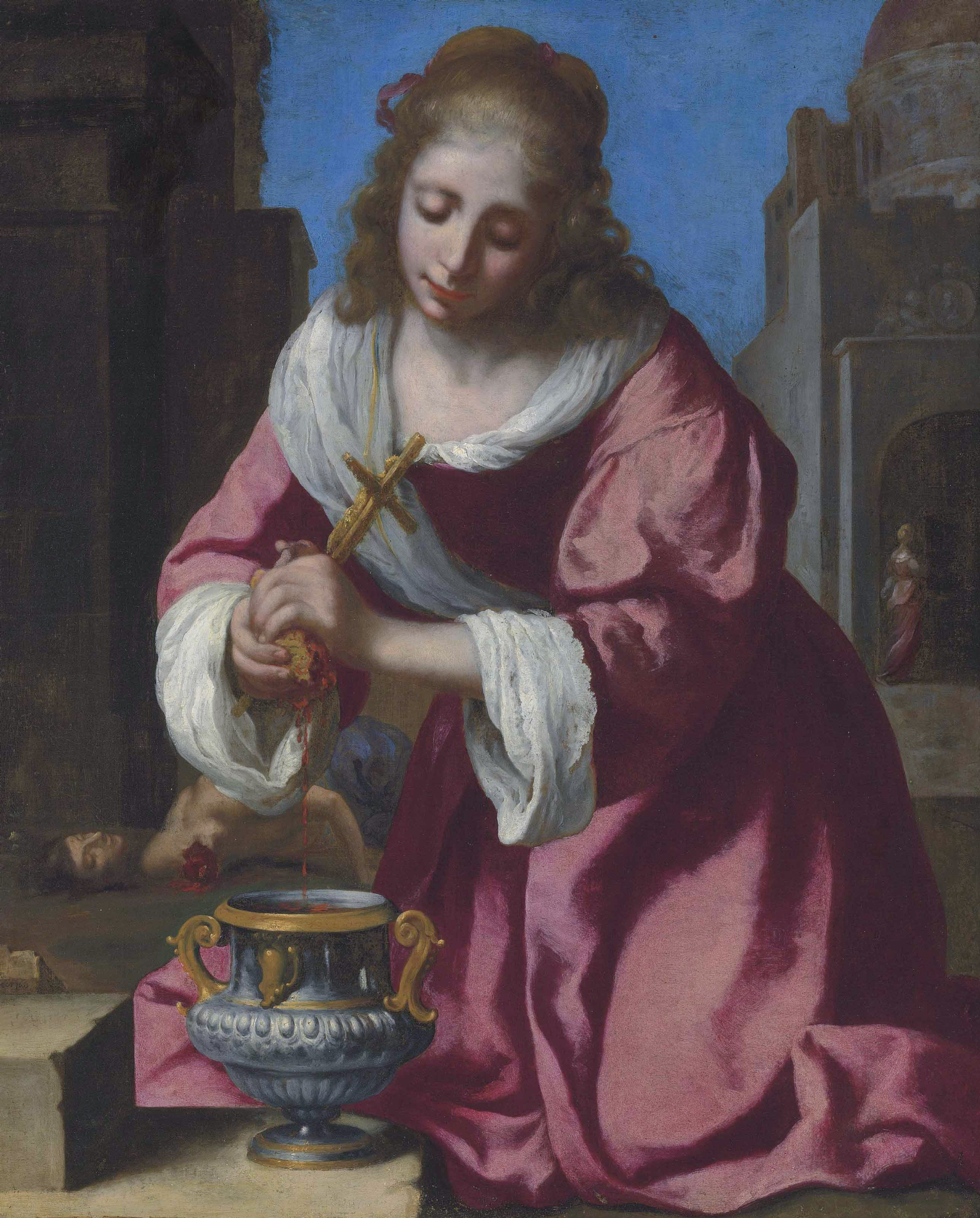
- Saint Praxedis. Johannes Vermeer (ca. 1655).

Virgin
- Died: 165
- Venerated in: Roman Catholic Church; Eastern Orthodox Church
- Canonized: Pre-congregation
- Major shrine: Basilica of Santa Prassede, Rome
- Feast: 21 July
- Attributes: crown, vessel, sponge

Praxedes (died 165), called "a Roman maiden", was a saint and virgin who lived in the Roman Empire during the 2nd century. Along with her sister, Pudentiana, she provided for the poor and gave care and comfort to persecuted Christians and martyrs. Her veneration began in the 4th century and many churches have been dedicated to her.

== Biography ==
Praxedes's father was Pudens, a Roman senator who was a Christian convert of Peter, mentioned in the New Testament by Paul in 2 Timothy 4:21. She was the sister of Pudentiana. Sabine Baring-Gould, in the entry for Saint Novatus, states that Praxedes's brothers were Novatus and Timothy.

After her father's conversion to Christianity, Praxedes's entire family became Christians and she and her sister eventually inherited their family's fortune, which they used to provide for the poor. During a period of persecution in the Roman Empire in the early years of the Christian Church, Praxedes and Pudentiana buried the bodies of Christians and distributed goods to the poor. They cared for, encouraged, financially supported, and comforted Christians, hid many in Praxedes's home, ministered to them in prison, and buried martyrs. Praxedes also "allowed those who were in prison or toiling in slavery to lack nothing".

Praxedes and Pudentiana died in 165, when Praxedes was 16 years old. The Catholic Encyclopedia calls both sisters "martyrs of an unknown era" and states that they were venerated as martyrs in Rome starting during the 4th century. They, along with their father, were buried in the Catacomb of Priscilla, the archaeological site near the Via Salaria located on the Rione Esquilino, which was used for Christian burials from the late 2nd century through the 4th century. They are also mentioned in the 7th-century itineraries of the graves of Roman martyrs buried there. The feast day of Saint Praxedes is July 21.

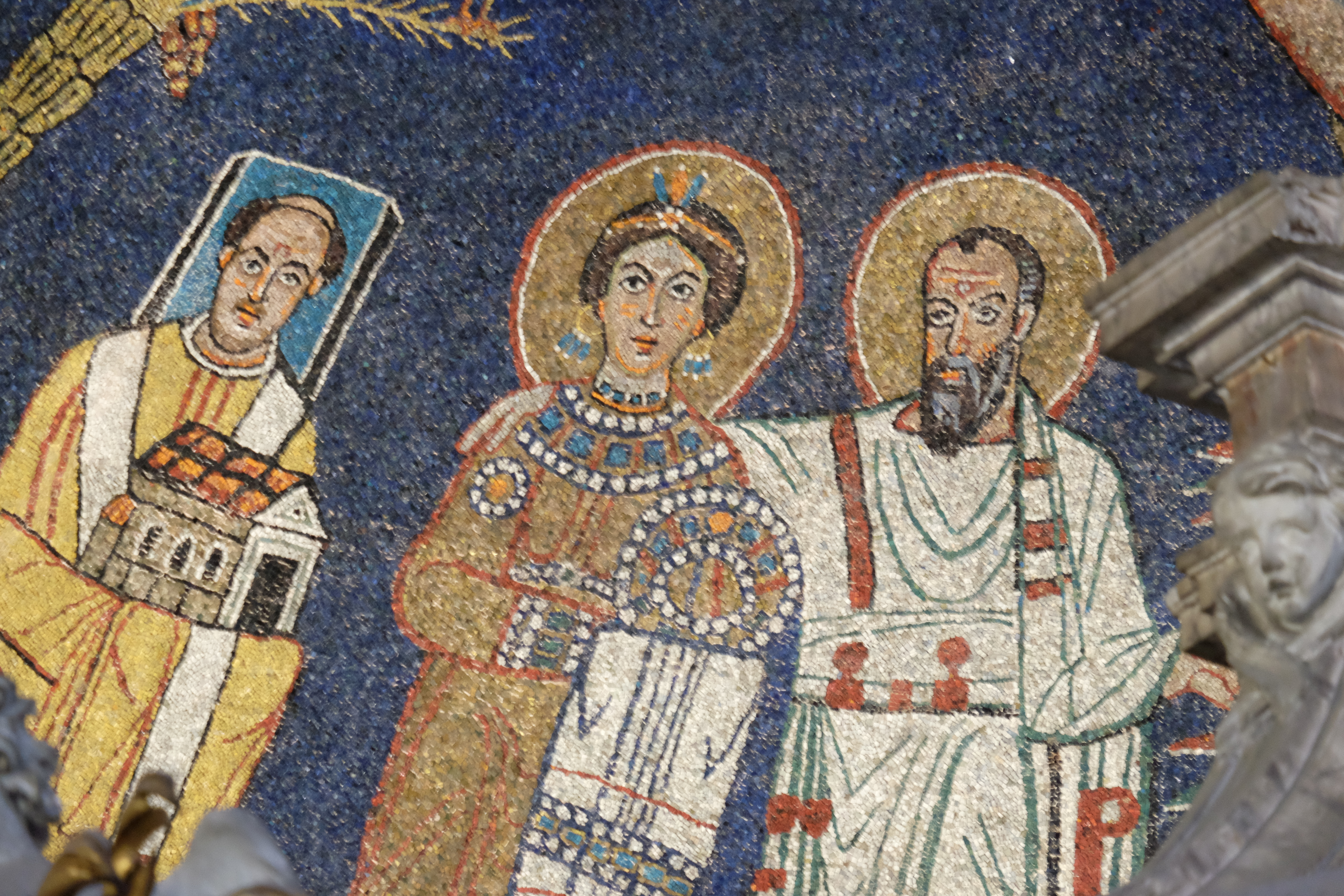
Mosaic from Santa Prassede

Art historian Margaret E. Tabor states that the churches dedicated to both Praxedes and Pudentiana are among the most well-known and interesting churches in Rome. They are probably the two female figures shown offering their crowns to Christ in the mosaic of the apse in the Basilica of Saint Praxedes, built in the 4th century on the site of Praxedes's home and rebuilt by Pope Paschal I (817–824), who translated the sisters' relics there. Praxedes is depicted in images at the basilica "squeezing the blood of the martyrs which she has collected from a sponge into a vessel". A part of the floor in the basilica's central nave is marked as the place where the sisters' relics are stored.

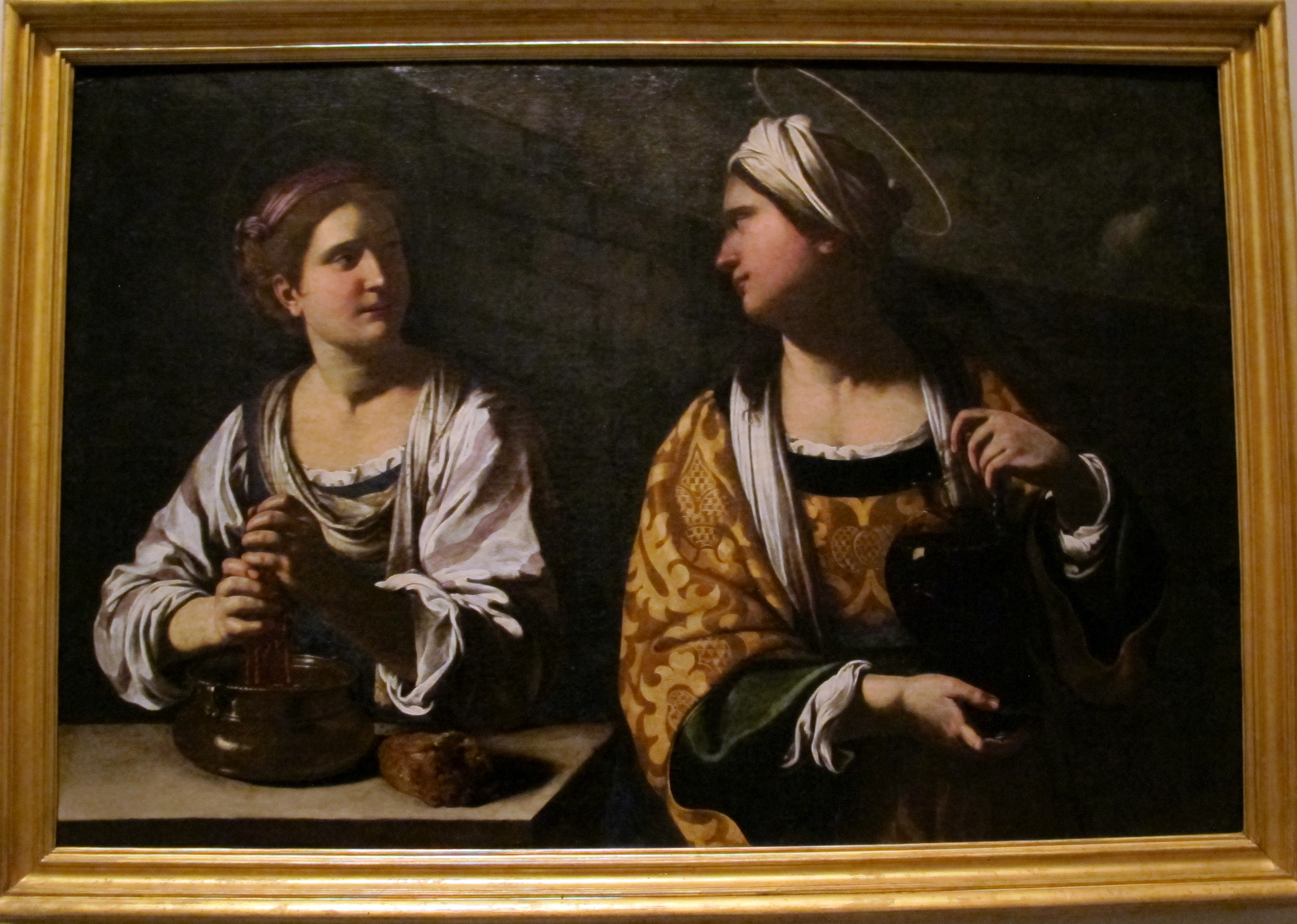
Saints Praxedis and Pudenziana by Antiveduto Grammatica

=== Churches dedicated to Saint Praxedis ===
- Santa Prassede church in Rome
- Santa Prassede, Todi
- Santa Praxedes, Cagayan
- Sainte-Praxède, Quebec

== Works cited ==
Tabor, Margaret E. (1913). The Saints in Art (2nd ed.). New York: E. P. Dutton and Company.
