= Novatus =

Christian saint (died c.151)

Saint Novatus
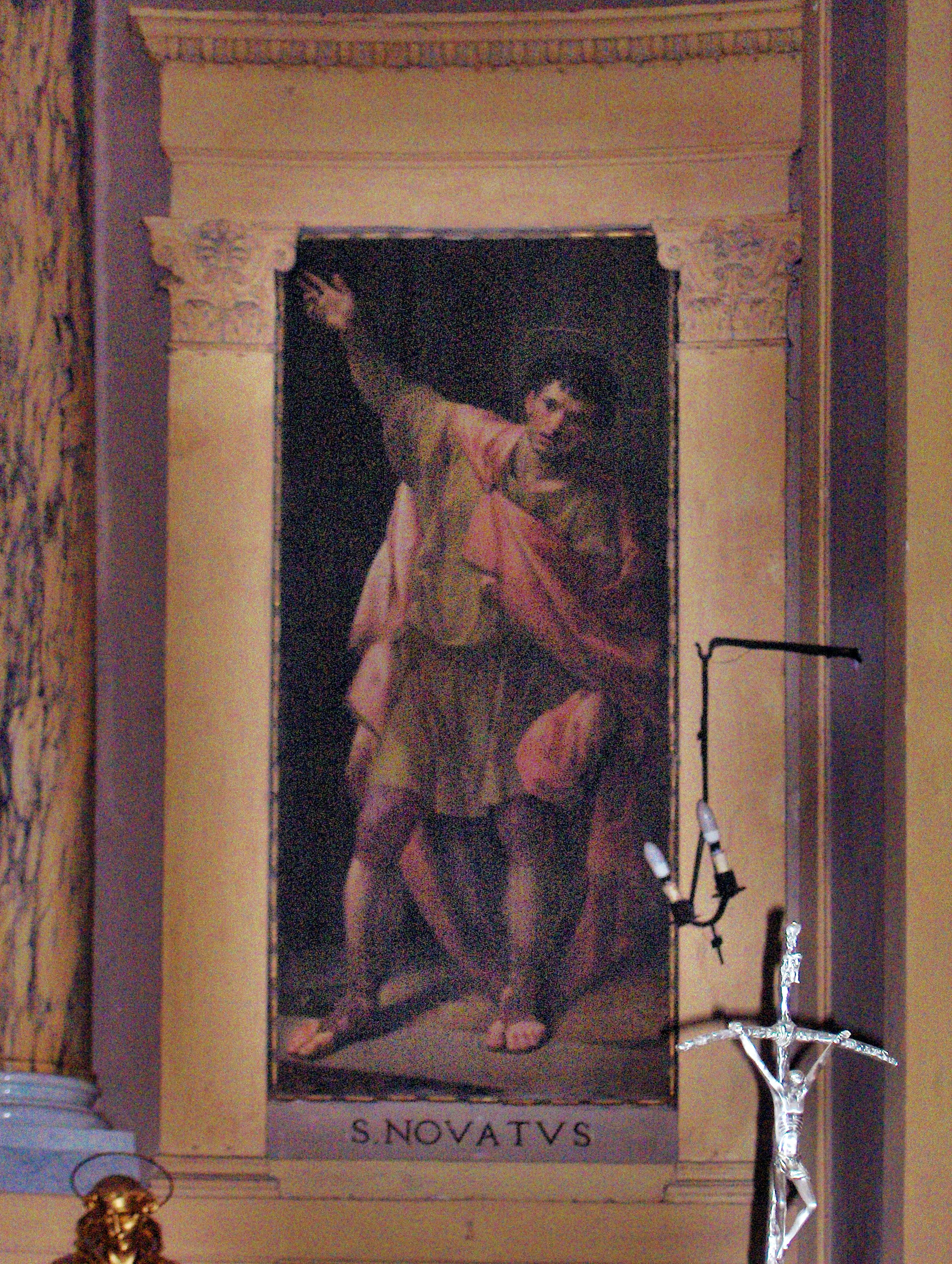
- St. Novatus by Bernardino Nocchi (1803), church of Santa Pudenziana, Rome, Italy

Confessor
- Born: Rome
- Died: 151
- Venerated in: Roman Catholic Church, Eastern Orthodox Church
- Canonized: pre-congregation
- Feast: 20 June

Novatus (died c. 151) is an early Christian saint. His feast day is 20 June.

Novatus and his brother, the martyr Timotheus, were the sons of Pudens, and the brothers of Pudentiana and Praxedes. His paternal grandfather was Quintus Cornelius Pudens, the Roman senator, who with his wife, Priscilla, was among Peter's earliest converts in Rome and in whose house the apostle dwelt while in that city. A portion of the structure of the modern church of Santa Pudenziana (Via Urbana) is thought to be part of the senatorial palace or of the baths built by Novatus.

According to the 5th-century church historian Philostorgius, Novatus was of Phrygian descent.

The city of Novato, California, is named after a local Miwok leader who had probably been given the name of Novatus at his baptism.
