= Saint Pudens =

1st century Christian saint and martyr

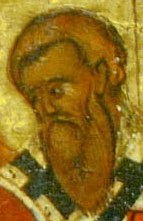

Martyr
- Died: Neronian persecution Rome, Latium, Roman Italy
- Venerated in: Eastern Orthodox Church; Eastern Catholic Churches; Catholic Church
- Beatified: Pre-congregation
- Feast: Catholic Church: Dominican calendar: 19 May; Eastern Catholic and Orthodox Churches: 14 April

Pudens was an early Christian saint and martyr. He is mentioned as a layman of the Roman Church in 2 Timothy 4:21.

== Life ==
Born to a family of wealth and distinction, possibly of the Gens Cornelia, he was the son of Quintus Cornelius Pudens, a Roman senator, and his wife Priscilla, among the first converted by Peter in Rome.

Pudens was baptised by Peter, who was a guest in his parents' house in Rome. A member of the Roman Senate, he was the father of two sons, Novatus and Timotheus, and, according to legend, two daughters, Praxedes and Pudentiana. Pudens was martyred under Nero (reigned 54–68) and buried in the Catacomb of Priscilla on the Via Salaria.

The acts of the synod of Pope Symmachus (499) show the existence of a titulus Pudentis, a church with the authority to administer sacraments, which was also known as ecclesia Pudentiana.

He is commemorated on April 14 and also January 4 in the Eastern Orthodox Church calendar and May 19 according to the Dominican Martyrology.

== See also ==
- Santa Prassede
- Santa Pudenziana
