= Brian O'Doherty =

Irish-American art critic, writer, visual artist, and academic(1928–2022)

- Born: 4 May 1928; Ballaghaderreen, County Roscommon, Ireland
- Died: 7 November 2022 (aged 94); New York City, U.S.
- Other name: Patrick Ireland
- Spouse: Barbara Novak

Brian O'Doherty (4 May 1928 – 7 November 2022) was an Irish-American art critic, writer, visual artist, and academic. He lived in New York City for over 50 years, serving as an art critic for The New York Times and NBC, as well as an editor for Art in America. He used a number of alter egos, including Patrick Ireland.

== Early life and education ==
O'Doherty was born at Ballaghaderreen in County Roscommon in 1928, and grew up in Dublin. He studied medicine at University College Dublin, and did post-graduate work at Cambridge University and at the Harvard School of Public Health. In 1957, O'Doherty spent a year working in a cancer hospital before devoting himself full-time to the visual arts. Speaking of his experience after Harvard:

I first spent a year at Harvard when I came in 1957, doing all kinds of research. I got an MSc there, but I didn’t learn much. I switched from all things medical. I auditioned for a job as a television presenter at the Museum of Fine Arts from the Boston public television station, WGBH—TV. I would do a half-hour each week from the galleries on the museum collections, also interviews with artists – Marc Chagall, Jacques Lipchitz, Josef Albers, Walter Gropius, among others.

== Career ==
In the 1960s, O'Doherty was an art critic for the New York Times. He commissioned Roland Barthes to write his "Death of the Author" essay for a special edition of Aspen magazine in 1967. He was also an editor of Art in America and an on-air art critic for NBC.

In his mid-career, O'Doherty began signing his work under the name "Patrick Ireland" in reaction to the Bloody Sunday killings in Derry in 1972. For many years, O'Doherty was an influential member of the senior staff of the National Endowment for the Arts; first as director of the Visual Arts Program, and subsequently as director of the Media Arts Program, where he was responsible for the creation of such major public television series as American Masters and Great Performances.

He authored numerous works of art criticism, including his books American Masters (1973) and Inside the White Cube: The Ideology of the Gallery Space (1976), a series of essays first published in Artforum. In the latter book, he discusses and invents the term for the contemporary gallery space. He also wrote novels: The Strange Case of Mademoiselle P. (1992), the 2000 Booker Prize-nominated The Deposition of Father McGreevy (1999), and The Crossdresser's Secret (2014). He had a retrospective at Dublin's Hugh Lane Municipal Gallery of Modern Art in 2005.

In 1975, after a visit to the home of Beverly Pepper in Todi, Italy, O'Doherty and his wife bought a vacation home in the town, and painted the plastered interior walls in vibrant colors. The house is now open for tours and is known as the Casa Dipinta of Todi.

On 20 May 2008, in recognition of the progress for peace in Ireland, O'Doherty ceremoniously buried his alter ego at the Irish Museum of Modern Art in Dublin, and resumed being called by his birth name.

In 2018, at the age of 90, O’Doherty was the subject of three exhibitions celebrating his work in his native Ireland, including the restoration of the room sized “One Here Now” installation he created at the Sirius Arts Centre in Cork in 1995-96.

In The modern art collection, Trinity College Dublin, David Scott writes that:

Much influenced by Marcel Duchamp he is an essentially interrogative artist, constantly questioning artistic conventions and the assumptions on which we base our aesthetic judgements.

== Personal life and death ==
For more than 30 years, O'Doherty was married to art historian and former chair of the Art History department at Barnard College, Barbara Novak. He lived and worked in the United States.

O'Doherty died at his home in New York on 7 November 2022, at the age of 94.
