= Włodzimierz Czacki =

Polish prelate

His Eminence Włodzimierz Czacki
- Cardinal-Priest of Santa Pudenziana
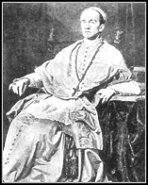
- Church: Roman Catholic Church
- Appointed: 15 March 1883
- Term ended: 8 March 1888
- Predecessor: Domenico Sanguigni
- Successor: Giuseppe Benedetto Dusmet
- Previous posts: Secretary of the Congregation for Extraordinary Ecclesiastical Affairs (1877-79); Titular Archbishop of Salamis postea Constantia (1879-82); Apostolic Nuncio to France (1879-82)

Orders
- Ordination: 30 November 1867 by Alessandro Franchi
- Consecration: 17 August 1879 by Flavio Chigi
- Created cardinal: 25 September 1882 by Pope Leo XIII
- Rank: Cardinal priest

Personal details
- Born: 16 April 1834 Poryck, Volhynia, Russian Empire (modern-Ukraine)
- Died: 8 March 1888 (aged 53) Rome, Kingdom of Italy
- Parents: Wiktor Kazimierz Czacki; Pelgia Sapieha
- Education: Pontifical Roman Athenaeum Saint Apollinare

Count Włodzimierz Czacki (Polish pronunciation: [vwɔˈd͡ʑimʲɛʂ ˈt͡ʂat͡skʲi], 16 April 1834 – 8 March 1888) was a Polish prelate of the Catholic Church who spent his career in the Roman Curia. He was created a cardinal in 1882.

== Biography ==
Włodzimierz Czacki was born in Lutsk (Volhynia governorate, Russian Empire), today in Ukraine, on 16 April 1834. His family belonged to the nobility and he had the title count. He went to Rome at age 17 and, except for a few years as a diplomat in Paris, spent the rest of his life there.

He was ordained a priest on 30 November 1867 by Alessandro Franchi secretary of the Congregation of Bishops and Regulars.

He served as Secretary to Pope Pius IX.

He was appointed secretary of the Sacred Congregation of Studies. He served as a Consultor at the First Vatican Council. He was named domestic prelate of his holiness in 1871.

He was appointed Secretary of the Congregation of Extraordinary Ecclesiastical Affairs on 15 March 1877. He worked in the completion of the policies dealing with the Kulturkampf in 1878. He was decorated with the Order of Carlos III, ca. 1879. He was admitted to the Sovereign Order of Malta, as bailiff grand cross of magistral grace, on 31 March 1879.

He was appointed titular archbishop of Salamis on 12 August 1879. He was consecrated a bishop on 17 August 1879 by Cardinal Flavio Chigi.

He was appointed Apostolic Nuncio to France on 19 September 1879; prevented the rupture of the Concordat between the Holy See and the French government and avoided the liquidation of certain religious orders.

He was made a cardinal of the order of cardinal priests on 25 September 1882 by Pope Leo XIII. Pope Leo gave him his red galero and assigned his the titular church of Santa Pudenziana on 15 March 1883.

He died in Rome on 8 March 1888 and was buried in the Campo Verano cemetery.
