= Domenico Sanguigni =

Italian cardinal and apostolic nuncio

His Eminence Domenico Sanguigni
- Cardinal-Priest of Santa Pudenziana
- Church: Roman Catholic Church
- Appointed: 27 February 1880
- Term ended: 20 November 1882
- Predecessor: Lucien Bonaparte
- Successor: Włodzimierz Czacki
- Previous posts: Titular Archbishop of Tarsus (1874-79); Apostolic Nuncio to Portugal (1874-79)

Orders
- Consecration: 23 August 1874 by Alessandro Franchi
- Created cardinal: 19 September 1879 by Pope Leo XIII
- Rank: Cardinal-Priest

Personal details
- Born: Domenico Sanguigni; 27 June 1809 Terracina, Papal States
- Died: 20 November 1882 (aged 73) Rome, Kingdom of Italy

Domenico Sanguigni (27 June 1809 – 20 November 1882) was an Italian cardinal and apostolic nuncio.
