= Pudentiana =

Christian virgin and martyr

Saint Pudentiana
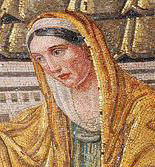
- Saint Pudentiana in the mosaic of the apse of the Santa Pudenziana

Virgin, martyr
- Venerated in: Catholic Church; Eastern Orthodox Church
- Beatified: Pre-Congregation
- Canonized: Pre-Congregation
- Major shrine: Santa Pudenziana
- Feast: 19 May
- Attributes: Oil lamp, laurel wreath (for Christ)
- Patronage: Basilica of Santa Pudenziana in Rome; Philippines

Pudentiana was a Christian virgin and martyr of the second century who refused to worship the Roman Emperors Marcus Aurelius and Antoninus Pius as deities. As the eldest daughter of the Roman senator Pudens, she is sometimes locally known as "Potentiana" and is often associated with her younger sister, Praxedes, the martyr.

== Legend ==
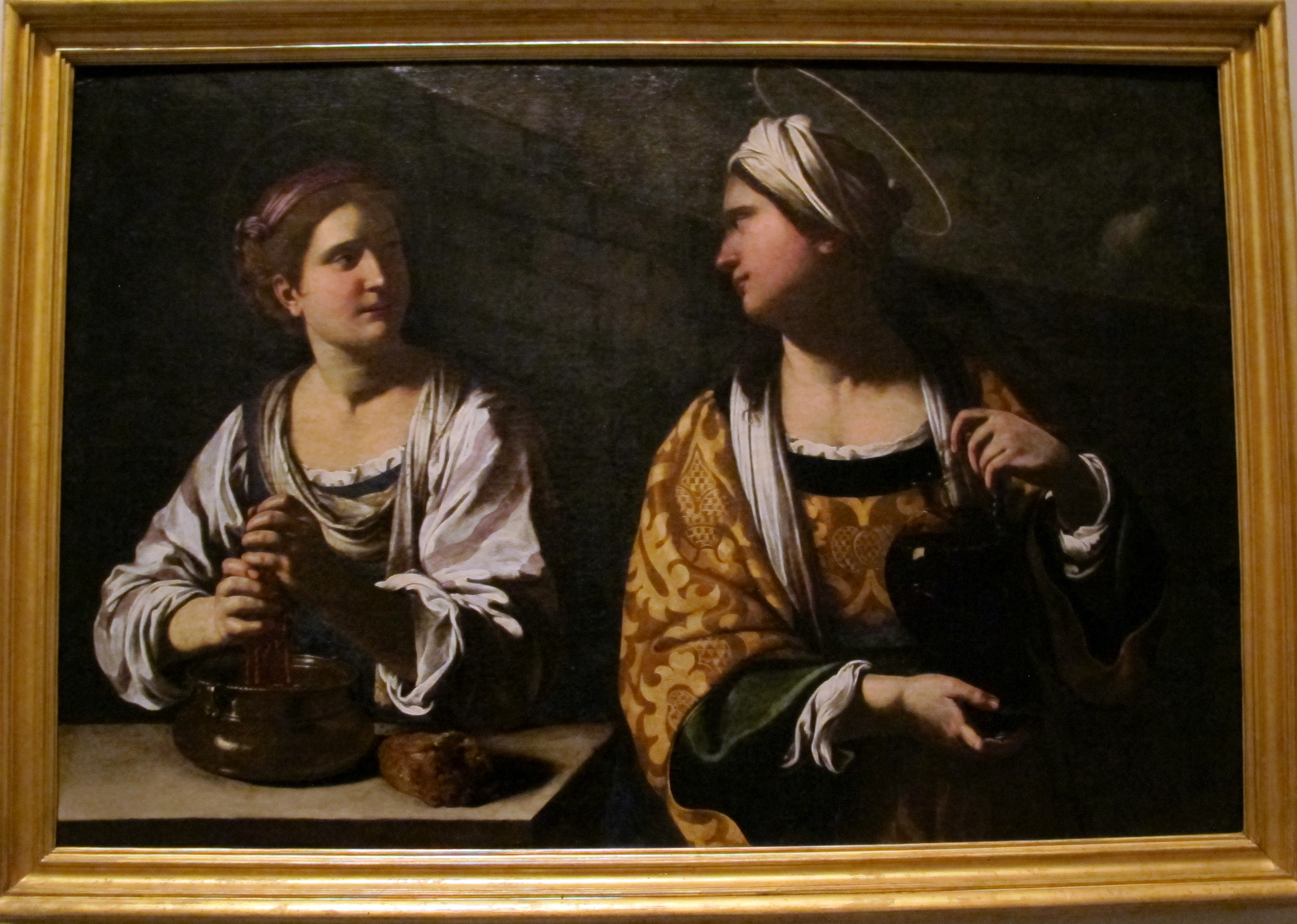
Praxedes and Pudentiana, by Antiveduto Grammatica

According to her acta and the Martyrology of Reichenau, she was a Roman virgin of the early church, daughter of Saint Pudens, friend of the Apostles, and sister of Praxedes.

Praxedes and Pudentiana, together with Pope Pius I, had built a baptistry in the church inside their father's house, and started to baptize pagans. Pudentiana died at the age of 16 and is buried next to her father Pudens, in the Priscilla catacombs on the via Salaria.

While there is evidence for the life of Pudens, there is no direct evidence for either Pudentiana or Praxedes. It is possible that the early Church's Ecclesia Pudentiana (Latin for 'the church of Pudens') was mistaken for "Saint Pudentiana".

== Veneration ==
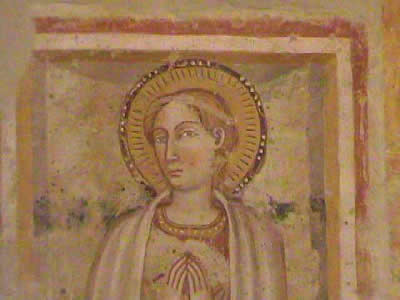
Saint Pudentiana, Fresco of the 15th century, from the church of Santa Pudenziana in Narni, Italy

Santa Pudenziana, a basilica in Rome, is dedicated to her, and her commemoration in the General Roman Calendar fell on 19 May until its 1969 revision. Pudentiana is still mentioned on 19 May in the Roman Martyrology.

The Spanish conquistador Miguel López de Legazpi, the founder of the modern City of Manila, gained possession of the territory on 19 May 1571. As it was the feast of Saint Pudentiana (in Spanish: Potenciana), Legazpi declared her the patroness.

By the Apostolic Letter Impositi Nobis Apostolici of 12 September 1942, Pope Pius XII, at the request of the Philippine episcopacy, declared the Virgin Mary under the title of the Immaculate Conception as principal patroness of the country, with Saints Pudentiana and Rose of Lima as secondary patronesses, mentioning that historical documents indicated Pudentiana as patroness from the 16th century and Rose of Lima from the 17th.

== Homonymous town in Numidia ==
The name Pudentiana is also the name of an unrelated ancient town and episcopal see in the Roman province of Numidia, which is among the titular sees listed in the Annuario Pontificio.
