= Barbara Novak =

American art historian (born 1929)

- Spouse: Brian O'Doherty
- Awards: Guggenheim Fellowship (1974)

Academic background
- Education: Barnard College (BA); Radcliffe College (PhD)

Academic work
- Discipline: Art history
- Institutions: Barnard College

Barbara J. Novak (born 1929) is an American art historian. She was the Helen Goodhart Altschul Professor of Art History at Barnard College from 1958 to 1998.

== Biography ==
Novak was born in New York City in 1929. She grew up in Far Rockaway, Queens and took art courses with Belle Icahn, mother of financier Carl Icahn. She also studied at the Art Students League of New York and Parsons School of Design.

Novak graduated from Barnard College in 1950 and attended Radcliffe College for graduate work. She was trained under Rubens and Rembrandt scholar Julius S. Held at Barnard and under Jakob Rosenberg at Radcliffe. She received a Fulbright fellowship in 1953 to pursue her dissertation on the Hudson River School artists Thomas Cole and Asher Durand. Novak joined the Barnard College faculty in 1958.

Novak published American Painting of the Nineteenth Century: Realism, Idealism and the American Experience in 1969. Her second book, Nature and Culture: American Landscape and Painting, 1825-1875, was described as "the most important contribution to the understanding of nineteenth-century American art that has been written in our generation" by John I. H. Baur of the Whitney Museum of American Art and was chosen as one of the Ten Best Books of the Year by the New York Times. The book was also the National Book Award for Nonfiction finalist in 1982.

Her most recent book Voyages of The Self: Pairs, Parallels, and Patterns in American Art and Literature was included in the Oxford University Press trilogy American Painting of the Nineteenth Century, Nature and Culture.

Novak received a Guggenheim Fellowship in 1974.

== Personal life ==
Novak married the Irish art critic Brian O'Doherty in 1960.
