= Guillaume Arrufat =

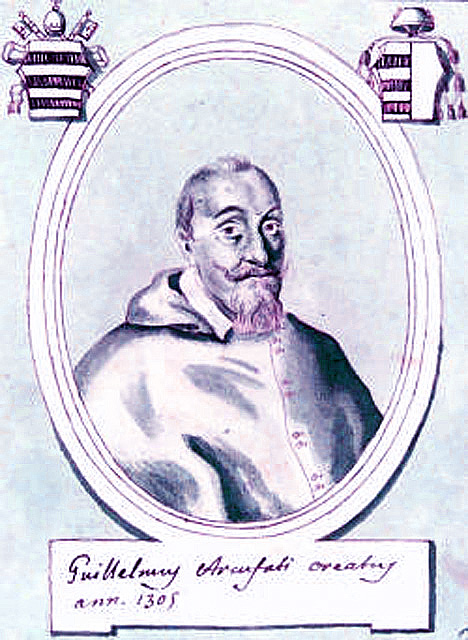

Guillaume Arrufat (died 24 February 1311), also known as Guillaume D'Arrufat, Guillaume Ruffat des Forges, Guillelmus Rufati, Guglielmo Rufati, etc., was a Cardinal of the Roman Catholic Church.

A nephew of Pope Clement V, he was ordained deacon of Saint-Seurin de Bordeaux on 3 May and 12 June 1301. He was ordained Cardinal of Santa Pudenziana in 1306.
