= Santa Prassede, Todi =

Church in Todi, Italy

Coordinates: 42.78353°N 12.407631°E

Santa Prassede is a Gothic-style, Roman Catholic church located on Via Santa Prassede #71, east of the central Piazza del Popolo in Todi, province of Perugia, region of Umbria,

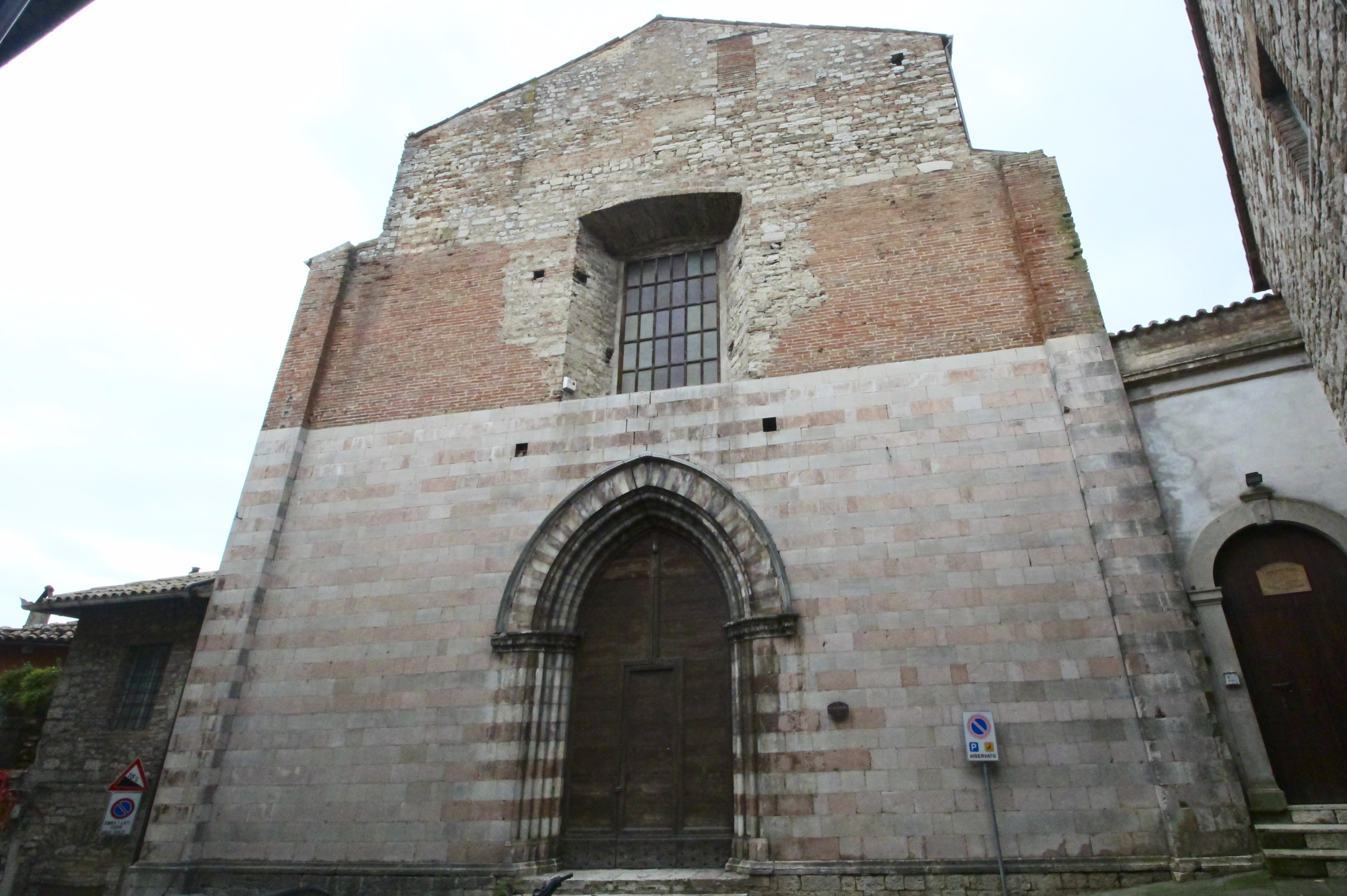
Facade of church

An older 11th century church stood at the site affiliated with an Augustinian convent. Documents take note of former in 1340, and the latter in the early 14th-century. Like the cathedral in this town, the present structure was erected in a Gothic style. It appears that initially only the lower stage of the church was completed with stone sheathing of alternating red and white strips.

In 1557, the impetus to refurbish the walls of the town, let to the demolition of an extramural Augustinian convent and church and consolidation with this one. The Augustinian convent was suppressed in 1888. Subsequently, used at a school, only a portion of the cloister remains. From 1954 to 1960, the church underwent restoration. In addition, artworks and altars from the dilapidated or deconsecrated churches of San Silvestro, Sant'Eligio, and the Chiesa di Montecristo, were moved here.
