= Antiveduto Grammatica =

Italian painter

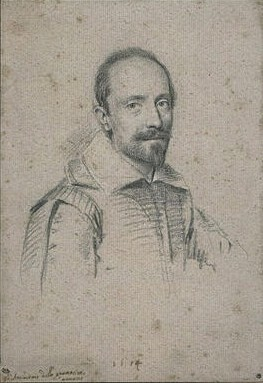
Antiveduto Grammatica, by Ottavio Leoni

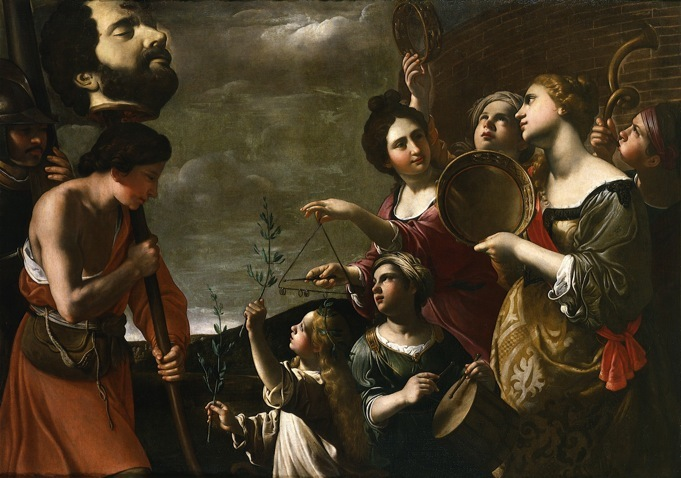
David regresa triunfante con la cabeza de Goliath (David returns triumphant with the head of Goliath), c. 1610

Antiveduto Grammatica (December 1569 – April 1626) was a proto-Baroque Italian painter, active near Rome.

Grammatica was born in Rome, where he was baptised in December 1569. According to Giovanni Baglione the artist was given the name Antiveduto ("foreseen") because his father had a premonition that he would soon be born during a journey between his native Siena and Rome. It was in Rome that Antiveduto was raised and based his career. His apprenticeship with the Perugian artist Giovanni Domenico Angelini (Giandomenico Perugino) introduced him to small-scale work, mostly on copper. He gained the nickname "gran Capocciante" because he specialised in painting heads of famous men. A decade later, in 1591, Antiveduto set up as an independent artist.

Grammatica's earliest surviving public commission, an old-fashioned configuration depicting Christ the Saviour with St. Stanislaus of Krakow, St. Adalbert of Prague and St Hyacinth Odrowaz, was painted for the high altar of Santo Stanislao dei Polacchi. Characterized by Giulio Mancini as most zealous in his profession, Antiveduto began his association with the Accademia di San Luca in 1593. He gained great familiarity with the two protectors of the Academy, Cardinals Federico Borromeo and Francesco Maria Del Monte, and was closely attached to the latter; so much so that he was elected to the highest office of the association as "principe" in 1624. Shortly after this, however, he became embroiled in scandal. The machinations of Grammatica's enemy Tommaso Salini over the attempt to sell off the Accademia's altarpiece, thought to be by Raphael, brought about a humiliating retreat, when Cardinal Del Monte intervened to re-establish the constitution of the institution. His fortunes were in a way linked with the Cardinal himself, who was much frowned upon by the Barberini, and his death preceded that of Del Monte by four months, in April 1626.

His works are exhibited in numerous public collections, including the State Hermitage Museum, St Petersburg; the Museo Nacional del Prado, Madrid; the Kunsthistorisches Museum, Vienna; the Brukenthal National Museum, Romania; and the Kelvingrove Art Gallery and Museum, Glasgow.
