= Tommaso Martinelli =

Italian cardinal

His Eminence Tommaso Maria Martinelli O.E.S.A.
- Camerlengo Emeritus of the College of Cardinals
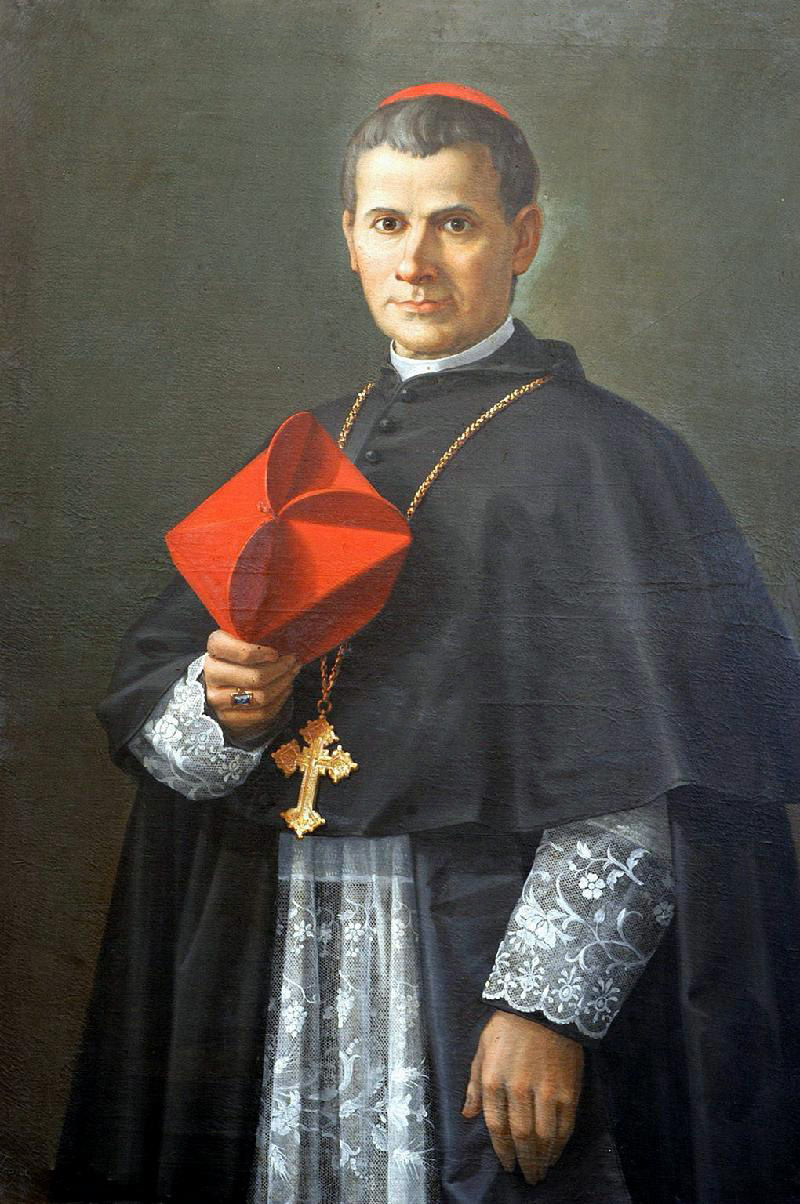
- Painting - Tito Troja (1884)
- Appointed: 15 March 1883
- Term ended: 24 March 1884
- Predecessor: Luigi Oreglia di Santo Stefano
- Successor: Mieczysław Halka-Ledóchowski
- Other post: Cardinal-Bishop of Sabina (1884–1888)
- Previous posts: Cardinal-Deacon of San Giorgio in Velabro (1874–1875); Pro-Prefect of the Congregation of Studies (1874–1877); Cardinal-Priest of Santa Prisca (1875–1884); Prefect of the Congregation for Rites (1877–1878); Prefect of the Congregation of the Index (1878–1883)

Orders
- Ordination: 22 December 1849 by Costantino Patrizi Naro
- Consecration: 30 March 1884 by Raffaele Monaco La Valletta
- Created cardinal: 22 December 1873 by Pope Pius IX
- Rank: Cardinal-Deacon (1874–1875); Cardinal-Priest (1875–1884); Cardinal-Bishop (1884–1888)

Personal details
- Born: Tommaso Maria Martinelli; 4 February 1827 Sant'Anna, Lucca, Duchy of Lucca
- Died: 30 March 1888 (aged 61) Rome, Kingdom of Italy
- Buried: Campo Verano
- Parents: Cosma Martinelli; Maddalena Partini

Styles of Tommaso Martinelli
- Reference style: His Eminence
- Spoken style: Your Eminence
- Informal style: Cardinal
- See: Sabina (suburbicarian see)

Tommaso Maria Martinelli (4 February 1827 – 30 March 1888) was a Cardinal of the Roman Catholic Church who served as Prefect of the Congregation of Rites.

Tommaso Martinelli was born in the parish of Sant'Anna, Lucca as the son of Cosma Martinelli and Maddalena Pardini. He was the brother of Cardinal Sebastiano Martinelli.

== Education ==
He entered the Order of Hermits of Saint Augustine (Augustinians) in Lucca in 1842 and was professed on 19 April 1844.

== Priesthood ==
He was ordained on 22 December 1849 in Rome. He was lecturer in the monastery and college of St Augustine, Rome and served as regent of studies of the school in September 1855. He became assistant professor of Scripture at La Sapienza University in Rome in 1856. He was full professor from 1862 to 1870. He visited Belgium, the Netherlands, Ireland, Bavaria and Bohemia with the superior general of the order in 1862. He was consultor of the Congregation of the Index in 1864. He was a theologian at the First Vatican Council from 1869 to 1870.

== Cardinalate ==
He was created Cardinal-Deacon of S. Giorgio in Velabro by Pope Pius IX in the consistory of 22 December 1873. He was appointed as Prefect of the Congregation of Studies on 12 March 1874. He opted for the order of cardinal priests and the title of Santa Prisca on 17 September 1875. He was appointed as Prefect of the Congregation of Rites on 18 October 1877. He participated in the conclave of 1878 that elected Pope Leo XIII. He remained at the Congregation for Rites until he was appointed as Prefect of the Congregation of the Index on 15 July 1878. He served as Camerlengo of the Sacred College of Cardinals from 15 March 1883 until 24 March 1884.

== Episcopate ==
He opted for the order of cardinal bishops, taking the suburbicarian see of Sabina on 24 March 1884.

== Death ==
He died in 1888, at 6:45 a.m. in Rome, after a brief illness; his body was exposed in the church of S. Agostino, Rome, where the funeral took place on 4 April at 10 a.m. The final absolution was imparted by Cardinal Carlo Sacconi, Dean of the Sacred College of Cardinals; eighteen cardinals were also in attendance; the remains were buried in the chapel of his order in the Campo Verano cemetery.

Catholic Church titles
| Preceded by Luigi Oreglia di Santo Stefano | Camerlengo of the Sacred College of Cardinals; 15 March 1883–24 March 1884 | Succeeded by Mieczysław Halka Ledóchowski |
| Preceded by Luigi Bilio | Cardinal-Bishop of Sabina; 24 March 1884–30 March 1888 | Succeeded by Luigi Serafini |
