= Lucido Parocchi =

Italian cardinal

His Eminence Lucido Maria Parocchi
- Secretary of the Congregation of the Holy Office
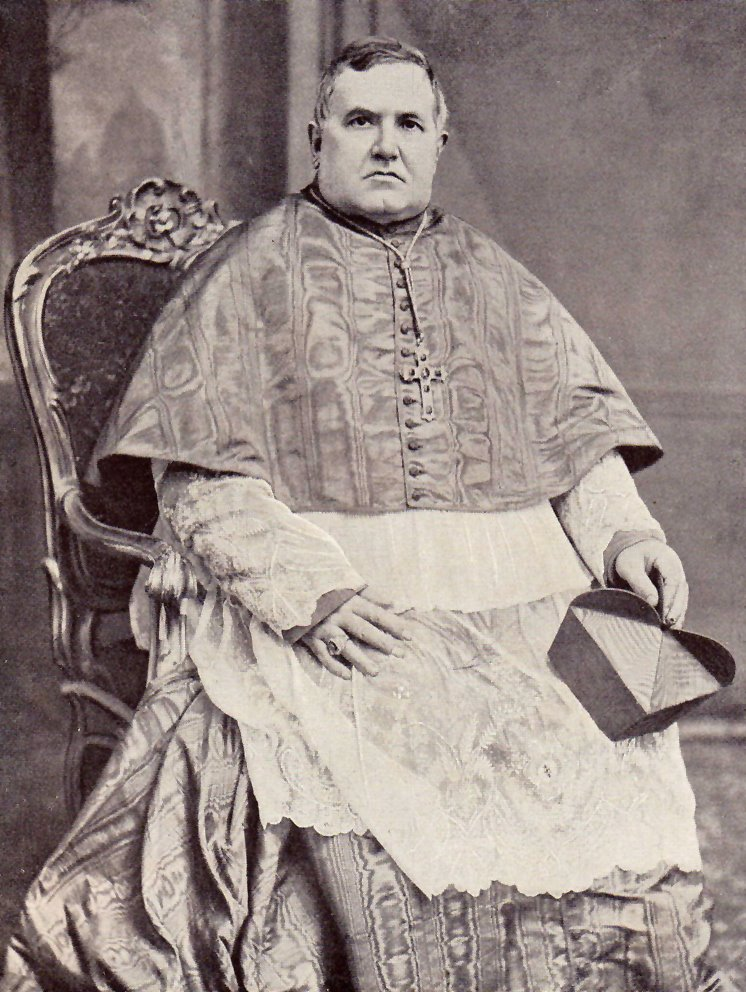
- Church: Catholic
- Appointed: 5 August 1896
- Term ended: 15 January 1903
- Predecessor: Raffaele Monaco La Valletta
- Successor: Serafino Vannutelli
- Other posts: Cardinal-Bishop of Porto e Santa Rufina (1896–1903); Cardinal-Priest of San Lorenzo in Damaso (1899–1903); Vice-Chancellor of the Apostolic Chancery (1899–1903)
- Previous posts: Bishop of Pavia (1871–77); Archbishop of Bologna (1877–82); Cardinal-Priest of San Sisto (1877–84); Vicar General of Rome (1884–99); Cardinal-Priest of Santa Croce in Gerusalemme (1884–89); Camerlengo of the College of Cardinals (1888–89); Cardinal-Bishop of Albano (1889–96)

Orders
- Ordination: 17 May 1856 by Costantino Patrizi Naro
- Consecration: 5 November 1871 by Costantino Patrizi Naro
- Created cardinal: 22 June 1877 by Pope Pius IX
- Rank: Cardinal-Priest (1877–89); Cardinal-Bishop (1889–1903)

Personal details
- Born: Lucido Maria Parocchi; 13 August 1833 Mantua, Kingdom of Lombardy–Venetia
- Died: 15 January 1903 (aged 69) Rome, Kingdom of Italy
- Education: Collegio Romano
- Coat of arms

Lucido Maria Parocchi (13 August 1833 – 15 January 1903) was an Italian cardinal of the Catholic Church. He served as Secretary of the Supreme Sacred Congregation of the Holy Office from 5 August 1896 until his death.

== Biography ==
Lucido Maria Parocchi was born in Mantua as the son of Antonio Parocchi, a rich miller, and Genoveva Soresina. He was educated at the Seminary of Mantua, and later at the Collegio Romano. He was awarded a doctorate in theology on 5 September 1856.

He was ordained to the priesthood on 17 May 1856, by Costantino Patrizi Naro, Cardinal Vicar General of Rome. He returned to the diocese of Mantua, where he worked as a professor of ecclesiastical history, moral theology, and canon law at its seminary. He was created Domestic prelate of His Holiness on 10 March 1871 by Pius IX.

He became Bishop of Pavia in 1871, being consecrated on 5 November of that year in the church of Santissima Trinità al Monte Pincio by Cardinal Patrizi Naro; he was promoted to the metropolitan see of Bologna on 12 March 1877.

Parocchi was created Cardinal-Priest of San Sisto Vecchio by Pope Pius in the consistory of 22 June 1877. He participated in the conclave of 1878 that elected Pope Leo XIII. He resigned pastoral government of the archdiocese on 28 June 1882. He opted for the title of Cardinal-Priest of Santa Croce in Gerusalemme on 24 March 1884. He was appointed as Camerlengo of the Sacred College of Cardinals by Pope Leo on 1 June 1888. He was elected to the order of bishops and the suburbicarian see of Albano on 24 May 1889. Pope Leo appointed him as Secretary of the Supreme Sacred Congregation of the Holy Office on 5 August 1896, a post he held until his death. He opted for the suburbicarian see of Porto e Santa Rufina in 1896.

He died in 1903.

Catholic Church titles
Preceded by Carlo Morichini	Archbishop of Bologna; 12 March 1877 – 28 June 1882	Succeeded by Francesco Battaglini
Preceded by Luigi Serafini	Camerlengo of the Sacred College of Cardinals; 1 June 1888 – 11 February 1889	Succeeded by Carlo Laurenzi
Preceded by Raffaele Monaco La Valletta	Cardinal-Bishop of Albano; 24 May 1889 – 30 November 1896	Succeeded by Isidoro Verga
Preceded by Raffaele Monaco La Valletta	Secretary of the Supreme Sacred Congregation of the Holy Office; 5 August 1896 – 15 January 1903	Succeeded by Serafino Vannutelli
Preceded by Luigi Oreglia di Santo Stefano	Cardinal-Bishop of Porto-Santa-Rufina; 30 November 1896 – 15 January 1903	Succeeded by Serafino Vannutelli
