= 1878 conclave =

Election of Catholic Pope Leo XIII

Papal conclave February 1878

Dates and location
- 18–20 February 1878; Sistine Chapel, Apostolic Palace, Kingdom of Italy

Key officials
- Dean: Luigi di San Filippo e Sorso
- Sub-dean: Camillo di Pietro
- Camerlengo: Gioacchino Pecci
- Protopriest: Josef von Schwarzenberg
- Protodeacon: Prospero Caterini
- Secretary: Pietro Lasagni

Election
- Electors: 61 (3 absentees)
- Ballots: 3

Elected pope
- Gioacchino Pecci; Name taken: Leo XIII
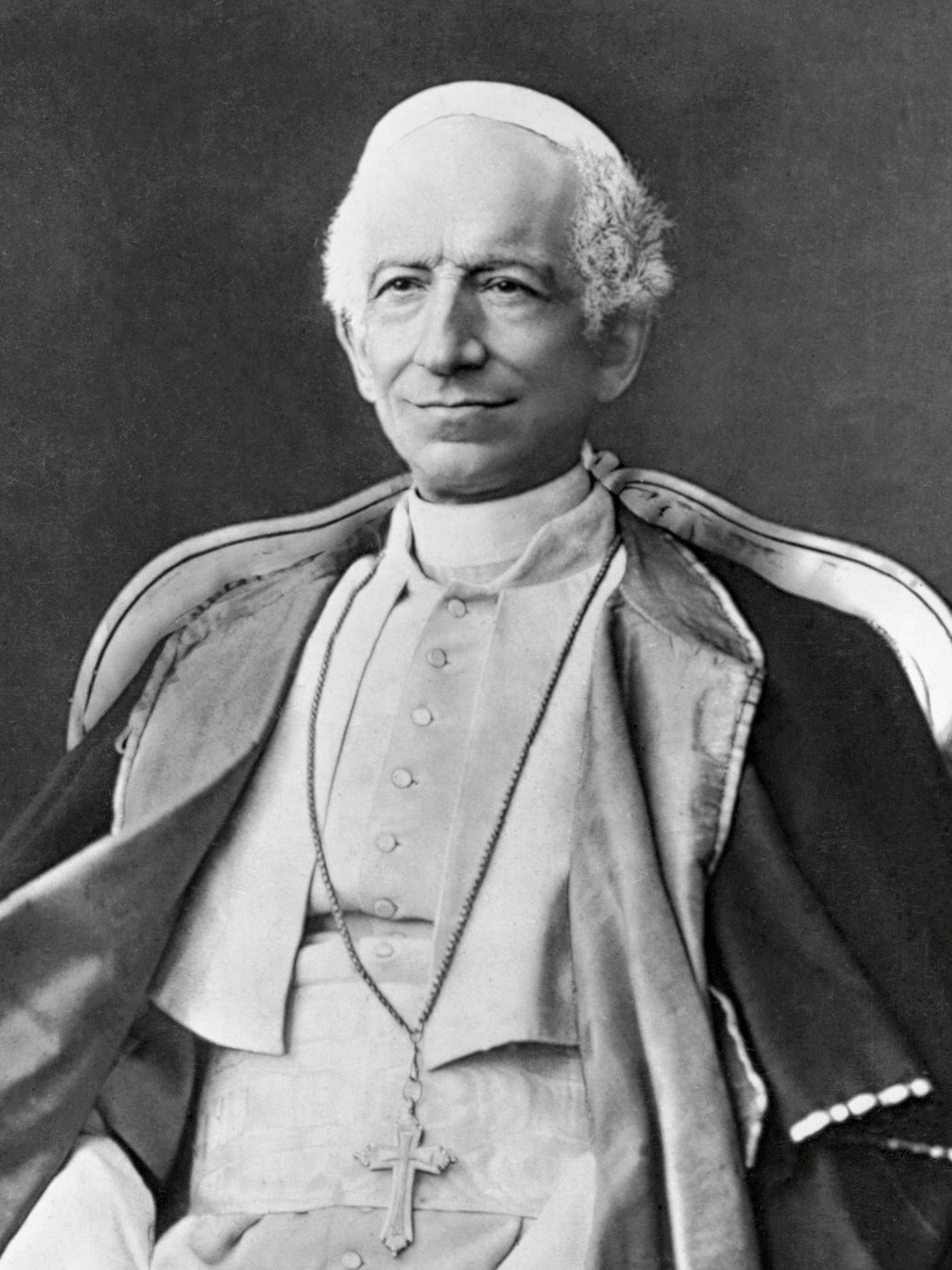

A conclave was held from 18 to 20 February 1878 to elect a new pope to succeed Pius IX, who had died on 7 February. Of the 64 members of the College of Cardinals, all but three attended. (Note: The current 80-year-old age limit for cardinal electors was introduced by Pope Paul VI in 1970.) On the third ballot, the conclave elected Cardinal Gioacchino Pecci, the camerlengo of the Apostolic Chamber and archbishop-bishop of Perugia. After accepting his election, he took the name Leo XIII.

It was the first election of a pope who would not rule the Papal States and the first to meet in the Apostolic Palace in the Vatican, since the venue used earlier in the 19th century, the Quirinal Palace, was now the palace of the king of Italy, Umberto I.

== Background ==
The cardinals assembled to conduct the conclave faced a number of questions. Chief of these questions was whether to choose a pope who would continue Pope Pius IX's conservative religious and political views, including the unacceptance of Italy's Law of Guarantees, which guaranteed the pope religious liberty in the Kingdom of Italy; Pius IX had previously described himself as a prisoner in the Vatican due to the situation. Conversely, the cardinals could also choose a candidate who would turn away from Pius IX's policies and could work for reconciliation with the king of Italy.

Other broader issues included the church-state relations in Italy; the Third French Republic; Ireland and the United States; the heresy which Pope Leo XIII later called Americanism; divisions in the church caused by the proclamation of papal infallibility by the First Vatican Council; and the status of the First Vatican Council, which had been halted suddenly and never concluded. The length of Pius IX's reign suggested the cardinals give special consideration to the age and health of the man they elected.

== Balloting and leaked results ==
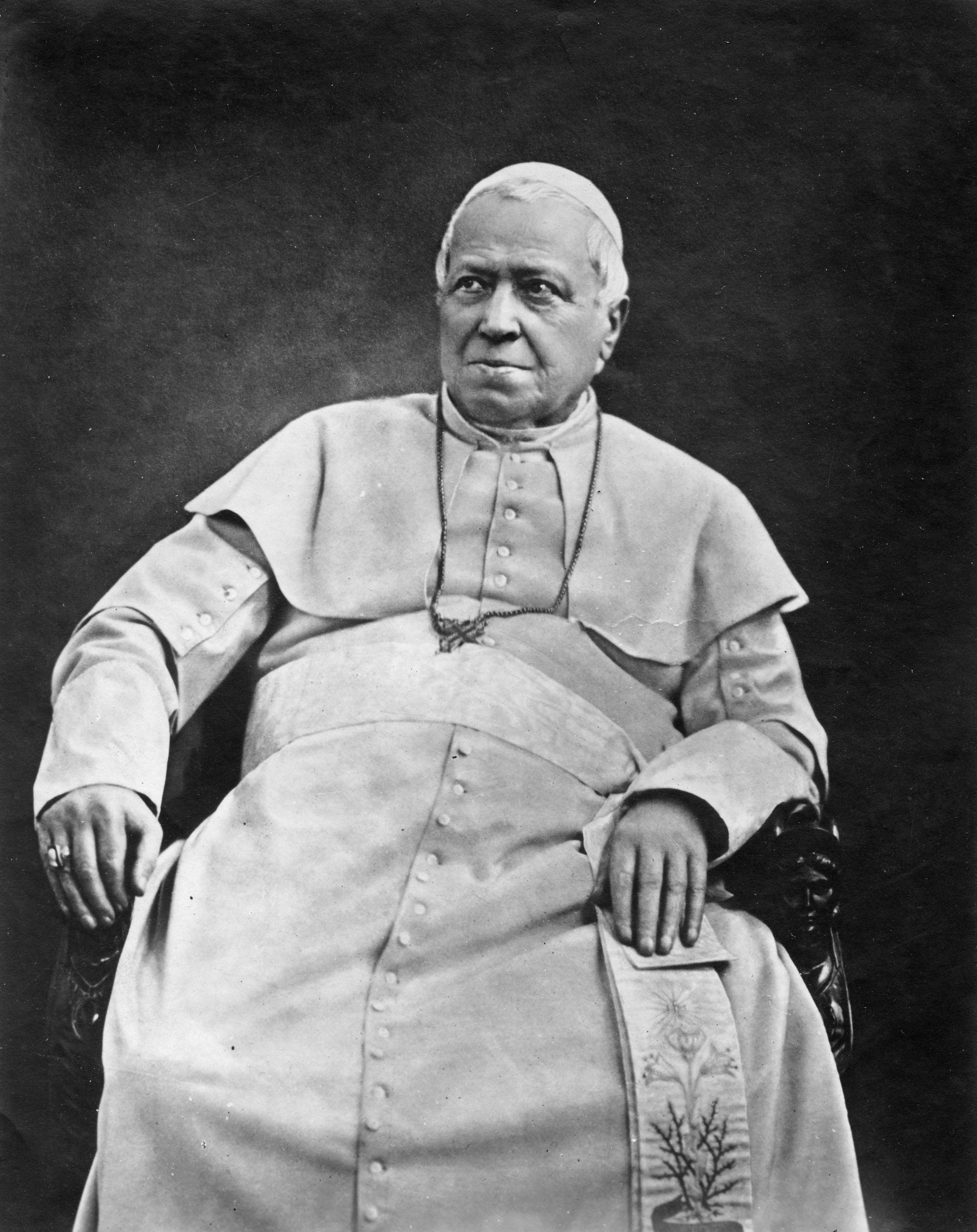
Pope Pius IX, whose conservative policies the cardinals rejected in electing the liberal Cardinal Gioacchino Pecci

Some 61 of 64 cardinals entered the conclave. Two others arrived too late from New York and Dublin to participate, and one did not attend for health reasons. Three of the 61 had participated in the previous conclave in 1846: Luigi Amat di San Filippo e Sorso, Fabio Maria Asquini, and Domenico Carafa della Spina di Traetto.

With what many churchmen believed was the "unstable" and "anti-Catholic" situation in a Rome that was no longer controlled by the church, some cardinals, notably Cardinal Manning, Archbishop of Westminster, urged that the conclave be moved outside Rome, perhaps even to Malta. However, Camerlengo Gioacchino Pecci advocated otherwise, and an initial vote among cardinals to move to Spain was overturned in a later vote. The conclave finally assembled in the Sistine Chapel in the Vatican on 18 February 1878.

Going into the conclave, Cardinal Pecci was the one candidate favored to be elected, in part because many of the cardinals who headed to Rome had already decided to elect him. In addition to Pecci's competent administration as camerlengo during the brief sede vacante period up to the conclave, Pecci was seen as the opposite of Pope Pius IX in terms of manner and temperament, and had also had a successful diplomatic career prior to being archbishop-bishop of Perugia. Pecci's election was also facilitated in that Alessandro Franchi, the candidate favored by the conservatives, urged his supporters to switch their support to the camerlengo.

One account reported the voting tabulations and the voting results without providing its source.

=== Morning of 19 February ===
==== First ballot ====
| Cardinals | Votes |
|---|---|
| Gioacchino Pecci | 19 |
| Luigi Bilio | 6 |
| Alessandro Franchi | 4 |
| Others | 32 |

This ballot was ruled invalid because at least one cardinal did not mark his ballot properly.

=== Afternoon of 19 February ===
==== Second ballot ====
| Cardinals | Votes |
|---|---|
| Gioacchino Pecci | 26 |
| Luigi Bilio | 7 |
| Alessandro Franchi | 2 |
| Others | 26 |

=== Morning of 20 February ===
==== Third ballot ====
| Cardinals | Votes |
|---|---|
| Gioacchino Pecci | 44 |
| Luigi Bilio | 5 |
| Alessandro Franchi | 0 |
| Others | 12 |

== Aftermath ==
The election of Cardinal Pecci, who took the name Leo XIII, was a victory for the liberals. Pecci had been an effective bishop whose diocese had moved from the Papal States to the Kingdom of Italy successfully, without Church problems. He was seen as a diplomatic pragmatist with the tact and flexibility opponents of the previous pope believed Pius IX lacked. At 68, Leo was also young enough to do the job without hindrance of health problems but old enough to offer the prospect of a relatively short reign of ten to fifteen years. Whereas Pius IX was seen as having isolated the Church from international opinion (his confining Jews in ghettos and his treatment of minorities had been condemned by world leaders such as Gladstone), Leo was seen as an "internationalist" who could earn back the Vatican some international respect.

Though always seemingly in poor health and delicate condition, Leo reigned for 25 years. He had the third longest reign of any pope until that time. Leo XIII was later surpassed by Pope John Paul II, who reigned for 26 years and six months from his election in October 1978 to his death in April of 2005. When Leo XIII died on 20 July 1903 at the age of 93, he had lived to be older than any of his known predecessors. He would be surpassed by Pope Benedict XVI, who died at the age of 95.

== Participants ==
Cardinal electors by region
| Region | Number |
|---|---|
| Italy | 40 |
| Rest of Europe | 21 |
| North America | 0 |
| South America | 0 |
| Asia | 0 |
| Oceania | 0 |
| Africa | 0 |
| Total | 61 |

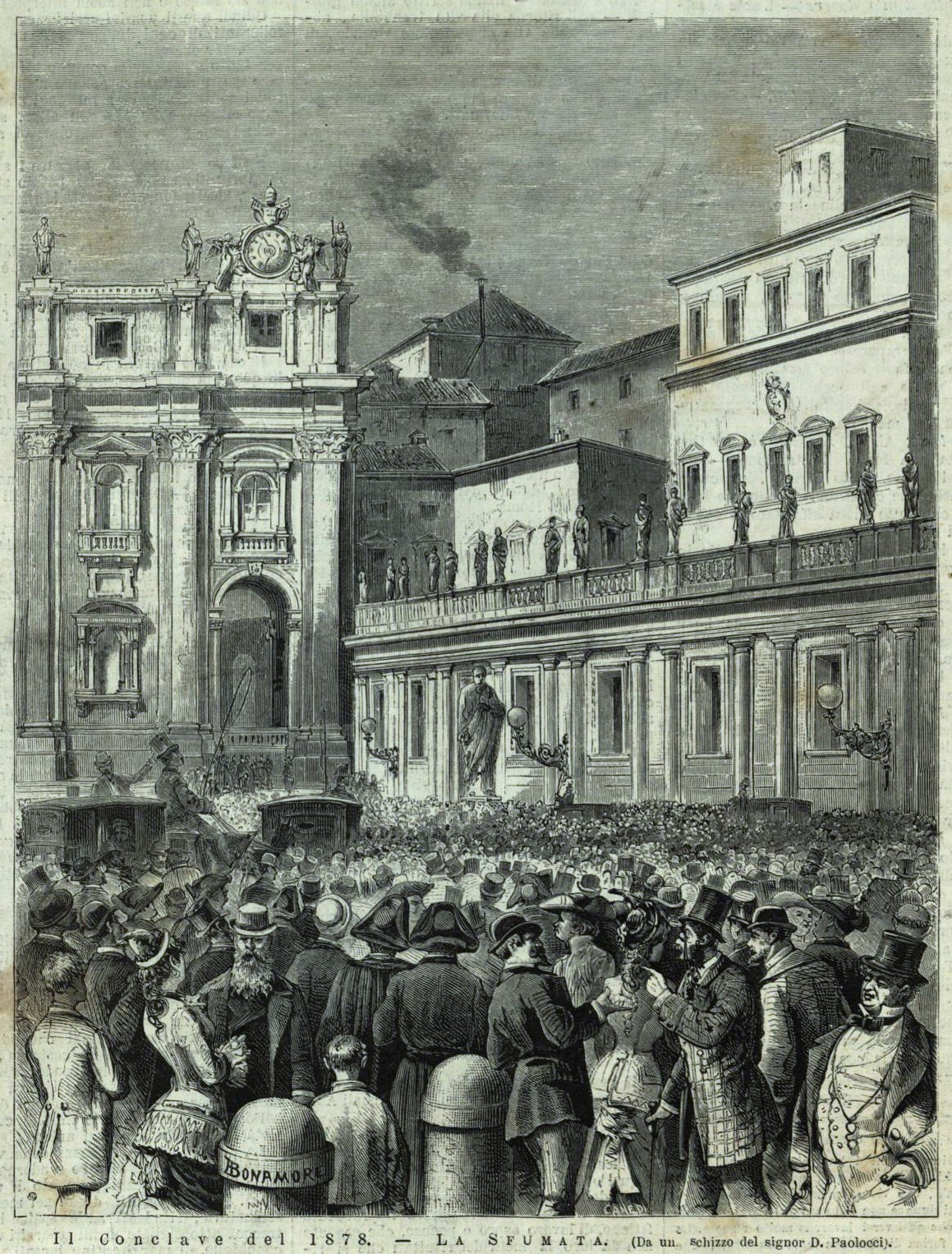
Black smoke rising from the Sistine Chapel during the 1878 conclave

- Dates: 18–20 February 1878
- Location: Sistine Chapel, Apostolic Palace
- Absent:
  - Godefroy Brossais-Saint-Marc, Archbishop of Rennes (France)
  - Paul Cullen, Archbishop of Dublin (Primate of Ireland)
  - John McCloskey, Archbishop of New York (United States) (Note: McCloskey sailed from New York on 9 February and reached Rome on 23 February.)
- Present:
  - Luigi Amat di San Filippo e Sorso, Dean of the College of Cardinals, Cardinal-Bishop of Ostia and Velletri
  - Camillo di Pietro, Cardinal-Bishop of Porto e Santa Ruffina
  - Carlo Sacconi, Cardinal-Bishop of Palestrina
  - Filippo Maria Guidi, Cardinal-Bishop of Frascati
  - Luigi Bilio, Cardinal-Bishop of Sabina
  - Carlo Luigi Morichini, Cardinal-Bishop of Albano
  - Friedrich Johannes Jacob Celestin von Schwarzenberg, Prince-Archbishop of Prague (Bohemia, part of Austria-Hungary)
  - Fabio Maria Asquini, Prefect of the Sacred Congregation of Indulgences and Sacred Relics
  - Domenico Carafa della Spina di Traetto, Archbishop of Benevento
  - Ferdinand-François-Auguste Donnet, Bordeaux
  - Gioacchino Pecci, Camerlengo, Archbishop-Bishop of Perugia (Italy)
  - Antonio Benedetto Antonucci, Ancona
  - Antonio Maria Panebianco, Prefect of the Sacred Congregation for Indulgences and Sacred Relics
  - Antonio Saverio De Luca, prefect of the Pontifical Congregation for Studies
  - Jean Baptiste François Pitra, librarian of the Vatican Library
  - Henri-Marie-Gaston Boisnormand de Bonnechose, Rouen
  - Gustav Adolph von Hohenlohe, Archpriest of Santa Maria Maggiore
  - Lucien-Louis-Joseph-Napoleon Bonaparte, Cardinal of Santa Pudenziana
  - Innocenzo Ferrieri, Camerlengo of the Sacred College of Cardinals
  - Giuseppe Berardi, Cardinal-Priest of Santi Marcellino e Pietro al Laterano
  - Juan Ignacio Moreno y Maisanove, Toledo
  - Raffaele Monaco La Valletta, Cardinal Vicar General of Rome
  - Inácio do Nascimento de Morais Cardoso, Patriarch of Lisbon (Note: Cardinal Cardoso arrived late and only participated in the final ballot.)
  - René-François Régnier, Archbishop of Cambrai (France)
  - Flavio Chigi, Grand Prior of Rome of the Sovereign Military Order of Malta
  - Alessandro Franchi, Prefect of Propagande Fide
  - Joseph-Hippolyte Guibert, Archbishop of Paris (France)
  - Luigi Oreglia di Santo Stefano, Prefect of the Sacred Congregation of Indulgences and Relics
  - János Simor, Esztergom
  - Tommaso Martinelli, Prefect of the Congregation for the Causes of Saints
  - Ruggero Luigi Emidio Antici Mattei
  - Pietro Giannelli, Cardinal-Priest of Sant'Agnese fuori le mura
  - Mieczyslaw Halka Ledóchowski, Archbishop of Gnesen and Posen, (Poland, part of the German Empire)
  - Henry Edward Manning, Archbishop of Westminster (Head of the Catholic Church in England and Wales)
  - Victor-Auguste-Isidor Deschamps, Archbishop of Mechelen (Belgium).
  - Giovanni Simeoni, Secretary of State of the Holy See
  - Domenico Bartolini, Cardinal-Priest of San Marco Evangelista al Campidoglio
  - Bartolomeo d'Avanzo, Bishop of Calvi e Teano (Italy)
  - Johann Baptist Franzelin, Jesuit theologian, Cardinal-Priest of Santi Bonifacio ed Alessio
  - Francisco de Paula Benavides y Navarrete, Patriarch of the West Indies
  - Francesco Saverio Apuzzo, Archbishop of Capua
  - Emmanuele Garcia Gil, Zaragoza
  - Edward Henry Howard, Protector of the English College at Rome
  - Miguel Payá y Rico, Santiago de Compostela
  - Louis-Marie Caverot, Lyon
  - Luigi di Canossa, Verona
  - Luigi Serafini, Viterbo
  - Josip Mihalovic, Zagreb
  - Johann Rudolf Kutschker, Archbishop of Vienna, Austria-Hungary
  - Lucido Parocchi, Bologna
  - Vincenzo Moretti, Ravenna
  - Antonio Pellegrini, Cardinal-Deacon of Santa Maria in Aquiro
  - Prospero Caterini, Protodeacon, Secretary of the Inquisition.
  - Teodolfo Mertel, Prefect of the Apostolic Signatura; the last cardinal to not be ordained to the priesthood
  - Domenico Consolini, Prefect of the Pontifical Roman Seminary of Sts. Peter and Paul for the Foreign Missions
  - Edoardo Borromeo, President of the Fabric of Saint Peter
  - Lorenzo Ilarione Randi, Vice-Camerlengo of the Apostolic Camera
  - Bartolomeo Pacca il Giovane, Cardinal-Deacon of Santa Maria in Campitelli
  - Lorenzo Nina, Prefect of the Congregation for Studies
  - Enea Sbarretti, Cardinal-Deacon of Santa Maria dei Martiri (the Pantheon)
  - Frédéric de Falloux du Coudray, Cardinal-Deacon of Sant'Agata de' Goti
