= Luigi Bilio =

Italian cardinal (1826–1884)

His Eminence Luigi Maria Bilio CRSP
- Major Penitentiary of the Apostolic Penitentiary
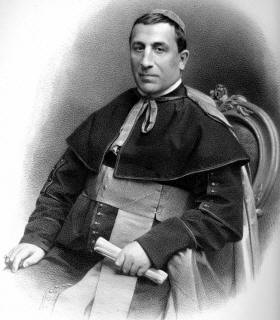
- Church: Roman Catholic Church
- Appointed: 18 October 1877
- Term ended: 30 January 1884
- Predecessor: Antonio Maria Panebianco
- Successor: Raffaele Monaco La Valletta
- Other posts: Cardinal-Bishop of Sabina (1873–84); Secretary of the Commission of Roman and Universal Inquisition (1883–84)
- Previous posts: Cardinal-Priest of San Lorenzo in Panisperna (1866–73); Prefect of the Congregation of Indulgences and Sacred Relics (1876); Prefect of the Congregation for Rites (1876–77)

Orders
- Ordination: 1849
- Consecration: 12 January 1874 by Pope Pius IX
- Created cardinal: 22 June 1866 by Pope Pius IX
- Rank: Cardinal-Priest (1866–73); Cardinal-Bishop (1873–84)

Personal details
- Born: Tommaso Francesco Bilio; 25 March 1826 Alessandria, Kingdom of Sardinia
- Died: 30 January 1884 (aged 57) Rome, Kingdom of Italy
- Buried: Campo Verano
- Parents: Giuseppe Bilio; Maddalena Barali

Styles of Luigi Bilio
- Reference style: His Eminence
- Spoken style: Your Eminence
- Informal style: Cardinal
- See: Sabina (suburbicarian see)

Luigi Maria Bilio CRSP (25 March 1826 – 30 January 1884), was a Cardinal of the Roman Catholic Church who, among other offices, was Secretary of the Supreme Sacred Congregation of the Holy Office.

== Life ==
Bilio was born in Alessandria, Piedmont, Italy. He joined the Clerics Regular of Saint Paul (Barnabites) when he was 14 years old and professed religious vows in Genoa in 1842. He was ordained in 1849 in Vercelli.

After his ordination, Bilio served as a professor of Greek and philosophy at the Collegio Ducale in Parma; and in Naples. He was a professor of philosophy, theology and canon law in Rome. He was elected Assistant Superior General of his Order. Bilio later worked as a consultor to the Congregation of the Inquisition from 1864 and for the Congregation of the Index from 1865. He had an important role in the preparation of the Syllabus of Errors and of the encyclical Quanta cura of Pope Pius IX.

== Cardinalate ==
Bilio was created Cardinal-Priest of San Lorenzo in Panisperna by Pope Pius IX in the consistory of 22 June 1866. He participated in the First Vatican Council from 1869 until 1870.

== Episcopate ==
Bilio was promoted to the rank of Cardinal Bishop, and the suburbicarian see of Sabina, on 22 December 1873. He was consecrated as a bishop on 12 January of the following year by Pope Pius IX. He was appointed as the Prefect of the Sacred Congregation of Rites on 20 December 1876.

Bilio was nominated for the papacy during the conclave of 1878 but received only a handful of votes. The conclave elected Gioachino Pecci, who took the papal throne as Pope Leo XIII. Bilio was soon appointed as Prefect of the Congregation for Indulgences and Sacred Relics by Pope Leo in 1878. Pope Leo also appointed him to serve as Apostolic Penitentiary on 18 October 1877, a position he held until his death. He also served as Secretary of the Holy Office from January 1883 until his death one year later.

Bilio died in January 1884, his body lay in state in the Church of Santi Biagio e Carlo ai Catinari in Rome and was buried in the crypt of his Order in the Campo Verano cemetery.

Catholic Church titles
Preceded by Giuseppe Milesi Pironi Ferretti	Cardinal-Bishop of Sabina; 22 December 1873 – 30 January 1884	Succeeded by Tommaso Martinelli
Preceded by Costantino Patrizi Naro	Prefect of the Sacred Congregation of Rites; 20 December 1876 – 30 March 1884	Succeeded by Tommaso Martinelli
Preceded by Antonio Maria Panebianco	Major Penitentiary of the Apostolic Penitentiary; 18 October 1877 – 30 January 1884	Succeeded by Raffaele Monaco La Valletta
Preceded by Antonio Maria Panebianco	Secretary of the Supreme Sacred Congregation of the Holy Office; 25 January 1883 – 30 January 1884	Succeeded by Raffaele Monaco La Valletta
