= Camillo di Pietro =

Italian cardinal (1806–1884)

His Eminence Camillo di Pietro
- Dean of the College of Cardinals
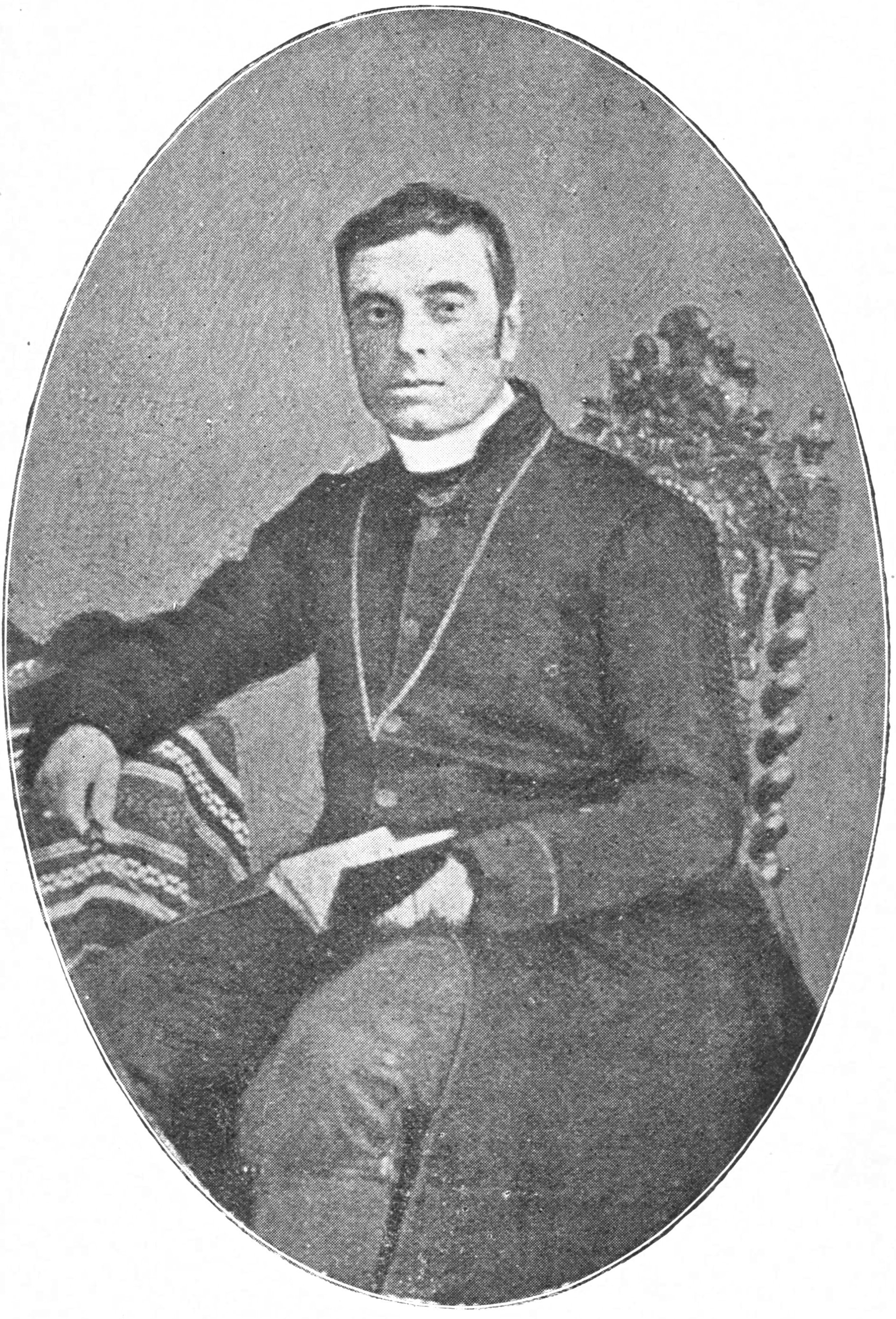
- The cardinal pictured in Historical accounts of Lisbon college.
- Church: Roman Catholic Church
- Appointed: 15 July 1878
- Term ended: 6 March 1884
- Predecessor: Luigi Amat di San Filippo e Sorso
- Successor: Carlo Sacconi
- Other posts: Camerlengo (1878–84); Cardinal-Bishop of Ostia-Velletri (1878–84)
- Previous posts: Titular Archbishop of Beirut (1839–56); Apostolic Nuncio to Portugal (1844–56); Cardinal-Priest of San Giovanni a Porta Latina (1959–67); Prefect of the Apostolic Signatura (1863–67); Camerlengo of the College of Cardinals (1866–67); Cardinal-Bishop of Albano (1867–77); Vice-Dean of the College of Cardinals (1877–78); Cardinal-Bishop of Porto e Santa Rufina (1877–78)

Orders
- Ordination: 16 June 1839
- Consecration: 14 July 1839 by Chiarissimo Falconieri Mellini
- Created cardinal: 19 December 1853 (in pectore); 16 June 1856 (revealed) by Pope Pius IX
- Rank: Cardinal-Priest (1859–67); Cardinal-Bishop (1867–84)

Personal details
- Born: Camillo di Pietro; 10 January 1806 Rome, Papal States
- Died: 6 March 1884 (aged 78) Rome, Kingdom of Italy
- Buried: Campo Verano
- Parents: Domenico di Pietro; Faustina Caetani
- Education: Collegio Romano; Seminario Romano

Camillo di Pietro (10 January 1806 – 6 March 1884) was an Papalini Catholic prelate who served as Camerlengo of the Sacred College of Cardinals and later Camerlengo of the Holy Roman Church. He was elevated to the cardinalate in 1853.

== Biography ==
Camillo di Pietro was born in Rome. His father's family was one of merchants of the countryside that became rich and entered the patriciate of Terni and Spoleto; his mother was from the Dukes of Sermoneta, who were eminent members of the Roman aristocracy and descendants of Pope Boniface VIII. He was the second of the four children of Domenico di Pietro and Faustina Caetani. He was a nephew of Michele di Pietro, who served as Cardinal and Latin Patriarch of Jerusalem.

He was educated at the Collegio Romano in Rome where he studied the humanities and philosophy. He entered the Seminario Romano where he studied theology and finally the Collegio di Protonotari Apostolici, Rome where he received a doctorate utroque iuris (in both canon and civil law) on 10 May 1829. He received the subdiaconate on 19 May 1839 and the diaconate on 2 June 1839.

He entered the priesthood as domestic prelate on 15 January 1829. He served as Prelate adjunct of the Congregation of the Tridentine Council from 1829 until 1832. He was created Protonotary apostolic. On 13 December 1830, he pronounced, before the cardinals gathered for the conclave, the oration for Pope Pius VIII. He was appointed as Apostolic delegate in Orvieto in 1832, and in Spoleto from 1834 until 1835. Pope Gregory XVI recalled him to Rome and named him Auditor of the Sacred Roman Rota on 6 April 1835. He was confirmed in his post by motu proprio of 27 April 1835. He took the oath on 16 November 1835 and entered the office on the following 23 November. He resigned the post on 19 August 1839. He was ordained to the priesthood on 16 June 1839.

He was appointed titular archbishop of Berut by Pope Gregory XVI on 8 July 1839. He served as Nuncio to the Kingdom of the Two Sicilies from 1839. He was appointed as Internuncio extraordinary and apostolic delegate to Portugal on 29 June 1844.

He was created Cardinal-Priest of San Giovanni a Porta Latina by Pope Pius IX in the consistory of 19 December 1853 and reserved in pectore. It was published in the consistory of 16 June 1856. He was appointed President of the Supreme Council of Public Affairs on 10 August 1859. He was appointed to the office of Prefect of the Supreme Tribunal of the Signatura on 29 August 1863 to 1867. Pope Pius appointed him as Camerlengo of the Sacred College of Cardinals on 8 January 1866. He opted for the order of cardinal bishops, taking the suburbicarian see of Albano on 20 September 1867. When the vacancy in the suburbicarian see of Porto-Santa-Rufina opened he took that see also on 12 March 1877. He was elected as Vice-dean of the Sacred College of Cardinals. He played an essential role in its organisation and obtained the necessary guarantees from the Italian government not to interfere with the conclave of 1878 when Pius IX died. It was the first conclave after the Holy See had lost the Papal States. He participated in the conclave of 1878 that elected Pope Leo XIII. Pope Leo appointed him as Camerlengo of the Holy Roman Church on 28 March 1878, and he held the post until his death. He opted for the suburbicarian see of Ostia on 15 July 1878 and thus was the Dean of the Sacred College of Cardinals. He died in Rome in 1884 and is buried in the Campo Verano cemetery.

Catholic Church titles
Preceded by Sisto Riario Sforza	Camerlengo of the Sacred College of Cardinals; 8 January 1866 – 22 February 1867	Succeeded by Karl-August von Reisach
Preceded by Giuseppe Milesi Pironi Ferretti	Cardinal-Bishop of Porto-Santa-Rufina; 12 March 1877–15 July 1878	Succeeded by Carlo Sacconi
Preceded by Gioacchino Pecci	Camerlengo of the Holy Roman Church; 28 March 1878–6 March 1884	Succeeded by Domenico Consolini
Preceded by Luigi Amat di San Filippo e Sorso	Cardinal-Bishop of Osta e Velletri and Dean of the College of Cardinals; 15 July 1878–6 March 1884	Succeeded by Carlo Sacconi
