= Morichini =

Morichini is an Italian surname. Notable people with the surname include:

- Domenico Morichini (1773–1836), Italian physician and scientist
- Carlo Luigi Morichini (1805–1879), Italian Cardinal
