= Domenico Consolini =

Italian bishop, diplomat and cardinal

His Eminence Domenico Consolini
- Camerlengo of the Apostolic Camera
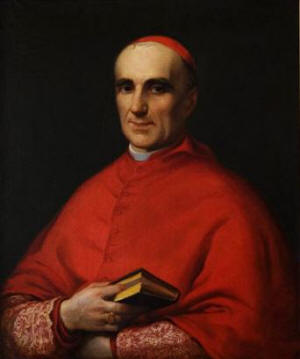
- Church: Roman Catholic Church
- Appointed: 24 March 1884
- Term ended: 20 December 1884
- Predecessor: Camillo di Pietro
- Successor: Luigi Oreglia di Santo Stefano
- Other posts: Cardinal-Deacon of Santa Maria in Domnica (1866–84); Protodeacon (1884)

Orders
- Created cardinal: 22 June 1866 by Pope Pius IX
- Rank: Cardinal-Deacon

Personal details
- Born: Domenico Antonio Luigi Pacifico Nicola Baldassare Consolini; 7 June 1806 Senigallia, Papal States
- Died: 20 December 1884 (aged 78) Rome, Kingdom of Italy
- Parents: Pietro Consolini; Angela Groppelli
- Education: Pontifical Academy of Ecclesiastical Nobles

Domenico Antonio Luigi Pacifico Nicola Baldassare Consolini (7 June 1806 – 20 December 1884) was an Italian bishop and cardinal, who served as a diplomat of the Holy See.

== Life ==
Born in Senigallia, he was the fourth son of Marchese Tommaso Consolini and Angela Grapelli. He studied first in his native city and later at the Pontifical Academy of Ecclesiastical Nobles in Rome, starting his service in the Roman Curia. He was named a domestic prelate of the Apostolic Palace, and an official of the Sacred Congregation of Good Administration. This was followed by assignment to the Sacred Congregation of the Council, which was responsible for interpreting and enforcing the decrees of the Council of Trent.

Consolini was named a bishop, receiving consecration in Rome, on 20 December 1832. He was the last Catholic to be created a bishop without first being ordained as a priest. In 1835 he was named Apostolic delegate to the Duchy of Camerino, followed by serving in the same office for the Marche of Fermo.

Appointed cardinal by Pope Pius IX during the consistory of 22 June 1866, Consolini received the red hat and was named Cardinal Deacon, with his titular church being the Church of Santa Maria in Domnica. After this He was a Council Father at the First Vatican Council. Cardinal Prefect of the Propaganda Fide, in which he served for the next ten years. In 1874 he was also appointed a Prefect of the Pontifical Roman Seminary of Sts. Peter and Paul for the Foreign Missions, a new society of priests of the Diocese of Rome who wished to serve overseas in Asia and Africa. He participated in the conclave of 1878 which elected Pope Leo XIII.

Consolini was Camerlengo of the Catholic Church from 24 March 1884 until his death nine months later.

After his death, Consolini's body was exposed at the Basilica of Sant'Eustachio, being buried temporarily in the Campo Verano cemetery in Rome. Later, his relatives took his remains back to Senigallia, where they were reburied at the local Cimitero delle Grazie.

Catholic Church titles
Preceded by Camillo di Pietro	Camerlengo of the Holy Roman Church; 1884	Succeeded by Luigi Oreglia di Santo Stefano
Preceded by Teodolfo Mertel	Cardinal Protodeacon; 1884	Succeeded by Lorenzo Ilarione Randi
