= Luigi Jacobini =

Italian Roman Catholic Cardinal

His Eminence Luigi Jacobini
- Cardinal Secretary of State
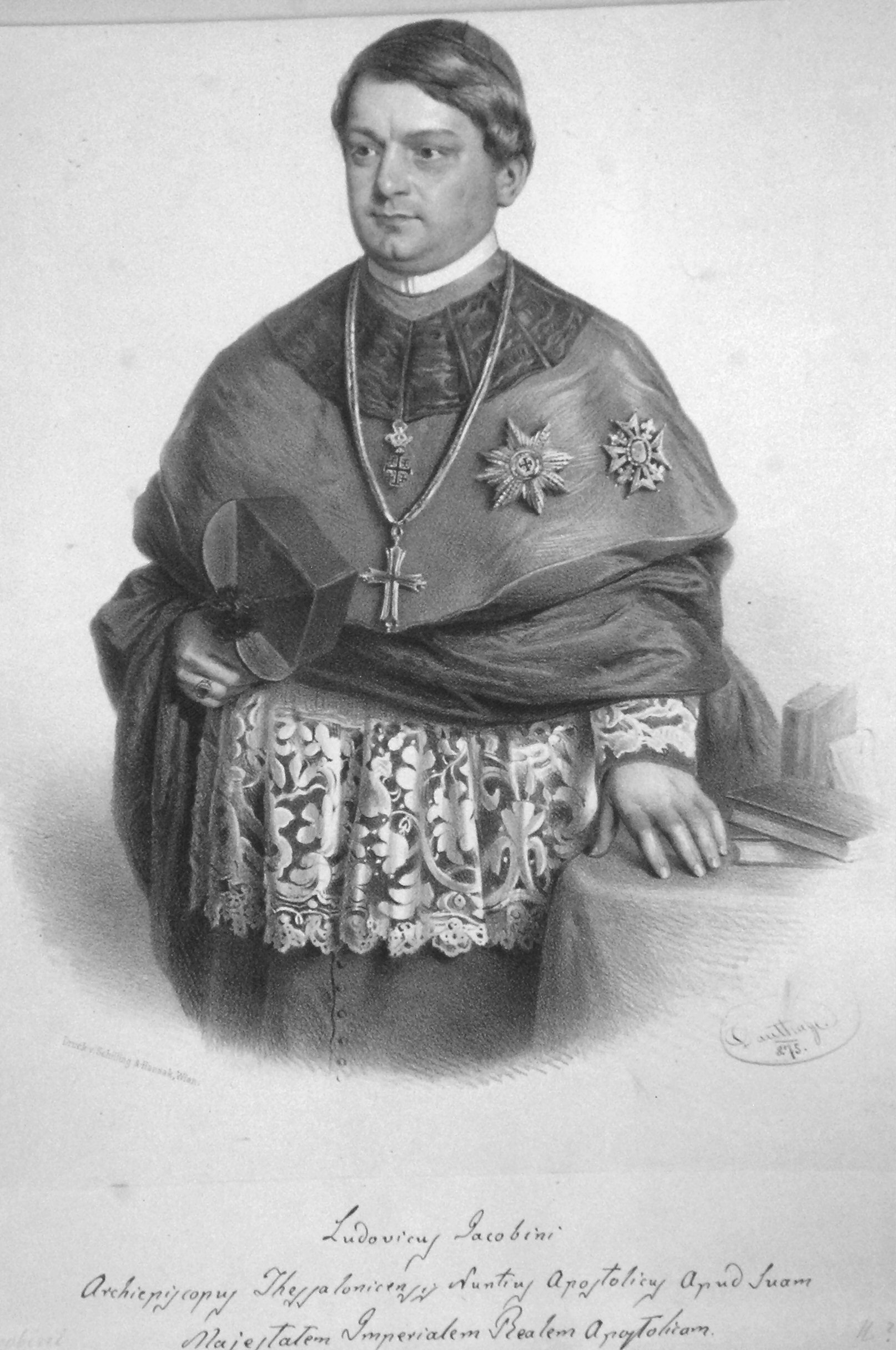
- Lithograph (1875).
- Church: Roman Catholic Church
- Appointed: 16 December 1880
- Term ended: 28 February 1887
- Predecessor: Lorenzo Nina
- Successor: Mariano Rampolla del Tindaro
- Other post: Cardinal-Priest of Santa Maria della Vittoria (1880-87)
- Previous posts: Titular Archbishop of Thessalonica (1874-79); Apostolic Nuncio to Austria-Hungary (1874-79)

Orders
- Ordination: 23 September 1854
- Consecration: 25 March 1874 by Costantino Patrizi Naro
- Created cardinal: 19 September 1879 by Pope Leo XIII
- Rank: Cardinal-Priest

Personal details
- Born: Luigi Jacobini; 6 January 1832 Genzano, Papal States
- Died: 28 February 1887 (aged 55) Rome, Kingdom of Italy
- Buried: Campo Verano
- Parents: Andrea Raimondo Jacobini; Ottavia Jacobini
- Education: Sapienza University of Rome
- Coat of arms

Luigi Jacobini (6 January 1832 – 28 February 1887) was an Italian Cardinal of the Roman Catholic Church who served as Vatican Secretary of State from 1880 until his death; he was elevated to the rank of cardinal in 1879.

== Biography ==
Styles of Luigi Jacobini
- Reference style: His Eminence
- Spoken style: Your Eminence
- Religious style: Cardinal
- Informal style: Cardinal
- See: Thessaloni

Born in Genzano, Lodovico Jacobini studied at the seminary in Albano before being ordained to the priesthood in Rome on 23 September 1854. He then furthered his studies at the Sapienza University in Rome, where he obtained his doctorate in theology (20 July 1857) and his doctorate in civil and canon law (25 June 1858). Jacobini then entered the Roman Curia, serving as a staff member in the Secretariat of Ecclesiastical Affairs. He was raised to the rank of Domestic Prelate of His Holiness, and also became Secretary of the Congregations of Propaganda Fide, which at that times also was responsible for relations with Oriental Rites.

In 1862, he was appointed secretary to the first commission for the preparation of the Syllabus. Later named a canon of the Lateran Basilica, Jacobini served as a referendary on the Apostolic Signatura as well. In 1867, he was charged with the weighty task of gathering and publishing the answers of the world's bishops to the questionnaire for the preparation of the First Vatican Council. During the council, Jacobini was secretary of the preparatory commission for Church discipline, also serving as Undersecretary of the council from 1869 to 1870.

On 20 March 1874, Jacobini was appointed Titular Archbishop of Thessalonica by Pope Pius IX. He received his episcopal consecration on the following 24 March from Cardinal Costantino Patrizi Naro. He was named Nuncio to Austria three days later, on 27 March 1874. Pope Leo XIII created Jacobini Cardinal-Priest of S Maria della Vittoria in the consistory of 19 September 1879. He was decorated with the Grand Cross of the Austrian Order of Sankt Stefan in 1880. On 16 December of that same year, Jacobini was appointed Vatican Secretary of State (essentially the Pope's prime minister) and Administrator of the Wealth of the Holy See.

He died in Rome, at age 55, from an illness that had lasted nearly two years. He was buried on 6 March 1887, he is buried in the chapel of the Congregation of Propagation of the Faith in the Campo Verano cemetery.

He cousin Angelo Jacobini (1825–1886) was also a cardinal.

== Honours ==
- (Hawaiian Kingdom) Knight Grand Cross of the Royal Order of Kalākaua I, 1881

Catholic Church titles
Preceded by Mariano Falcinelli Antoniacci, OSB	Nuncio to Austria; 27 March 1874 – 16 December 1880	Succeeded by Serafino Vannutelli
Preceded by Lorenzo Nina	Secretary of State; 16 December 1880 – 28 February 1887	Succeeded by Mariano Rampolla
