= Antonio Trasmondi =

Italian physician (1771 - 1834)

Baron Antonio Trasmondi or Trasmondo (1771 - 1834) was an Italian medical doctor active in Rome.

He was born in Rome and studied at the Sapienza University, graduating in medicine. He began practicing as a preceptor at the Arcispedale of Santa Maria della Consolazione in Rome. He was nominated as teacher of anatomy for the hospital of San Gallicano in Trastevere. In 1809, Pope Pius VII named him professor; in 1815 he became supernumerary professor of the institute of theoretical and forensic external medicine. He was also the major health official for the papal militias. In 1822 he became director general in the pontifical militias, with an appointment as lieutenant coronel. In 1834, he was awarded a bronze medal for his teaching capacities and a gold medal for his work in public health.

When Pope Leo XII created a consultative commission, Trasmondi was chosen as one of the councillors. Leo also named him to the College of the archiaters of the Sapienza, and knighted him. At the death of Giacomo Sisco, por Pius VIII assigned him the formers clinical professorship.

He established friendships with the surgeon Vacca-Beringhieri, the anatomist Scarpa, Pessuti, the physician-chemist Morichini, Bomba and Lupi. Trasmondi died in Rome.

Bellini roe a large obituary and elogio in the Diario di Roma 26 February 1834.

He gained fame in 1833 as one to conclude after anatomic inspection that the bones found in Santa Maria as Martyres (the Pantheon), uncovered on September 14, 1833, belonged to Raphael Sanzio. The exhumation was performed in the presence of Gaspare Servi, Vincenzo Cammuccini, and Carlo Fea. Among his observations was a roughening of his thumb bone, said to be characteristic of painters. Previously a skull preserved in the Academy of St Luke was presumed to be Raphael.

== Bibliography ==
- Elementi di esterna medicina, Volume 1, By Antonio Trasmondo (1835).
- Ad Antonio Trasmondo lettera del dott. Andrea cav. Belli ... lettore di chirurgia e casi pratici nel ven. Arcispedale di S. Maria della consolazione intorno alla guarigione di quattro mortali malattie che fra le altre si curavano nel suddetto Arcispedale dal giorno 15 di maggio 1833 a tutto il mese di dicembre dell'anno stesso by Andrea Belli (1834).
