= Lorenzo Nina =

Italian prelate (1812–1885)

His Eminence Lorenzo Nina
- Prefect of the Congregation of the Council
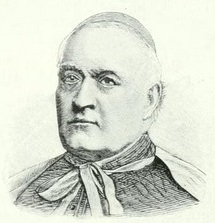
- Church: Roman Catholic Church
- Appointed: 7 November 1881
- Term ended: 25 July 1885
- Predecessor: Prospero Caterini
- Successor: Luigi Serafini
- Other post: Cardinal-Priest of Santa Maria in Trastevere (1879-85)
- Previous posts: Cardinal-Deacon of Sant'Angelo in Pescheria (1877-7); Prefect of the Congregation of Studies (1877-78); Prefect of the Apostolic Palaces (1878-80); Secretary of State (1878-80)

Orders
- Ordination: December 1835
- Created cardinal: 12 March 1877 by Pope Pius IX
- Rank: Cardinal-Deacon (1877-79); Cardinal-Priest (1879-85)

Personal details
- Born: Lorenzo Nina; 12 May 1812 Recanati, Papal States
- Died: 25 July 1885 (aged 73) Rome, Kingdom of Italy
- Buried: Campo Verano
- Education: Pontifical Roman Athenaeum Saint Apollinare; Sapienza University of Rome
- Coat of arms

Styles of Lorenzo Nina
- Reference style: His Eminence
- Spoken style: Your Eminence
- Religious style: Cardinal
- Informal style: Cardinal
- See: none

Lorenzo Nina (May 12, 1812 – July 25, 1885) was an Italian prelate of the Roman Catholic Church. A longtime member of the Roman Curia, he served as Prefect of the Congregation for Studies (1877–1878), Secretary of State of the Holy See (1878–1880), and Prefect of the Congregation of the Council (1881–1885). He was elevated to the cardinalate in 1877.

== Biography ==
Lorenzo Nina was born in Recanati; his father was a notary. After studying philosophy and theology at the seminary of Recanati, he settled in Rome with an uncle who was a canon and pastor of San Lorenzo in Damaso. He then studied at the Pontifical Roman Seminary and at La Sapienza University, from where he obtained doctorates in theology and in canon and civil law.

Nina was ordained to the priesthood in December 1834, and then served as secretary to Msgr. Giovanni di Pietro, an auditor of the Roman Rota. He was also a counselor to Luigi Amat di San Filippo e Sorso. In 1853, he became an honorary professor at the Faculty of Law of the Roman Seminary. Canon of the chapter of St. Peter's Basilica (1868), dean of the chapter of the Liberian Basilica, and prefect of the Pontifical Athenaeum S. Apollinare. From 1868 to 1877, he served as assessor of the Congregation of the Inquisition. He was a member of the preparatory commission for the First Vatican Council, and was prefect of studies at the Roman Seminary from 1875 to 1877.

Pope Pius IX created him Cardinal-Deacon of S. Angelo in Pescheria in the consistory of March 12, 1877. On the following March 26, he was named Prefect of Economy of the Congregation of Propaganda Fide and of the Reverend Chamber of Despoilments. He served as Prefect of the Congregation for Studies from October 19, 1877 to August 9, 1878, and participated in the 1878 papal conclave, which elected Pope Leo XIII.

Leo XIII later appointed Nina as Vatican Secretary of State, essentially the prime minister of the Pope, on August 9, 1878. He opted for the order of Cardinal Priests and was given the titular church of S. Maria in Trastevere on February 28, 1879. He was also decorated with the Grand Cross of the Austrian Order of Sankt Stefan in 1879. On December 16, 1880, Nina resigned as Secretary of State and was confirmed as Prefect of the Apostolic Palace. He became Prefect of the Congregation of the Council on November 7, 1881, remaining in that position until his death.

The Cardinal later died in Rome, at age 73. He is buried in the Campo Verano cemetery.

Catholic Church titles
Preceded by Annibale Capalti	Prefect of the Congregation for Studies; 19 October 1877 – 9 August 1878	Succeeded by Antonio Saverio De Luca
Preceded by Alessandro Franchi	Vatican Secretary of State; 9 August 1878 – 16 December 1880	Succeeded by Luigi Jacobini
Preceded by Prospero Caterini	Prefect of the Congregation of the Council; 7 November 1881 – 25 July 1885	Succeeded by Luigi Serafini
