= Flavio Chigi (1810–1885) =

Italian Catholic cardinal (1810–1885)

- Archpriest of the Lateran Basilica
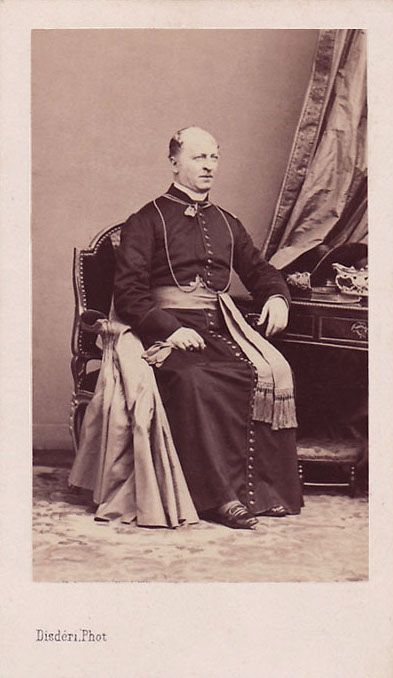
- Flavio Chigi III (1810-1885), Papal ambassador in France, photo by André-Adolphe-Eugène Disdéri
- Church: Catholic Church
- See: Archbasilica of Saint John Lateran
- In office: 24 December 1876 – 15 February 1885
- Predecessor: Costantino Patrizi Naro
- Successor: Raffaele Monaco La Valletta
- Other post: Cardinal-Priest of Santa Maria del Popolo (1874-1885)
- Previous posts: Titular Archbishop of Myra (1856-1874); Apostolic Nuncio to France (1861-1873); Apostolic Nuncio to Bavaria (1856-1861)

Orders
- Ordination: 17 December 1853
- Consecration: 6 July 1856 by Pope Pius IX
- Created cardinal: 22 December 1873 by Pope Pius IX

Personal details
- Born: 31 May 1810 Rome, Department of Rome, French Empire
- Died: 15 February 1885 (aged 74) Rome, Kingdom of Italy

Flavio Chigi (Rome, 31 May 1810 – Rome, 15 February 1885) was an Italian Catholic Cardinal, Archbishop and Nuncio.

== Biography ==
Son of Agostino Chigi and Amalia Carlotta Barberini Colonna di Sciarra, Flavio Chigi belonged to the noble Roman Chigi family originating from Siena, which included among its illustrious ancestors: Pope Alexander VII, and several cardinals such as two of his namesakes Flavio Chigi (1631–1693), Flavio Chigi (1711–1771) and Sigismondo Chigi.

He studied with private tutors and later studied theology with the Jesuits in Tivoli.
Initially initiated into a military career, he was enrolled in the Papal Noble Guard until 1848 and then ordained a priest on 17 December 1853 and became a canon of St. Peter's Basilica in the Vatican, acquiring the title of Secret chamberlain of His Holiness.

On 19 June 1856 he was appointed Titular archbishop of Myra. He received episcopal consecration on 6 July of the same year from Pope Pius IX in the Pauline Chapel of the Quirinal Palace in Rome, assisted by Alessandro Macioti, titular archbishop of Colossae, assessor of the Supreme Sacred Congregation of the Holy Office, and by Giuseppe Palermo, O.S.A., titular bishop of Porphyreon, Papal Sacristan.

From 1856 to 1861 he was Apostolic Nuncio to Bavaria and from 1861 to 1873 he was Apostolic Nuncio to France. In the same year, on 12 November, he became assistant to the Papal Throne.

During his nunciature in Bavaria he was also charged with administering the Apostolic Vicariate of Anhalt. It was he who organized the territory of this small Apostolic vicariate into four parishes.

Pope Pius IX elevated him to the rank of Cardinal in the consistory of 22 December 1873 and on 15 June 1874 he received the Titular church of Santa Maria del Popolo.

He became Grand Prior of Rome of the Sovereign Military Order of Malta from 21 December 1876 and shortly after, thanks to him, the association of Italian Knights of the Sovereign Military Order of Malta was founded in Rome, of which his nephew Mario Chigi Albani della Rovere, VII Prince of Farnese, was the first president from 1877 to 1914.

In the same period he became Archpriest of the Basilica of Saint John Lateran. He took part in the Conclave of 1878 that elected Pope Leo XIII and in 1881 he became Camerlengo of the Sacred College from 13 May 1881 to 27 March 1882. Secretary of the Memorials from 10 November 1881, he became Secretary of the Apostolic Briefs on 24 March 1884 and then Grand chancellor of the Pontifical Equestrian Orders.

He died in Rome on 15 February 1885 and was laid to rest in his titular church of Santa Maria del Popolo in the capital. His body was temporarily buried in the Verano Cemetery, a burial which later became permanent.
