= Fabio Maria Asquini =

His Eminence Fabio Maria Asquini
- Cardinal-Priest of San Lorenzo in Lucina
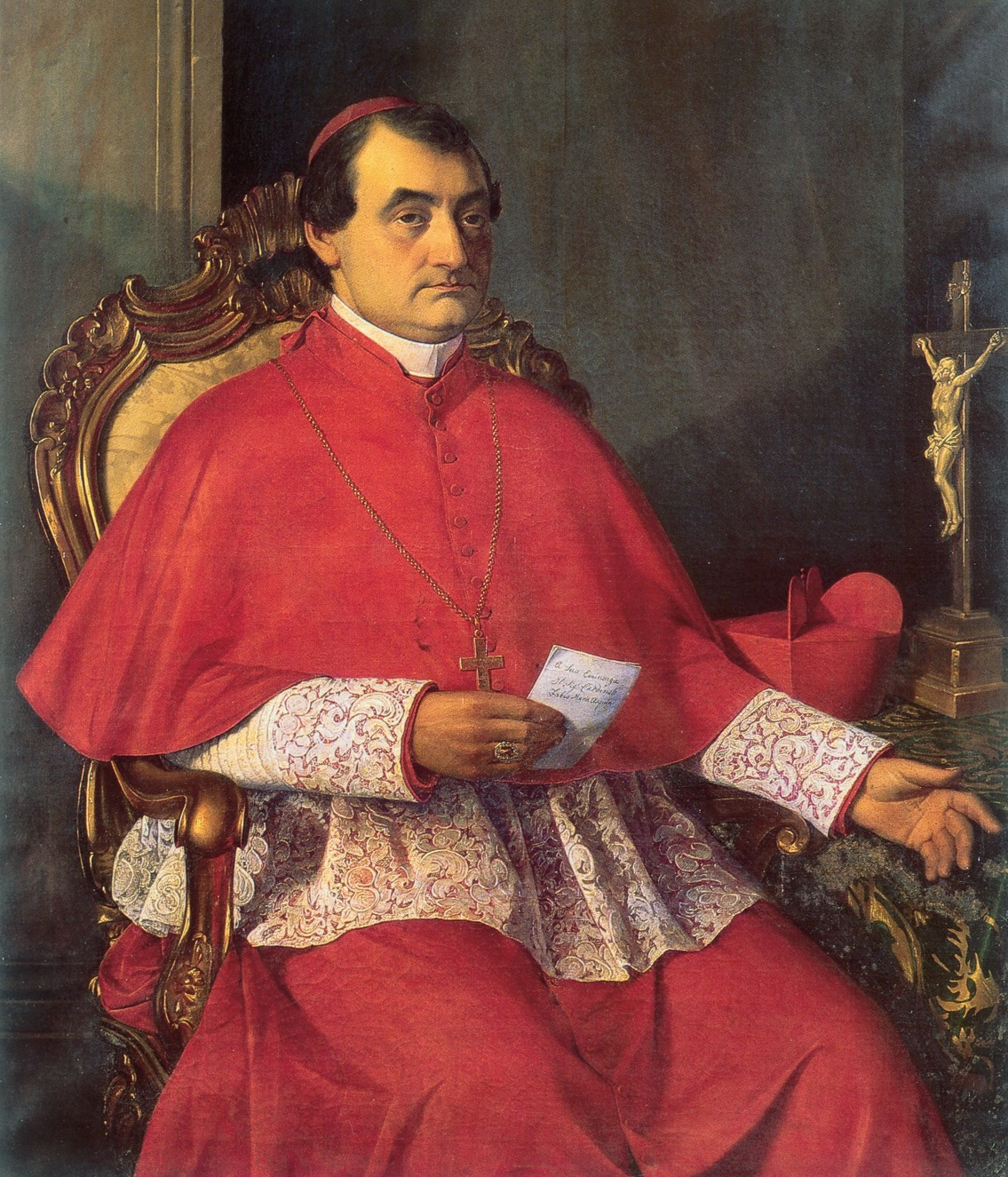
- Portrait.
- Church: Roman Catholic Church
- Appointed: 21 September 1877
- Term ended: 22 December 1878
- Predecessor: Filippo de Angelis
- Successor: Domenico Carafa della Spina di Traetto
- Previous posts: Titular Archbishop of Tarsus (1837–44); Latin Patriarch of Constantinople (1844–45); Cardinal-Priest of Santo Stefano al Monte Celio (1845–77); Prefect of the Congregation of Indulgences and Sacred Relics (1847–63); Camerlengo of the College of Cardinals (1862–63)

Orders
- Ordination: 26 February 1825
- Consecration: 8 October 1837 by Carlo Odescalchi
- Created cardinal: 22 January 1844 (in pectore); 21 April 1845 (revealed) by Pope Gregory XVI
- Rank: Cardinal-Priest

Personal details
- Born: Fabio Maria Asquini; 14 August 1802 Fagagna, Udine, Venetian Province
- Died: 22 December 1878 (aged 76) Rome, Kingdom of Italy
- Education: Collegio Romano; La Sapienza University

Fabio Maria Asquini (14 August 1802 – 22 December 1878) was a Cardinal of the Roman Catholic Church, Prefect of the Sacred Congregation of Indulgences and Sacred Relics and Camerlengo of the Sacred College of Cardinals. He was born on 14 August 1802 in Fagagna.

== Early life and priesthood ==
Asquini was educated at the Collegio Ghislieri then the Collegio Romano (where he received a Doctorate of Theology) and finally the La Sapienza University where he studied law. He was ordained on 26 February 1825 and was appointed as a domestic prelate to the Pope. He was elected Titular Latin patriarch of Antioch in 1837 and was consecrated by Carlo Cardinal Odescalchi.

== Cardinalate ==
He was elevated to Cardinal in pectore on 22 January 1844 and was appointed Latin Patriarch of Constantinople, a position he held until 1851. He was officially revealed as a Cardinal on 21 April 1845. On 24 April, he was appointed Cardinal-Priest of St Stefano al Monte Celio where he served for almost 33 years until 1877.

In 1847 Asquini was named Prefect of the Sacred Congregation of Indulgences and Sacred Relics and between 1862 and 1863 he was appointed Camerlengo of the Sacred College of Cardinals. Asquini participated in both the 1846 Papal Conclave and the 1878 Papal Conclave as well as the First Vatican Council. Finally, in 1877 he was appointed Cardinal-Priest of San Lorenzo in Lucina where he served until his death in 1878.

Catholic Church titles
Preceded by Giovanni Soglia Ceroni	Latin Patriarch of Constantinople; 1844–1851	Succeeded by Dominicus Lucciardi
Preceded by Gaspare Bernardo Pianetti	Camerlengo of the Sacred College of Cardinals; 1862–1863	Succeeded by Niccola Paracciani Clarelli
