= Giuseppe Milesi Pironi Ferretti =

Italian Catholic cardinal and politician

His Eminence Giuseppe Milesi Pironi Ferretti
- Cardinal-Bishop of Sabina
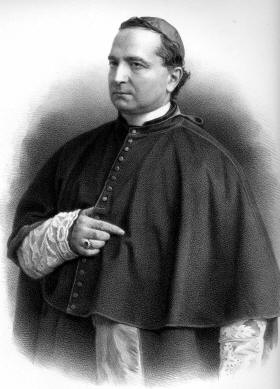
- Church: Roman Catholic Church
- Appointed: 21 March 1870
- Term ended: 2 August 1873
- Predecessor: Luigi Bilio
- Successor: Karl August Graf von Reisach
- Previous posts: Cardinal-Priest of Santa Maria in Ara Coeli (1858–70); Camerlengo of the College of Cardinals (1869–70)

Orders
- Ordination: 1842
- Consecration: 3 April 1870 by Costantino Patrizi Naro
- Created cardinal: 15 March 1858 by Pope Pius IX
- Rank: Cardinal-Priest (1858–70); Cardinal-Bishop (1870–73)

Personal details
- Born: Giuseppe Milesi Pironi Ferretti; 9 March 1817 Ancona, Papal States
- Died: 2 August 1873 (aged 56) Rome, Papal States
- Buried: Campo Verano
- Parents: Francesco Milesi Pironi Ferretti; Laura Strina
- Education: Pontifical Academy of Ecclesiastical Nobles; La Sapienza University

Giuseppe Milesi Pironi Ferretti (9 March 1817 – 2 August 1873) was an Italian Catholic cardinal and politician of the Holy See.

== Early life and career ==
Ferretti was born on 9 March 1817 in Ancona and was educated there until he joined the Pontifical Academy of Ecclesiastical Nobles. He was ordained in 1842.

He was appointed Catholic Church governor of Ascoli, then Civitavecchia and finally Macerata. He served as pro-legate in both Urbino and Forlì until his appointment as minister of Commerce, Fine Arts and Public Works of the Papal States in 1854.

== Cardinalate ==
Ferretti was elevated to cardinal on 15 March 1858 and served as cardinal at the Basilica of Santa Maria in Aracoeli from his elevation to his appointment as cardinal-bishop.

He was promoted to the position of "president of the Supreme Council of Commerce and Public Works". He served as camerlengo of the Sacred College of Cardinals from 1869 to 1870 and participated in the First Vatican Council.

He served as cardinal bishop of Sabina and bishop of Porto-Santa Rufina from 1870 until his death in 1873.

Catholic Church titles
Preceded by Francesco Gaude	Cardinal-Priest of Santa Maria in Aracoeli; 1858–1870	Succeeded by Maximilian Joseph von Tarnóczy
Preceded by Karl-August von Reisach	Cardinal Bishop of Sabina; 1870–1873	Succeeded by Luigi Bilio
Preceded by Alessandro Barnabò	Camerlengo of the Sacred College of Cardinals; 1869–1870	Succeeded by Pietro de Silvestri
