= Antonio Maria Panebianco =

Italian prelate of the Catholic Church (1808–1885)

His Eminence Antonio Maria Panebianco O.F.M. Conv.
- Cardinal-Priest of Santi XII Apostoli
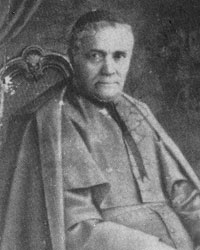
- Church: Roman Catholic Church
- Appointed: 23 December 1861
- Term ended: 21 November 1885
- Predecessor: Giusto Recanati
- Successor: José Sebastião de Almeida Neto
- Previous posts: Cardinal-Priest of San Girolamo dei Croati (1861); Prefect of the Congregation of Indulgences and Sacred Relics (1863-67); Major Penitentiary of the Apostolic Penitentiary (1867-77); Camerlengo of the College of Cardinals (1872-73); Secretary of the Commission of Roman and Universal Inquisition (1882-83)

Orders
- Ordination: 1 July 1832
- Created cardinal: 27 September 1861 by Pope Pius IX
- Rank: Cardinal-Priest

Personal details
- Born: Niccolò Panebianco; 13 August 1808 Terranova, Kingdom of Sicily
- Died: 21 November 1885 (aged 77) Rome, Kingdom of Italy
- Buried: Campo Verano
- Parents: Gaetano Panebianco; Santa Solito
- Education: Pontifical University of Saint Bonaventure

Antonio Maria Panebianco O.F.M. Conv. (13 August 1808 – 21 November 1885) was an Italian prelate of the Catholic Church. He became cardinal in 1861 and held several senior positions in the Roman Curia.

== Biography ==
Niccolò Panebianco was born on 13 August 1808 in Terranova, Sicily. He joined the Order of Friars Minor Conventual in Catania on 2 July 1823, taking the names Antonio Maria. He entered their novitiate in 1828 and took his vows in 1829, having waited until he was 21 years old as the law then required. The date of his ordination is unknown but he was a priest by the middle of 1832.

He studied at the Collegio San Bonaventura from 1834 to 1836, earning a doctorate in theology.

In the decade that followed he held positions of increasing responsibility within his order and by 1851 was Provincial for Ireland. On 9 June 1851 he was elected Socius and Assistant General of the Conventual Franciscans and a year later the Provincial for Sicily and Malta. On 20 July 1853 he was named a consultor to the Holy Office.

In 1858 he accompanied the Apostolic Nuncio to the Austro-Hungarian Empire Antonio Saverio De Luca on a successful mission to resolve a dispute over interreligious marriages in Transylvania, a notably multi-religious society. Probably based on his role in that diplomatic mission, on 30 September 1861 Pope Pius IX made him Cardinal-Priest of San Girolamo dei Croati, one of the Austrian churches of Rome. Pope Pius modified that to Santi XII Apostoli, which adjoins the headquarters of the Conventuals, on 23 December of that year. On 23 April 1863 he was named Prefect of the Congregation for Indulgences and Sacred Relics.

On 17 January 1867 he was appointed Major Penitentiary of the Apostolic Penitentiary. He was a member of the organizing commission for the First Vatican Council and participated in that Council's sessions in 1869–70. He declined an appointment as Camerlengo of the Holy Roman Church, perhaps because it would make his election to the papacy unlikely.

Reports of his character as a churchman differ widely with views of his politics. One near contemporary reported that he was viewed negatively in Rome: "People attributed to him the character of an avaricious, ignorant, truculent man, bent on carrying out the retrograde of Pope Pius XI, and on perpetuating the war between the Church and civil society." Writing in 1872, a British diplomat said he would be the candidate of "the Bourbon and Legitimist party", a favorite of Pope Pius IX though not the Pope's choice to succeed him. He was also described as "an Ultramontane Infallibilist", that is, a rigorous proponent of the rights of monarchs and the papacy. At the time of the 1878 conclave, the New York Times said he was a "monk of very austere habits and very decided principles, ...a man who lives like the ancient cenobites, fasting incessantly, ...said to be of a very energetic character" who "would probably be a fighting pope".

He participated in the conclave that elected Pope Leo XIII on 20 February 1878. He resigned his position as Apostolic Penitentiary on 15 October 1878. On 30 March 1882, Pope Leo named him Secretary of the Congregation of the Universal Inquisition, a position he resigned on 25 January 1883.

He died in Rome on 21 November 1885.
