= Raffaele Monaco La Valletta =

Italian Roman Catholic cardinal (1827–1896)

His Eminence Raffaele Monaco La Valletta
- Secretary of the Congregation of the Holy Office
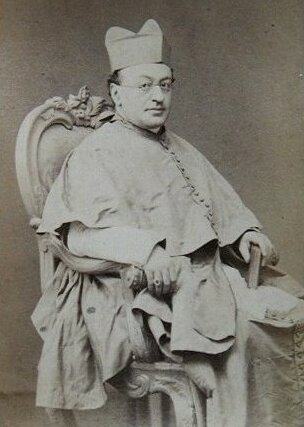
- Church: Roman Catholic Church
- Appointed: 15 February 1884
- Term ended: 14 July 1896
- Predecessor: Luigi Bilio
- Successor: Lucido Maria Parocchi
- Other posts: Cardinal Protector of the Pontifical Ecclesiastical Academy (1884–96); Major Penitentiary of the Apostolic Penitentiary (1884–96); Archpriest of the Basilica of Saint John Lateran (1885–96); Cardinal-Bishop of Ostia-Velletri (1889–96); Dean of the College of Cardinals (1889–96); Prefect of the Congregation of Ceremonies (1889–96)
- Previous posts: Asessor of the Commission of Roman and Universal Inquisition (1859–68); Cardinal-Priest of Santa Croce in Gerusalemme (1868–84); Abbot Ordinary of Subiaco (1873–84); Titular Archbishop of Heraclea in Europa (1874); Vicar General of Rome (1876–80); Camerlengo of the College of Cardinals (1880–81); Cardinal-Bishop of Albano (1884–89)

Orders
- Ordination: 22 September 1849 by Pope Pius IX
- Consecration: 12 January 1874 by Pope Pius IX
- Created cardinal: 13 March 1868 by Pope Pius IX
- Rank: Cardinal-Priest (1868–84); Cardinal-Bishop (1884–96)

Personal details
- Born: Raffaele Monaco La Valletta; 23 February 1827 L'Aquila, Papal States
- Died: 14 July 1896 (aged 69) Agerola, Kingdom of Italy
- Education: Collegio Romano; Sapienza University of Rome; Pontifical Ecclesiastical Academy

Styles of Raffaele Monaco La Valletta
- Reference style: His Eminence
- Spoken style: Your Eminence
- Informal style: Cardinal
- See: Albano Ostia (suburbicarian see)

Raffaele Monaco La Valletta S.T.D. J.U.D. (23 February 1827 – 14 July 1896) was a Cardinal of the Roman Catholic Church who served as Secretary of the Supreme Sacred Congregation of the Holy Office.

== Education ==
Monaco La Valletta was born in L'Aquila and was of a family from Chieti. He was educated at the Collegio Romano where he earned a doctorate in theology. He continued his studies at the La Sapienza University, Rome, where he earned a doctorate utriusque iuris (in both canon and civil law). He ended his studies at the Pontifical Academy of Ecclesiastical Nobles in 1846.

== Priesthood ==
He was ordained in 1849. He was created Protonotary apostolic supernumerary in 1858. He worked as Pro-assessor for the Supreme Sacred Congregation of the Holy Office from 1859.

== Cardinalate ==
He was created and proclaimed Cardinal-Priest of Santa Croce in Gerusalemme by Pope Pius IX in the consistory of 13 March 1868. He participated in the First Vatican Council from 1869-1870.

== Episcopate ==
He was appointed titular archbishop of Eraclea on 9 January 1874 and consecrated by Pope Pius IX himself. He was appointed Vicar General of Rome by Pope Pius on 21 December 1876. He participated in the conclave of 1878 that elected Pope Leo XIII.

On 21 December 1878 he ordained Giacomo della Chiesa, who was to become Pope Benedict XV, and on 20 December 1879 he ordained Ambrogio Achille Ratti, who succeeded Benedict XV as Pope Pius XI.

He was appointed Camerlengo of the Sacred College of Cardinals by Pope Leo in 1880. He served as Major Penitentiary of the Apostolic Penitentiary, dispensing indulgences from 12 February 1884 until his death. He was also appointed to the office of Secretary of the Supreme Sacred Congregation of the Holy Office, guarding the orthodoxy of Church doctrine from 1884 until his death.

He was elected to the order of bishops and the suburbicarian see of Albano on 24 March 1884. He was elected to the suburbicarian see of Ostia on 24 May 1889 and thus became Dean of the Sacred College of Cardinals. He died in 1896 in Agerola.

Catholic Church titles
Preceded by Edoardo Borromeo	Camerlengo of the Sacred College of Cardinals; 27 February 1880 – 13 May 1881	Succeeded by Flavio Chigi
Preceded by Luigi Bilio	Major Penitentiary of the Apostolic Penitentiary; 12 February 1884 – 14 July 1896	Succeeded by Isidoro Verga
Preceded by Luigi Bilio	Secretary of the Supreme Sacred Congregation of the Holy Office; 15 February 1884 – 14 July 1896	Succeeded by Lucido Parocchi
Preceded by Gustav Adolf Hohenlohe	Cardinal-Bishop of Albano; 24 March 1884 – 14 July 1896	Succeeded by Lucido Parocchi
Preceded by Flavio Chigi	Archpriest of the Basilica of St. John Lateran; 24 March 1884 – 14 July 1896	Succeeded by Francesco Satolli
Preceded by Carlo Sacconi	Dean of the Sacred College of Cardinals; 24 May 1889 – 14 July 1896	Succeeded by Luigi Oreglia di Santo Stefano
