= Luigi Amat di San Filippo e Sorso =

Roman Catholic prelate

His Eminence Luigi Amat di San Filippo e Sorso
- Dean of the College of Cardinals
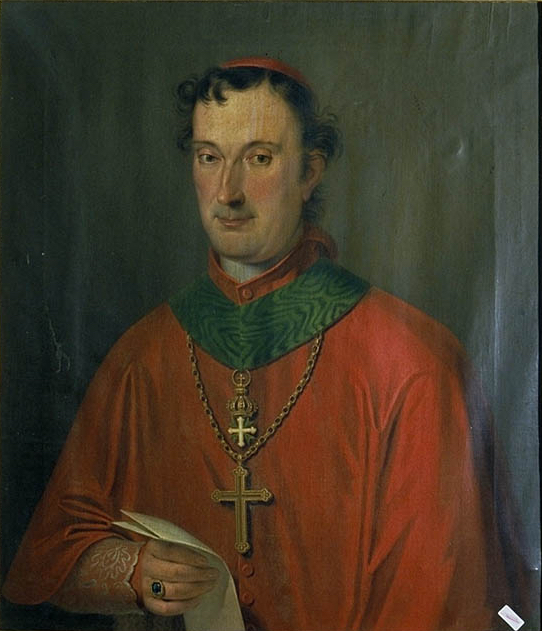
- Appointed: 12 March 1877
- Term ended: 30 March 1878
- Predecessor: Costantino Patrizi Naro
- Successor: Camillo di Pietro
- Other post: Cardinal-Bishop of Ostia
- Previous posts: Titular Archbishop of Nicea; Apostolic Nuncio to the Kingdom of the Two Sicilies; Apostolic Nuncio to Spain; Cardinal-Bishop of Palestrina; Cardinal-Bishop of Porto-Santa Rufina; Cardinal-Presbyter of San Lorenzo in Damaso; Cardinal-Presbyter of Santa Maria in Via

Orders
- Ordination: 24 December 1826
- Consecration: 22 April 1827
- Created cardinal: 19 May 1837 by Pope Gregory XVI
- Rank: Cardinal-Bishop

Personal details
- Born: 20 June 1796 Sinnai, Kingdom of Sardinia
- Died: 30 March 1878 (aged 83) Rome, Kingdom of Italy
- Denomination: Roman Catholic
- Education: University of Cagliari; Pontifical Academy of Ecclesiastical Nobles; Sapienza University of Rome

Styles of Luigi Amat di San Filippo e Sorso
- Reference style: His Eminence
- Spoken style: Your Eminence
- Informal style: Cardinal

Luigi Amat di San Filippo e Sorso (20 June 1796 – 30 March 1878) was the dean of the College of Cardinals during the last part of the record long reign of Pope Pius IX.

== Biography ==
The issue of an ancient and noble Catalan Sardinian family, he was the fifth child and fourth son of Giovanni, Marquess of San Filippo, and Eusebia, Baroness of Sorso. He did his early education wholly in Sardinia, which was unusual for someone who was later to become a major curial official in those days, as most curial officials had to come from the Papal States. Between 1815 and 1825, he obtained distinction as a student of both civil and canon law, and became a priest in 1826. From that point on, he rose rapidly, becoming a bishop just one year after his ordination and soon after a nuncio to the Sicilian kingdom (then separate from mainland Italy), and later to Spain. He was expelled when the Papal States broke off diplomatic relations with Spain in 1835, but two years later Pope Gregory XVI elevated him to the rank of cardinal.

After his elevation to the cardinalate, Cardinal Amat continued his previous work as a papal legate in various parts of Italy until the late 1840s. He participated in the conclave that elected Pius IX and in 1852 opted for the order of cardinal bishops. He was Vice-Chancellor of the Holy Roman Church from later that year until he died. During most of Pius IX's reign Cardinal Amat held control of the police force in the Papal States: it has come to light that early in Pius's reign he sacked many policemen because of their political sympathies and was involved in many major political incidents as sympathy within the Papal States for a united Italy increased in the early 1860s. However, Cardinal Amat had considerable success whilst in Bologna in cooling sympathy for socialism in a city that was to become renowned for this in later years.

In 1876, at the age of eighty, Cardinal Amat became the longest-serving cardinal in the Church, and officiated over the conclave of 1878 that elected Pope Leo XIII. He was already in poor health by this time and as it turned out lived only one month longer than Pope Pius IX.

Catholic Church titles
Preceded by Castruccio Castracane degli Anteliminelli	Cardinal-Bishop of Palestrina; 15 March 1852 – 8 October 1870	Succeeded by Carlo Sacconi
Preceded by Costantino Patrizi Naro	Cardinal-Bishop of Porto; 8 October 1870 – 12 March 1877	Succeeded by Jean Baptiste François Pitra
Preceded by Costantino Patrizi Naro	Cardinal-Bishop of Osta e Velletri and Dean of the College of Cardinals; 12 March 1877 – 30 March 1878	Succeeded by Camillo di Pietro
