= Carlo Luigi Morichini =

Roman cardinal

Cardinal Carlo Luigi Morichini
- Cardinal-Bishop
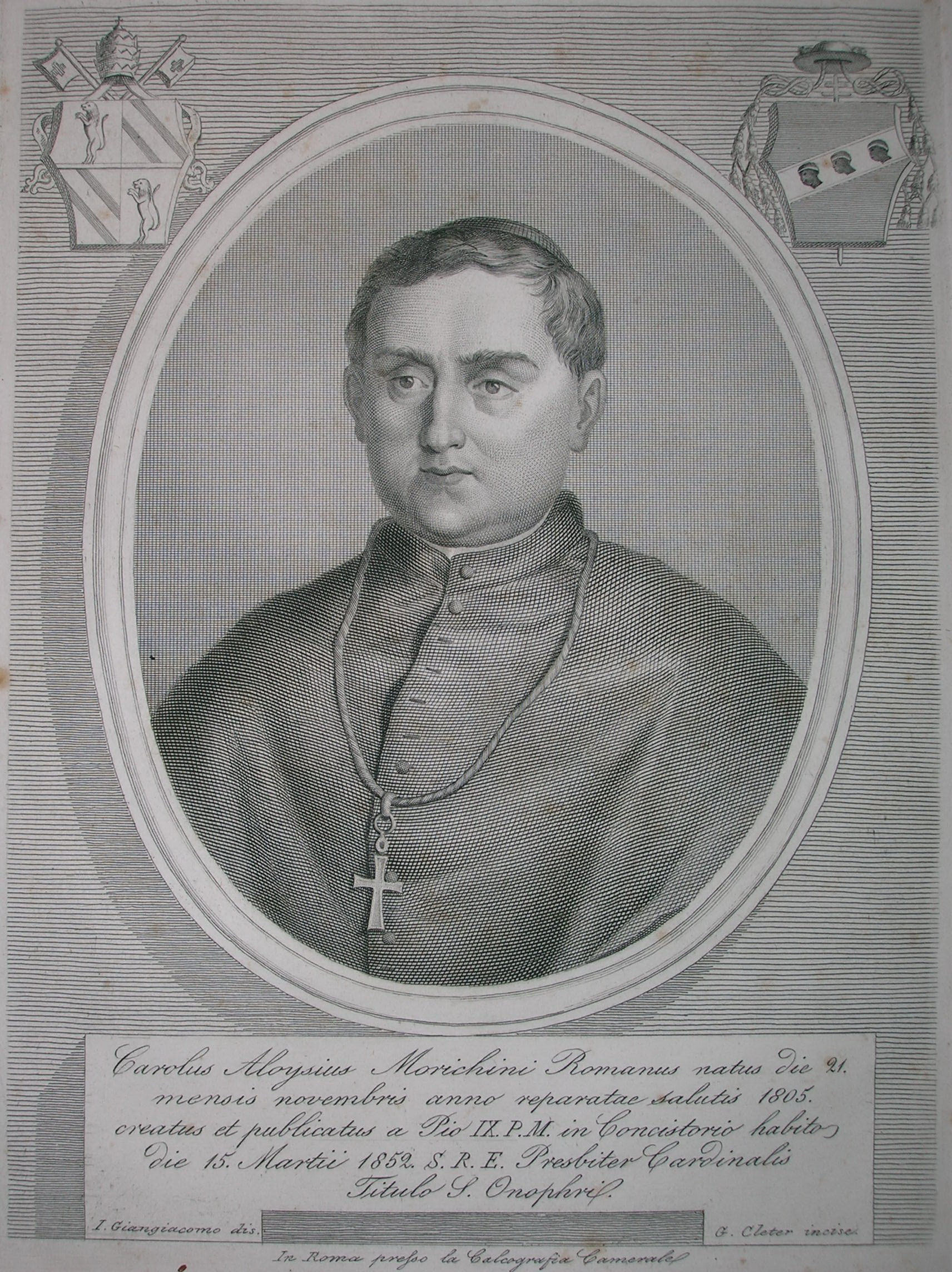
- Diocese: Cardinal Bishop of Albano (1877–1879); Archbishop of Bologna (1871–1876); Bishop of Jesi (1854–1871) titular Archbishop of Nisibis (1845–1854)

Orders
- Ordination: 20 December 1828
- Consecration: 25 May 1845 by Cardinal Luigi Lambruschini
- Created cardinal: 15 March 1852 by Pope Pius IX
- Rank: Cardinal Priest, then Cardinal Bishop

Personal details
- Born: 21 November 1805 Rome, IT
- Died: 26 April 1879 (aged 73) Rome IT
- Buried: Campo Verano Cemetery, Rome
- Parents: Domenico Pino Morichini (1773–1837)
- Occupation: diplomat, administrator
- Profession: priest, bishop
- Education: Rome, La Sapienza (Doctor in utroque iure)
- Coat of arms

Carlo Luigi Morichini (1805–1879) was a Roman Cardinal.

Born on 21 November 1805 in Rome, he was the son of the noted Roman physician Domenico Lino Morichini (1773–1837). He studied philosophy and law for seven years (1822–1818) at the University of Rome, La Sapienza, and was awarded the degree Doctor in utroque iure. He was later awarded a doctorate in theology. He was ordained a priest on 20 December 1828.

== Early employment ==
He obtained a position as secretary to the Auditor of the Sacred Roman Rota, Msgr. Pietro Marini. Morichini was Vice-President of the Ospizio apostolico di S. Michele in Rome. In 1833 he was appointed Referendary of the Tribunal of the Two Signatures. He also became an official (ponente) of the Sacred Congregation on Good Government.

== Diplomat and government minister ==
In 1845 he was appointed Apostolic Nuncio to Bavaria with residence in Munich, and titular Latin archbishop of Nisibis by Pope Gregory XVI. His appointment lasted less than two years (1845–1847). In 1847, he was appointed Treasurer General of the Reverenda Camera Apostolica, which made him responsible for the budget of the Papal States, which was running a deficit and was relying on bank loans for current expenses.

On 10 March 1848 the new Council of State of the Papal States was announced. Under the presidency of Cardinal Giacomo Antonelli, Archbishop Morichini was appointed Vice-President and Minister of Finance. His budget was immediately wrecked by the news of the revolution in Paris in February, and the consequent withdrawal of bank financing. His ministry did not last long. In April 1848 he resigned. In 1848 he was sent on a diplomatic mission by Pope Pius IX to mediate between Austro-Hungary and Piedmont.

== Cardinalate ==
He was created a Cardinal by Pope Pius IX in the Consistory of 15 March 1852, and was assigned the titular church of San Onofrio on 18 March. He was appointed bishop of Jesi, a diocese directly suffragan to the Holy See; he was allowed to retain the title of Archbishop.

On 29 September 1860, the papal fortress of Ancona surrendered to the forces of Victor Emanuel II. On 17 March 1861 he was proclaimed King of Italy, and on 27 March the city of Rome was proclaimed the capital of Italy. Nothing was left to the Pope to govern, outside of the city of Rome itself. The anticlerical government of Turin immediately began to harass those who were faithful to the papacy. On 23 April 1864, Cardinal Morichini was arrested in his episcopal palace in Jesi. He protested that a cardinal could only be judged by the pope, and he was ignored. During the night he was removed to Ancona, where he was imprisoned. The charge was that he had been corresponding with a foreign power. The "foreign power" turned out to be the Apostolic Penitentiary in Rome, with whom Morichini had indeed been corresponding, on a purely spiritual matter, to arrange for a consultation between the Penitentiary and one of his priests over a matter raised in a sacramental confession. Two of the Canons of the cathedral were also arrested and interrogated. The cardinal was released on 10 May, having been exonerated. On his return to Jesi, there were anti-clerical demonstrations. The entire incident was an effort to intimidate the leaders of the papal party in the territory newly annexed by the Turin government. A similar incident was arranged for the bishop of Spoleto.

He participated the First Vatican Council (1869–1870).

He was transferred to the archdiocese of Bologna in 1871 by Pius IX. He relinquished that see on 22 December 1876, having been named Cardinal Secretary of Memorials in the Roman Curia. He became cardinal-bishop of Albano on 12 March 1877.

He participated in the 1878 conclave. On 15 July 1878, he was appointed Prefect of the Supreme Tribunal of the Signature of Justice by the new pope, Leo XIII (Pecci).

He died in Rome on 26 April 1879, and was buried in the Campo Verano cemetery.

== Author ==
Morichini was the author of: Di Giovanni Borgi mastro muratore detto Tatagiovanni e del suo ospizio per gli orfani abbandonati memoria dell'ab. Carloluigi Morichini (Roma: Tipografia Marini 1830); Degl'istituti di pubblica carità ed istruzione primaria e delle prigioni in Roma libri tre (in Italian). Vol. 2 vols. Rome: Marini. 1842. He was also a published poet: La Via Crucis di Gesu Cristo Signor Nostro elegie latine dell'eminentissimo cardinale Carlo Luigi Morichini (in Italian and Latin). Bologna: Tip. Pontificia Mareggiani. 1872.

== Sources ==
- Bräuer, Martin (2014). Handbuch der Kardinäle: 1846-2012 (in German). Berlin: De Gruyter. p. 49. ISBN 978-3-11-026947-5.
- Cavallini, Alessandro (1879). Carlo Luigi cardinal Morichini. Roma: Tipografia dell'Opinione 1879. (in Italian)
- Cavallini, Alessandro (1902). La missione di mons. Morichini all'imperatore d'Austria, Roma 1902. (in Italian)
- Marucchi, Edmondo (1925). Un cardinal umanista vescovo di Jesi. Castelplanio, 1925. (in Italian)
- Ritzler, Remigius; Sefrin, Pirminus (1968). Hierarchia Catholica medii et recentioris aevi (in Latin). Vol. VII (1800–1846). Monasterii: Libreria Regensburgiana.
- Remigius Ritzler; Pirminus Sefrin (1978). Hierarchia catholica Medii et recentioris aevi (in Latin). Vol. VIII (1846–1903). Il Messaggero di S. Antonio.
- Weber, Christoph (1978). Kardinäle und Prälaten in den letzten Jahrzehnten des Kirchenstaates: Elite-Rekrutierung, Karriere-Muster u. soziale Zusammensetzung d. kurialen Führungsschicht zur Zeit Pius' IX. (1846-1878) (in German). Stuttgart: Hiersemann. pp. 280, 309, 353, 489–490. ISBN 978-3-7772-7800-1.
- La gerarchia cattolica e la famiglia pontificia per l'anno 1878 (in Italian). Roma: Monaldi. 1878. pp. 55, 99.
