= Carlo Sacconi =

Italian Cardinal of the Roman Catholic Church

His Eminence Carlo Sacconi
- Prefect of the Congregation of Ceremonies
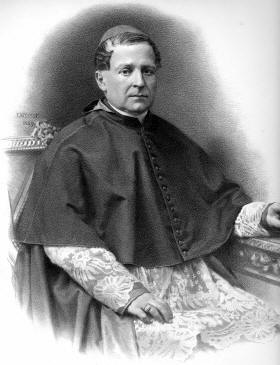
- Appointed: 28 March 1884
- Term ended: 25 February 1889
- Successor: Raffaele Monaco La Valletta
- Other post: Cardinal-Bishop of Ostia (-Velletri)
- Previous posts: Titular Archbishop of Nicaea (1851–1861); Apostolic Nuncio to Germany (1851–1853); Apostolic Nuncio to France (1853–1861); Cardinal-Priest of S. Maria del Popolo (1861–1870); Cardinal-Bishop of Palestrina (1870–1878); Cardinal-Bishop of Porto e Santa Rufina (1878–1884)

Orders
- Consecration: 8 June 1851 by Giacomo Filippo Fransoni
- Created cardinal: 27 September 1861 by Pope Pius IX
- Rank: Cardinal-Bishop

Personal details
- Born: Carlo Sacconi; 9 May 1808 Montalto
- Died: 25 February 1889 (aged 80)
- Denomination: Roman Catholic

Styles of Carlo Sacconi
- Reference style: His Eminence
- Spoken style: Your Eminence
- Informal style: Cardinal
- See: Ostia (suburbicarian see)

Carlo Sacconi J.U.D. (9 May 1808 – 25 February 1889)) was a Cardinal of the Roman Catholic Church and Dean of the College of Cardinals. He is in the episcopal lineage of Pope Francis.

Carlo Sacconi was born in Montalto. He was educated at the seminary of Fermo and later at La Sapienza University, Rome, where he earned a doctorate utriusque iuris (in both canon and civil law).

== Priesthood ==
He was ordained and worked in the diocese of Montalto as a professor in its seminary in 1829 and pro-vicar general for the diocese. He worked with the Congregation of the Tridentine Council for three years. He served as Auditor in the nunciature to the Kingdom of Sardinia in 1839 and chargé d'affaires ad interim in January 1844. He served as chargé d'affaires in the Grand Duchy of Tuscany from 1845 to 1847 and was Internuncio to the Kingdom of Bavaria from 1847 to 1851.

== Episcopate ==
He was appointed titular archbishop of Nicaea on 27 May 1851 by Pope Pius IX and was named full nuncio to Bavaria on 6 June 1851.

== Cardinalate ==
He was created and proclaimed Cardinal-Priest of Santa Maria del Popolo by Pope Pius in the consistory of 27 September 1861. He was commissioned with the erection and organisation of the Latin American Seminary, Rome. He was appointed as Prefect of the economy of the Congregation of Propaganda Fide and of the Reverend Chamber of Despoilments on 29 August 1863. He participated in the First Vatican Council from 1869 to 1870. He opted for the order of bishops and the suburbicarian see of Palestrina on 8 October 1870. He participated in the conclave of 1878 that elected Pope Leo XIII. He opted for the suburbicarian see of Porto e Santa Rufina on 15 July 1878 and again changed his see to the suburbicarian see of Ostia and Velletri, on becoming Dean of the Sacred College of Cardinals on 24 March 1884. He served as Prefect of the Congregation of Ceremonies from 1884 until his death.

== Death and funeral ==
He died of pneumonitis on 25 February 1889 at 4:15 p.m. in the palace of the Apostolic Datary, Rome. The body was transferred to the basilica of Ss. XII Apostoli on 27 February at 11 a.m. The funeral took place in the same basilica on 4 March 1889 at 10 a.m.; the Mass, with twenty-three cardinals in attendance, was celebrated by Félix-Marie de Nekere, titular archbishop of Melitene; the final absolution was imparted by Cardinal Raffaele Monaco La Valletta, Dean of the Sacred College of Cardinals. The body was taken first to Campo Verano cemetery, Rome, and later to Montalto and buried in his family's tomb.

Catholic Church titles
Preceded by Luigi Amat di San Filippo e Sorso	Cardinal-Bishop of Palestrina; 8 October 1870 – 15 July 1878	Succeeded by Antonino de Luca
