= Domenico Morichini =

Italian physician and chemist

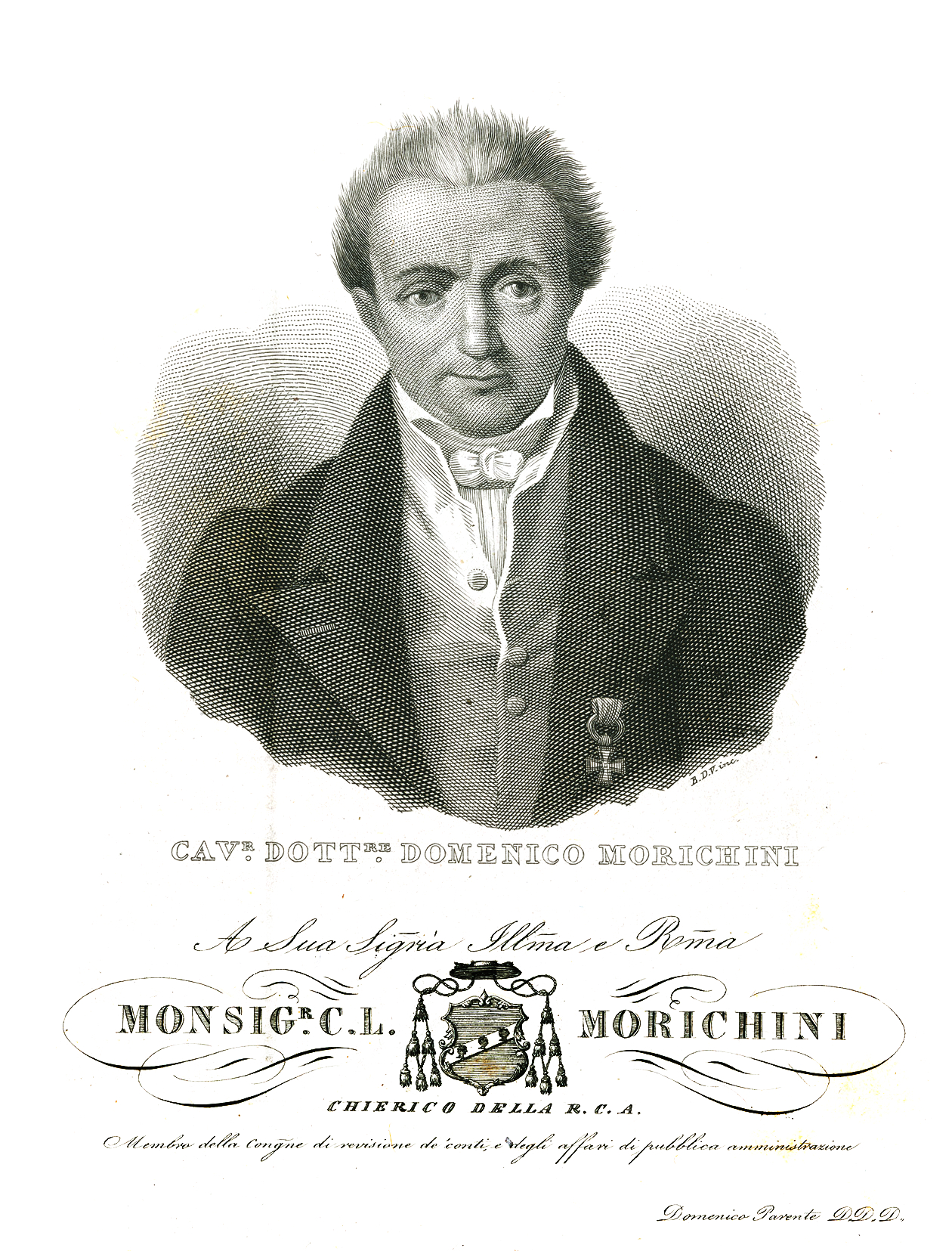

Domenico Lino Morichini (23 September 1773 – 19 November 1836) was an Italian medical doctor and chemist. He was the first to identify fluorine in teeth, first in a fossilized elephant tooth and then in human teeth. He also reported the magnetisation of steel by light rays which stimulated experimental approaches.

== Life and work ==
Morichini was born in Civita d'Antino, L'Aquila, to farmer Anselmo and Domitilla Moratti. Educated in Sora and later Rome, he received a medical degree in 1792 and became physician, working at the hospital of Santo Spirito. He worked on public health and gave lectures on chemistry at the University of Rome. He promoted Lavoisier's ideas on combustion and oxygen rather than follow the older phlogiston theory. He rose in power in the new Roman Republic of 1798. The republic fell in 1799 and he was readmitted by Pope Pius VII as professor at the University of Sapienza where he served until 1833. In 1802 he examined fossil teeth of and elephant and demonstrated the presence of fluorine by chemical analysis. He was able to produce Hydrogen Fluoride which corroded glass and then reacted it with lime to produce Calcium Fluoride which he recognized as identical in properties to fluorspar.

In 1812 Morichini claimed that iron was magnetized by ultraviolet solar rays. This caught the attention of many including Ampere and Faraday. Several people repeated the experiment, some confirmed it including Humphry Davy (who was a patient of Morichini in 1828), Georges Cuvier, Andreas von Baumgartner and Mary Somerville, while others questioned the findings.

Morichini fell ill shortly after his retirement, suffered from a stroke, and died in Rome. His wife Cecilia Calidi (married 1804) and seven children survived him, one of whom was Cardinal Carlo_Luigi_Morichini.
