= Luigi Oreglia di Santo Stefano =

19th Century cardinal

His Eminence Luigi Oreglia di Santo Stefano
- Dean of the College of Cardinals
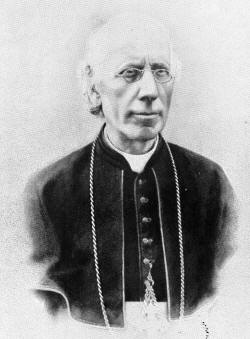
- Church: Roman Catholic Church
- Appointed: 30 November 1896
- Term ended: 7 December 1913
- Predecessor: Raffaele Monaco La Valletta
- Successor: Serafino Vannutelli
- Other posts: Abbot Ordinary of Santi Vincenzo ed Anastasio alle tre Fontane (1877–1913); Camerlengo of the Apostolic Camera (1885–1913); Cardinal-Bishop of Ostia-Velletri (1896–1913); Prefect of the Congregation of Ceremonies (1896–1913)
- Previous posts: Titular Archbishop of Tamiathis (1866–73); Apostolic Nuncio to Belgium (1866–68); Apostolic Nuncio to Portugal (1868–73); Cardinal-Priest of Sant'Anastasia (1874–84); Prefect of the Congregation of Indulgences and Sacred Relics (1876–82); Camerlengo of the College of Cardinals (1882–83); Cardinal-Bishop of Palestrina (1884–89); Cardinal-Bishop of Porto e Santa Rufina (1889–96); Vice-Dean of the College of Cardinals (1889–96)

Orders
- Ordination: February 1851
- Consecration: 13 May 1866 by Lodovico Altieri
- Created cardinal: 22 December 1873 by Pope Pius IX
- Rank: Cardinal-Priest (1874–84); Cardinal-Bishop (1884–1913)

Personal details
- Born: Luigi Oreglia di Santo Stefano; 9 July 1828 Bene Vagienna, Kingdom of Sardinia
- Died: 7 December 1913 (aged 85) Rome, Kingdom of Italy
- Buried: Campo Verano
- Parents: Carlo Giuseppe Luigi Oreglia di Santo Stefano; Teresa Gotti di Selerano
- Education: Pontifical Academy of Ecclesiastical Nobles

Styles of Luigi Oreglia di Santo Stefano
- Reference style: His Eminence
- Spoken style: Your Eminence
- Informal style: Cardinal
- See: Palestrina (suburbicarian), Ostia e Velletri (suburbicarian)

Luigi Oreglia di Santo Stefano (9 July 1828 – 7 December 1913) was a cardinal of the Catholic Church in the late nineteenth century. He was Bishop of Ostia e Velletri and Dean of the Sacred College of Cardinals from 1896 until his death.

== Biography ==
Oreglia was born in Bene Vagienna. He was educated in Turin and became a priest in 1851. After that, he soon rose to become domestic prelate of Pope Pius IX by 1857 and was internuncio in the Netherlands from 1863 to 1866. In May of that year, he was appointed titular archbishop of Tamiathis and served as papal nuncio to Belgium from then until 1868, when he was moved to Portugal. He remained as nuncio until his promotion to the cardinalate when he was returned to Rome.

On 22 December 1873, Oreglia was created a cardinal by Pius IX and two years later, he became Prefect of the Sacred Congregation of Indulgences and Relics. He participated in the 1878 conclave that elected Pope Leo XIII and that pope appointed him Camerlengo on 27 March 1882. Although Oreglia was forced to relinquish the post a year later, he became Camerlengo once more in 1885 and retained that post right up to his death 28 years later. During this period, he rose gradually to become sub-Dean of the College in 1889 and to Dean in 1896.

When Leo XIII died in 1903, Cardinal Oreglia was the sole cardinal elevated by Pope Pius IX. As the only elector in the 1903 conclave with previous experience in electing a pope, and being the leader of the ultraconservative curial faction within the college who wanted a more intransigent pontiff than Leo, Oreglia is widely believed to have played a prominent role in the election of Giuseppe Sarto as Pius X. Indeed, some students of the papacy believe that without the guidance of Oreglia, Cardinal Sarto would have refused the papacy even when he had obtained 55 of the 60 available votes.

Oreglia is also said to have vehemently protested against the announcement by Cardinal Jan Puzyna de Kosielsko regarding the civil veto of Emperor Franz Joseph of Austria against the name of Cardinal Mariano Rampolla, Leo's Secretary of State. Oreglia is also rumored to have prohibited the use of the method of election known as accessus in the 1903 Conclave that elected Pope Pius X.

Oreglia retained his positions with the College of Cardinals until his death in Rome in 1913 at the age of 85.

Catholic Church titles
Preceded by Karl August Graf von Reisach	Cardinal Priest of Santa Anastasia; 16 January 1874 – 24 March 1884	Succeeded by Carlo Laurenzi
Preceded by Antonino de Luca	Cardinal Bishop of Palestrina; 24 March 1884 – 24 May 1889	Succeeded by Angelo Bianchi
Preceded by Giovanni Battista Pitra	Cardinal Bishop of Porto e Santa Rufina; 24 May 1889 – 30 November 1896	Succeeded by Lucido Parocchi
Preceded by Raffaele Monaco La Valletta	Cardinal Bishop of Ostia-Velletri; 30 November 1896 – 7 December 1913	Succeeded by Serafino Vannutelli
