= Luigi Serafini (cardinal) =

Roman Catholic cardinal (1808–1894)

His Eminence Luigi Serafini
- Prefect Emeritus of the Congregation of the Council
- Church: Roman Catholic Church
- Appointed: 31 July 1885
- Term ended: 19 June 1893
- Predecessor: Lorenzo Nina
- Successor: Angelo di Pietro
- Other post: Cardinal-Bishop of Sabina (1888–94)
- Previous posts: Bishop of Tuscanella (1870–80); Bishop of Viterbo (1870–80); Cardinal-Priest of San Girolamo dei Croati (1877–88); Prefect of the Apostolic Signatura (1884–85); Camerlengo of the College of Cardinals (1887–88)

Orders
- Ordination: 25 August 1853
- Consecration: 17 July 1870 by Costantino Patrizi Naro
- Created cardinal: 12 March 1877 by Pope Pius IX
- Rank: Cardinal-Priest (1877–88); Cardinal-Bishop (1888–94)

Personal details
- Born: Luigi Serafini; 6 June 1808 Magliano Sabina, Papal States
- Died: 1 February 1894 (aged 85) Rome, Kingdom of Italy
- Buried: Campo Verano
- Parents: Giuseppe Serafini; Anna Giorgi
- Education: Collegio Romano; La Sapienza University

Luigi Serafini (6 June 1808 – 1 February 1894) was a Roman Catholic bishop and cardinal.

He was born in Magliano Sabina in 1808, and ordained a priest in 1853. In 1870, he was ordained Bishop of Viterbo. In 1877, he was elevated to cardinal. He resigned as bishop of Viterbo in 1880. In 1884, he was appointed Prefect of the Apostolic Signatura. The following year, he was appointed Prefect of the Sacred Congregation of the Council. He died in 1894, at the age of eighty-five.
