= Camerlengo of the Holy Roman Church =

Office of the Papal household

- Camerlengo di Santa Romana Chiesa
- Coat of arms of Kevin Farrell, Cardinal Camerlengo

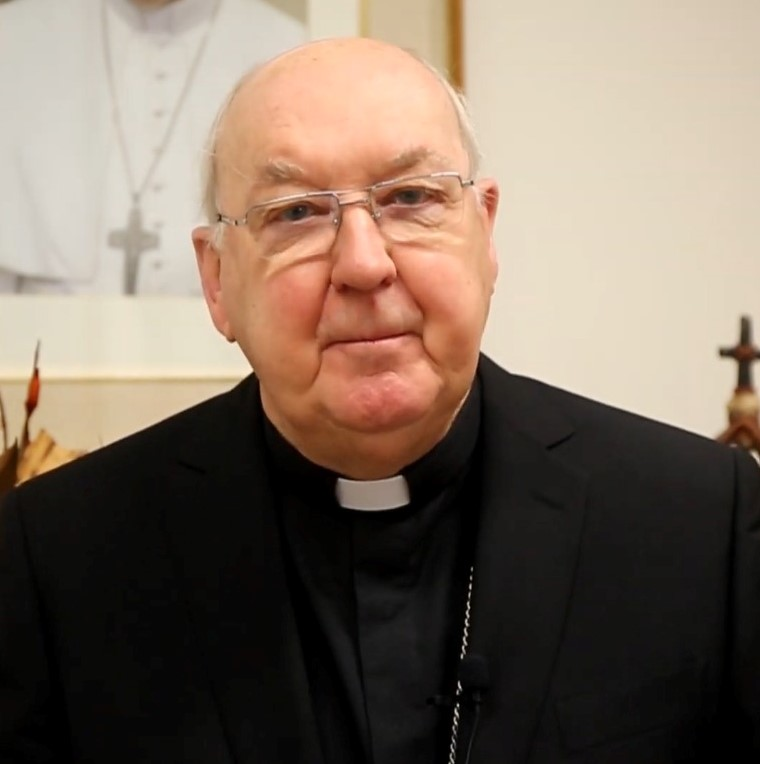
- Incumbent; Cardinal Kevin Farrell since 14 February 2019
- Papal household
- Style: His Eminence
- Status: During Sede vacante: Acting Head of the Vatican City; Acting Head of the Catholic Church
- Member of: Roman Curia; Council of Cardinals
- Reports to: The Pope
- Appointer: The Pope
- Term length: Appointment of a new Pope
- Formation: 8 March 1147
- First holder: Jordan of S. Susanna
- Deputy: Vice camerlengo

The camerlengo of the Holy Roman Church (pl. Camerlenghi) is an office of the papal household that administers the property and revenues of the Holy See. Formerly, his responsibilities included the fiscal administration of the Patrimony of Saint Peter. As regulated in the apostolic constitution Pastor bonus of 1988, the camerlengo is always a cardinal, though this was not the case prior to the 15th century. His heraldic arms are ornamented with two keys – one gold, one silver – in saltire, surmounted by an ombrellino, a canopy or umbrella of alternating red and yellow stripes. These also form part of the coat of arms of the Holy See during a papal interregnum (sede vacante). The camerlengo has been Kevin Farrell since his appointment by Pope Francis on 14 February 2019. The vice camerlengo has been Archbishop Ilson de Jesus Montanari since 1 May 2020.

== History ==
Until the 11th century, the Archdeacon of Rome was responsible for the administration of the property of the Church (i.e., the Diocese of Rome), but the office's numerous ancient privileges and rights had come to make it a frequent hindrance to independent action on the part of the Pope; as a result, when the last Archdeacon Hildebrand was elected to the Papacy as Gregory VII in 1073, he suppressed the Archdiaconate and the prelate entrusted with the supervision of the Apostolic Camera (Camera Apostolica), i.e., the possessions of the Holy See, became known as the camerarius ("Chamberlain"). The camerarius was for centuries a central figure in the Papal court. The name camerlengo was adopted later, likely after the fashion of Valois-Anjou court.

It was the obligation of the camerarius to formally establish the death of the Pope. Gradually, this evolved in the theory that the camerarius, as the Chief of the Curia, should conduct normal business even after the death of the Pope, and also conduct the burial and the preparation for the new election. This process was evident with camerarius Boso Breakspeare. During the long sede vacante of 1268 to 1271, the importance of the camerarius was so clear that the cardinals were ready to elect a new one if he died.

Prior to the 18th century, the camerlengo enjoyed an income of 10,000 to 12,000 scudi a year out of the Apostolic Camera. He had jurisdiction over all suits involving the Apostolic Camera, and could judge separately or in association with the Clerics of the Apostolic Camera; he was not impeded by Consistory. He has appellate jurisdiction over suits decided by the Masters of the Roads. In a narration of the 18th century, the camerlengo is the chief officer in the Apostolic Camera, the Financial Council of the Pope. In his office are the Governor of Rome (who is vice-Chancellor), The Treasurer, the Auditor, the President, the Advocate General, the Fiscal Procurator, the Commissary, and twelve Clerks of the Chamber (one with the special title of Prefect of the Grain Supply, another Prefect of Provisions, another Prefect of Prisons, and another Prefect of Roads). Each Clerk of the Chamber received around 8,000 scudi a year, representing 10% of the business that passes through his office.

The powers and functions of the camerlengo were diminished considerably in the 19th century, first by the reorganisation of the papal government after the election of Pope Pius VII in 1800, then by the reorganization of the papal government after the return of Pope Pius IX from exile in 1850, and then by the loss of the Papal States in 1860 and the City of Rome in 1870. The chief beneficiary of these changes was the Cardinal Secretary of State. Since early in the 20th century, the offices of Secretary of State and camerlengo were held concurrently by Pietro Gasparri (1916–1930), Eugenio Pacelli (1935–1939), Jean-Marie Villot (1970–1979), and Tarcisio Bertone (2007–2013). Pope Francis appointed as camerlengo prelates who had not been Secretary of State: Jean-Louis Tauran (2014–2018) and Kevin Joseph Farrell (2019–present).

== Responsibilities ==
Coat of arms of the Camerlengo

The camerlengo is responsible for the formal determination of the death of the reigning pope; the traditional procedure—abandoned centuries ago—was to call his baptismal name (eg "<Nomen>, dormisne?" meaning "<Name>, are you sleeping?"). (Note: According to Hartwell de la Garde Grissell, Chamberlain of Honor di numero to Pope Pius IX, Pope Leo XIII, and Pope Pius X, who was present at the ceremony of recognition in 1903: "It may also be here mentioned that no such ceremony as striking the dead Pope's forehead with a silver hammer takes place, and that the exact method of calling aloud his name is not tied down to any determinate form, but is left to the discretion of the Cardinal Camerlengo.... In an original [manuscript] diary in my possession written by Domenico Cappelli of Ascoli, who was Master of Ceremonies to five popes—Alexander VII., Clement IX., Clement X., Innocent XI., and Alexander VIII.—he states that the custom of calling aloud three times the words 'Pater Sancte' was discontinued on the death of Clement X. in 1676.) After the pope is declared dead, the camerlengo takes possession of the Ring of the Fisherman and cuts it with shears in the presence of the cardinals. This act symbolizes the end of the late pope's authority and prevents its use in forging documents. The camerlengo then notifies the appropriate officers of the Roman Curia and the Dean of the College of Cardinals. He participates in the preparations for the conclave and the pope's funeral.

In the past the camerlengo took possession of the pope's last will and testament and took responsibility for revealing its contents. Now, the deceased pope's will is given to the College of Cardinals and its content is revealed during the first meeting of the College of Cardinals following a pope's passing. The only responsibility still in the camerlengo's hands is to safekeep the last will of the pope until the college takes possession of it.

Until a successor pope can be elected, during the sede vacante ('seat is vacant') period, the camerlengo serves as Vatican City's acting sovereign. He is no longer, however, responsible broadly for the government of the Catholic Church when the papacy is vacant; that task was transferred in 1996 to the College of Cardinals, by the Apostolic Constitution Universi Dominici gregis. The camerlengo's power is extremely limited: enough to allow Church institutions to continue to operate and perform some basic functions, without making any definitive decisions or appointments that are normally reserved to the pope or his delegatee. However, to facilitate these basic functions, unlike the bulk of the Roman Curia, the camerlengo retains his office during the sede vacante period. He becomes effectively the executive director of operations for Vatican City and the Holy See, answerable to the College of Cardinals. This is primarily to carry out the College's decisions with regard to the papal funeral and the preparations for the conclave that will elect a new pope. The only other people who keep their offices during this time are the major penitentiary, the archpriest of St. Peter's Basilica, the papal almoner, and the vicars general for Rome and for the Vatican City State.

== List of camerlengos ==
Those who have held the office of camerlengo are:

- Jordan of Santa Susanna (documented 1147–1151)
- Franchus (1151)
- Rainierus (documented 1151)
- Yngo (documented 1154)
- Boso (1154/55 – 1159)
- Bernard the Templar (documented 1163)
- Teodino de Arrone (documented 1163)
- Franco Gaufridus Fulchier (documented 1175–1181)
- Gerardo Allucingoli (ca.1182/84)
- Melior le Maitre (documented 1184–1187)
- Cencio Savelli (1188–1198), later Pope Honorius III
- Riccardo (documented 1198)
- Ottaviano dei Conti di Segni (1200–1206)
- Stefano di Ceccano (1206–1216)
- Pandolfo Verraclo (1216–1222)
- Sinibaldo (ca.1222 – ca.1227)
- Rinaldo Conti di Segni (1227–1231), later Pope Alexander IV
- (1231–1236 – no information found)
- Giovanni da Ferentino (1236–1238)
- (1238–1243 – no information found)
- Martino (ca. 1243 – ca. 1251)
- Boetius (1251–1254)
- Niccolo da Anagni (1254–1261)
- Pierre de Roncevault (1261–1262)
- Pierre de Charny (1262–1268)
- Odo of Châteauroux (occupied the post in 1270)
- Pietro de Montebruno (occupied the post in 1272)
- Guglielmo di San Lorenzo (occupied the post in 1274)
- Raynaldus Marci (occupied the post in 1277)
- Angelo de Vezzosi (occupied the post in 1278)
- Berardo di Camerino (1279–1288)
- Niccolo (occupied the post in 1289)
- Tommaso d'Ocra (1294)
- Teodorico Ranieri (ca. 1295 – 1299)
- Giovanni (1301–1305)
- Arnaud Frangier de Chanteloup (1305–1307)
- Bertrand des Bordes (1307–1311)
- Arnaud d'Aux (1311–1319)
- Gasbert de Valle (1319–1347)
- Stefano Aldebrandi Cambaruti (1347–1360)
- Arnaud Aubert (1361–1371)
- Pierre du Cros (1371–1383)
- Marino Giudice (documented 1380–1382)
- Marino Bulcani (documented 1386–1394)
- Corrado Caraccioli (documented 1396–1405)
- Leonardo de Sulmona (named in 1405)
- Antonio Correr (1406–1415)
- François de Conzie (1415 (Note: 1383–1415 camerlengo of the obediences of Avignon and Pisa in the Great Western Schism.)–1431)
- Francesco Condulmer (1432–1440)
- Ludovico Trevisan (1440–1465)
- Latino Orsini (1471–1477)
- Guillaume d'Estouteville (1477–1483)
- Raffaele Riario (1483–1521)
- Innocenzo Cibo (1521)
- Francesco Armellini Pantalassi de' Medici (1521–1527)
- Agostino Spinola (1528–1537)
- Guido Ascanio Sforza di Santa Fiora (1537–1564)
- Vitellozzo Vitelli (1564–1568)
- Michele Bonelli (1568–1570)
- Luigi Cornaro (1570–1584)
- Filippo Guastavillani (1584–1587)
- Enrico Caetani (1587–1599)
- Pietro Aldobrandini (1599–1621)
- Ludovico Ludovisi (1621–1623)
- Ippolito Aldobrandini (1623–1638)
- Antonio Barberini (1638–1671)
- Paluzzo Paluzzi Altieri degli Albertoni (1671–1698)
- Galeazzo Marescotti, pro-camerlengo (1698)
- Giovanni Battista Spinola (1698–1719)
- Annibale Albani (1719–1747)
- Silvio Valenti Gonzaga (1747–1756)
- Girolamo Colonna di Sciarra (1756–1763)
- Carlo Rezzonico (1763–1799)
- Romoaldo Braschi-Onesti (1800–1801)
- Giuseppe Maria Doria Pamphili, pro-camerlengo (1801–1814)
- Bartolomeo Pacca (1814–1824)
- Pietro Francesco Galleffi (1824–1837)
- Giacomo Giustiniani (1837–1843)
- Tommaso Riario Sforza (1843–1857)
- Lodovico Altieri (1857–1867)
- Filippo de Angelis (1867–1877)
- Gioacchino Pecci (1877–1878), elected Pope Leo XIII
- Camillo di Pietro (1878–1884)
- Domenico Consolini (1884)
- Luigi Oreglia di Santo Stefano (1885–1913)
- Francesco Salesio Della Volpe (1914–1916)
- Pietro Gasparri (1916–1934)
- Eugenio Pacelli (1935–1939), elected Pope Pius XII
- Lorenzo Lauri (1939–1941)
- Benedetto Aloisi Masella (1958–1970)
- Jean-Marie Villot (1970–1979)
- Paolo Bertoli (1979–1985)
- Sebastiano Baggio (1985–1993)
- Eduardo Martínez Somalo (1993–2007)
- Tarcisio Bertone (2007–2014)
- Jean-Louis Tauran (2014–2018)
- Kevin Joseph Farrell (2019–present)

Two camerlengos have been elected Pope: Gioacchino Pecci (Pope Leo XIII) in 1878 and Eugenio Pacelli (Pope Pius XII) in 1939. Two others, Cencio Savelli (elected Pope Honorius III in 1216) and Rinaldo Conti di Segni (elected Pope Alexander IV in 1254), were not camerlengo at the time of their election to the papacy, Cencio having served from 1188 until 1198 and Rinaldo from 1227 until 1231. (Note: It is sometimes claimed that Cosimo Gentile Migliorati (Pope Innocent VII from 1404 until 1406) was also Camerlengo of the Holy Roman Church, but no document mentioning him in this capacity has been found.)

== In popular culture ==
- Dan Brown's novel Angels & Demons and its film adaptation features a camerlengo as a principal character. In the novel it is Carlo Ventresca, an Italian priest who is later revealed to be the son of the Pope conceived through artificial insemination. In the wake of the Pope's death the camerlengo is serving an interrex function, fulfulling nominal papal duties until the Conclave has made its decision. In the film adaptation, the character is changed to the Northern Irish Patrick McKenna (played by Ewan McGregor), who is not a cardinal but the former papal chaplain to Pope Pius XVI. At the end of the film, the newly elected Pope Luke I selects the German cardinal Strauss (played by Armin Mueller-Stahl), the former Great Elector of the College of Cardinals, to succeed McKenna as camerlengo.
- The HBO series The Young Pope and its sequel series The New Pope features camerlengo Angelo Voiello (played by Silvio Orlando) as a supporting character. Voiello also serves as Cardinal Secretary of State, and remains at his post through the papacies of Pius XIII (Jude Law), Francis II (Marcello Romolo) and John Paul III (John Malkovich) until Voiello becomes pope himself.
