= Costantino Patrizi Naro =

Italian cardinal

His Eminence Costantino Patrizi Naro
- Dean of the College of Cardinals
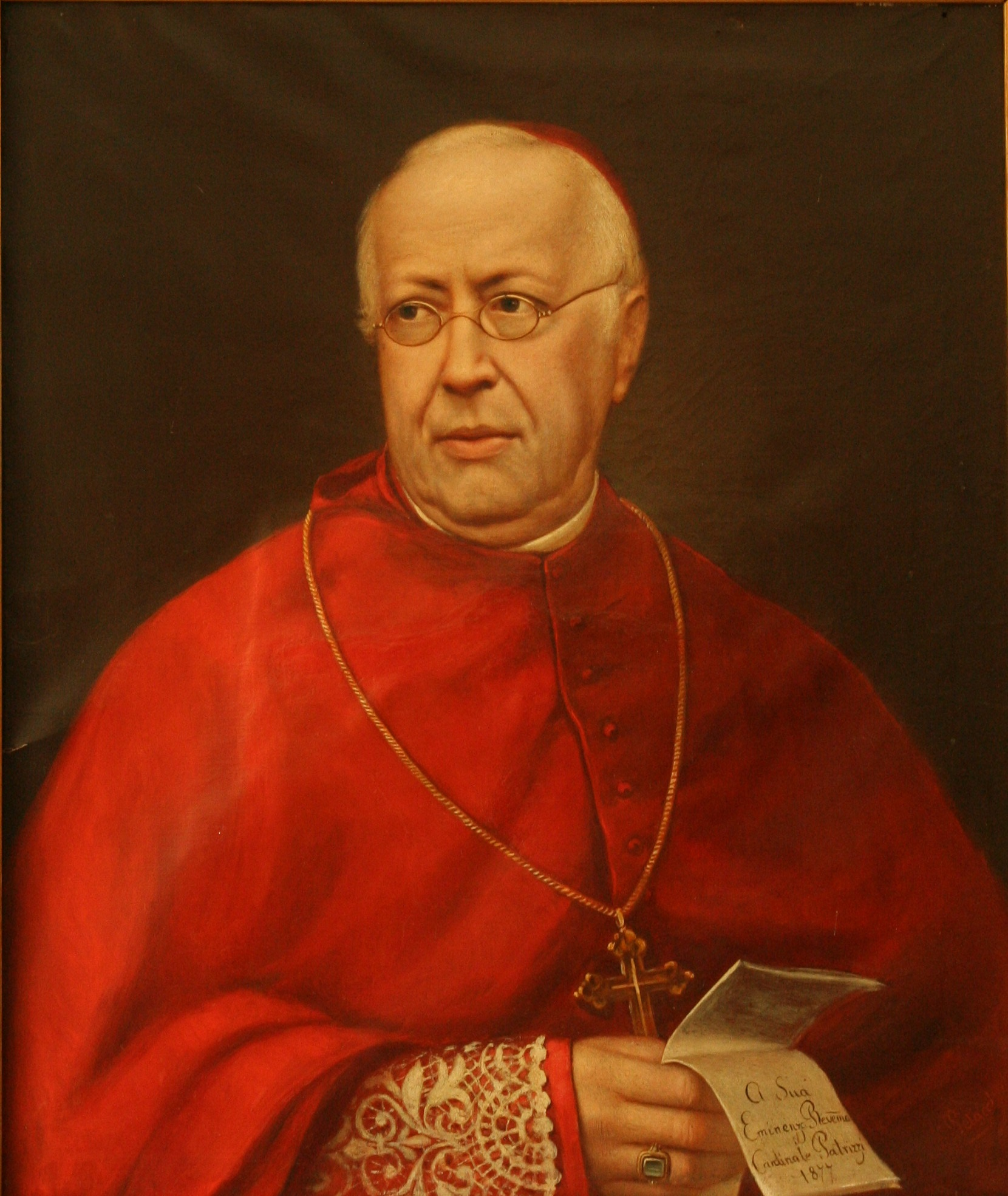
- Church: Roman Catholic Church
- Appointed: 8 October 1870
- Term ended: 17 December 1876
- Predecessor: Mario Mattei
- Successor: Luigi Amat di San Filippo e Sorso
- Other posts: Archpriest of Santa Maria Maggiore (1845–76); Secretary of the Commission of Roman and Universal Inquisition (1860–76); Vice-Dean of the College of Cardinals (1860–76); Cardinal-Protector of the Pontifical Ecclesiastical Academy (1867–76); Archpriest of the Basilica of Saint John Lateran (1867–76); Cardinal-Bishop of Ostia-Velletri (1870–76)
- Previous posts: Titular Archbishop of Philippi (1828–36); Prefect of the Prefecture of the Holy Apostolic Palaces (1832–36); Cardinal-Priest of San Silvestro in Capite (1836–49); Prefect of the Congregation of Bishops and Regulars (1839–41); Vicar General of Rome (1841–49); Cardinal-Bishop of Albano (1849–60); Camerlengo of the College of Cardinals (1852–53); Prefect of the Congregation for Rites (1854–60); Cardinal-Bishop of Porto e Santa Rufina (1860–70)

Orders
- Ordination: 16 June 1819 by Carlo Odescalchi
- Consecration: 21 December 1828 by Carlo Odescalchi
- Created cardinal: 23 June 1834 (in pectore); 11 July 1836 (revealed) by Pope Gregory XVI
- Rank: Cardinal-Priest (1836–49); Cardinal-Bishop (1849–76)

Personal details
- Born: Costantino Patrizi Naro; 4 September 1798 Siena, Grand Duchy of Tuscany
- Died: 17 December 1876 (aged 78) Rome, Kingdom of Italy
- Buried: Basilica of Saint John Lateran (since 1902)
- Parents: Marquis Giovanni Patrizi-Naro and Cunegunda of Saxe-Lusitz

Costantino Patrizi Naro JUD (4 September 1798 – 17 December 1876) was a long-serving Italian Cardinal who became Dean of the College of Cardinals.

== Biography ==
Born in Siena, Patrizi Naro was the son of Giovanni Patrizi Naro Montoro, 8th Marquis of Montoro and Kunigunde of Saxe-Lusitz, the fifth-born daughter of Prince Francis Xavier of Saxony and his morganatic wife Maria Chiara Spinucci. Cardinal Benedetto Naro was his great-uncle. He was educated in the Collegio dei Protonotari Apostolici in Rome. He studied for and was awarded a doctorate in utroque iure. He was ordained in 1819. He worked as a judge (auditor) of the Roman Rota.

He was appointed titular archbishop of Philippi on 15 December 1828 by Pope Leo XII. He was consecrated on 21 December by Cardinal Carlo Odescalchi, assisted by Lorenzo Mattei and by Paolo Agosto Foscolo. He was appointed Nuncio to the Grand Duchy of Tuscany on 16 January 1829. He remained in Tuscany until he was appointed as Prefect of the Apostolic Palace on 2 July 1832 by Pope Gregory XVI.

He was created cardinal, but only in pectore, in the consistory of 23 June 1834 and publicly proclaimed on 11 July 1836, becoming Cardinal-Priest of San Silvestro in Capite. He was appointed Prefect of the Sacred Congregation of Bishops and Regulars on 6 July 1839. He was archpriest of the Basilica di Santa Maria Maggiore, from 1845 to 1867. He participated in the conclave of 1846 that elected Pope Pius IX. He opted for the order of bishops, taking the suburbicarian see of Albano, on 20 April 1849. In 1858 he and King Ferdinand II reiterated a petition to the Pope for the authorization of the worship of the Seven Archangels. Pope Pius IX. appointed him as Secretary of the Congregation of the Roman and Universal Inquisition in 1860. He served as Archpriest of the patriarchal Lateran basilica from 1867 until his death. He also served as Dean of the Sacred College of Cardinals from 1870 until his death in 1876.

Catholic Church titles
Preceded by Giovanni Marazzani Visconti	Prefect of the Apostolic Palace; 2 July 1832 – 6 July 1839	Succeeded by Pietro Gasparri
Preceded by Giuseppe Sala	Prefect of the Sacred Congregation of Bishops and Regulars; 6 July 1839 – 22 December 1841	Succeeded by Pietro Ostini
Preceded by Luigi Del Drago	Archpriest of the Basilica di Santa Maria Maggiore; 24 May 1845 – 21 September 1867	Succeeded by Gustav Adolf Hohenlohe
Preceded by Pietro Ostini	Cardinal-Bishop of Albano; 20 April 1849 – 17 December 1860	Succeeded by Lodovico Altieri
Preceded by Vincenzo Macchi	Secretary of the Supreme Sacred Congregation of the Roman and Universal Inquisition; 10 October 1860 – 17 December 1876	Succeeded by Prospero Caterini
Preceded by Giuseppe Milesi Pironi Ferretti	Cardinal-Bishop of Porto e Santa Rufina; 17 December 1860 – 8 October 1870	Succeeded by Luigi Amato di San Filippo e Sorso
Preceded by Lodovico Altieri	Archpriest of the Basilica of St. John Lateran; 21 September 1867 – 17 December 1876	Succeeded by Flavio Chigi
Preceded by Mario Mattei	Cardinal-Bishop of Osta e Velletri and Dean of the College of Cardinals; 8 October 1870 – 17 December 1876	Succeeded by Luigi Amat di San Filippo e Sorso
