= Sebastiano Pisani =

Sebastiano Pisani may refer to:

- Sebastiano Pisani (iuniore) (1630–1690), Italian Roman Catholic bishop
- Sebastiano Pisani (seniore) (1606–1670), Italian Roman Catholic bishop
