= Gaetano Cozzi =

Italian historian

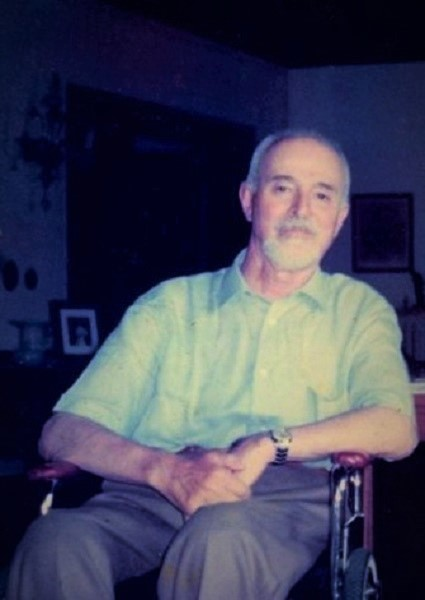
- Gaetano Cozzi
- Born: September 15, 1922; Zero Branco
- Died: March 15, 2001 (aged 78); Venezia
- Occupations: historian, professor

Gaetano Cozzi (Zero Branco, September 15, 1922 – Venice, 15 March 2001) was an Italian historian, professor at Padua University, and researcher with the Giorgio Cini Foundation and Fondazione Benetton Studi e Ricerche. He was a specialist in Venetian history, with special attention to the institutions, the relationship between law and society and the cultural environment.

== Biography ==
=== Education and period in Milan ===
He was born in Zero Branco (Province of Treviso, Italy) on 15 September 1922 of Elsa Olivetti and Giovanni Cozzi.

He spent his childhood and adolescence in Legnano (near Milan). He started high school in Milan, then, in 1938, he entered in the military school. In 1939 he entered the Military Academy of Modena. In 1942a and three years later, in March 1942, he left it as a Lieutenant of the “Alpini”. A month later, he was affected with paralysis as a consequence of a former fall from his horse. Despite the limitations caused by his illness, Cozzi took part in the Resistance with propaganda activities.

Meanwhile, he prepared his university exams as an external candidate; in 1949 he graduated in history of Italian Law at the University of Milan. His thesis was about Paolo Sarpi and relationship between Church and State. He was most influenced by the writers Benedetto Croce and Adolfo Omodeo.

=== Venice and beginning of his historical activity ===
After the war, he moved to Venice. Soon after, he interrupted his studies on Sarpi and devoted himself to the study of an ancient Venetian Magistracy, the Esecutori contro la Bestemmia, that prosecuted not only political and religious offences, but also any behaviour in conflict with official values.

In this period, he formed a friendship with Fernand Braudel, one of the fathers of the “Annales”, who met Cozzi just in Venice (even if later he will prefer Lucien Febre's historical method). In 1955 when the Institute of History of the Giorgio Cini Foundation was created, he became secretary. In 1958, laid up in bed because of his illness, he wrote his first book about Nicolò Contarini, that he dictated to his mother Elsa.

=== University teaching ===
In 1960 he started teaching at the Faculty of Foreign Languages and Literature in Venice. In 1962 he married Luisa Zille., an expert in philology. They collaborated to the publishing in 1969 of the complete works of Paolo Sarpi, edited by Ricciardi.

In 1966, he taught medieval and modern history at Faculty of Political Science of Padua University, In 1970 he returned to Ca' Foscari in Venice.

In the late '70s, he promoted among his collaborators and students, a series of researches about State and Justice in the Republic of Venice in the modern age. That year, Cozzi received the prestigious Chabod award for historiography from the Accademia dei Lincei.

In 1986 the first volume of the history of the Republic of Venice, edited by Cozzi and Michael Knapton, was published by UTET, as part of a History of Italy, directed by Giuseppe Galasso. The aim of the book is to demonstrate the symbiosis between Venice and its mainland, and the hegemonic ambitions of Venice(competing with the Roman Church), in Italy and in the Mediterranean Sea.

=== Latest years ===
Cozzi became Director of the Institute of History of the Cini Foundation, a member of the Accademia dei Lincei, and, in 1987, director of the newly formed administrator FBSR, (Fondazione Benetton Studi e Ricerche). In this institution, initiated a series of researches on his favorite themes: the landscape, the countryside, the emigration and games.

In 1998 his teaching activity ended with a ceremony in his honor at the Ca' Foscari University of Venice where he was given the title of Emeritus Professor.

On 15 March 2001, at the age of 78, he died in Venice. He was buried in the cemetery of Zero Branco, next to the companion of his life, Luisa.

An eloquent and touching commemoration of Gaetano Cozzi was given by Professor Gino Benzoni, a lifelong friend, at the “Istituto veneto di Scienze, Lettere e Arti”, on 23 March 2002.

== Works ==
- Il doge Nicolò Contarini. Ricerche sul patriziato veneziano agli inizi del Seicento, Venezia-Roma, Istituto per la collaborazione culturale, 1958.
- Note su tribunali e procedure penali a Venezia nel ‘700, in «Rivista Storica Italiana», LXXVII, IV, 1965, pp. 931-952.
- Galileo Galilei, Paolo Sarpi e la società veneziana, Firenze, Barbera, 1965.
- Paolo Sarpi, La Repubblica di Venezia la Casa d’Austria e gli Uscocchi. Aggionta e supplimento all’Istoria degli Uscochi. Trattato di pace et accomodamento, by Gaetano e Luisa Cozzi, Bari, Laterza, 1965.
- Paolo Sarpi, in Storia della letteratura italiana, Vol. V, Il Seicento, direct by Emilio Cecchi and Natalino Sapegno, Milan, Garzanti, 1967, pp. 361-413.
- Politica e diritto nei tentativi di riforma del diritto penale veneto nel Settecento, in Sensibilità e razionalità nel Settecento, by Vittore Branca, II, Firenze, Sansoni, 1967, pp. 373-421.
- Religione, moralità e giustizia a Venezia: vicende della magistratura degli Esecutori contro la bestemmia, Padova, C.L.E.U.P., 1967-1968.
- Marin Sanudo il giovane: dalla cronaca alla storia (Nel V centenario della sua nascita), «Rivista Storica Italiana», LXXX, II, 1968, pp. 297-314.
- Paolo Sarpi, Opere, by Gaetano and Luisa Cozzi, Milan-Naples, Ricciardi, 1969.
- Authority and the Law in Renaissance Venice, in J.R. Hale (ed. by), Renaissance Venice, London, Faber and Faber, 1973, pp. 293-345.
- Voce Sarpi, Paolo (1552-1623), in Dizionario critico della letteratura italiana, vol. III, Torino, UTET, 1973, pp. 308-312.
- Ambiente veneziano, ambiente veneto, in Stefano Rocco-Mazzinghi (by), L’uomo e il suo ambiente, Firenze, Sansoni, 1973, pp. 93-146.
- Padri, figli e matrimoni clandestini (metà sec. XVI - metà sec. XVIII), «La Cultura», XIV, 2-3, 1976, pp. 169-213.
- La giustizia e la politica agli albori dell’età moderna, in Elena Fasano Guarini (by), Potere e società negli stati regionali italiani del ‘500 e ‘600, Bologna, il Mulino, 1978.
- Note su Carlo Goldoni, la società veneziana e il suo diritto, in «Atti dell’Istituto veneto di scienze, lettere ed arti», CXXXVII, 1978–1979, pp. 141–157.
- Paolo Sarpi tra Venezia e l’Europa, Torino, Einaudi, 1979, pp. 135–234.
- La donna, l’amore e Tiziano, in Tiziano e Venezia, Vicenza, Neri Pozza, 1980, pp. 47–63.
- Gaetano Cozzi (a cura di), Stato società e giustizia nella Repubblica veneta (sec. XV-XVIII), Roma, Jouvence, 1980.
- Repubblica di Venezia e Stati italiani. Politica e giustizia dal secolo XVI al secolo XVIII, Torino, Einaudi, 1982.
- Gaetano Cozzi (a cura di), Stato società e giustizia nella Repubblica veneta (sec. XV-XVIII), II, Roma, Jouvence, 1985.
- Gaetano Cozzi - Michael Knapton - Giovanni Scarabello (a cura di), La Repubblica di Venezia in età moderna. Dal 1517 alla fine della Repubblica, Torino, UTET, 1992
- Gaetano Cozzi - Paolo Prodi (a cura di), Storia di Venezia. Vol. VI. Dal Rinascimento al Barocco, Roma, Istituto della Enciclopedia Italiana, 1994.
- Venezia barocca. Conflitti di uomini e idee nella crisi del Seicento veneziano, Venezia, Il Cardo, 1995.
