= Roman Catholic Diocese of Nyssa =

Catholic titual see in Turkey

Diocese of Nyssa (Latin: Dioecesis Nyssena) is a titular see in the Catholic Church.

== History ==
Nyssa (Latin: Nissa) was important enough in the Roman province of Cappadocia Prima to become a suffragan of its capital's Metropolitan, the Archdiocese of Caesarea in Cappadocia (Kayseri). The earliest bishop of Nyssa whose name is known is Gregory of Nyssa, who was the bishop of Nyssa from about 372 to 394 and brother of Basil the Great, bishop of Nyssa's metropolitan see, Caesarea in Cappadocia. The bishop at the time of the Council of Ephesus in 431 was Heraclides. Musonius took part in the Robber Council of Ephesus in 449, Ioannes in the Second Council of Constantinople in 553, another Ioannes in the Third Council of Constantinople in 680, Paulus in the Trullan Council in 693, a third Ioannes in the Second Council of Nicaea in 787, and Ignatius in the Photian Council of Constantinople (879). A 10th-century bishop named Germanus is known for his ecclesiastical writings.

In the 18th century, the Catholic Church began appointing titular bishops of Nyssa. The Catholic see is currently vacant.

== List of bishops ==
- Guillaume Tual (1715.02.04 – death 1716.02.24) as Auxiliary Bishop of Diocese of Strasbourg (France) (1715.02.04 – 1716.02.24)
- Tommaso Sextri, Dominican Order (O.P.) (1716.03.18 – 1721.08.14) as Coadjutor Vicar Apostolic of Eastern Tonking (Vietnam; now Diocese of Hai Phòng) (1716.03.18 – 1721.08.14), next succeeding as Apostolic Vicar of Eastern Tonking (1721.08.14 – death 1737.08.08)
- Kryspin Cieszkowski (1772.12.14 – death 1792?) as Auxiliary Bishop of (Latin) Archdiocese of Lviv (Ukraine) (1772.12.14 – 1792?)
- Federico Guarini, Benedictine Confederation (O.S.B.) (1818.03.16 – 1828.06.23) as Bishop-Prelate of Territorial Prelature of Altamura (Italy) (1818 – 1828.06.23); later Bishop of Venosa (Italy) (1828.06.23 – death 1837.09)
- Joseph Feßler (1862.04.07 – 1865.03.27) as Auxiliary Bishop of Diocese of Brixen (Austrian Empire, presently in Italy) (1862.04.07 – 1865.03.27); later Bishop of Sankt Pölten (Austria) ([1864.09.23] 1865.03.27 – death 1872.04.23)
- Angelo Di Pietro (1866.06.25 – 1877.12.28) as Auxiliary Bishop of Diocese of Velletri (Italy) (1866.06.25 – 1877.12.28); next Titular Archbishop of Nazianzus (1877.12.28 – 1893.01.16) as papal diplomat : Apostolic Delegate to Argentina (1877.12.28 – 1879.09.30), Apostolic Internuncio to Brazil (1879.09.30 – 1882.03.21), Apostolic Nuncio to Kingdom of Bavaria (1882.03.21 – 1887.05.23), Prefect of Sacred Congregation of the Council (1893.01.16 – 1902.07.20), created Cardinal-Priest of Ss. Bonifacio ed Alessio (1893.06.15 – 1903.06.22), Camerlengo of Sacred College of Cardinals (1895.03.18 – 1896), Prefect of Sacred Congregation of Bishops and Regulars(1902.07.20 – 1902.11.27), Pro-Datary of His Holiness of Apostolic Dataria (1902.11.27 – 1908.06.29), transferred Cardinal-Priest of S. Lorenzo in Lucina (1903.06.22 – death 1914.12.05), promoted Datary of His Holiness of Apostolic Dataria (1908.06.29 – 1914.12.05)
- Placido Maria Schiaffino (Italian), Olivetans (O.S.B. Oliv.) (1878.08.30 – 1885.07.27) as Roman Curia official : President of Pontifical Ecclesiastical Academy (1878.11.02 – 1884.11.18), Secretary of Sacred Congregation of Bishops and Regulars (1884.11.18 – 1888.04.06); next created Cardinal-Priest of Santi Giovanni e Paolo (1885.07.30 – 1889.09.23), Prefect of Sacred Congregation of the Index (1888.04.06 – 1889.09.23), Librarian of Vatican Apostolic Library (1889.02.20 – death 1889.09.23)
- Antonio Maria De Pol (1887.11.25 – 1888.03.04) as Coadjutor Bishop of Vicenza (Italy) (1887.11.25 – 1888.03.04); next succeeded as Bishop of Vicenza (1888.03.04 – 1892.07.04)
- Bartolomeo Bacilieri (1888.06.01 – 1900.04.01) as Coadjutor Bishop of Verona (Italy) (1888.06.01 – 1900.04.01); next succeeded as Bishop of Verona (1900.04.01 – 1923.02.14), created Cardinal-Priest of S. Bartolomeo all’Isola (1901.04.18 – death 1923.02.14)
- Francesco Giacci (1900.09.26 – 1904.07.03) as Auxiliary Bishop of Diocese of Frascati (Italy) (1900.09.26 – 1904.07.03); next Bishop of Marsi (Italy) (1904.07.03 – 1909.04.29), emeritate as Titular Bishop of Philomelium (1909.04.29 – death 1929.02.20)
- Giovanni Battista Arista, Oratorians (C.O.) (1904.11.14 – 1907.11.04) as Auxiliary Bishop of Diocese of Acireale (Italy) (1904.11.14 – 1907.11.04); next succeeded as Bishop of Acireale (1907.11.04 – death 1920.09.27)
- Laureano Vérez de Acevedo (Spaniard), Jesuit Order (S.J.) (1908.08.22 – death 1920.01.31), no actual prelature
- Jules-Alexandre Cusin (1920.03.08 – 1929.05.29) as Coadjutor Bishop of Diocese of Mende (France) (1920.03.08 – 1929.05.29); next succeeded as Bishop of Mende (1929.05.29 – 1937.06.05)
- Adriano Bernareggi (1931.12.16 – 1936.04.14) as Coadjutor Bishop of Bergamo (Italy) (1931.12.16 – 1936.04.14); next succeeded as Bishop of Bergamo (1936.04.14 – 1953.06.28), emeritate ('promoted') as Archbishop ad personam (1953 – death 1953.06.28)
- Biagio Budelacci (1936.06.18 – death 1973.08.27) as Auxiliary Bishop of Diocese of Frascati (Italy) (1936.06.18 – 1962) and on emeritate
- Roman Danylak (1992.12.16 – death 2012.10.07) as Apostolic Administrator sede plena of Toronto of the Ukrainians (Canada) (1992.12.16 – 1998.06.16) and on emeritate.
