= Corrado Pizziolo =

Italian prelate of the Roman Catholic Church

The Most Reverend Corrado Pizziolo
- Bishop Emeritus of Vittorio Veneto
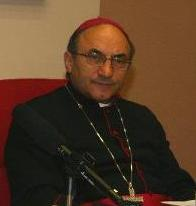
- Church: Roman Catholic Church
- Diocese: Vittorio Veneto
- See: Vittorio Veneto
- Appointed: 19 November 2007
- Term ended: 30 December 2024
- Predecessor: Giuseppe Zenti

Orders
- Ordination: 20 September 1975 by Antonio Mistrorigo
- Consecration: 26 January 2008 by Andrea Bruno Mazzocato

Personal details
- Born: Corrado Pizziolo; 23 December 1949 (age 76) Scandolara di Zero Branco, Italy
- Denomination: Catholic (Latin Rite)
- Education: Theological University of Northern Italy
- Motto: Omnia propter evangelium
- Coat of arms

Styles of Corrado Pizziolo
- Reference style: The Most Reverend
- Spoken style: Your Excellency
- Religious style: Monsignor

Corrado Pizziolo (born 23 December 1949) is an Italian prelate of the Roman Catholic Church. He served as Bishop of Vittorio Veneto from 2007 to 2024.

== Biography ==
Corrado Pizziolo was born in Scandolara di Zero Branco, and studied at the minor and major seminaries in Treviso. He was ordained to the priesthood on 20 September 1975 and then served as parochial vicar of the parish of San Martino di Lupari until 1981. From 1981 to 1985, he was an assistant of the Major Seminary of Treviso. Pizziolo continued his studies at the Theological Faculty of Northern Italy, from where he later obtained his licentiate in theology.

In 1985, he became professor of dogmatic theology at the Interdiocesan Theological Institute of Treviso-Vittorio Veneto and at the School of Theology for Laymen in Treviso. After being appointed to the Permanent Formation of Young Clergy in 1994, Pizziolo was named episcopal vicar for the diocesan synod in 1998, episcopal delegate for the Permanent Formation of the Clergy in 1999, and vicar general of and curial moderator of the Diocese of Treviso in 2002. He was also made a canon of the cathedral chapter in 2001 and chaired the Commission for the Permanent Diaconate and the Administrative Council of the House of Clergy in Treviso.

In September 2007, following the centennial anniversary of Pascendi dominici gregis of Pope Pius X, he emphasized the relevance of Pope Pius's claims against Modernism to current times, saying, "it must also be affirmed that many of the solutions proposed [by the Modernists] were not compatible with the Catholic faith. This led to the need for intervention by the Magisterium".

On 19 November 2007 Pizziolo was appointed Bishop of Vittorio Veneto by Pope Benedict XVI. He received his episcopal consecration on 26 January 2008 from Bishop Andrea Bruno Mazzocato, with Bishops Paolo Magnani and Alfredo Magarotto serving as co-consecrators. As a motto, he chose Omnia propter evangelium ("All for the Gospel").

On 30 December 2024, Pizziolo was succeeded by Riccardo Battochio as the new Bishop of Vittorio Veneto.

Catholic Church titles
| Preceded by Giuseppe Zenti | Bishop of Vittorio Veneto; 2007 – 2024 | Succeeded by vacant |
