= Zero Branco =

- Comune
- Comune di Zero Branco
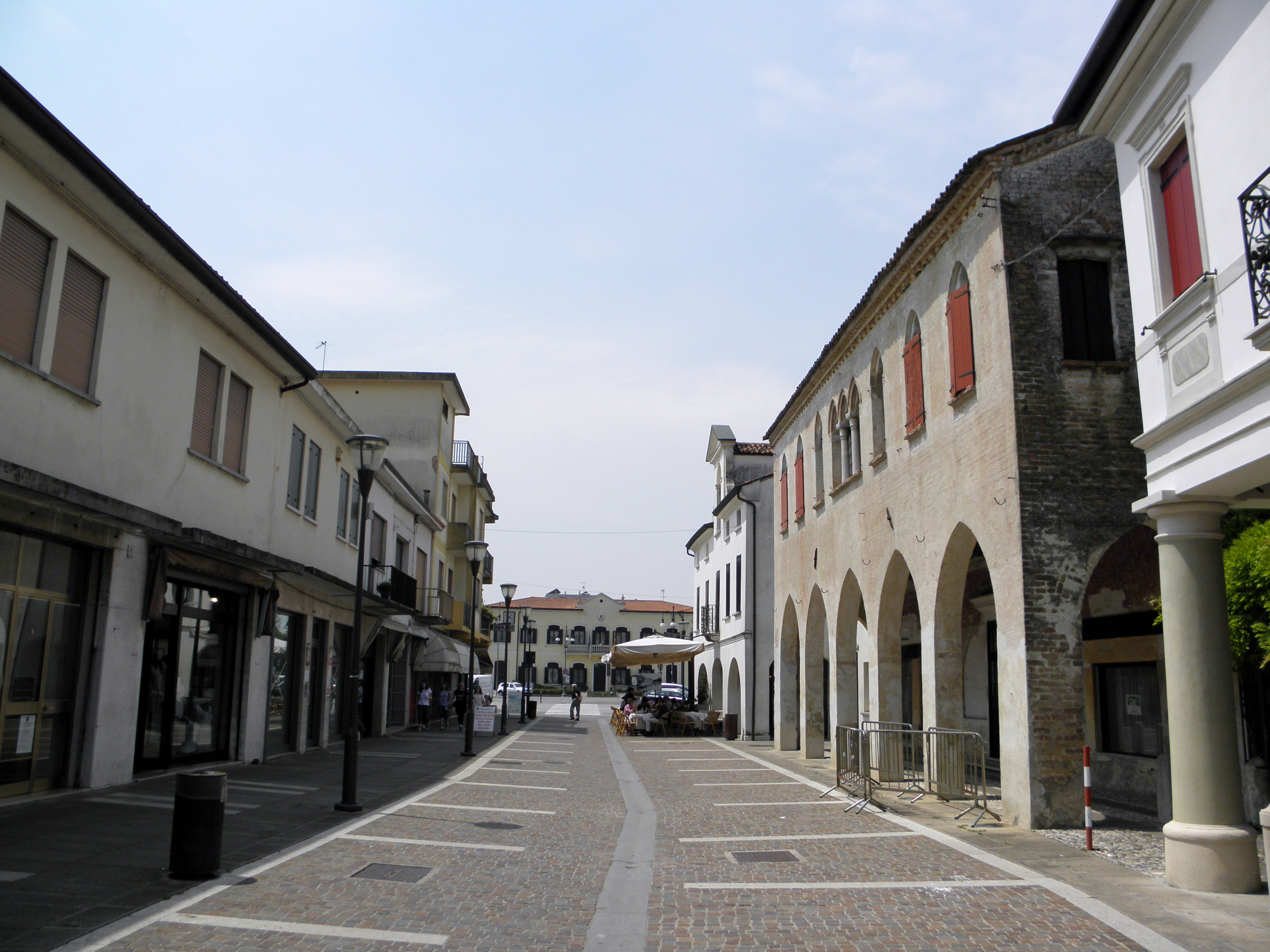
- Via Martiri della Libertà.

- Coat of arms

- Location within Italy Location within Veneto
- Coordinates: 45°36′N 12°10′E
- Country: Italy
- Region: Veneto
- Province: Treviso (TV)
- Frazioni: Sant'Alberto, Scandolara

Government
  - Mayor: Luca Durighetto

Area
  - Total: 26.1 km^{2} (10.1 sq mi)
- Elevation: 7 m (23 ft)

Population (31 December 2015)
  - Total: 11,261
  - Density: 431/km^{2} (1,120/sq mi)
- Demonym: Zerotini
- Time zone: UTC+1 (CET)
  - Summer (DST): UTC+2 (CEST)
- Postal code: 31059
- Dialing code: 0422
- Website: Official website

Zero Branco is a comune (municipality) in the Province of Treviso in the Italian region Veneto, located about 20 kilometres (12 mi) northwest of Venice and about 10 kilometres (6 mi) southwest of Treviso.

== Geography ==
Zero Branco borders the following municipalities: Mogliano Veneto, Morgano, Piombino Dese, Preganziol, Quinto di Treviso, Scorzè, Trebaseleghe and Treviso.

== Notable people ==
- Gaetano Cozzi (1922–2001), historian, professor at Padua University
- Gilberto Parlotti (1940–1972) professional motorcycle racer, died while racing at the 1972 Isle of Man TT
- Corrado Pizziolo (born 1949), prelate of the Roman Catholic Church; Bishop of Vittorio Veneto.
- Simone Favaro (born 1988), rugby union player
