= Barisoni =

Barisoni may refer to:

- Albertino Barisoni (died 1667), Roman Catholic Bishop of Ceneda
- Giuseppe Barisoni (1853-1931), Italian painter and engraver, active in Venice
- Barison, settlement of the City Municipality of Koper, Slovenia
