= Euprepius of Verona =

Bishop of Verona

Saint Euprepius of Verona

Bishop
- Died: End of the 1st century or beginning of the 2nd century
- Venerated in: Roman Catholic Church, Orthodox Church
- Major shrine: Basilica of San Zeno, Verona
- Feast: 21 August

Saint Euprepius of Verona (Euprepus, Puprepis) is venerated as the first bishop of Verona. Not much is known of his life beyond the fact that his name was Greek (from the Greek words eu, "well", and prepein, "adapted, suited"), which is considered evidence of the antiquity of the Veronese see.

== Background ==
According to the local tradition of Verona, he was one of the Seventy Disciples mentioned in the Gospel of Luke 10:1–24, but this is "entirely unsubstantiated." and his name does not appear among the seventy in the 2nd-century list compiled by Hippolytus of Rome. Local tradition states that Euprepius was bishop of Verona from 60 to 72 AD. Euprepius' death may have occurred at the end of the 1st century or beginning of the 2nd century.

The 9th century Versus de Verona of Anno, Bishop of Verona, which discusses the period in which Verona was converted from paganism to Christianity, states: Primum Verona predicavit Puprepis episcopus (v. 40). This work, also known as the Carmen Pipinianum, includes a description of Verona and its churches, and gives a list of the first eight bishops: Euprepius, Dimidrianus (Demetrianus), Simplicius, Proculus, Saturninus, Lucilius (Lucillus, Lucius), Gricinus, and Zeno. According to the Catholic Encyclopedia, "the period of St. Euprepius, and therefore of the erection of the see, must be placed not before the peace given to the Church under Gallienus (260), but rather under the first period of the reign of Diocletian, when the Church enjoyed peace."

The reconstruction of the chronology of bishops from the altar cover from San Firmo e Rustico in Verona known as the Velo di Classe (which dates from the end of the 8th century or beginning of the 9th), places Euprepius first in the list of bishops of Verona. His feast day in the Martyrologium Romanum is 21 August.

== Veneration ==
Euprepius' cult did not gain much popularity until the 14th century. In 1492, his relics, along with those of other Veronese bishop saints, were rediscovered in the pieve of San Procolo. The relics were translated to the ancient basilica of San Zeno in 1806, where an inscription on the altar reads: Euprepio Veronae a Christi ann. LXXII praesuli primo. In the 16th century, Domenico Riccio (Domenico Brusasorci) painted a series of portraits of the bishops of Verona, ranging from Euprepius to one of Cardinal Agostino Valerio for the Palazzo del Vescovado di Verona. Francis Turner Palgrave remarked in the 19th century that "of course the greater number are imaginary, and therefore as uninteresting as possible; but the artist has given his subjects expression and variety."

In 1961 the Sacred Congregation of Rites, in accordance with a proposal of the bishop of Verona, Giuseppe Carraro, joined the bishop saints of Verona under a single feast day (October 30), although Euprepius' separate feast day (August 21) was conserved due to the fact that he was the city's first bishop.
