= Pizziolo =

Pizziolo is a surname. Notable people with the surname include:

- Corrado Pizziolo (born 1949), prelate in the Roman Catholic Church
- Mario Pizziolo (1909–1990), Italian footballer and manager
