= Marco Giustiniani (bishop of Verona) =

17th-century Roman Catholic prelate

Most Reverend Marco Giustiniani
- Bishop of Verona
- Church: Catholic Church
- Diocese: Diocese of Verona
- In office: 1631–1649
- Predecessor: Alberto Valier
- Successor: Sebastiano Pisani (seniore)

Personal details
- Died: 23 April 1649 Verona, Italy

Marco Giustiniani (died 23 April 1649) was a Roman Catholic prelate who served as Bishop of Verona (1631–1649), Bishop of Ceneda (1625–1631), and Bishop of Torcello (1625).

== Biography ==
On 3 March 1625, Marco Giustiniani was appointed during the papacy of Pope Urban VIII as Bishop of Torcello. On 27 October 1625, he was appointed during the papacy of Pope Urban VIII as Bishop of Ceneda. On 7 April 1631, he was appointed during the papacy of Pope Urban VIII as Bishop of Verona. He served as Bishop of Verona until his death on 23 April 1649.

== External links and additional sources ==
- Cheney, David M. "Diocese of Torcello (Turris)". Catholic-Hierarchy.org. (for Chronology of Bishops) ^{[self-published]}
- Chow, Gabriel. "Titular Episcopal See of Torcello (Italy)". GCatholic.org. (for Chronology of Bishops) ^{[self-published]}
- Cheney, David M. "Diocese of Vittorio Veneto (Ceneda)". Catholic-Hierarchy.org. (for Chronology of Bishops) ^{[self-published]}
- Chow, Gabriel. "Diocese of Vittorio Veneto (Ceneda) (Italy)". GCatholic.org. (for Chronology of Bishops) ^{[self-published]}
- Cheney, David M. "Diocese of Verona". Catholic-Hierarchy.org. (for Chronology of Bishops) ^{[self-published]}
- Chow, Gabriel. "Diocese of Verona". GCatholic.org. (for Chronology of Bishops) ^{[self-published]}

Catholic Church titles
Preceded by Zaccaria della Vecchia	Bishop of Torcello; 1625	Succeeded by Marco Zeno
Preceded by Pietro Valier	Bishop of Ceneda; 1625–1631	Succeeded by Marcantonio Bragadin
Preceded by Alberto Valier	Bishop of Verona; 1631–1649	Succeeded by Sebastiano Pisani (seniore)
