= Angelo Barbarigo =

Roman Catholic Cardinal

Angelo Barbarigo (1350-1418) was a Roman Catholic Cardinal.

Catholic Church titles
| Preceded by | Bishop of Kisamos; 1383–1406 | Succeeded by |
| Preceded by | Bishop of Verona; 1406–1409 | Succeeded by Guido Memo |
| Preceded by | Cardinal-Priest of Santi Marcellino e Pietro; 1408–1415 | Succeeded by |
| Preceded by Antonio Calvi | Cardinal-Priest of Santa Prassede; 1415–1418 | Succeeded by Jean Le Jeune |
