= Flavio Roberto Carraro =

Italian Roman Catholic prelate (1932–2022)

The Most Reverend Flavio Roberto Carraro
- Bishop Emeritus of Verona
- Diocese: Verona
- Appointed: 25 July 1998
- Term ended: 8 May 2007
- Predecessor: Attilio Nicora
- Successor: Giuseppe Zenti
- Previous posts: Minister General of Order of Friars Minor Capuchin (1982–1994); Bishop of Arezzo-Cortona-Sansepolcro (1996–1998)

Orders
- Ordination: 16 March 1957 by Angelo Guiseppe Roncalli
- Consecration: 7 August 1996 by Silvano Piovanelli

Personal details
- Born: 3 February 1932 Sandon di Fossò, Italy
- Died: 17 June 2022 (aged 90) Conegliano, Italy
- Motto: FATE QUELLO CHE GESÚ VI DIRÁ
- Coat of arms

Styles of Flavio Roberto Carraro
- Reference style: His Excellency; The Most Reverend
- Spoken style: Your Excellency
- Religious style: Bishop

Flavio Roberto Carraro (3 February 1932 – 17 June 2022) was an Italian Roman Catholic prelate.

Carraro was born in Italy and was ordained to the priesthood in 1957. He served as bishop of the Roman Catholic Diocese of Arezzo-Cortona-Sansepolcro, Italy, from 1996 to 1998 and as bishop of the Roman Catholic Diocese of Verona, Italy from 1998 until his retirement in 2007.

Catholic Church titles
Preceded by Attilio Nicora	Bishop of Verona; 1998–2007	Succeeded by Giuseppe Zenti
Preceded by Giovanni D’Ascenzi	Bishop of Arezzo-Cortona-Sansepolcro; 1996–1998	Succeeded by Gualtiero Bassetti
Preceded by Johannes Franciscus Maria Schutijser	Minister General of Order of Friars Minor Capuchin; 1982–1994	Succeeded by John Dennis Corriveau
