= Francesco Brevio =

Most Reverend Francesco Brevio
- Bishop of Ceneda
- Church: Catholic Church
- Diocese: Diocese of Ceneda
- In office: 1498–1508
- Predecessor: Nicolò Trevisan
- Successor: Marino Grimani

Personal details
- Died: 7 August 1508 Ceneda, Italy

Francesco Brevio (died 1508) was a Roman Catholic prelate who served as Bishop of Ceneda (1498–1508).

== Biography ==
On 19 Jan 1498, Francesco Brevio was appointed Bishop of Ceneda by Pope Alexander VI. He served as Bishop of Ceneda until his death on 7 Aug 1508.

== External links and additional sources ==
- Cheney, David M. "Diocese of Vittorio Veneto (Ceneda)". Catholic-Hierarchy.org. (for Chronology of Bishops) ^{[self-published]}
- Chow, Gabriel. "Diocese of Vittorio Veneto (Ceneda)(Italy)". GCatholic.org. (for Chronology of Bishops) ^{[self-published]}

Catholic Church titles
Preceded by Nicolò Trevisan	Bishop of Ceneda; 1498–1508	Succeeded by Marino Grimani
