= Marcantonio Bragadin (cardinal) =

Italian cardinal

- cardinal priest of San Marco
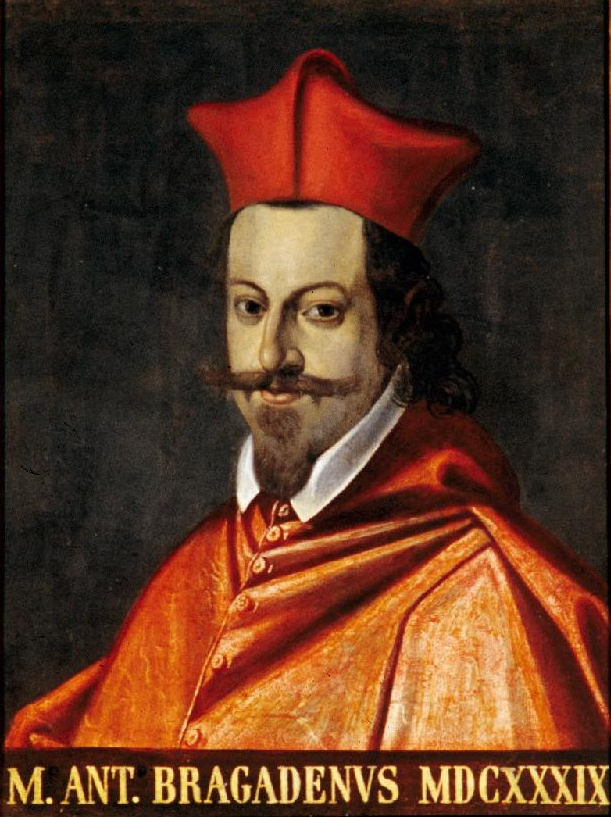
- Church: Catholic Church
- See: Bishop of Vicenza
- Appointed: 3 October 1639
- Term ended: 14 October 1655
- Predecessor: Luca Stella
- Successor: Giovanni Battista Brescia
- Other posts: Bishop of Crema, Bishop of Ceneda

Orders
- Consecration: 21 December 1629 (Bishop) by Antonio Marcello Barberini
- Created cardinal: 16 December 1641 by Pope Urban VIII

Personal details
- Born: 1591 Venezia
- Died: March 28, 1658 (aged 66–67) Rome
- Buried: San Marco, Rome

Marcantonio Bragadin (1591 – 28 March 1658) was a Venetian Catholic cardinal who served as Bishop of Vicenza.

== Life ==
Marcantonio Bragadin was born in Venice in 1591 (other sources indicate 1590 or 1594). His grandfather was Marco Antonio Bragadin, famous for having been flayed alive after the Ottoman conquest of Famagusta in 1571. His father, Antonio, had been one of the leaders of the Council of Ten in 1607.

Marcantonio completed his studies earning a doctorate in utroque iure. He initially took the political career in the Republic of Venice, but already in 1624 moved to Rome and became an ecclesiastic: on 28 September 1626 he was ordained priest. He took up a career in the administration of the Papal States: on 17 March 1627 he became referendary of the Tribunals of the Apostolic Signature, in April to December 1627, he was governor of Fabriano, then in 1628 governor of Sabina and later of Narni.

On 3 December 1630, Bragadin was appointed Bishop of Crema, which was a Venetian inland province. The episcopal consecration followed on 21 December in the Sistine Chapel by the hands of Antonio Marcello Barberini. Already on 12 January 1633, Bragadin was moved to the Diocese of Ceneda, nearer to Venice. In Ceneda, he succeeded to keep exempt the town from the taxation over the near Treviso, and in 1634, he issued a ban prohibiting the insults to the Jews during the processions.

On 3 October 1639, he was promoted bishop of Vicenza. On 16 December 1641, he was created Cardinal priest with the title of Santi Nereo e Achilleo, which was later, on 19 November 1646, modified in the title of San Marco, the usual title of the most prominent Venetian Cardinal in Rome. He participated to the Papal conclave, 1644.

As bishop of Vicenza, he held two synods in May 1647 and April 1642. According to a contemporary, his life was exemplar and pure. A few months after the Papal conclave, 1655, he resigned as bishop of Vicenza in order to stay in Rome to support the politic of the Republic of Venice, of which he always remained a loyal servant. In particular during the Fifth Ottoman-Venetian War he persuaded the Pope to exhort various Western European nations to send men, ships and supplies to defend Crete. In exchange to this effort the Pope requested and obtained, due to mediation of Bragadin, the re-admission in 1657 of the Jesuits in Venice from where they had been expelled in 1606 for effect of the Venetian Interdict.

Marcantonio Bragadin died in Rome on 28 March 1658 and was buried in the Basilica di San Marco.

== Episcopal succession ==
Episcopal succession of Marcantonio Bragadin

While bishop, he was the principal consecrator of:

- Jacobus Philippus Tomasini, Bishop of Novigrad (1642);
- Giorgio Cornaro, Bishop of Padua (1642);
- Francesco Manola, Bishop of Korčula (1643);
- Marco Antonio Martinengo, Bishop of Torcello (1643);
- Baldassarre Bonifazio, Bishop of Capodistria (1653);
- Francesco de Andreis (Andronico), Bishop of Nona (1653);
- Mauritii Doria, Bishop of Tinos and Mykonos (1654);
- Pietro Vito Ottoboni, Bishop of Brescia (1654);
- Giovanni Battista Brescia, Bishop of Caorle (1655);
- Pietro Martire Rusca, Titular Bishop of Famagusta (1656); and
- Gregorio Giovanni Gasparo Barbarigo, Bishop of Bergamo (1657).

and the principal co-consecrator of:

- Francesco Arcudio, Bishop of Nusco (1639); and
- Sebastiano Pisani (seniore), Bishop of Ceneda (1639).

== See also ==
- Catholic Church in Italy
