= Bartolomeo Bacilieri =

Italian Catholic cardinal

His Eminence Bartolomeo Bacilieri
- Bishop of Verona
- Church: Roman Catholic Church
- Diocese: Verona
- See: Verona
- Appointed: 12 March 1900
- Term ended: 14 February 1923
- Predecessor: Luigi di Canossa
- Successor: Girolamo Cardinale
- Other post: Cardinal-Priest of San Bartolomeo all'Isola (1901-23)
- Previous posts: Titular Bishop of Nyssa (1888-1900); Coadjutor Bishop of Verona (1888-1900)

Orders
- Ordination: 17 December 1864
- Consecration: 10 June 1888 by Mariano Rampolla del Tindaro
- Created cardinal: 15 April 1901 by Pope Leo XIII
- Rank: Cardinal-Priest

Personal details
- Born: Bartolomeo Bacilieri; 28 March 1842 Breonio, Fumane, Kingdom of Lombardy–Venetia
- Died: 14 February 1923 (aged 80) Verona, Kingdom of Italy
- Buried: Verona Cathedral
- Education: Almo Collegio Capranica
- Coat of arms

Styles of Bartolomeo Bacilieri
- Reference style: His Eminence
- Spoken style: Your Eminence
- Informal style: Cardinal
- See: Verona

Bartolomeo Bacilieri (28 March 1842 – 14 February 1923) was an Italian Cardinal of the Roman Catholic Church. He served as Bishop of Verona from 1900 until his death, and was elevated to the cardinalate in 1901.

== Biography ==
Bartolomeo Bacilieri was born in Breonio, Fumane, and received the Sacrament of Confirmation on 4 July 1854. He studied at the seminary in Verona and at the Almo Collegio Capranica (1862–1867) in Rome. On 17 December 1864, Bacilieri was ordained to the priesthood in Rome. He then furthered his studies at the Collegio Romano, from where he obtained his doctorate in theology on 30 July 1867. Bacilieri taught dogmatic theology at the Seminary of Verona from 1868 to 1888, and was also named as its rector in 1878. He was a canon of the cathedral chapter (1878–1888), and served as diocesan prosynodal examiner as well.

On 1 June 1888, Bacilieri was appointed Coadjutor Bishop of Verona and Titular Bishop of Nisa in Lycia. He received his episcopal consecration on the following 10 June from Cardinal Mariano Rampolla, with Archbishops Alessandro Sanminiatelli and Vincenzo Vannutelli serving as co-consecrators, in the chapel of the Almo Collegio Capranica. Bacilieri later succeeded Cardinal Luigi di Canossa as Bishop of Verona upon the latter's death on 12 March 1900.

Pope Leo XIII created him Cardinal Priest of San Bartolomeo all'Isola in the consistory of 15 April 1901. After participating in the conclave of 1903, Bacilieri was a cardinal elector again in the 1914 papal conclave, which selected Pope Benedict XV. During the conclave of 1914, Bacilieri supposedly received two votes in the opening ballot, and served as a scrutineer on the last day of balloting with Cardinals Ottavio Cagiano de Azevedo and Rafael Merry del Val. He later participated in the 1922 papal conclave as well, which resulted in the election of Pope Pius XI.

The Cardinal died in Verona at the age of 80. His funeral was held on 17 February 1923 at the Cathedral of Verona, and was attended by Cardinal Pietro La Fontaine and almost all of the region's bishops. His remains were interred in the tomb of the canons of the cathedral chapter in the Verona cemetery until a definitive tomb at the cathedral was completed.

== External links and additional sources ==
- Cheney, David M. "Diocese of Verona". Catholic-Hierarchy.org. (for Chronology of Bishops)^{self-published}
- Chow, Gabriel. "Diocese of Verona". GCatholic.org. (for Chronology of Bishops)^{self-published}
- Catholic-Hierarchy ^{[self-published]}
- Cardinals of the Holy Roman Church

Catholic Church titles
Preceded by Luigi di Canossa	Bishop of Verona; 1900–1923	Succeeded by Girolamo Cardinale
