= Apostolic Nunciature to Uruguay =

Diplomatic mission of the Holy See in South America

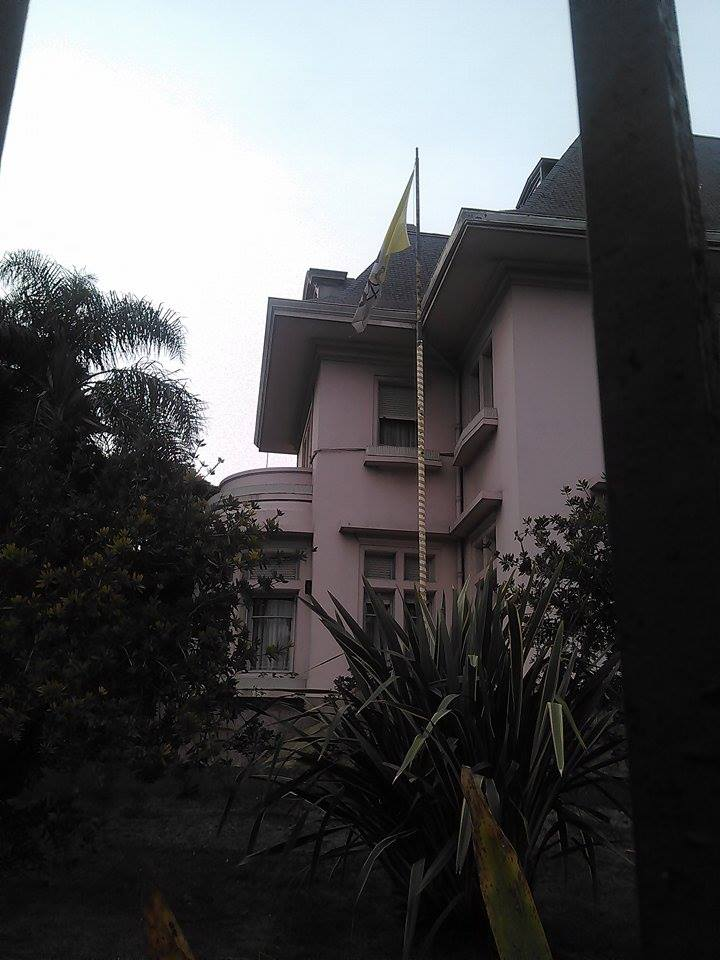
- Location: Montevideo
- Apostolic Nuncio: Archbishop Martin Krebs

The Apostolic Nunciature to Uruguay is an ecclesiastical office of the Catholic Church in Uruguay. It is a diplomatic post of the Holy See, whose representative is called the Apostolic Nuncio with the rank of an ambassador.

Pope Pius XII established the Nunciature to Uruguay on 10 November 1939 after more than thirty years without any representation of the Holy See there.

== List of papal representatives ==
Apostolic Delegates

- Vincenzo Massoni (26 September 1856 - 3 June 1857 Died)
- Marino Marini (14 August 1857 - 27 March 1865)
- Angelo Di Pietro (31 December 1877 - 30 September 1879)
- Luigi Matera (19 September 1879 - 14 October 1884)
- Antonio Sabatucci (24 October 1900 - 9 November 1906)

Apostolic Nuncios

- Albert Levame (12 November 1939 - 3 October 1949)
- Alfredo Pacini (23 April 1949 - 4 February 1960)
- Raffaele Forni (27 February 1960 - 23 October 1965)
- Alfredo Bruniera (23 October 1965 - 23 April 1969)
- Augustin-Joseph Sépinski (5 May 1969 - 29 July 1975)
- Luigi Bellotti (2 September 1975 - 27 October 1981)
- Franco Brambilla (21 November 1981 - 22 February 1986)
- Andrea Cordero Lanza di Montezemolo (1 April 1986 - 28 May 1990)
- Francesco De Nittis (25 June 1990 - August 1999)
- Janusz Bolonek (11 November 1999 - 24 May 2008)
- Anselmo Guido Pecorari (24 May 2008 - 25 April 2014)
- George Panikulam (14 June 2014 - October 2017)
- Martin Krebs (16 June 2018 – 3 March 2021)
- Luciano Russo (18 December 2021 - 10 September 2022)
- Gianfranco Gallone (3 January 2023 - present)

== See also ==
- Foreign relations of the Holy See
- List of heads of the diplomatic missions of the Holy See
