= Pietro Leoni (bishop) =

Most Reverend Pietro Leoni
- Bishop of Verona
- Church: Catholic Church
- Diocese: Diocese of Verona
- In office: 1691–1697
- Predecessor: Sebastiano Pisani (iuniore)
- Successor: Giovanni Francesco Barbarigo
- Previous post: Bishop of Ceneda (1667–1691)

Orders
- Ordination: 25 September 1667
- Consecration: 20 November 1667 by Pietro Vito Ottoboni

Personal details
- Born: 2 April 1637 Venice, Italy
- Died: 17 December 1697 (age 60) Verona, Italy

Pietro Leoni (2 April 1637 – 17 December 1697) was a Roman Catholic prelate who served as Bishop of Verona (1691–1697) and Bishop of Ceneda (1667–1691).

== Biography ==
Pietro Leoni was born in Venice, Italy on 2 April 1637 and ordained a priest on 25 September 1667. On 14 November 1667, he was appointed during the papacy of Pope Clement IX as Bishop of Ceneda. On 20 November 1667, he was consecrated bishop by Pietro Vito Ottoboni, Cardinal-Priest of San Marco, with Carlo Stefano Anastasio Ciceri, Bishop of Alessandria della Paglia, and Francesco Grassi, Bishop of Nona, serving as co-consecrators. On 26 November 1691, he was appointed during the papacy of Pope Innocent XII as Bishop of Verona. He served as Bishop of Verona until his death on 17 December 1697.

== Episcopal succession ==
While bishop, he was the principal consecrator of:

- Giacomo Bruti, Bishop of Novigrad (1671);
- Alessandro Adezario, Bishop of Poreč (1671);

and the principal co-consecrator of:

- Gianalberto Badoer, Patriarch of Venice (1688).

== External links and additional sources ==
- Cheney, David M. "Diocese of Vittorio Veneto (Ceneda)". Catholic-Hierarchy.org. (for Chronology of Bishops) ^{[self-published]}
- Chow, Gabriel. "Diocese of Vittorio Veneto (Ceneda)(Italy)". GCatholic.org. (for Chronology of Bishops) ^{[self-published]}
- Cheney, David M. "Diocese of Verona". Catholic-Hierarchy.org. (for Chronology of Bishops) ^{[self-published]}
- Chow, Gabriel. "Diocese of Verona". GCatholic.org. (for Chronology of Bishops) ^{[self-published]}

Catholic Church titles
Preceded by Albertino Barisoni	Bishop of Ceneda; 1667–1691	Succeeded by Marcantonio Agazzi
Preceded by Sebastiano Pisani (iuniore)	Bishop of Verona; 1691–1697	Succeeded by Giovanni Francesco Barbarigo
