= Nicolò Trevisan =

Roman Catholic prelate and Bishop of Ceneda

Most Reverend Nicolò Trevisa
- Bishop of Ceneda
- Church: Catholic Church
- Diocese: Diocese of Ceneda
- In office: 1474–1498
- Predecessor: Pietro Leon
- Successor: Francesco Brevio

Personal details
- Died: 10 January 1498 Ceneda, Italy

Nicolò Trevisa (died 1498) was a Roman Catholic prelate who served as Bishop of Ceneda from 1474 until his death on 10 June 1498. He was appointed on 15 June 1474 during the papacy of Pope Sixtus IV.

== External links and additional sources ==
- Cheney, David M. "Diocese of Vittorio Veneto (Ceneda)". Catholic-Hierarchy.org. (for Chronology of Bishops) ^{[self-published]}
- Chow, Gabriel. "Diocese of Vittorio Veneto (Ceneda)(Italy)". GCatholic.org. (for Chronology of Bishops) ^{[self-published]}

Catholic Church titles
Preceded by Pietro Leon	Bishop of Ceneda; 1474–1498	Succeeded by Francesco Brevio
