= Alfredo Magarotto =

Italian priest and theologian (1927–2021)

- Bishop of Vittorio Veneto
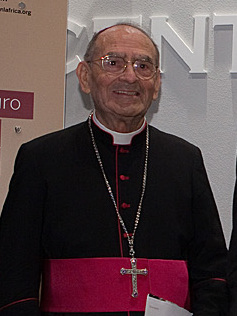
- Church: Catholic Church
- Diocese: Diocese of Vittorio Veneto
- In office: 31 May 1997 – 3 December 2003
- Predecessor: Eugenio Ravignani
- Successor: Giuseppe Zenti
- Other post: Administrator of Vittorio Veneto (2007-2008)
- Previous post: Bishop of Choggia (1990-1997)Administrator of Padua (1989)

Orders
- Ordination: 9 July 1950
- Consecration: 24 March 1990 by Bernardin Gantin

Personal details
- Born: 16 February 1927 Pernumia, Province of Padua, Kingdom of Italy
- Died: 22 January 2021 (aged 93) Sarmeola, Rubano, Veneto, Italy

Alfredo Magarotto (16 February 1927 – 22 January 2021) was an Italian Roman Catholic bishop.

Magarotto was born in Italy and was ordained to the priesthood in 1950. He served as bishop of the Roman Catholic Diocese of Chioggia, Italy, from 1990 to 1997 and as bishop of the Roman Catholic Diocese of Vittorio Veneto, Italy, from 1997 to 2003. He returned briefly after retirement to the Roman Catholic Diocese of Vittorio Veneto in the year 2007 as diocesan Administrator.
