= Luigi Bellotti =

Italian diplomat of the Holy See

- Titular Archbishop of Voncariana; Apostolic Nuncio
- Previous posts: Apostolic Delegate to Central West Africa (1964–1969); Apostolic Pro-Nuncio to Uganda (1969–1975); Apostolic Nuncio to Uruguay; (1975–1981); Apostolic Pro-Nuncio to Finland (1981–1985); Apostolic Pro-Nuncio to Iceland (1981–1985); Apostolic Delegate to Scandinavia (1981–1985); Apostolic Pro-Nuncio to Denmark (1982–1985); Apostolic Pro-Nuncio to Norway (1982–1985); Apostolic Pro-Nuncio to Sweden (1982–1985)

Orders
- Ordination: 11 July 1937
- Consecration: 4 October 1964 by Giuseppe Carraro

Personal details
- Born: 17 March 1914
- Died: September 23, 1995 (aged 81)
- Occupation: Catholic prelate and diplomat

Luigi Bellotti (17 March 1914 – 23 September 1995) was an Italian prelate of the Catholic Church who spent his career in the diplomatic service of the Holy See. He was made an archbishop in 1964 and led diplomatic missions first in Africa and later in Uruguay and then in several Scandinavian countries.

== Biography ==
Luigi Bellotti was born in Verona on 17 March 1914. He was ordained a priest on 11 July 1937.

To prepare for a diplomatic career, he entered the Pontifical Ecclesiastical Academy in 1942. He then entered the diplomatic service of the Holy See. His study of the excommunication of Communists and fascists was published in 1949. His early assignments included a stint in the late 1950s as councilor in the Apostolic Internunciature to Turkey.

On 18 July 1964 Pope Paul VI named him titular archbishop of Voncariana and Apostolic Delegate to Central Western Africa. (Note: The Delegation to Central-Western Africa was responsible for Nigeria, Cameroon, Gabon, Oubangui-Chari, and Chad.) He received his episcopal consecration on 4 October 1964 from Giuseppe Carraro, bishop of Verona. In that post, he convinced Francis Arinze, later a cardinal, that he had been chosen to be an auxiliary bishop. He participated as a council father in the third and fourth sessions of the Second Vatican Council.

On 27 November 1969 he was named Apostolic Pro-Nuncio to Uganda. During his time there, in October 1973, Ugandan President Idi Amin accused him of being a spy for the United States Central Intelligence Agency, that he was traveling throughout the country without authorization and spreading rumors to discredit the government.

He was named Apostolic Nuncio to Uruguay on 3 September 1975.

On 27 October 1981, Pope John Paul II appointed Bellotti Pro-Nuncio to Iceland and to Finland, as well as Apostolic Delegate to Scandinavia. On 2 October 1982, in anticipation of the establishment of diplomatic relations between the Holy See and the three nations involved, his appointment as delegate ended and he became Pro-Nuncio to Denmark, to Norway, and to Sweden.

He was replaced in these diplomatic posts on 31 October 1985 by Archbishop Henri Lemaître and died on 23 September 1995.

His personal papers are held by the historical archives of the Church of Verona.

A street in Verona is named for him: Via Mons. Luigi Bellotti.

== See also ==
- Apostolic Nunciature to the Nordic Countries
