= Leonardo Mocenigo =

Most Reverend Leonardo Mocenigo
- Bishop of Ceneda
- Church: Catholic Church
- Diocese: Diocese of Ceneda
- In office: 1599–1623
- Predecessor: Marco Antonio Mocenigo
- Successor: Pietro Valier

Orders
- Consecration: 1599 by Pope Clement VIII

Personal details
- Died: 20 May 1623 Ceneda, Italy

Leonardo Mocenigo (died 1623) was a Roman Catholic prelate who served as Bishop of Ceneda (1599–1623).

== Biography ==
On 3 January 1599, Leonardo Mocenigo was appointed during the papacy of Pope Clement VIII as Bishop of Ceneda. In 1599, he was consecrated bishop by Pope Clement VIII. He served as Bishop of Ceneda until his death on 20 May 1623. While bishop, he was the principal co-consecrator of Giovanni Delfino (camerlengo), Bishop of Vicenza (1603).

== External links and additional sources ==
- Cheney, David M. "Diocese of Vittorio Veneto (Ceneda)". Catholic-Hierarchy.org. (for Chronology of Bishops) ^{[self-published]}
- Chow, Gabriel. "Diocese of Vittorio Veneto (Ceneda)(Italy)". GCatholic.org. (for Chronology of Bishops) ^{[self-published]}

Catholic Church titles
Preceded by Marco Antonio Mocenigo	Bishop of Ceneda; 1599–1623	Succeeded by Pietro Valier
