= Luigi di Canossa =

Catholic cardinal

His Eminence Luigi di Canossa
- Bishop of Verona
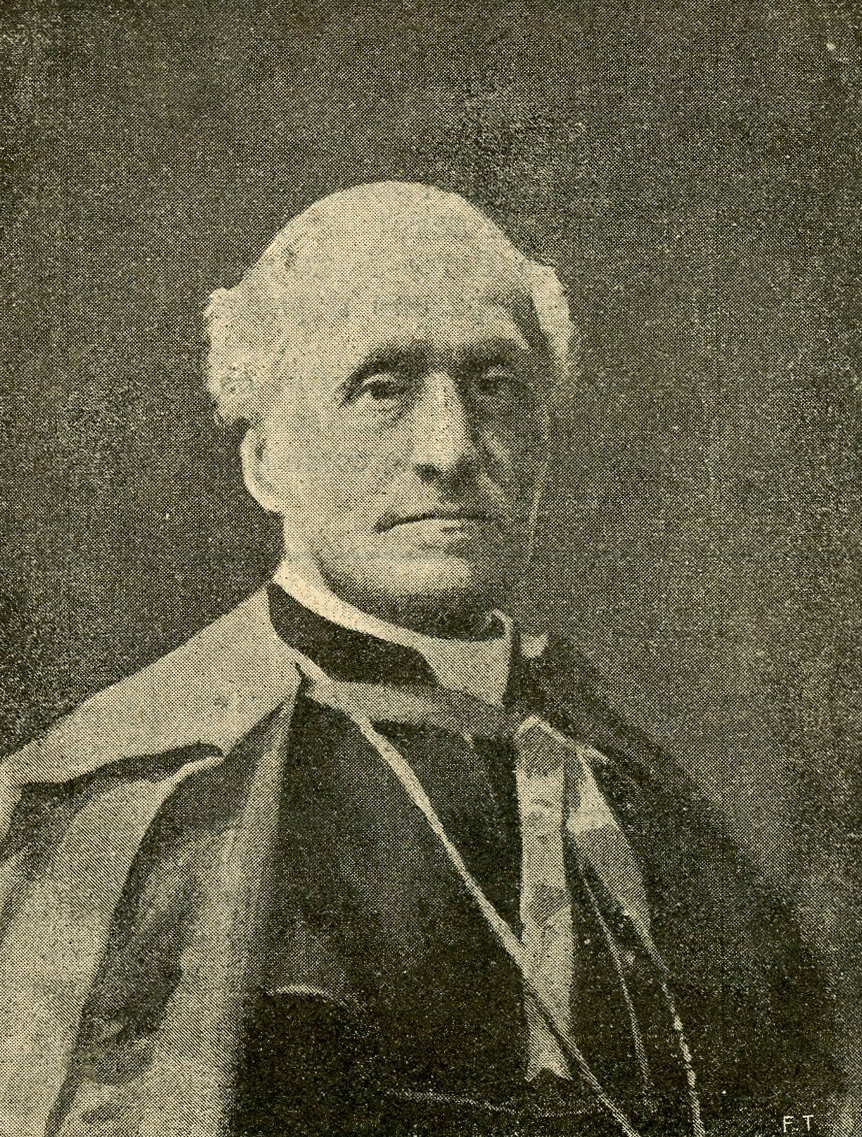
- Church: Roman Catholic Church
- Diocese: Verona
- See: Verona
- Appointed: 30 September 1861
- Term ended: 12 March 1900
- Predecessor: Benedetto Riccabona de Reinchenfels
- Successor: Bartolomeo Bacilieri
- Other post: Cardinal-Priest of San Marcello (1877–1900)

Orders
- Ordination: 1841
- Consecration: 23 January 1862 by Benedetto Riccabona de Reinchenfels
- Created cardinal: 12 March 1877 by Pope Pius IX
- Rank: Cardinal-Priest

Personal details
- Born: Luigi di Canossa; 20 April 1809 Verona, Napoleonic Kingdom
- Died: 12 March 1900 (aged 90) Verona, Kingdom of Italy
- Education: Collegio Romano
- Coat of arms: Luigi di Canossa's coat of arms

Styles of Luigi di Canossa
- Reference style: His Eminence
- Spoken style: Your Eminence
- Informal style: Cardinal
- See: Verona

Luigi di Canossa (20 April 1809 – 12 March 1900) was an Italian Cardinal of the Roman Catholic Church who served as Bishop of Verona from 1861 until his death, and was elevated to the cardinalate in 1877.

== Biography ==
Born in Verona, he was the son of marquess Bonifacio di Canossa (brother of Saint Maddalena di Canossa) and Francesca de' Castiglioni. In 1837 he entered in the Society of Jesus and was ordained priest in 1841. From 1847 he lived in Milan.

In January 1861, he was appointed Bishop of Verona by Pope Pius IX, who created him Cardinal-Priest of San Marcello in 1877.

== External links and additional sources ==
- Cheney, David M. "Diocese of Verona". Catholic-Hierarchy.org. (for Chronology of Bishops)^{self-published}
- Chow, Gabriel. "Diocese of Verona". GCatholic.org. (for Chronology of Bishops)^{self-published}
- Catholic-Hierarchy ^{[self-published]}
- Cardinals of the Holy Roman Church

Catholic Church titles
Preceded by Benedetto Riccabona	Bishop of Verona; 1861–1900	Succeeded by Bartolomeo Bacilieri
Records
Preceded by Teodolfo Mertel	Oldest living Member of the Sacred College; 11 July 1899 – 12 March 1900	Succeeded by Michelangelo Celesia
