= Maffeo Giovanni Ducoli =

Italian Roman Catholic bishop

- Bishop of the Diocese of Belluno-Feltre
- Church: Roman Catholic Church
- See: Diocese of Belluno-Feltre (Emeritus)
- In office: 1975—1996
- Predecessor: Gioacchino Muccin
- Successor: Pietro Brollo
- Previous post(s): Auxiliary bishop

Orders
- Ordination: May 30, 1942

Personal details
- Born: November 7, 1918; San Mauro di Saline, Italy
- Died: August 28, 2012 (aged 93)

Maffeo Giovanni Ducoli (November 7, 1918 – August 28, 2012) was an Italian Prelate of the Roman Catholic Church.

Ducoli was born in San Mauro di Saline, Italy and was ordained a priest of the Diocese of Verona on May 30, 1942. Ducoli was appointed Auxiliary bishop to the Diocese of Verona along with Titular Bishop of Fidenae on April 22, 1967, and ordained bishop on May 14, 1967. On October 7, 1975, he was appointed bishop of the Diocese of Belluno-Feltre from which he retired on February 2, 1996.
