= Giuseppe Carraro =

Bishop Giuseppe Carraro Venerable
- Bishop Emeritus of Verona
- Church: Roman Catholic Church
- Diocese: Verona
- See: Verona
- Appointed: 15 December 1958
- Installed: 18 January 1959
- Term ended: 18 May 1978
- Predecessor: Giovanni Urbani
- Successor: Giuseppe Amari
- Previous posts: Auxiliary Bishop of Treviso (1952–1956); Titular Bishop of Usula (1952–1956); Bishop of Vittorio Veneto (1956–1958)

Orders
- Ordination: 31 March 1923 by Giacinto Longhin
- Consecration: 1 November 1952 by Antonio Mantiero
- Rank: Bishop

Personal details
- Born: Giuseppe Carraro; 26 June 1899 Mira, Venice, Kingdom of Italy
- Died: 30 December 1980 (aged 81) Verona, Italy
- Motto: Vince in bono

Ordination history of Giuseppe Carraro
History
Priestly ordination
- Ordained by: Giacinto Longhin
Episcopal consecration
- Principal consecrator: Antonio Mantiero
- Co-consecrators: Girolamo Bortignon; Gioacchino Muccin
Episcopal succession
Bishops consecrated by Giuseppe Carraro as principal consecrator
- Giuseppe Lenotti: 23 October 1960
- Luigi Bellotti: 4 October 1964
- Maffeo Giovanni Ducoli: 14 May 1967
- Aldo Gobbi: 14 May 1967
- Sennen Corrà: 6 June 1976
- Lorenzo Bellomi: 27 November 1977

Giuseppe Carraro (26 June 1899 – 30 December 1980) was an Italian Roman Catholic prelate who served as the Bishop of Verona from 1958 until his retirement in 1978. He also served as the Bishop of Vittorio Veneto until his transferral to the see of Verona.

Carraro has been implicated in the sexual abuse scandal perpetrated against deaf-mute students of the Provolo Institute. There have been a string of allegations against the late Carraro himself that prompted the cause for his beatification to be suspended around 2010 pending the results of the investigation. The cause resumed in 2012 after an investigation cleared Carraro of all charges despite discrepancies remaining over the late bishop's actions.

He was considered a man of holiness and this allowed for his cause of beatification to be introduced in 2005 at which stage he was referred to as a Servant of God. He now has the posthumous title of a Venerable after Pope Francis confirmed Carraro's heroic virtue in 2015.

== Life ==
Giuseppe Carraro was born in Mira on 26 June 1899 to Sebastiano Carraro (7 July 1854 – 9 January 1956) and Clotilde Pizzati (19 September 1866 – 4 November 1948) and was baptized with the name Giovanni Giuseppe Moisè. His parents often called him "Beppino". His siblings were:

- Emilio (21 September 1898 – 5 January 1966)
- Margherita (1901–???)
- Attilio (1910–1974)
- Sergio (???–1958)
- Lisetta

In 1910 Father Eugenio Dorigon suggested to his parents that he commence his studies for the priesthood since Carraro had just finished school at that time. Despite the economic difficulties to ensure this he commenced his studies in Treviso in October 1910. The outbreak of World War I led to his conscription on 17 June 1917 and he remained there until 13 April 1920. On 31 March 1923 Bishop Giacinto Longhin ordained him into the priesthood. It had been from Longhin that he received his First Communion and Confirmation as well as the tonsure and all sacred orders prior to ordination. He continued his studies in Padua and received a degree in natural sciences. He also met Elia Dalla Costa - future cardinal and Venerable. From 1928 in Castelminio di Resana he taught various subjects that included humanities and mathematics. From 1938 he was named as the spiritual director to the seminarians.

He became rector in 1944 as the replacement of Vittorio Alessi and worked to ensure that seminarians grew from a cultural and spiritual perspective. Pope Pius XII later appointed Carraro as the Titular Bishop of Usula and the Auxiliary Bishop of Treviso. He received his episcopal consecration on 1 November 1952 from Bishop Antonio Mantiero. The co-consecrators included Girolamo Bortignon and Gioacchino Muccin.

Pius XII later named Carraro as the Bishop of Vittorio Veneto on 12 April 1956 and Carraro was enthroned in his new see on 9 June 1956. He took as his episcopal motto "Vince in bono". Pope John XXIII appointed him as the Bishop of Verona where he was installed in the beginning of 1959. He partook in all sessions of the Second Vatican Council and partook in the 1967 and 1974 Synods of Bishops at the behest of Pope Paul VI. He resigned from his position in mid-1978 prior to turning 75 as canon law dictated. Carraro ordained Mario Zenari - future cardinal - to the priesthood in 1970 and Giuseppe Zenti in 1971. He also served as a co-consecrator for the consecration of Giulio Bevilacqua. On 25 June 1978 he was present in the diocesan cathedral for the installation of his successor.

Carraro died on 30 December 1980 and was buried in the diocesan cathedral. He had spent his retirement on the hill of San Fidenzio. Cardinal Marco Cé - the Patriarch of Venice - celebrated his funeral and said: "We have lost a brother; full of spiritual wisdom and pastoral experience but we have been given an intercessor in heaven".

== Beatification process ==
The introduction of the cause for sainthood took place on a local level on 30 December 2005 even though the Congregation for the Causes of Saints didn't approve the cause to begin until 5 June 2006 (the C.C.S. granted the "nihil obstat" for the cause's formal introduction). The process closed on 18 October 2008 and the C.C.S. validated the process on 26 February 2010. The Positio - documentation on his life of heroic virtue - was submitted to Rome in 2012 for assessment.

He was declared to be venerable on 16 July 2015 after Pope Francis had confirmed that he lived a life of heroic virtue.

== Sexual abuse allegations ==
Carraro has been implicated in sexual abuse allegations made when it was revealed that there was widespread abuse of deaf-mute children from the Provolo Institute. Gianni Bisoli (b. 1949) accused Carraro of having molested him on five occasions while he was at the institute from ages nine to fifteen. Bisoli accused Carraro of having once attempted to sodomize him with a banana. But a diocesan probe cleared Carraro of all allegations despite never having interviewed alleged victims and limiting testimonies to a select few people.

Bishop Giuseppe Zenti - the Bishop of Verona - accused those former students of fabricating their claims to a left-leaning paper while referring to the accusations as nothing more than "lies" and a cheap stunt.

== See also ==
- Catholic Church in Italy
- List of venerated Christians
- Diocese of Verona
