= Marco Antonio Mocenigo =

Catholic prelate

Most Reverend Marco Antonio Mocenigo
- Bishop of Ceneda
- Church: Catholic Church
- Diocese: Diocese of Ceneda
- In office: 1586–1598
- Predecessor: Michele della Torre
- Successor: Leonardo Mocenigo

Orders
- Consecration: 12 March 1586 by Decio Azzolini (seniore)

Marco Antonio Mocenigo was a Roman Catholic prelate who served as Bishop of Ceneda (1586–1598).

== Biography ==
On 5 March 1586, he was appointed during the papacy of Pope Sixtus V as Bishop of Ceneda. On 12 March 1586, he was consecrated bishop by Decio Azzolini (seniore), Bishop of Cervia, with Pietro Lunello, Bishop of Gaeta, and Giovanni Battista Santorio, Bishop of Tricarico, serving as co-consecrators. He served as Bishop of Ceneda until his resignation in 1598 or 1599.

== External links and additional sources ==
- Cheney, David M. "Diocese of Vittorio Veneto (Ceneda)". Catholic-Hierarchy.org. (for Chronology of Bishops) ^{[self-published]}
- Chow, Gabriel. "Diocese of Vittorio Veneto (Ceneda)(Italy)". GCatholic.org. (for Chronology of Bishops) ^{[self-published]}

Catholic Church titles
Preceded by Michele della Torre	Bishop of Ceneda; 1586–1598	Succeeded by Leonardo Mocenigo
