= Placido Maria Schiaffino =

His Eminence Placido Maria Schiaffino O.S.B. Oliv.
- Prefect of the Congregation of the Index
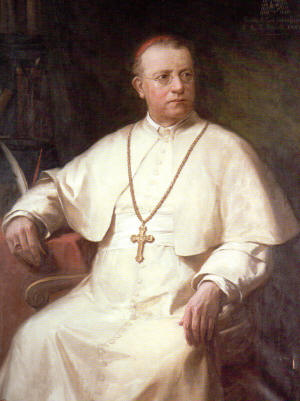
- Church: Roman Catholic Church
- Appointed: 6 April 1888
- Term ended: 23 September 1889
- Predecessor: Tommaso Maria Martinelli
- Successor: Camillo Mazzella
- Other posts: Cardinal-Priest of Santi Giovanni e Paolo (1885-89); Librarian of the Vatican Apostolic Library (1888-89)
- Previous posts: Titular Bishop of Nyssa (1878-85); President of the Pontifical Ecclesiastical Academy (1878-84); Secretary of the Congregation of Bishops and Regulars (1884-88)

Orders
- Ordination: 1852
- Consecration: 1 September 1878 by Raffaele Monaco La Valletta
- Created cardinal: 27 July 1885 by Pope Leo XIII
- Rank: Cardinal-Priest

Personal details
- Born: Placido Maria Schiaffino; 8 September 1829 Genoa, Kingdom of Sardinia
- Died: 23 September 1889 (aged 60) Subiaco, Kingdom of Italy
- Buried: Santa Maria Nuova (since 1936)
- Education: Roman College

Placido Maria Schiaffino, O.S.B. Oliv. (8 September 1829 – 23 September 1889) was an Italian prelate of the Catholic Church who held senior positions in the Benedictine order and in the Roman Curia. He was made a cardinal in 1885.

== Biography ==
Placido Maria Schiaffino was born to a family of modest means in Genoa on 5 September 1829. He studied there and entered the Order of Saint Benedict Olivetana at the monastery of San Girolamo di Quarto a Mare near Genoa in 1846, taking his vows on 17 October 1847. He studied philosophy at Collegio Romano in 1847, but political turmoil interrupted his education and he became master of novices in the Olivetan monastery of Sicily the next year. He took up his studies in Rome again in 1850, was ordained a priest in 1852, and earned his doctorate in theology in 1854.

Based in the convent of Monte Oliveto Maggiore in Siena, he was a preacher for several years and became chancellor of his congregation on 15 May 1859 and abbot ordinary and vicar general of his congregation on 3 June 1870, and in that role participated in the First Vatican Council.

Pope Leo XIII, who while bishop of Perugia had heard Schiaffino preach in 1868, appointed him titular bishop of Nissa on 30 August 1878. He received his episcopal consecration on 1 September 1878 from Cardinal Raffaele Monaco La Valletta, vicar general of Rome and was named president of the Pontifical Academy of Ecclesiastical Noble on 2 November 1878. Pope Leo made him secretary of the Congregation of Bishops and Regulars on 18 November 1884.

Pope Leo raised him to the rank of cardinal on 27 July 1885 and assigned him as a cardinal priest the title of Santi Giovanni e Paolo on 30 July.

He was named prefect of the Congregation of the Index on 6 April 1888, where he served until he was appointed Vatican Librarian on 20 February 1889. Beginning 18 May 1889, he was also the administrator of the Benedictine abbey in Subiaco.

He died in the abbey of Subiaco on 23 September 1889 at the age of 60.
