= Giovanni Francesco Barbarigo =

Italian cardinal

- Bishop of Padua
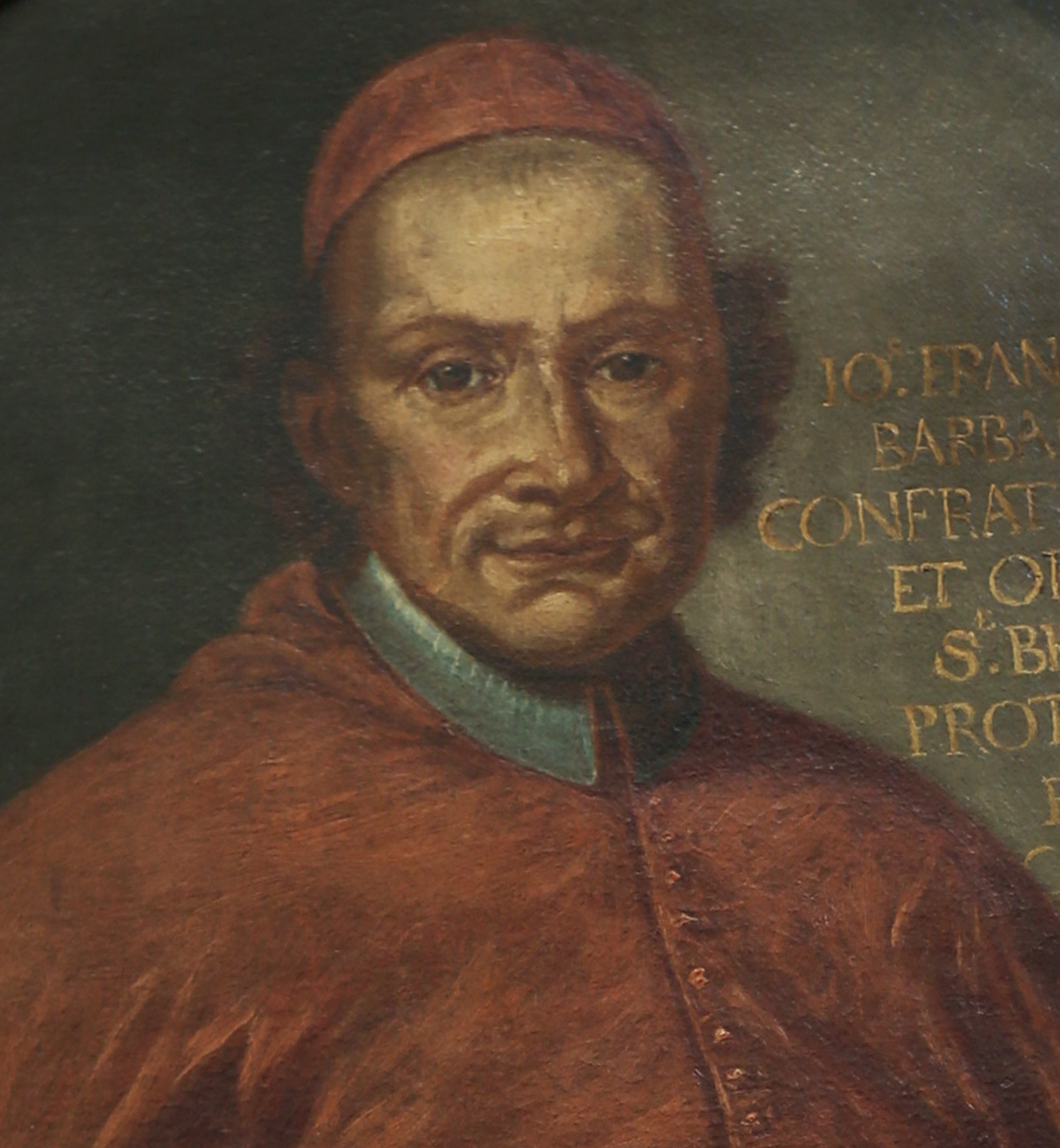
- Native name: Gianfrancesco Barbarigo
- Church: Catholic Church
- Diocese: Diocese of Padua
- In office: 20 January 1723 – 26 January 1730
- Predecessor: Giorgio Cornaro
- Successor: Giovanni Minotto Ottoboni
- Other post: Cardinal-Priest of Santi Marcellino e Pietro (1721-1730)
- Previous posts: Bishop of Brescia (1714-1723); Bishop of Verona (1698-1714)

Orders
- Consecration: 17 August 1698 by Sebastiano Antonio Tanara
- Created cardinal: 1719/1720 by Pope Clement XI

Personal details
- Born: 29 April 1658 Venice, Republic of Venice
- Died: 26 January 1730 (aged 71)

Giovanni Francesco Barbarigo (29 April 1658 at Venice – 26 January 1730) was an Italian cardinal and nephew of Saint Gregorio Barbarigo (1625–97).

== Biography ==
Born to a patrician family of Venice on 29 April 1658, Giovanni Francesco Barbarigo was the nephew of Cardinal Gregorio Barbarigo. Giovanni Francesco first entered the diplomatic service and was twice sent as representative of the Venetian Republic to the court of King Louis XIV of France. However, he soon turned to an ecclesiastical career, where, if not the great ardor of his vocation, at least illustrious family traditions called him.

In 1674, he became Primicerius of the Church of St. Mark at Venice, and the same year, was named Bishop of Verona by Pope Innocent XII. Faced with the difficulties and practical problems of his daily apostolic work, he always returned to the great model that could not help but occupy his mind, that of his great uncle Gregory Barbarigo, who in turn, had taken Charles Borromeo as his model. Thus, in his religious action and in his ecclesiastical activity, the methods and themes that dominated the Venetian Church in its counter-reformation action are seen again. He greatly increased the number of clerics; paying particular attention to the seminaries of the diocese. Barbarigo also assisted Saint Rose Venerini to found ten schools for poor young women and girls in Montefiascone and the villages surrounding Lake Bolsena between 1692 and 1694; other schools were also founded in Lazio. Barbarigo did the fundraising and Venerini publicized the schools to families, trained the teachers, and organized the schools.

Devoted to prayer, preaching, personal witness of faith, as practical ideals of action of the Counter-Reformation, he was able to translate and apply with commitment and dedication to his episcopal see. He personally visited hospitals and provided relief in the most diverse situations, such as during an epidemic that struck his diocese in 1702. He provided for the rest of the territories entrusted many missions, which he assigned entirely to the fathers of the Society of Jesus. On every occasion he became a strong supporter of the rights and prerogatives of the Church with regard to power and civil order, defending ecclesiastical immunities with particular attention.

He was transferred to Brescia in 1714, created cardinal in 1720, and in 1723 became a successor of his uncle in the See of Padua. He was zealous in promoting the cause of beatification of his uncle, and lent his patronage to the production of literary works. For example, he commissioned the Jesuit scholar Giovanni Saverio Valcavi (1701-1781) with publishing the elegy of his family: Nuraismata vivorum illustrium ex Barabadica Gente in 1732 in Pavia. To his suggestion was due the inception of the ecclesiastical history of Verona, and the works of St. Zeno, Bishop of Verona (362-380), were reprinted at his expense in Padua, in 1710.

Giovanni Francesco Barbarigo died in 1730.

== External links and additional sources ==
- Cheney, David M. "Diocese of Padova {Padua}". Catholic-Hierarchy.org. (for Chronology of Bishops) ^{[self-published]}
- Chow, Gabriel. "Diocese of Padova (Italy)". GCatholic.org. (for Chronology of Bishops) ^{[self-published]}

Catholic Church titles
| Preceded by Pietro Leoni (bishop) | Bishop of Verona; 1698–1714 | Succeeded by Marco Gradenigo |
| Preceded by Gianalberto Badoer | Bishop of Brescia; 1714–1723 | Succeeded by Fortunato Morosini |
| Preceded by Francesco Pignatelli | Cardinal-Priest of Santi Marcellino e Pietro; 1721–1730 | Succeeded by Sigismund Kollonitsch |
| Preceded by Giorgio Cornaro (cardinal) | Bishop of Padua; 1723–1730 | Succeeded by Giovanni Minotto Ottoboni |
