= Guido Memo =

Bishop of Verona

Most Reverend Guido Memo
- Bishop of Verona
- Church: Catholic Church
- Diocese: Diocese of Verona
- In office: 1409–1438
- Predecessor: Angelo Barbarigo
- Successor: Francesco Condulmer

Personal details
- Died: 1438 Verona, Italy

Guido Memo (died 1438) was a Roman Catholic prelate who served as Bishop of Verona (1409–1438).

== Biography ==
On 29 November 1409, Guido Memo was appointed during the papacy of Pope Gregory XII as Bishop of Verona. He served as Bishop of Verona until his death in 1438.

== External links and additional sources ==
- Cheney, David M. "Diocese of Verona". Catholic-Hierarchy.org. (for Chronology of Bishops) ^{[self-published]}
- Chow, Gabriel. "Diocese of Verona". GCatholic.org. (for Chronology of Bishops) ^{[self-published]}

Catholic Church titles
Preceded by Angelo Barbarigo	Bishop of Verona; 1409–1438	Succeeded by Francesco Condulmer
