= Sebastiano Pisani (iuniore) =

Italian Catholic prelate (1630–1690)

Most Reverend Sebastiano Pisani
- Bishop of Verona
- Church: Catholic Church
- Diocese: Diocese of Verona
- In office: 1668–1690
- Predecessor: Sebastiano Pisani (seniore)
- Successor: Pietro Leoni (bishop)

Orders
- Ordination: 22 September 1668
- Consecration: 16 December 1668 by Pietro Vito Ottoboni

Personal details
- Born: 16 October 1630 Venice, Italy
- Died: 5 August 1690 (age 59) Verona, Italy

Sebastiano Pisani (16 October 1630 – 5 August 1690) was a Roman Catholic prelate who was Bishop of Verona (1668–1690).

== Biography ==
Pisani was born in Venice, Italy on 16 October 1630 and ordained a priest on 22 September 1668. On 10 December 1668, he was appointed during the papacy of Pope Clement IX as Bishop of Verona. On 16 December 1668, he was consecrated bishop by Pietro Vito Ottoboni, Cardinal-Priest of San Marco, with Giacomo Altoviti, Titular Patriarch of Antioch, and Stefano Brancaccio, Titular Archbishop of Hadrianopolis in Haemimonto, as co-consecrators. He was Bishop of Verona until his death on 5 August 1690.

While bishop, he was the principal consecrator of Francesco Alberti di Poja, Bishop of Trento (1678).

== External links and additional sources ==
- Cheney, David M. "Diocese of Verona". Catholic-Hierarchy.org. (for Chronology of Bishops) ^{[self-published]}
- Chow, Gabriel. "Diocese of Verona". GCatholic.org. (for Chronology of Bishops) ^{[self-published]}

Catholic Church titles
Preceded by Sebastiano Pisani (seniore)	Bishop of Verona; 1668–1690	Succeeded by Pietro Leoni (bishop)
