= Ricciardi =

Ricciardi is an Italian surname. Notable people with the surname include:

- Antonio Ricardo (1532–1605/1606), Italian printer working in South America
- Armando Ricciardi (born 1905, death unknown), Italian boxer
- J. P. Ricciardi (born 1959), American baseball executive
- Giovanni Ricciardi (born 1968), Italian cellist
- Laura Ricciardi, American film-maker
- Marlene Ricciardi (born 1992), Italian female canoeist
- Michele Ricciardi (1672–1753), Italian painter
- Mirella Ricciardi (born 1931), Kenyan-born photographer and author
- Richard Ricciardi, American nursing academic
- Romano Ricciardi (born 1986), Italian/Swiss jazz saxophonist
- Sabrina Ricciardi (born 1968), Italian politician
- Sara Ricciardi (born 1996), Italian gymnast
- Tony Ricciardi (born 1983), American computer businessman
- Victor Ricciardi, American professor of business and author
