= Sebastiano Pisani (seniore) =

Roman Catholic prelate

Most Reverend Sebastiano Pisani
- Titular Archbishop of Thessalonica
- Church: Catholic Church
- In office: 1669–1670
- Predecessor: Lucas Bueno
- Successor: Francesco Buonvisi
- Previous posts: Bishop of Ceneda (1639–1653); Bishop of Verona (1653–1668)

Orders
- Ordination: 1639
- Consecration: 27 December 1639 by Guido Bentivoglio d'Aragona

Personal details
- Born: 1606 Venice, Italy
- Died: 1670 (age 64)

Sebastiano Pisani (1606–1670) was a Roman Catholic prelate who served as Titular Archbishop of Thessalonica (1669–1670), Bishop of Verona (1653–1668) and Bishop of Ceneda (1639–1653).

== Biography ==
Sebastiano Pisani was born in Venice, Italy in 1606 and ordained a priest in 1639. On 19 December 1639, he was appointed Bishop of Ceneda by Pope Urban VIII. On 27 December 1639, he was consecrated bishop by Guido Bentivoglio d'Aragona, Cardinal-Priest of Santa Maria in Trastevere, with Giovanni Battista Altieri, Bishop Emeritus of Camerino, and Marcantonio Bragadin, Bishop of Vicenza, serving as co-consecrators.

On 6 October 1653, he was appointed Bishop of Verona by Pope Innocent X. He served as Bishop of Verona until his resignation on 9 December 1668. On 14 January 1669, he was appointed Titular Archbishop of Thessalonica by Pope Clement IX.

He died in 1670.

== Episcopal succession ==
While bishop, he was the principal co-consecrator of:

- Giovanni Quirino, Archbishop of Candia (1645); and
- Giovanni Camponeschi, Bishop of Termia (1645).

== External links and additional sources ==
- Cheney, David M. "Diocese of Vittorio Veneto (Ceneda)". Catholic-Hierarchy.org. (for Chronology of Bishops) ^{[self-published]}
- Chow, Gabriel. "Diocese of Vittorio Veneto (Ceneda)(Italy)". GCatholic.org. (for Chronology of Bishops) ^{[self-published]}
- Cheney, David M. "Diocese of Verona". Catholic-Hierarchy.org. (for Chronology of Bishops) ^{[self-published]}
- Chow, Gabriel. "Diocese of Verona". GCatholic.org. (for Chronology of Bishops) ^{[self-published]}
- Cheney, David M. "Thessalonica (Titular See)". Catholic-Hierarchy.org. (for Chronology of Bishops (for Chronology of Bishops) ^{[self-published]}
- Chow, Gabriel. "Titular Metropolitan See of Thessalonica (Greece)". GCatholic.org. (for Chronology of Bishops (for Chronology of Bishops) ^{[self-published]}

Catholic Church titles
Preceded by Marcantonio Bragadin	Bishop of Ceneda; 1639–1653	Succeeded by Albertino Barisoni
Preceded by Marco Giustiniani	Bishop of Verona; 1653–1668	Succeeded by Sebastiano Pisani (iuniore)
Preceded by Lucas Bueno	Titular Archbishop of Thessalonica; 1669–1670	Succeeded by Francesco Buonvisi
