= Albertino Barisoni =

Roman Catholic Bishop

- Bishop of Ceneda
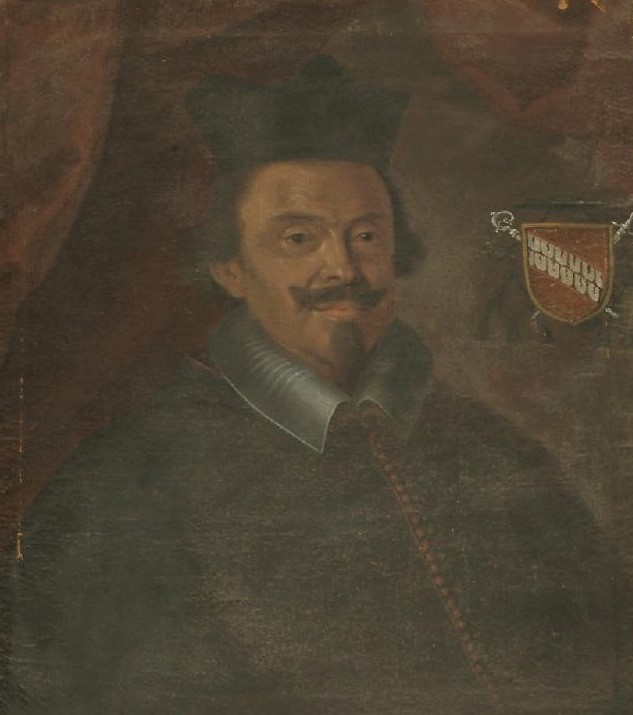
- Church: Catholic Church
- Diocese: Diocese of Ceneda
- Appointed: 23 November 1653
- Term ended: 14 August 1667
- Predecessor: Sebastiano Pisani (seniore)
- Successor: Pietro Leoni (bishop)

Orders
- Consecration: 27 December 1653 (Bishop)

Personal details
- Born: 7 September 1587 Padua, Venetian Republic
- Died: 14 August 1667 (aged 79) Ceneda, Venetian Republic

Albertino Barisoni (1587 – 1667) was an Italian writer and poet, and Bishop of Ceneda from 1653 to his death.

== Biography ==
Albertino Barisoni was born in Padua, on 7 September 1587. His noble family was native to Vigonza, a village next to Padua.

Barisoni began his humanistic education at Padua and, after manifesting a talent and inclination for ecclesiastic life, was sent to Rome to pursue the study of philosophy. In Rome, he became a member of the clergy. He returned to Padua in 1610 as a Canon of the cathedral and there continued his studies. He graduated in philosophy on 8 February 1605, at the age of seventeen. Afterward, he continued his education by studying law.

In 1614, Barisoni went to Rome in the company of Paolo Gualdo to solve some curial questions and afterward (at an indeterminable date) was appointed to an abbacy in Germany. However, he returned to Rome because he found the climate uncongenial. Having resigned his position as a canon when named an abbot, upon his return to Padua, he retired to his family estate at Vigonza and devoted himself to study.

On 23 November 1653, Barisoni was appointed during the papacy of Pope Innocent X as Bishop of Ceneda. He performed an pastoral visit in 1665 and founded a monastery in Rua di Feletto. He served as Bishop of Ceneda until his death on 14 August 1667.

== Works ==
During his stay in Rome, Barisoni wrote poetry. He was one of the most illustrious members of the Accademia Galileiana, under the pseudonym “Stentato”. On March 1619 he became “principe” of the Accademia. He was also a member of the Venetian Accademia degli Incogniti. In 1622, he edited and published, with a commentary, the work of his friend, the poet Alessandro Tassoni, entitled La secchia rapita.

He is remembered as one of the first theorists of the archival studies, due to his Commentarius de archivis antiquorum (published posthumous in 1737).

The main titles that he published are:

- Degli antiventagli d'Ermidoro Filalete. Fascio primo (Venice, 1625)
- Encomio della poesia nella rinovazione dell'Academia de' Ricovrati di Padova dello Stentato allora prencipe d'essa Academia (Padua, 1619)
