= Giuseppe Zenti =

Italian Catholic bishop

- Bishop Emeritus of Verona
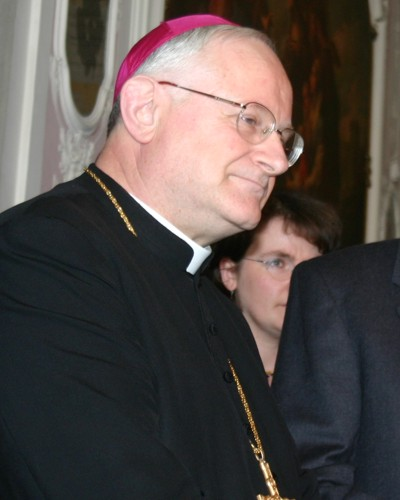
- Church: Catholic Church
- Diocese: Diocese of Verona
- In office: 8 May 2007 – 2 July 2022
- Predecessor: Flavio Roberto Carraro
- Successor: Domenico Pompili
- Previous post: Bishop of Vittorio Veneto (2003-2007)

Orders
- Ordination: 26 June 1971 by Giuseppe Carraro
- Consecration: 11 January 2004 by Flavio Roberto Carraro

Personal details
- Born: 7 March 1947 (age 79) San Martino Buon Albergo, Province of Verona, Italy

Giuseppe Zenti (born 7 March 1947) is an Italian prelate of the Catholic Church. He was the Bishop of Verona from 2007 until July 2022, having turned 75 years old, the age limit for catholic bishops.

Zenti was born in San Martino Buon Albergo in the province of Verona on 7 March 1947. He studied for the priesthood at the seminary of Verona and was ordained on 26 June 1971.

He continued his studies at the University of Padua and in 1975 received his degree in classical literature.

From 1974 to 1993 he taught at the minor seminary of San Massimo, becoming its vice rector 1989 and then pro-rector.

From 1993 to 1997 he was a parish pastor, first in Santa Maria Immacolata in Borgo Milano and then in Legnago. On 25 January 2002, he was named Vicar General of the Diocese.

Pope John Paul II named him Bishop of Vittorio Veneto on 3 December 2003. He received his episcopal consecration on 11 January 2004.

Pope Benedict XVI named him Bishop of Verona on 8 May 2007, and he was installed there on 30 June.
