= Diocese of Verona =

Roman Catholic diocese in Italy

Diocese of Verona Dioecesis Veronensis

Catholic
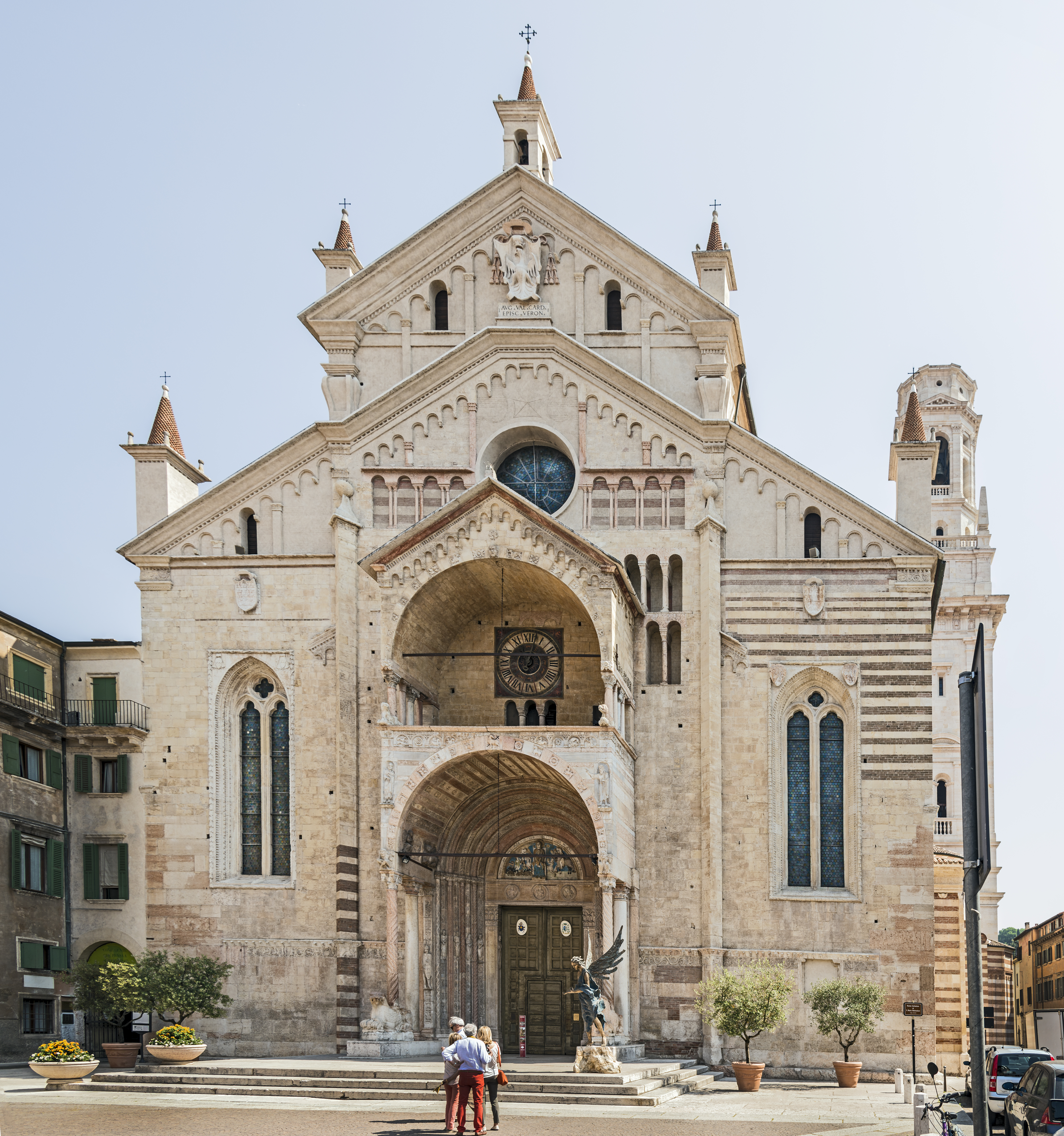
- Verona Cathedral

Location
- Country: Italy
- Ecclesiastical province: Venice

Statistics
- Area: 3,050 km^{2} (1,180 sq mi)
- Population: Total; Catholics: (as of 2023); 955,303 ▲; 845,453 ▼ (88.5 ▼%)
- Parishes: 378< ▼!-- Number of parishes in the diocese -->

Information
- Denomination: Catholic
- Sui iuris church: Latin Church
- Rite: Roman Rite
- Established: 3rd century
- Cathedral: Cattedrale di S. Maria Assunta
- Secular priests: 587 (diocesan) ▼319 (Religious Orders) ▼54 Permanent Deacons ▲

Current leadership
- Pope: Leo XIV
- Bishop: Domenico Pompili
- Bishops emeritus: Giuseppe Zenti

Map

Website
- diocesiverona.it

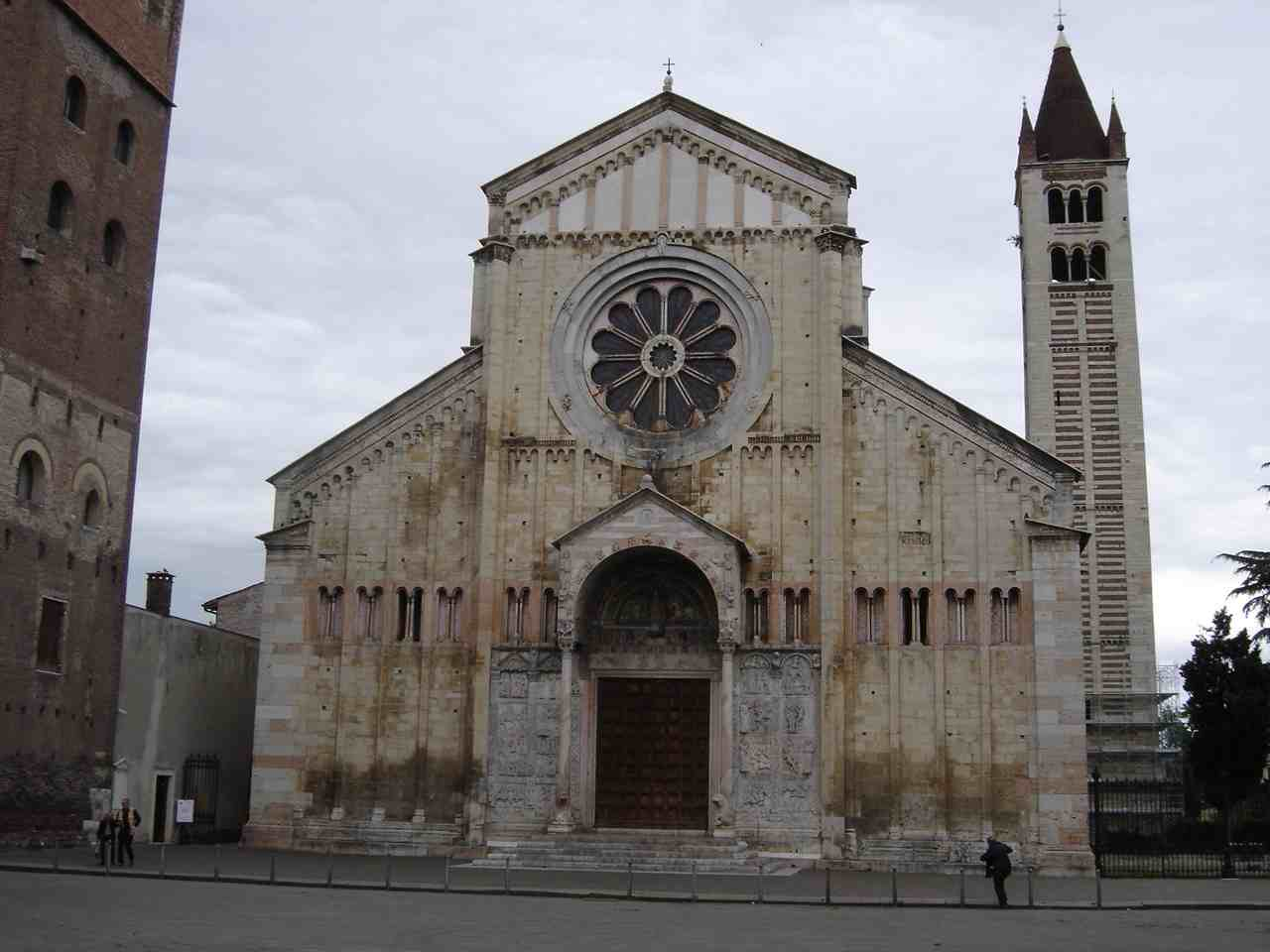
The Basilica di San Zeno.

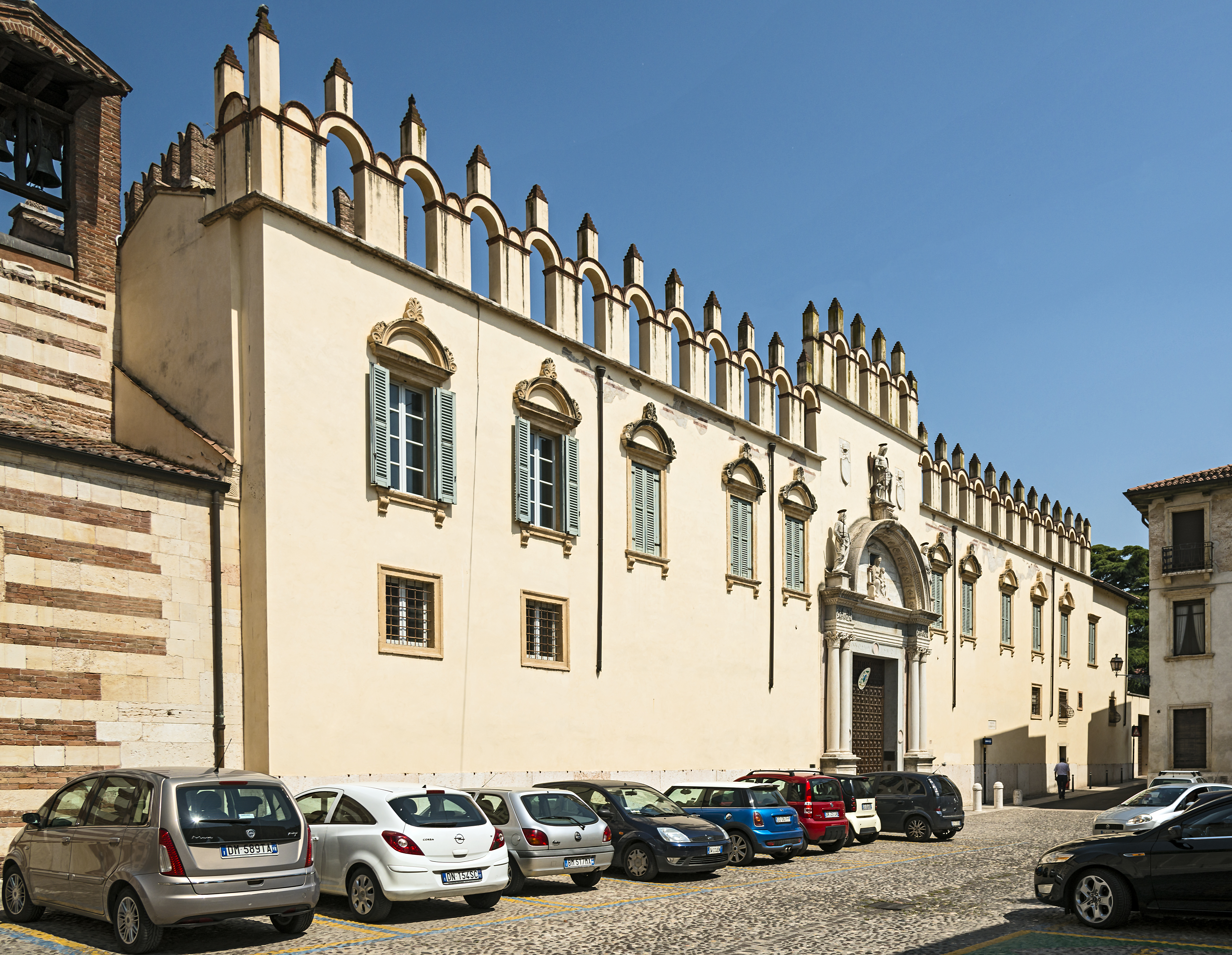
The facade of Palazzo del Vescovado

The Diocese of Verona (Latin: Dioecesis Veronensis) is a Latin diocese of the Catholic Church in northern Italy. The diocese belongs to the Episcopal Conference of Italy, in the Ecclesiastical Province of Venice. The bishop of Verona has his seat in Verona, Veneto. The episcopal throne is in the cathedral, which had originally been dedicated to S. Maria Matricolare and S. George.

== History ==
=== Sources? ===
The Carmen Pipinianum (Pippin's Song) is a 9th-century heroic poem, which includes a description of Verona and its churches, and gives a list of the first eight bishops: St. Euprepius, Dimidrianus (Demetrianus), Simplicius, Proculus, Saturninus, Lucilius (Lucillus, Lucius), Gricinus, and Saint Zeno.

Less important are the three fragments of the so-called Velo di Classe, now believed to be the altar cover from San Firmo e Rustico in Verona, the pianeta (chasuble) of Classe in Ravenna, on which are represented not only the bishops of Verona, but also other saints and bishops of other dioceses venerated at Verona in the ninth century. These liturgical textiles, are not, of course, historical documents, but devotional aids.

=== Early bishops ===
It was once believed that S. Euprepius was a disciple of S. Peter the Apostle, a fact inscribed on the façade of the Church of S. Proculo in Verona. The sixth bishop, Lucilius, attended the Council of Sardica in 347, which indicates that there is a problem with the list of bishops, with the dates, or with both. Since S. Zeno had been the eighth bishop, the episcopacy of Euprepius, and therefore of the erection of the see, must be placed not in the mid-third century, before the temporary peace given to the Church under Emperor Gallienus (260), but rather a generation later, under the first period of the reign of Diocletian, when the Church enjoyed peace. In the same "Carmen", mention is made of St. Firmus and St. Rusticus, martyred at Verona, probably under Maximian. Other evidence indicates that Firmus was killed at Carthage, c. 251–253, and that Rusticus was killed at Lambaesis (Africa) c. 259.

Zeno is called a martyr in the "Carmen" and is placed in the time of Gallienus (c. 260). At any rate the existence of a distinguished S. Zeno, Bishop of Verona, a contemporary of St. Ambrose of Milan (c. 340–397), and author of a series of religious discourses, is historically attested, so as the ancient documents know but one bishop of that name, it must be concluded that, as early as the ninth century, the legend had corrupted chronology.

For the rest, we know from the sermons of Saint Zeno of Verona how deeply paganism was still rooted in Verona in his time, particularly in the country districts.

In the second half of the 6th century, other bishops, Solatius and Junior, following the other bishops of the province of Ravenna, joined the schism of the Three Chapters.

Bishop Rotaldus imposed community life on the cathedral Canons (806) and reorganised the education of the clergy. In 813, however, he surrendered control of the Canons of the cathedral of Verona to the jurisdiction of the Patriarch of Aquileia. Among the masters of his school, the Archdeacon Pacificus (c. 776–c. 844) was known for his knowledge of the Greek language and Hebrew language, although the Italian historian Cristina La Rocca demonstrates this claim to be a twelfth century fabrication. Pacificus apparently supported the revolt of Bernardus, son of Pippin, against the Emperor Louis the Pious in 817, and was confined to the monastery of Nonantola for the rest of his life.

Nottingus (840) was the first Italian bishop to denounce the heretic Godescalcus de Orbais.

In 876, Bishop Adelardus (c. 875–911) found himself in trouble with the pope. On 2 November, he was summoned to appear before a papal synod to answer charges of oppressing the monastery of Nonantula by 30 November, or if that proved impossible, by 25 December. By another letter Pope John VIII reminded Adelardus that he had warned him several times through missi and bishops not to harass the monastery. Then, in accordance with a decision of the synod, he ordered Adelardus not to employ the property of Nonantula for his own purposes. Finally, on 17 April 877, Pope John announced to the Emperor Charles the Bald that he had excommunicated Adelardus. Pope John then wrote to the clergy of Verona that he had excommunicated Adelardus until he should come to the Papal Court and give adequate explanations for his conduct. He was restored to the papal good graces quickly, and was in attendance at Pope John VIII's council of Ravenna in November 877.

Ratherius (932–968), a Benedictine and a distinguished author, was thrice driven from his see, in 952, 955, and 968, by usurpers, among whom was Manasses of Arles. After the third expulsion, he resigned and took refuge in the monastery of Lobbia, where he died in 974. He also fostered learning in the cathedral school. Joannes (1027) was distinguished for sanctity and learning. Bishop Bruno (1073), who wrote some interpretations of Scripture, was killed by one of his chaplains.

=== Barbarossa, the popes, and Verona ===
In the time of Bishop Ognibene (1157–1185), a distinguished canonist, Pope Lucius III visited Verona. During his stay, and the stay of his successor, the episcopal palace was used as the papal residence, and the bishop of Verona had to find quarters at the church of S. Giorgio. Pope Lucius had been driven out of Rome by his own Romans, because he had opposed the Romans in their war against Tusculum. He was searching for heretics in the north, by which he meant those who denied the temporal or spiritual sovereignty of the pope, and was eager for a meeting with the Emperor Frederick I Barbarossa. The pope arrived in Verona on 22 July 1184, but Frederick was detained in Germany by festivities surrounding the coronation of his son Henry as king. They finally met in late October, and held a series of acrimonious meetings. Finally they held a synod in Verona on 4 November 1184, denouncing various heresies, including the Paterini, the Cathari, the Humiliati of Lyon, the Passagini, the Josephini, and the Arnaldisti (by which he meant the Romans who rejected papal temporal power), and ordering their uprooting. Lucius III issued the papal bull Ad Abolendam on the same day. Pope Lucius died, still in residence in Verona, on 25 November 1185, and was buried in the cathedral.

The cardinals met immediately after the burial of Lucius III, and unanimously selected as his successor Cardinal Umberto Crivelli, the Archbishop of Milan, "a violent and unyielding spirit, and a strong opponent of Frederick." He chose the name Urban III, and he spent nearly all of his brief pontificate with the Papal Court at Verona, besieged by Frederick with unbelievable fury. Anyone heading for Verona to appeal to the pope was subject to imprisonment, torture, and execution. Urban finally escaped from Verona at the end of September 1187, but died at Ferrara on 20 October 1187.

=== Frederick II, Ezzelino da Romano, and Verona ===
In 1229, the cities of the Marches, as well as Verona, revolted against the authority of Pope Gregory IX in favor of the Emperor Frederick II. The result was an intensified struggle between the Ghibellines (supporters of the Empire) and the Guelphs (supporters of the Papacy). In 1232, Frederick visited Verona, and, seeing that some cities of the Marche of Vicentino were collaborating with the Lombard League, the Ezzolino family entered into a firm alliance with Frederick, and obtained control over most of the lower Po valley. When Frederick died in 1250, Ezzolino became the leader of the entire Ghibelline party in the Po valley. Bishops Jacopo da Breganza (1225–1254) and Gerardo Cossadocca (1255–1259), who stood with the Papacy, were exiled by the Imperial Vicar, Ezzelino III da Romano. In February 1258, Ezzolino rounded up and executed a dozen and more citizens and nobles of Verona, who had been conspiring against him. In the summer, Archbishop Philip of Ravenna, who was also papal Legate, and bishop-elect Cossadoca, organized an expedition of Brescians, Modenese, and Veronese exiles, against Ezzolino's force of 300 soldiers, which was in Cremona; they expected to keep it from returning to Verona. Ezzolino met them at Torcella and soundly defeated them. The archbishop and the bishop-elect were among those captured and imprisoned, on 28 August 1258. The next day Ezzolino entered Brescia. During military operations in September 1259, however, Ezzolino was wounded, captured, and imprisoned, where he died on 27 September 1259. In September 1260, Mastino della Scala (Scaliger) was elected Podestà of Verona, but when he was not reelected, he had himself elected Captain of the People in 1262, and from that point, following the example of Ezzolino, he was Lord of Verona.

Bishop-elect Cossadoca died shortly thereafter. His successor, Manfred Roberti, a Canon of Padua, was appointed by Pope Alexander IV on 15 January 1260. He fell into the hands of the Ghibellines in 1264, and was imprisoned for two years, only being liberated because of the intervention of Pope Clement IV and the King of Aragon. He died in Reggo Emilia on 5 December 1268, less than a week after Pope Clement himself. Clement's death brought on the longest papal vacancy in history, two years and nine months, during which Verona suffered a schism between two would-be bishops.

Bishop Bartolommeo della Scala (1336–1338), a Benedictine who had been Abbot of S. Zeno, was the victim of malicious reports by Azzo da Corregio to the bishop's own nephew Mastino, Lord of Verona, which induced Mastino, who saw treason, to slay the bishop with his own hand on 27 August 1338. The news was immediately brought to Avignon to Pope Benedict XII, who promptly excommunicated Mastino and all the people of Verona. The people begged Mastino to seek forgiveness from the pope, and, upon receiving a report from Patriarch Bertrandus of Aquileia, Pope Benedict relented. However, severe penances were imposed by the pope, as he detailed in a letter of 25 September 1338 to Bishop Gottifredus of Mantua, who was charged with seeing that the penances were carried out. These began with a humiliating procession of the bareheaded Mastino to the cathedral, hearing Mass, and then solemnly begging the Canons to pardon his outrage. He was also required to endow six chaplaincies in the cathedral, for priests to say daily masses for the dead bishop. Each year, on the anniversary of the murder, he was to give new clothes to twenty-four poor persons. On every Friday of the year, and on the vigil of every festival of the Virgin Mary, he was to feed two poor people. At the next levy of soldiers for the crusade, he was to provide and supply twenty-four armed men. As far as the city of Verona was concerned, Pope Benedict XII removed permanently the right of the Canons and clergy to elect the bishop, a right they had enjoyed for two and a half centuries, reserving that right to the Holy See.

Pietro della Scala reformed the lives of the clergy and tried unsuccessfully to bring the Canons under his own jurisdiction instead of that of the Patriarch of Aquileia; it was not until the death of the last Patriarch of Aquileia that the Bishop of Verona acquired rights over his own Canons. When the Visconti dynasty obtained possession of Verona, Pietro was banished. Francesco Condulmer (1439–1453), the nephew of Pope Eugenius IV, founded the college of acolytes to add to the beauty of public worship and to form a learned and pious clergy; the school still exists. This institution was necessary because, with the establishment of the University of Verona, the cathedral school had been suppressed, and the young clerics who attended the university were at that time dispensed from officiating in church functions: the acolytes of the new college were obliged both to study and to attend ecclesiastical functions. Ermolao Barbaro also did much for the reform of the diocese.

Cardinal Giovanni Michiel (1471) restored the cathedral and the episcopal palace. Agostino Valier (1565) was a cardinal. During the episcopate of Giovanni Bragadin, on 6 July 1751, the Patriarchate of Aquileia was suppressed, and the cathedral Chapter of Verona, which had been under the jurisdiction of the Patriarchate since 813, was returned by Pope Benedict XIV to the jurisdiction of the bishops of Verona; he also laid down rules for the government of the diocese.

Giovanni Andrea Avogadro (1790–1805), who had been a Jesuit before the suppression of the Society of Jesus in 1773 by Pope Clement XIV, abdicated the see of Verona in 1805, to return to the Society of Jesus.

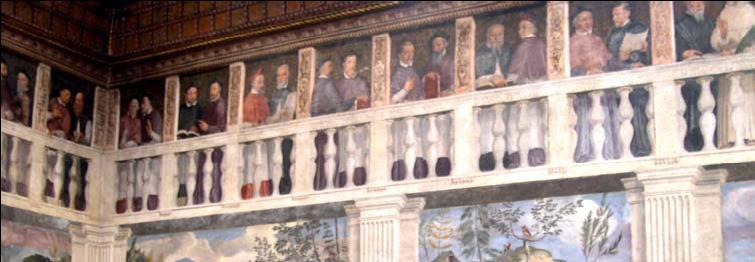
A series of portraits by Domenico Riccio of the bishops of Verona, from Euprepius to Cardinal Agostino Valerio. Palazzo del Vescovado di Verona.

=== Councils and Synods ===
On 23 November 995, a provincial council was held by the Patriarch John of Aquileia to decide the ownership of several churches which were claimed by Bishop Obertus of Verona. In 1014, Pope Benedict VIII and the Emperor Henry I held a synod at Verona to decide issues which were being litigated between the Patriarch of Grado and the Patriarch of Aquileia.

Councils of Verona worthy of note are those of 4 November 1184, at which pope Lucius III presided, in the presence of the Emperor Frederick Barbarossa, and 1276, against the Bogomilian Patarenes, who were somewhat numerous in the Veronese territory, even among the clergy.

Bishop Giovanni Matteo Giberti (1524–1543) held a diocesan synod, the enactments of which were published in 1589, under the direction of Cardinal Augustino Valerio.

Bishop Marco Giustiniani (1631–1649) held two diocesan synods, one in 1633 and the other in 1636. Bishop Sebastiano Pisani (seniore) (1653–1668) held a diocesan synod in Verona in 1655. Bishop Sebastiano Pisani (iuniore) (1668–1690) held two diocesan synods, in 1675 and 1685.

A diocesan synod was held in November 1782 by Bishop Giovanni Morosini, O.S.B. (1772–1789)

=== Religious Orders ===
The Congregation of the Stimmatini was founded at Verona, on 4 November 1816. The Sons of the Sacred Heart of Jesus, founded on 1 June 1867 by Saint Daniele Comboni, have their mother-house and their college for the Central African missions in Verona.

=== Suffragan ===
The diocese was a suffragan first of the Patriarchate of Aquileia, then, from 6 July 1751, of the Roman Catholic Archdiocese of Udine.

The violent expansionist military policies of the French Revolutionary Republic brought confusion and dislocation to the Po Valley. From 1797 to 1802, Napoleon Bonaparte's Cisalpine Republic and its successor from 1802 to 1805, the so-called Italian Republic, brought the French occupation right up to the western bank of the Adige River, bringing the loss to Verona of everything to the west. Their successor, the Napoleonic Kingdom of Italy (1805–1814) gobbled up Verona itself, and transformed its territory into a French-style "department", called the Adige, with Verona as its capital. Following the redistribution of European territories at the Congress of Vienna, the Papacy faced the difficult task of restoring and restructuring the Church in various territories, according to the wishes of their rulers. Verona was in the territory which had been handed over to Austria, and therefore a Concordat had to be negotiated with the government of the Emperor Francis. One of the requirements of the Austrian government was the elimination of several metropolitanates and the suppression of a number of bishoprics which were no longer viable due to the bad climate (malaria and cholera) and the impoverishment of the dioceses due to migration and industrialization; it was expected that this would be done to the benefit of the Patriarchate of Venice.

Pope Pius VII, therefore, issued the bull "De Salute Dominici Gregis" on 1 May 1818, embodying the conclusions of arduous negotiations. Caprularum (Caorle) and Torcella were suppressed and their territories assigned to the Patriarchate of Venice; Belluno and Feltre were united under a single bishop, aeque personaliter, and assigned to Venice; the metropolitan archbishopric of Udine was abolished and its bishop made suffragan to Venice. Padua and Verona became suffragans of Venice, and in a complex rearrangement of diocesan boundaries, Verona lost the parish of Santa Maria de Cinto to the diocese of Padua.

== Bishops of Verona ==
=== to 1200 ===
- Euprepius (I-II/c. 220)
- Dimidriano (220-c. 240)
- Simplicio (240-c. 260)
- Procolo (260-c. 304)
- Saturnino (304-c. 330)
- Lucilius (attested 342–356)

...

- Zeno (4th cent.)

...

- Syagrius(c. 380)

...

- Petronius (c. 410)

...

- Servusdei (attested 502)
- Theodorus (d. c. 522)
- Valens (attested 531)

...

- Solacius (c. 571–577)

...

- Junior (attested 589–591)

...

- Dominicus (between 712 and 744)

...

- Anno (attested 750–774)

...

- Eginus (resigned 799)
- Rotaldus (c. 799–c. 840)
- Notting (840–844)
- Landericus (attested 847)
- Billongus
- Audo
- Astulfus (attested 866)
- Adelardus (c. 876–914)
- Notker (915–928)
- Hilduinus, O.S.B. (928–931)
- Ratherius (931-934 and 962-968)
- Manasses of Arles (935–946)
- Milo (948–961 and 968–981)
- Hildericus (attested 987–988)
- Othbertus (attested 992–1008)
- Hiltprandus (attested 1013–1014)
- Joannes (attested 1016–1037)
- Walter (1037–1055)
- Dietpold (Theobaldus) (1055–1061?)
- Adalbero (attested 1063–1068)
- Huswardus (Usuardo) (attested 1071–1072?)
- Bruno (1072–1076?)
- Sigebodo 1080–1094
- Valbruno 1094–1095
- Valfredo 1095–1101
- Ezelone 1101
- Bertoldus (attested 1102–1107)
- ? Zufetus (1109–1111)
- Ubertus 1111
- Sigifredus 1113–?
- Bernardo 1119–1135
- Tebaldo 1135–1157
- Ognibene 1157–1185
- Riprandus (1185–1188)
- Adelardus (1188–1214)

=== 1200 to 1500 ===
- Norandinus (1214–1224)
- Albertus (1224–1225)
- Jacobus de Braganza (1225–1254)
- Gerardo Cossadoca (1255–1259)
- Manfredo Roberti (1260–1268)
- Aleardino (not possessed) (1268)
- Guido della Scala (1268–1270)

Sede vacante (1270–1276)

- Temidius (1275–1277)
- Bartolomeo 1277–1290
- Pietro della Scala (1291–1295)
- Buonincontro (1295–1298)
- Teobaldo 1298–1331
- Nicolò 1331–1336
- Bartolomeo Della Scala (1336–1338)

Sede vacante (1338–1343)

- Matteo Riboldi 1343–1348
- Pietro de Pino 1348–1349
- Giovanni di Naso 1349–1350
- Pietro Della Scala 1350–1387
- Adelardo 1387–1388
- Giacomo Rossi (1388–1406)
- Angelo Barbarigo (1406–1409 Resigned)
- Guido Memo (29 Nov 1409 – 1438)
- Cardinal Francesco Condulmer (1438–1453)
- Ermolao Barbaro (1453–1471)
- Cardinal Giovanni Michiel (1471–1503)

=== 1500 to 1800 ===
- Cardinal Marco Cornaro (1503–1524) Administrator
- Giovanni Matteo Giberti (1524–1543)
- Pietro Lippomano (1544–1548)
- Luigi Lippomano (1548–1558)
- Agostino Lippomano (20 Jul 1558 – 16 Jul 1560 Died)
- Girolamo Trevisani, O.P. (15 Jan 1561 – 2 Sep 1562 Died)
- Cardinal Bernardo Navagero (1562–1565) Administrator
- Agostino Valier (Valeri, Valieri) (15 May 1565 – 23 May 1606 Died)
- Alberto Valier (1606 – 1 Sep 1630 Died)
- Marco Giustiniani (1631–1649)

Sede vacante (1649–1653)

- Sebastiano Pisani (seniore) (1653–1668 Resigned)
- Sebastiano Pisani (iuniore) (1668–1690)
- Pietro Leoni (26 Nov 1691 – 17 Dec 1697 Died)
- Giovanni Francesco Barbarigo (1698–1714)
- Marco Gradenigo (1714–1725)
- Francesco Trevisani (1725–1732)
- Giovanni Bragadino (Bragadin) (1733–1758)
- Nicolò Antonio Giustiniani, O.S.B. (1759–1772)
- Giovanni Morosini, O.S.B. (1772–1789)
- Giovanni Andrea Avogadro, S.J. (1790–1805 Resigned)

=== since 1800 ===
Sede vacante (1805–1807)

- Innocenzo Maria Liruti, O.S.B. (1807–1827)
- Giuseppe Grasser (1828–1839)
- Pietro Aurelio Mutti, O.S.B. (1840–1852)
- Giuseppe Luigi Trevisanato (15 Mar 1852 – 27 Sep 1852 Confirmed Archbishop of Udine)
- Luigi Guglielmi (27 Sep 1852 – 29 Jan 1853)
- Benedetto Riccabona de Reinchenfels (7 Apr 1854 – 22 Mar 1861 Confirmed Bishop of Trento)
- Luigi di Canossa (30 Sep 1861 – 12 Mar 1900)
- Bartolomeo Bacilieri (12 Mar 1900 – 14 Feb 1923)
- Girolamo Cardinale (25 May 1923 – 26 Dec 1954)
- Andrea Pangrazio as Apostolic Administrator 1954 – 1955
- Giovanni Urbani as Archbishop (personal title) (14 Apr 1955 – 11 Nov 1958 Appointed Patriarch of Venice)
- Giuseppe Carraro (15 Dec 1958 – 18 May 1978 Retired)
- Giuseppe Amari (15 Mar 1978 – 30 Jun 1992 Retired)
- Attilio Nicora (30 Jun 1992 – 18 Sep 1997 Resigned)
- Flavio Roberto Carraro, O.F.M. Cap. (25 Jul 1998 – 8 May 2007 Retired)
- Giuseppe Zenti (8 May 2007 – 2 July 2022 Retired)
- Domenico Pompili (2 July 2022 — )

== See also ==
- History of Verona
- Timeline of Verona
- Parish Church of San Giorgio di Valpolicella

== Books ==
=== Episcopal lists ===
- Eubel, Conradus, ed. (1913). Hierarchia catholica (in Latin). Vol. 1 (second ed.). Münster: Libreria Regensbergiana.
- Eubel, Conradus, ed. (1914). Hierarchia catholica (in Latin). Vol. 2 (second ed.). Münster: Libreria Regensbergiana.
- Eubel, Conradus; Gulik, Guilelmus, eds. (1923). Hierarchia catholica (in Latin). Vol. 3 (second ed.). Münster: Libreria Regensbergiana.
- Gams, Pius Bonifatius (1873). Series episcoporum Ecclesiae catholicae: quotquot innotuerunt a beato Petro apostolo (in Latin). Ratisbon: Typis et Sumptibus Georgii Josephi Manz. pp. 804–806.
- Gauchat, Patritius (Patrice) (1935). Hierarchia catholica (in Latin). Vol. Tomus IV (1592-1667). Münster: Libraria Regensbergiana.
- Ritzler, Remigius; Sefrin, Pirminus (1952). Hierarchia catholica medii et recentis aevi (in Latin). Vol. Tomus V (1667-1730). Patavii: Messagero di S. Antonio.
- Ritzler, Remigius; Sefrin, Pirminus (1958). Hierarchia catholica medii et recentis aevi (in Latin). Vol. Tomus VI (1730-1799). Patavii: Messagero di S. Antonio.
- Ritzler, Remigius; Sefrin, Pirminus (1968). Hierarchia Catholica medii et recentioris aevi (in Latin). Vol. VII (1800–1846). Monasterii: Libreria Regensburgiana.
- Ritzler, Remigius; Sefrin, Pirminus (1978). Hierarchia catholica Medii et recentioris aevi (in Latin). Vol. VIII (1846–1903). Il Messaggero di S. Antonio.
- Pięta, Zenon (2002). Hierarchia catholica medii et recentioris aevi (in Latin). Vol. IX (1903–1922). Padua: Messagero di San Antonio. ISBN 978-88-250-1000-8.

=== Studies ===
- Biancolini, Giambatista (1749). Notizie storiche delle chiese di Verona (in Italian). Vol. Libro primo. Verona: Per Alessandro Scolari. ISBN 978-88-271-1700-2. Biancolini, Giovanni Battista G. (1749). Libro secondo. Biancolini, Giovanni Battista G. (1750). Libro terzo. Biancolini, Giovanni Battista G. (1752). Libro quatro. Biancolini, Giovanni Battista G. (1761). Libro quinto. Biancolini, Giambattista (1765). Libro sesto. Biancolini, Giovanni Battista G. (1766). Libro settimo. Biancolini, Giovanni Battista G. (1771). Libro ottavo. [many documents published]
- Biancolini, Giambattista (1760). Serie cronologica dei vescovi e governatori di Verona (in Italian). Verona: D. Ramanzini.
- Cappelletti, Giuseppe (1854). Le chiese d'Italia dalla loro origine sino ai nostri giorni (in Italian). Vol. decimo (10). Venezia: G. Antonelli. pp. 727–817.
- Ederle, Guglielmo; Cervato, Dario (2002). I vescovi di Verona: dizionario storico e cenni sulla Chiesa veronese (in Italian). Verona: Della Scala. ISBN 978-88-85099-58-6.
- Kehr, Paul Fridolin (1923). Italia Pontificia Vol. VII:l Venetiae et Histria, Pars I: Provincia Aquileiensis. Berlin: Weidmann, pp. 212–304. (in Latin).
- Lanzoni, Francesco (1927). Le diocesi d'Italia dalle origini al principio del secolo VII (an. 604). Faenza: F. Lega, pp. 919–934. (in Italian)
- Rossi, Maria Clara (2003). Governare una Chiesa. Vescovi e clero a Verona nella prima metà del Trecento. Verona: Cierre. (in Italian)
- Schwartz, Gerhard (1907). Die Besetzung der Bistümer Reichsitaliens unter den sächsischen und salischen Kaisern: mit den Listen der Bischöfe, 951-1122. Leipzig: B.G. Teubner. pp. 62–70. (in German)
- Ughelli, Ferdinando (1720). Italia Sacra sive De Episcopis Italiae et insularum adjacentium (in Latin). Vol. Tomus quintus. Venezia: apud Sebastianum Coleti. pp. 655–1025.
