= Diocese of Vittorio Veneto =

Roman Catholic diocese in Italy

Diocese of Vittorio Veneto Dioecesis Victoriensis Venetorum

Catholic
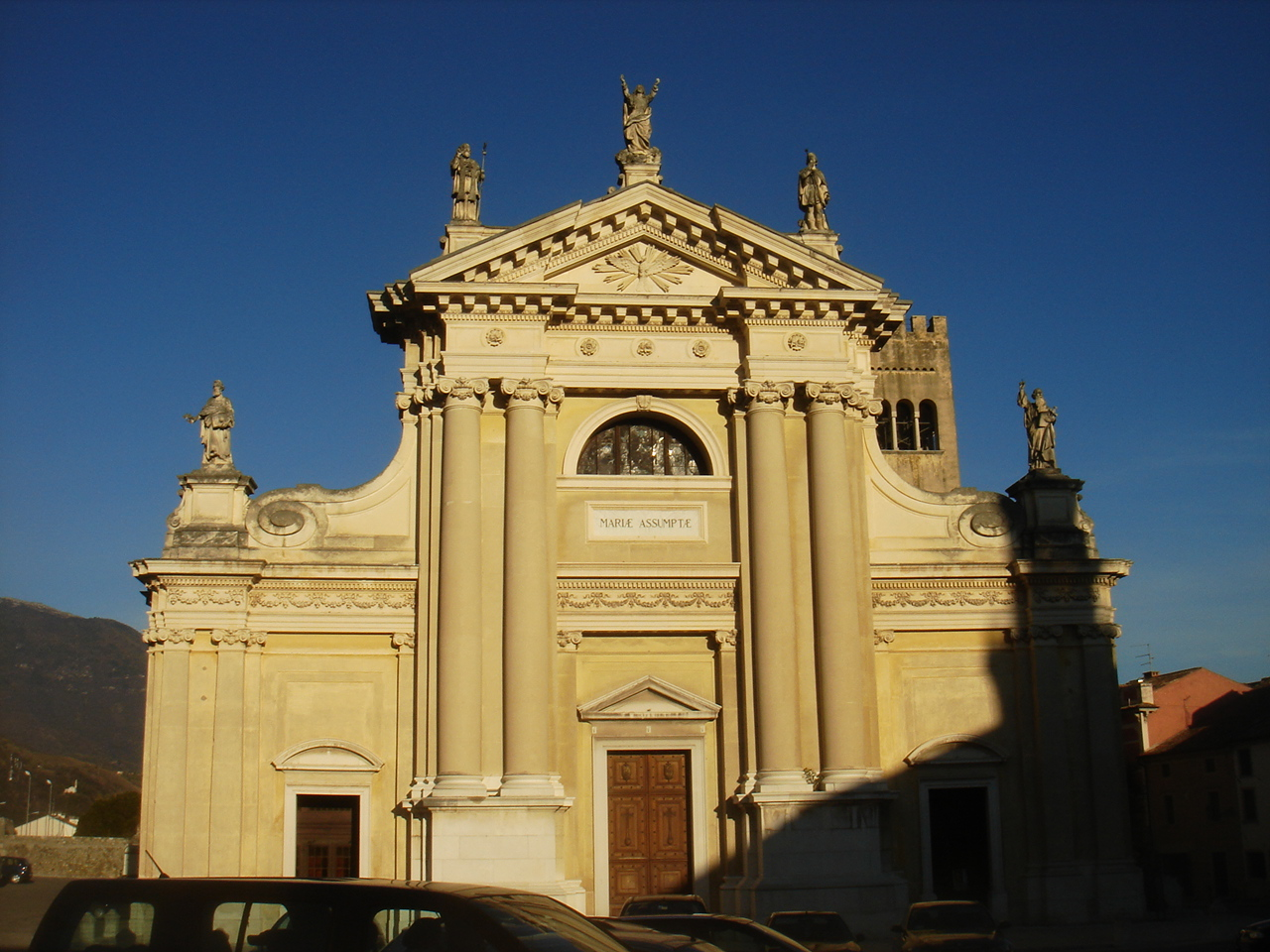
- Cathedral in Vittorio Veneto

Location
- Country: Italy
- Ecclesiastical province: Venice

Statistics
- Area: 1,420 km^{2} (550 sq mi)
- Population: Total; Catholics: (as of 2023); 374,500 (est.) ▼; 324,700 (guess) ▼
- Parishes: 162

Information
- Denomination: Catholic Church
- Rite: Roman Rite
- Established: 7th century
- Cathedral: Cattedrale di S. Maria Assunta
- Secular priests: 149 (diocesan) ▼60 (religious orders) ▲35 permanent deacons

Current leadership
- Pope: Leo XIV
- Bishop: Riccardo Battocchio
- Bishops emeritus: Corrado Pizziolo

Map

Website
- www.diocesivittorioveneto.it

The Diocese of Vittorio Veneto (Latin: Dioecesis Victoriensis Venetorum) is a Latin diocese of the Catholic Church in northeastern Italy, with its see in Vittorio Veneto. It was historically known as Diocese of Ceneda, the name being changed in 1939.

Ceneda began as a suffragan of the patriarchate of Aquileia until the latter's suppression in 1751. From 1752 until 1818 Ceneda was a suffragan of the archdiocese of Udine. Since 1818 Ceneda has been in the ecclesiastical province headed by the Patriarchate of Venice. Art from several churches in the diocese is housed in its Albino Luciani Diocesan Museum.

== History ==
The city of Vittorio Veneto includes the town of Ceneda which in ancient times was a castrum known as Ceneta and poetically as Acedum. The city is situated in the province of Treviso, 7 miles (12 km) north of Conegliano.

Ceneda was pillaged by Attila the Hun in 452, and a century later by Totila. After 568, during the domination of the Lombards, it was governed by a duke and then a count. Still later it became part of the marquisate of Treviso.

The Gospel is said to have been preached in the region in the first century by St. Fortunatus, deacon of bishop Hermagoras of Aquileia. His legend puts him, rather, in the 4th century. Attesting to the presence of Christianity is one of the earliest pieve (parish) of the diocese, Sant'Andrea di Bigonzo, which dates from the fourth century.

However, the historical beginning of episcopal see of Ceneda is uncertain. There may have been a bishop present in Ceneda very soon after the Lombard conquest. The first reputed bishop seems to have been Vindemius who was present in 579 at the Synod of Grado which continued the Schism of the Three Chapters. He was, however, bishop of Cissa in Istria, not bishop of Ceneda.

In 680, Bishop Ursinus was present at the Council of Rome convened by Pope Agatho against the Monothelites. In 685, the Lombard duke Grumoaldo assigned to the bishop of Ceneda a large part of the territory that had formerly been under the care of Oderzo to counter the claims of Oderzo's bishop in exile. The city of Oderzo had, in fact, been destroyed by the King Rotharius (636-652) and King Grimoaldus (662-671), and its people sought refuge with the Byzantines in the Venetian lagoon, at Forumjulii, Treviso, and Ceneda. A patron saint of the diocese of Ceneda is actually a bishop of Oderzo, Titianus, whose body is said to have miraculously been carried up the Livenza River against the current and to have come to rest at the site of the present cathedral after being carried in a cart by a donkey.

From 994 the bishop of that city became also its temporal lord, even after it was politically incorporated into the Republic of Venice in 1389.

Bishop Sigifredo, during whose time there were many conflicts between Ceneda and the neighbouring towns, was allied with the bishop of Belluno and the people of Padua in a war against Trevento. In September 1179, Sigifredo promised his ally, the Count of Conegliano, that he would transfer the episcopal seat of Ceneda to Conegliano. The damage to Ceneda and the neighboring territory was so serious that Pope Innocent III actually authorized Bishop Matteo on 25 March 1199 to remove of the episcopal seat from Ceneda to Conegliano, but the seat remained where it was.

Other bishops were Antonio Correr (1409); Lorenzo da Ponte (1739), the last bishop to exercise temporal power, and Albino Luciani (1958–1969) who became pope John Paul I in 1978.

In 1586, Bishop Marco Antonio Mocenigo (1586–1597) and Cardinal Enrico Caetani, the papal legate in Bologna, conducted the foundation ceremonies for the episcopal seminary in Ceneda.

Bishop Sebastiano Pisani (seniore) (1639–1653) presided over a diocesan synod in Ceneda on 11–13 September 1642. Bishop Pietro Leoni (1667–1691) held a diocesan synod in Ceneda on 9–11 November 1670. On 20–22 June 1695, Bishop Marco Agassi held a diocesan synod. Bishop Francesco Trevisan (1710–1725) held a diocesan synod in 1721. A diocesan synod was held by Bishop Lorenzo da Ponte (1739–1768) on 24–26 June 1743.

=== Post-Napoleonic reorganization ===
The violent expansionist military policies of the French Revolutionary Republic, the First French Empire, and the Napoleonic kingdom of Italy had brought confusion and dislocation to the Po Valley. Following the redistribution of European territories at the Congress of Vienna (1815), the Papacy faced the task of restoring and restructuring the Church in various territories, according to the wishes of their rulers. Padua and Venice were under the control of Austria, and therefore a Concordat had to be negotiated with the government of the Emperor Francis. One of the requirements of the Austrian government was the elimination of several metropolitanates and the suppression of a number of bishoprics which were no longer viable due to the bad climate (malaria and cholera) and the impoverishment of the dioceses due to migration and industrialization; it was expected that this would be done to the benefit of the Patriarchate of Venice.

Pope Pius VII, therefore, issued the bull "De Salute Dominici Gregis" on 1 May 1818, embodying the conclusions of arduous negotiations. Ceneda became a suffragan of Venice.

The diocese of Ceneda also gained a number of parishes from the diocese of Udine.

On November 22, 1866, soon after the Veneto was annexed by the Kingdom of Italy, Ceneda and Serravalle were joined into one municipality, which was called Vittorio, in honor of the King of Italy, Vittorio Emanuele. The Vatican, which had lost the Papal States to the new Kingdom of Italy, was not inclined to honor the king, and therefore kept the name Ceneda as the title of the diocese. In World War I, the last major campaign of Italian troops against the Austrian Empire was fought near Vittorio between 24 October and 4 November 1918. In commemoration of the victory, the name of the city of Vittorio was changed to Vittorio Veneto in 1923.

Just before the beginning of the Second World War, the Vatican recognized the change of name which had taken place 16 years earlier, and adopted the title of Diocese of Vittorio Veneto.

== Shrines ==
Within the confines of the diocese is the Basilica of Motta di Livenza, built near the spot where Giovanni Cigana reported the Blessed Virgin Mary appeared to him on March 9, 1510 during his praying of the rosary. She was said to have asked him and the inhabitants of the area to fast as an act of repentance for sin for at least three consecutive Saturdays, pray to God for mercy, and to build a basilica on the site so that people could come for prayer. Pope Julius II, approving of the devotion of the Observant Franciscans in wishing to build a convent to service the cult of the Virgin Mary, granted their petition on 15 August 1510, the feast of the Assumption.

== Diocesan patrons ==
- San Tiziano - feast day January 16
- Sant'Augusta di Serravalle - feast day August 27; March 27 in the Roman Martyrology

== Bishops ==
=== Diocese of Ceneda ===
Erected: 7th century
Latin name: Cenetensis

[Vindemius (579–591?)]

- Ursinus (attested 680)

[Satinus (731)]

- Valentinianus (712–740)
- Maximus (attested 742)
- Dulcissimus (attested 794)
- Emmo (attested 827)
- Ripaldus (attested 908)

==== from 950 to 1300 ====
Bishops of Ceneda and Counts of Ceneda:

- Sicard (962–997)
- Grauso (attested 1001)
- Bruno (c. 1013)
- Helminger (attested 1021–1031)
- Almanguino (attested 1053)
- Giovanni (attested 1074)
- Ropertus (attested 1124)
- Sigismondo (1130 ?)
- Azzone Degli Azzoni (attested 1140–1152)
- Aimone (date uncertain)
- Sigisfredo da Conegliano (attested 1170–1184)
- Matteo di Siena (1187–1216)
- Gherardo da Camino (1217)
- Alberto Da Camino (1220–1242)
- Warnerio da Polcenigo (Guarnieri da Polcenigo) (1242–1251)
- Rugerinus di Aquileia (1251–1257)
- Biachino di Camino (1257)
- Alberto Da Collo (1257–1261) Bishop-elect
- Odorico (1261)
- Presavio Novello (Prosapio Novello) (1262–1279)
- Marzio da Fiabiane (Marco da Fabiane) (1279–1285)
- Pietro Calza (1286–1300)

==== from 1300 to 1600 ====
- Francesco Arpo, O.P. (1300–1310)
- Manfredus di Collalto (1310–1320)
- Francesco Ramponi (1320–1348)
- Gausberto de Orgoglio (1349–1374)
- Oliviero da Verona (1374–1377)
- Francesco Calderini (1378–1381?)
- Giorgio Torti (1381–1383)
- Marco Porri (Marco De'Porris) (1383–1394),

After 1389 the bishops retain the title of count, but their duties are as civil magistrates of the Venetian Republic.

- Martino de' Franceschinis (Martino Franceschini) (1394–1399)
- Pietro Marcello (1399–1409)
- Antonio Correr, O.P. (1409–1445)
- Pietro Leon (1445–1474)
- Nicolò Trevisan (1474–1498)
- Francesco Brevio (1498–1508)
- Marino Grimani (1508–1517)
- Domenico Grimani (1517–1520)
- Giovanni Grimani (1520–1531)
- Marino Grimani (1532–1540)
- Giovanni Grimani (1540–1545), second time
- Marino Grimani (1545–1546)
- Michele della Torre (1547–1586), named cardinal 1583
- Marco Antonio Mocenigo (1586–1597)

==== from 1600 to 1786 ====
- Leonardo Mocenigo (1599–1623)
- Piero Valier (1623–1625), translated to Padua
- Marco Giustiniani (1625–1631)
- Marcantonio Bragadin (1633–1639)
- Sebastiano Pisani (seniore) (1639–1653)
- Albertino Barisoni (1653–1667)
- Pietro Leoni (1667–1691)
- Marcantonio Agazzi (1692–1710)
- Francesco Trevisan (1710–1725)
- Benedetto De Luca (1725–1739)
- Lorenzo da Ponte (1739–1768)
- Giannagostino Gradenigo (1768–1774 Died)
- Giampaolo Dolfin (1774–1777 Appointed, Bishop of Bergamo)
- Marco Zaguri (1777–1785)
- Pietro Antonio Zorzi, CRS (1786–1792)

==== from 1786 to 1939 ====
- Giambenedetto Falier (1792–1821 died)
- Giacomo Monico (1823–1827)
- Bernardo Antonino Squarcina, OP (1828–1842)
- Manfredo Giovanni Battista Bellati (1843–1869 died)
- Corradino Cavriani (1871–1885)
- Sigismondo Brandolini Rota (1885–1908)
- Andrea Caron (1908–1912)
- Rodolfo Caroli (1913–1917)
- Eugenio Beccegato (1917–1943)

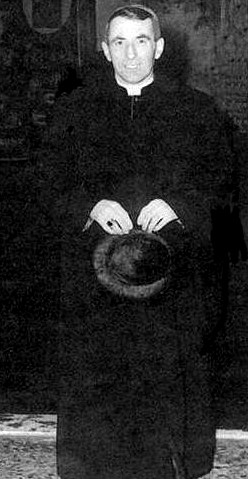
Bishop Albino Luciani Pope John Paul I

=== Diocese of Vittorio Veneto ===
Name changed: 13 May 1939
Latin name: Victoriensis Venetorum
Metropolitan: Patriarchate of Venice

- Giuseppe Zaffonato (1945–1956)
- Giuseppe Carraro (1956–1958)
- Albino Luciani (1958–1969)
- Antonio Cunial (1970–1982)
- Eugenio Ravignani (1983–1997)
- Alfredo Magarotto (1997–2003)
- Giuseppe Zenti (2003–2007)
- Corrado Pizziolo (2007–2024)
- Riccardo Battocchio (24 Feb 2025 - present )

== Bibliography ==
=== Reference works for bishops ===
- Gams, Pius Bonifatius (1873). Series episcoporum Ecclesiae catholicae: quotquot innotuerunt a beato Petro apostolo (in Latin). Ratisbon: Typis et Sumptibus Georgii Josephi Manz. pp. 783–785.
- Eubel, Conradus, ed. (1913). Hierarchia catholica (in Latin). Vol. 1 (Tomus I) (second ed.). Münster: Libreria Regensbergiana. (in Latin)
- Eubel, Conradus, ed. (1914). Hierarchia catholica (in Latin). Vol. 2 (Tomus II) (second ed.). Münster: Libreria Regensbergiana.
- Eubel, Conradus; Gulik, Guilelmus, eds. (1923). Hierarchia catholica (in Latin). Vol. 3 (Tomus III) (second ed.). Münster: Libreria Regensbergiana.
- Gauchat, Patritius (Patrice) (1935). Hierarchia catholica. Vol. 4 (Tomus IV) (1592–1667). Münster: Libraria Regensbergiana.
- Ritzler, Remigius; Sefrin, Pirminus (1952). Hierarchia catholica medii et recentis aevi. Vol. 5 (Tomus V) (1667–1730). Patavii: Messagero di S. Antonio.
- Ritzler, Remigius; Sefrin, Pirminus (1958). Hierarchia catholica medii et recentis aevi. Vol. 6 (Tomus VI) (1730–1799). Patavii: Messagero di S. Antonio.
- Ritzler, Remigius; Sefrin, Pirminus (1968). Hierarchia Catholica medii et recentioris aevi (in Latin). Vol. VII (1800–1846). Monasterii: Libreria Regensburgiana.
- Remigius Ritzler; Pirminus Sefrin (1978). Hierarchia catholica Medii et recentioris aevi (in Latin). Vol. VIII (1846–1903). Il Messaggero di S. Antonio.
- Pięta, Zenon (2002). Hierarchia catholica medii et recentioris aevi (in Latin). Vol. IX (1903–1922). Padua: Messagero di San Antonio. ISBN 978-88-250-1000-8.

=== Studies ===
- Bechevolo, Rino; Sartori, Basilio (1979). Ceneda, la cattedrale e i suoi vecchi oratori (in Italian). Vittorio Veneto (TV): TIPSE.
- Botteo, Vincenzy (1907). Un documento prezioso riguardo alle origini del vescovado di Ceneda: e la serie dei vescovi cenedesi corretta e documentata, illustrazione critico-storica (in Italian). Conegliano: Arti Grafiche.
- Cappelletti, Giuseppe (1854), Le chiese d'Italia Volume decimo (10) Venezia. Giuseppe Antonelli, pp. 221–320. (in Italian)
- Kehr, Paul Fridolin (1923). Italia Pontificia Vol. VII:l Venetiae et Histria, Pars I: Provincia Aquileiensis. Berlin: Weidmann. (in Latin).
- Lanzoni, Francesco (1927). Le diocesi d'Italia dalle origini al principio del secolo VII (an. 604). Faenza: F. Lega, pp. 902–904. (in Italian)
- Minotto, A.-S. (ed.). Acta et diplomata e R. Tabulario Veneto. Documenta ad Belunum, Cenetam, Feltria, Tarvisum spectantia. (in Italian and Latin). Vol. II,1 Venezia: Cecchini, 1871.
- Riponti, Danilo (2014). L'inquisizione nella diocesi di Ceneda (in Italian). Antilia. ISBN 978-88-97336-23-5.
- Schwartz, Gerhard (1907). Die Besetzung der Bistümer Reichsitaliens unter den sächsischen und salischen Kaisern: mit den Listen der Bischöfe, 951-1122. Leipzig: B.G. Teubner. pp. 45–46. (in German)
- Tomasi, Giovanni (1998). La Diocesi di Ceneda: chiese e uomini dalle origini al 1586 (in Italian). Vol. 2 vols. Vittorio Veneto (Treviso): Diocesi di Vittorio Veneto.
- Ughelli, Ferdinando; Coleti, Niccolo (1720). Italia sacra sive de Episcopis Italiae (in Latin). Vol. 5. Venice: Apud Sebastianum Coleti. pp. 170–226.
