= Andrea Bertoni =

Italian Roman Catholic priest

Blessed Andrea "Giacomo Filippo" Bertoni O.S.M.

Priest
- Born: 1454; Faenza, Papal States
- Died: 25 May 1483 (aged 29); Faenza, Papal States
- Venerated in: Roman Catholic Church
- Beatified: 22 July 1761, Saint Peter's Basilica, Papal States by Pope Clement XIII
- Major shrine: Faenza Cathedral, Italy
- Feast: 23 May (Diocese of Faenza); 25 May; 30 May (Servites)
- Attributes: Servite habit Crucifix
- Patronage: Faenza

Andrea Bertoni (1454 - 25 May 1483) was an Italian Roman Catholic priest and a professed member of the Servite Order. Bertoni assumed the religious name of "Giacomo Filippo" upon being admitted to the Servites and he became the procurator of the convent he lived in from his appointment until his death.

The approval of the late priest's "cultus" (or popular devotion) on 22 July 1761 acted as Pope Clement XIII's conferral of beatification upon the late priest, while the town of Faenza - where Bertoni hailed from - appointed him as its patron in 1762.

== Life ==
Andrea Bertoni was born in Faenza to poor parents in 1454. He often frequented the churches in his area during his childhood and possessed an ardent devotion to the Mass.

He joined the Servite Order in 1453 at the age of nine and was later ordained to the priesthood following the successful completion of his theological and philosophical studies that were required for ordination. He was made the procurator of his convent in Faenza from the appointment until his death. Bertoni assumed the religious name of "Giacomo Filippo" upon making his profession. He dreaded offending God so underwent frequent confession. He also - on one occasion - healed an ill monk after making the sign of the Cross over the latter three times. His first biographer was Nicolò Borghese, who Bertoni once cured; Borghese wrote a chronicle of the priest's life three months before the latter died.

On 24 May 1483, he visited his fellow Servites and asked for their prayers due to his ill health.

Bertoni died on 25 May 1483 as he recited the Divine Office and kissed a Crucifix that he was holding in his hands. His remains were re-interred in the Manfredi Chapel on 15 April 1594, while his remains were re-interred once more to the altar of Saint Charles Borromeo in the Faenza Cathedral after the church he was in before was damaged in November 1944 due to World War II.

== Beatification ==
Bertoni was beatified - on 22 July 1761 - after Pope Clement XIII approved of the late priest's "cultus" (or popular following and devotion) while Bertoni was selected as a patron of Faenza in a decree that the council of the town issued on 14 July 1762.
