= Giovanni Battista Bussi (1656–1726) =

Catholic cardinal (1656–1726)

His Eminence Giovanni Battista Bussi
- Cardinal-Priest of Santa Maria in Ara Coeli; Bishop of Ancona e Numana
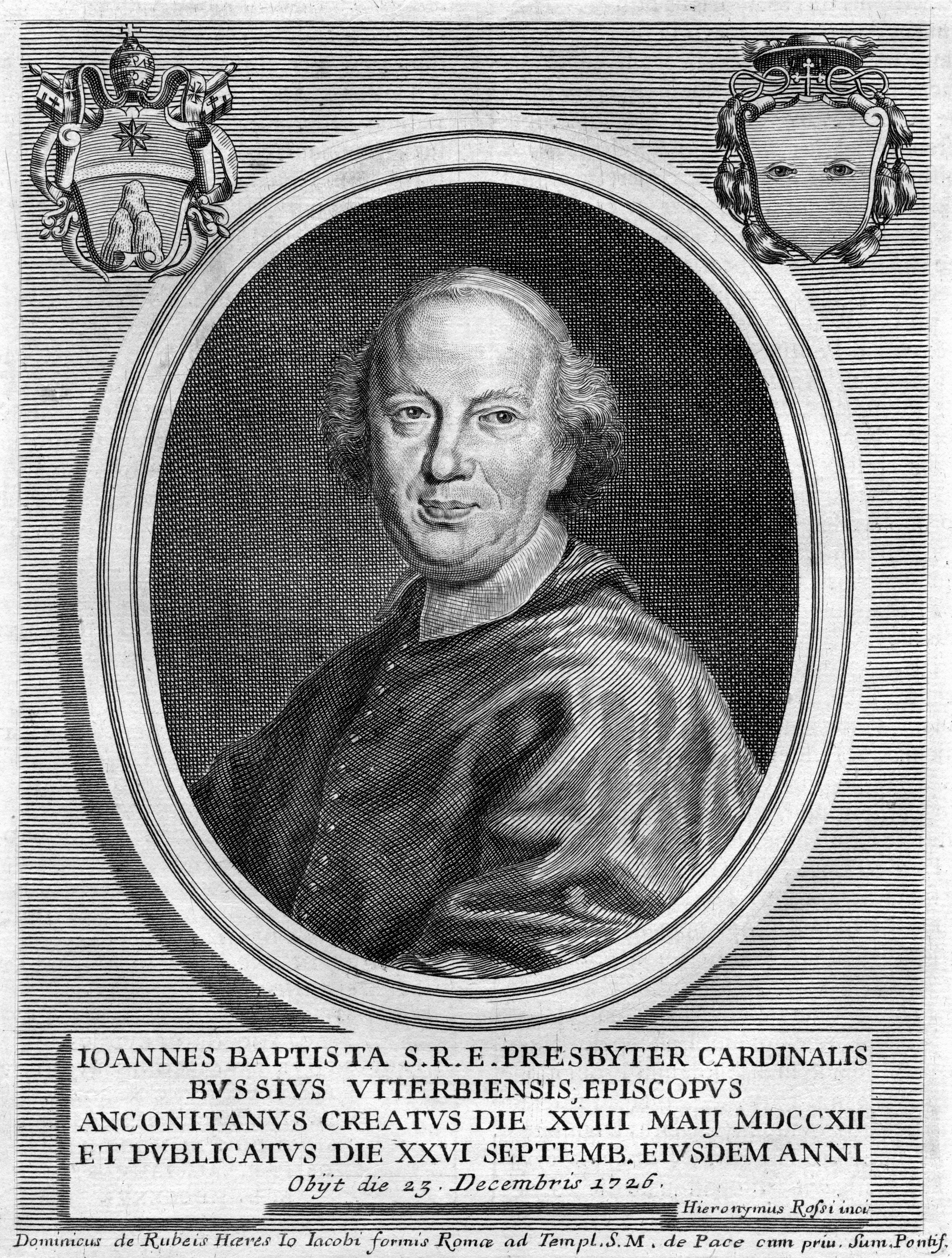
- Portrait of Giovanni Battista Bussi
- Church: Catholic Church

Orders
- Consecration: 12 Sep 1706 by Christian August von Sachsen-Zeitz

Personal details
- Born: 31 March 1656 Viterbo, Italy
- Died: 23 December 1726 (age 69) Rome, Italy

Giovanni Battista Bussi (31 March 1656 in Viterbo – 23 December 1726 in Rome) was an Italian cardinal.

== Life ==
Born in the Papal States to a family which provided many ecclesiastics, Giovanni studied at the archiginnasio della Sapienza and in 1691 was granted a canonry in St Peter's Basilica and entrusted with the management of the Ospedale di Santo Spirito in Sassia nearby by Pope Innocent XII. He was sent to Flanders in 1693 to fight the spread of Jansenism and in 1703 contributed to the condemnation for Jansenism of Petrus Codde, apostolic vicar to Holland and archbishop of Sebaste.

Bussi was elected archbishop of Tarsus in partibus and promoted to the nuntiature of "Germania inferiore" at Cologne. On 12 Sep 1706, he was consecrated bishop by Christian August von Sachsen-Zeitz, Bishop of Győr, with Giulio Piazza, Titular Archbishop of Rhodus, and Johannes Werner von Veyder, Titular Bishop of Eleutheropolis in Macedonia and Auxiliary Bishop of Cologne, serving as co-consecrators. He remained in Germany until his election as archbishop of Ancona on 19 February 1710, and he was later made cardinal by Pope Clement XI in the consistory of 30 January 1713. He headed several congregations (Congregation for Bishops, Congregation for the Clergy, Congregation for Borders, Congregation for the Propagation of the Faith, etc.). He died in Rome and was buried in the basilica of Santa Maria in Trastevere, to the right of the chapel dedicated to saint Frances of Rome.

== Sources ==
- Gaetano Moroni, Bussi Giambattista, Cardinale in Dizionario di erudizione storico-ecclesiastico da S. Pietro sino ai nostri giorni, specialmente intorno ai principali Santi, Beati, Martiri, Padri; compilazione del cavaliere Gaetano Moroni Romano, Venezia, dalla Tipografia Emiliana, 1840. vol. VI, 172-3

Catholic Church titles
Preceded by Orazio Filippo Spada	Apostolic Internuncio to Belgium; 1698–1706	Succeeded by Girolamo Grimaldi
Preceded by Michelangelo dei Conti	Titular Archbishop of Tarsus; 1706–1710	Succeeded by Gerolamo Archinto
Preceded by Giulio Piazza	Apostolic Nuncio to Germany; 1706–1712	Succeeded by Gerolamo Archinto
Preceded by Friedrich Christian von Plettenberg zu Lenhausen	Apostolic Administrator of Münster; 1706–1707	Succeeded by Franz Arnold von Wolff-Metternich zur Gracht
Preceded by Marcello d'Aste	Archbishop (Personal Title) of Ancona e Numana; 1710–1726	Succeeded by Prospero Lorenzo Lambertini
Preceded by Giovanni Francesco Negroni	Cardinal-Priest of Santa Maria in Ara Coeli; 1713–1726	Succeeded by Lorenzo Cozza
