= Giulio Monterenzi =

Italian Roman Catholic prelate

Most Reverend Giulio Monterenzi
- Bishop of Faenza
- Church: Catholic Church
- Diocese: Diocese of Faenza
- In office: 1618–1623
- Predecessor: Erminio Valenti
- Successor: Marco Antonio Gozzadini

Orders
- Consecration: 7 October 1618 by Giovanni Garzia Mellini

Personal details
- Died: 23 May 1623 Faenza, Italy

Giulio Monterenzi (died 23 May 1623) was a Roman Catholic prelate who served as Bishop of Faenza (1618–1623).

== Biography ==
On 1 October 1618, Giulio Monterenzi was appointed during the papacy of Pope Paul V as Bishop of Faenza. On 7 October 1618, he was consecrated bishop by Giovanni Garzia Mellini, Cardinal-Priest of Santi Quattro Coronati, with Ulpiano Volpi, Archbishop Emeritus of Chieti, and Francesco Sacrati (cardinal), Titular Archbishop of Damascus, serving as co-consecrators. He served as Bishop of Faenza until his death on 23 May 1623.

== External links and additional sources ==
- Cheney, David M. "Diocese of Faenza-Modigliana". Catholic-Hierarchy.org. (for Chronology of Bishops) ^{[self-published]}
- Chow, Gabriel. "Diocese of Faenza-Modigliana (Italy)". GCatholic.org. (for Chronology of Bishops) ^{[self-published]}

Catholic Church titles
Preceded by Erminio Valenti	Bishop of Faenza; 1618–1623	Succeeded by Marco Antonio Gozzadini
