= Modigliana Cathedral =

Church building in Modigliana, Italy

Coordinates: 44°09′30″N 11°47′28″E

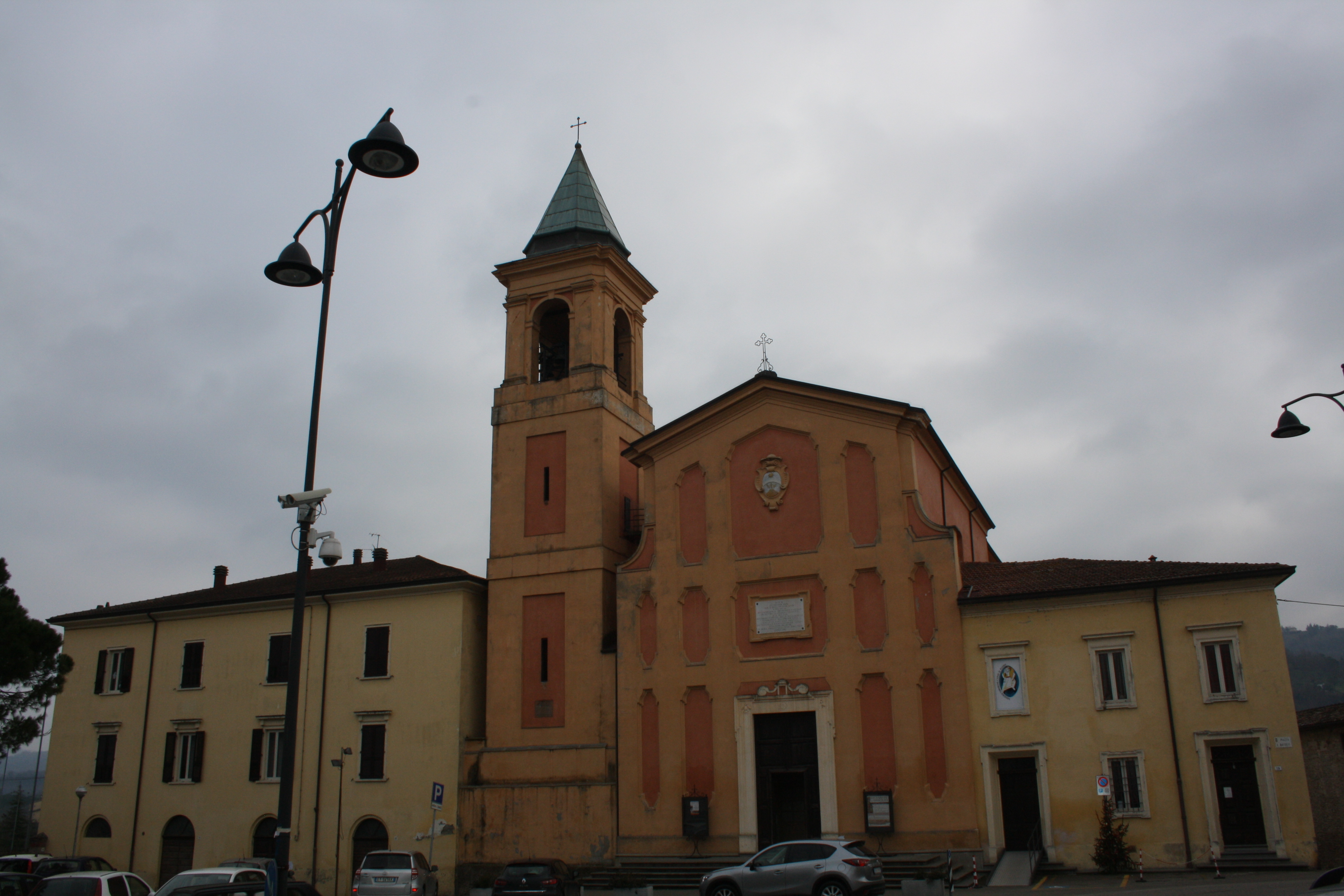
Mondigliana Cathedral.

Modigliana Cathedral, otherwise the Church of Santo Stefano Papa (Italian: Duomo di Modigliana; Concattedrale di Santo Stefano; Chiesa di Santo Stefano papa), is a Roman Catholic cathedral and the principal church of Modigliana in Emilia-Romagna, Italy. It is dedicated to the sainted Pope Stephen I. An ancient church, it was made the seat of the bishops of Modigliana on the creation of the diocese in 1850, and from 1986 has been a co-cathedral in the Diocese of Faenza-Modigliana.

== History and description ==
The cathedral has ancient origins. It was documented for the first time in 892 as the pieve of Santo Stefano in Juviniano; of this building nothing remains except the crypt, thanks to the extreme re-structuring of the 15th century. The new church was dedicated to the same patron by Pope Julius II on the occasion of his passage through the city in 1506 during his pastoral visitation of the province of Romagna.

Further alterations were made in the 18th century, with the addition of the campanile. When the diocese of Modigliana was set up in 1850 the pieve of Santo Stefano became its cathedral.

Features of particular note are the Sanctuary of the Madonna del cantone, built at the back of the apse in the 15th century, and the oratory of the Dead Jesus, built inside the ancient crypt in the 12th century, which today houses the tombs of the bishops who died in Modigliana.
