= Marcello Durazzo =

Italian cardinal (1634–1710)

His Eminence Marcello Durazzo
- Bishop of Faenza
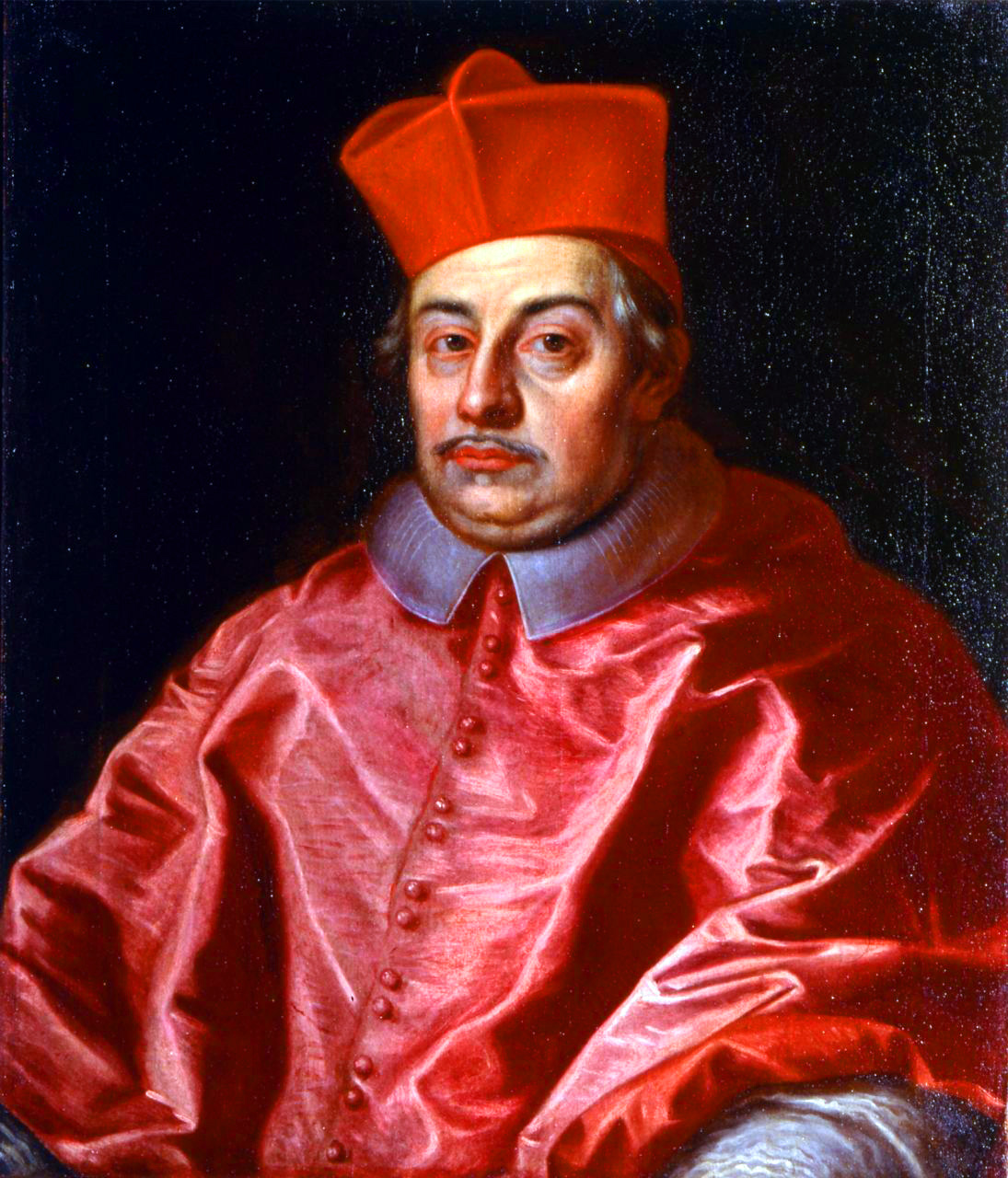
- Portrait by Giovanni Maria Morandi
- Church: Catholic Church
- Diocese: Faenza
- Appointed: 11 November 1697
- Term ended: 12 April 1710
- Predecessor: Giovanni Francesco Negroni
- Successor: Giulio Piazza
- Other posts: Cardinal-Priest of San Pietro in Vincoli (1701-1710)
- Previous posts: Apostolic Nuncio to Savoy (1671–1672); Apostolic Nuncio to Portugal (1673-1685); Apostolic Nuncio to Spain (1685-1686); Cardinal-Priest of Santa Prisca (1689-1701); Bishop of Ferrara (1690-1691); Bishop of Spoleto (1691-1695)

Orders
- Created cardinal: 2 September 1686 by Pope Innocent XI
- Rank: Cardinal-Priest

Personal details
- Born: 6 March 1633 Genoa, Republic of Genoa
- Died: 12 April 1710 (aged 77) Faenza, Italy
- Coat of arms

Marcello Durazzo (Genoa, 6 March 1633 – Faenza, 12 April 1710) was an Italian Catholic Cardinal and Archbishop.

== Biography ==
Marcello Durazzo was born in Genoa in 1633 from a very noble family of the Genoese Republic that had included many prominent figures among its ranks, first of all his father, Cesare Durazzo, who was Doge of Genoa (1665–1667) and had married Giovanna Cervetto. He was also the nephew of Cardinal Stefano Durazzo.

With the intention of undertaking an ecclesiastical career, he enrolled at the University of Perugia where he obtained a doctorate in Ultroque iure.

He was subsequently appointed Protonotary apostolic from 31 January 1660, then becoming governor of Rimini from 1662 to 1663. Governor of Fano in 1663, he became vice-legate in Bologna between 1664 and 1666. Governor of Ancona from 30 September 1666 to 1668, then became governor of the Campagna e Marittima Province from 18 April to November 1668. He was finally appointed governor of Viterbo on 14 December 1668, then moving to the governorship of Perugia from 18 July 1670 to 4 May 1671. He was appointed Referendary of the Tribunal of the Apostolic Signatura in 1671, only then receiving his Holy orders.

Elected titular Titular Archbishop of Chalcedon on 4 May 1671, he became Apostolic nuncio to the Duchy of Savoy from 17 June of that same year until 1672 when, on 28 June, he was appointed assistant to the Papal Throne. Apostolic visitor and governor of Loreto from 1672, he became vice-legate to Avignon from 19 August 1672. Appointed Apostolic nuncio to Portugal from 12 April 1673, after 12 years in Portugal, he moved to the Nunciature in the Kingdom of Spain on 5 May 1685.

Created Cardinal priest by Pope Innocent XI in the Consistory of 2 September 1686, he became commendatory abbot of Malignano (Cremona). Transferred from Titular to Ordinary Archbishop to the See of Carpentras, he became Count of the Comtat Venaissin, with the personal title of Archbishop, on 10 November 1687.

He did not take part in the 1689 papal conclave that elected Pope Alexander VIII, only receiving the Cardinal purple and the Titular church of Santa Prisca later, on 14 November 1689. Transferred again to the Archdiocese of Ferrara-Comacchio from 27 November 1690, he also retained the personal title of Archbishop. He took part in the 1691 papal conclave that elected Pope Innocent XII as pontiff and was then transferred with his pastoral duties to the Archdiocese of Spoleto-Norcia from 27 August 1691, always with the personal title of Archbishop.

Appointed Legate to Bologna from 28 September 1693, he resigned from the regency of the Diocese of Spoleto on 7 February 1695 and transferred to the Diocese of Faenza-Modigliana from 11 November 1697, always retaining the title of Archbishop.

After participating in the 1700 papal conclave that elected Pope Clement XI as pontiff, he opted for the Titular church of San Pietro in Vincoli on 21 February 1701, later becoming Legate in Romagna on 6 June 1701, remaining in office until 1706.

Marcello Durazzo died on 27 April 1710, at 5:00 p.m., in his episcopal palace in Faenza, while his body was then exposed for public veneration and buried in the city cathedral.

== Sources ==
- Entry on Cardinal Marcello Durazzo in Treccani
- Entry on Cardinal Marcello Durazzo catholic-hierarchy
- Entry on Cardinal Marcello Durazzo in fiu.edu.
