= Chronicon Faventinum =

The Chronicon Faventinum is a Latin chronicle of the city of Faenza and the region of Emilia-Romagna from 20 BC until AD 1236. It was begun by a Faentine native, Tolosanus, a deacon, magister and later secular canon of Faenza Cathedral. He brought the record down to 1218. The chronicle was subsequently continued for a decade by at least two other anonymous writers, probably canons of the cathedral.

Tolosanus was born in the mid-12th century. He was a rhetorician active in municipal politics and in the local church. He had a biblical and classical education, an understanding of juridical procedure and good Latinity. He died on 5 April 1226.

The Chronicon is the earliest piece of urban historiography from Emilia-Romagna. it is divided into 153 chapters, each headed by a rubric. It begins with the mythical founding of the city by the Romans, which Tolosanus dates to 20 BC. Tolosanus quotes extensively from Virgil and the bible. His work is largely legendary until the period of the communes (11–12th century). While for the earlier period, his chronology is based on the succession of bishops of Faenza, for the communal period it is based on the succession of magistrates.

Ideologically, the Chronicon has Guelph (i.e., pro-papal) sympathies. The solidarity of the commune, the clergy and the bishop is stressed. Tolosanus was imbued with a crusading spirit and he glorifies the urban militia. Imola, Forlì and Ravenna are portrayed as Faenza's traditional enemies. Faenza was always a member of the Lombard League, and the Chronicon often rises above local history to cover the wider conflict between the league and the Holy Roman Empire. It records how the city sent 27 knights to fight for the pope against the emperor during the War of the Keys (1228–1230).

== Editions ==
- Rossini, G., ed. "Chronicon faventinum". Rerum italicarum scriptores (2nd ed.), Vol. 28, pt. 1.

== Sources ==
- Hartmann, Florian (2016). "Tolosanus". In Graeme Dunphy; Cristian Bratu (eds.). Encyclopedia of the Medieval Chronicle. Brill Online. doi:10.1163/2213-2139_emc_SIM_02440.
- Mascanzoni, Leardo (1996). Il Tolosano e i suoi continuatori: nuovi elementi per uno studio della composizione del Chronicon faventinum. Rome.
- Mascanzoni, Leardo (2019). "Tolosano". Dizionario Biografico degli Italiani (in Italian). Vol. 96: Toja–Trivelli. Rome: Institute of the Italian Encyclopaedia. ISBN 978-88-12-00032-6.
- Raccagni, Gianluca (2016). "The Crusade Against Frederick II: A Neglected Piece of Evidence" (PDF). The Journal of Ecclesiastical History. 67 (4): 721–740. doi:10.1017/S002204691600066X.
- Tanzini, Lorenzo (2016). "De origine civitatis: The Building of Civic Identity in Italian Communal Chronicles (12th–14th Century)". Imago Temporis: Medium Aevum. 10: 171–189.
- Vasina, Augusto (2003). "Medieval Urban Historiography in Western Europe (1100–1500)". In Deborah Mauskopf Deliyannis (ed.). Historiography in the Middle Ages. Brill. pp. 317–352.
