= Michele Morandi =

Italian Roman Catholic bishop (born 1976)

The Most Reverend Michele Morandi
- Bishop of Faenza-Modigliana
- Church: Catholic Church
- Diocese: Faenza-Modigliana
- Appointed: 18 April 2026
- Predecessor: Mario Toso
- Previous post: Vicar General of Faenza-Modigliana (2016–2026)

Orders
- Ordination: 18 October 2003 by Benvenuto Castellani
- Consecration: 12 July 2026 by Mario Toso

Personal details
- Born: Michele Morandi; 30 March 1976 (age 50) Alfonsine, Emilia-Romagna, Italy
- Education: Pontifical Regional Major Seminary "Benedetto XV" in Bologna
- Motto: Virtus in infirmitate perficitur
- Coat of arms

Michele Morandi (born 30 March 1976) is an Italian Roman Catholic prelate who has served as Bishop of Faenza-Modigliana since 2026.

== Early life and education ==
Morandi was born on 30 March 1976 in Alfonsine, in the Province of Ravenna, Italy. He entered the Regional Minor Seminary of Bologna before studying at the Pontifical Regional Major Seminary "Benedetto XV" in Bologna, where he obtained a bachelor's degree in theology. He subsequently earned a licentiate in the Theology of Evangelization.

== Priestly ministry ==
Morandi was ordained to the priesthood for the Diocese of Faenza-Modigliana on 18 October 2003.

Following his ordination, he served as vice parish priest and parish administrator in several parishes from 2003 to 2012. Beginning in 2004, he directed the diocesan youth and vocational ministry. He served as vice rector of the diocesan seminary from 2013 to 2015 and was responsible for the preparatory community for the dioceses of Romagna from 2008 to 2024.

In 2015 Morandi became rector of the diocesan seminary, and in 2016 he was appointed vicar general of the Diocese of Faenza-Modigliana. He also served as a cathedral canon and parish administrator in several parishes, particularly assisting communities affected by the 2023 floods and earlier earthquakes.

== Episcopal ministry ==
On 18 April 2026, Pope Leo XIV accepted the resignation of Bishop Mario Toso and appointed Morandi bishop of Faenza-Modigliana.

He received episcopal consecration on 12 July 2026 in the Cathedral of Faenza.
