= Santa Maria in Ara Coeli =

Roman Catholic basilica, a landmark of Rome, Italy

Basilica of Saint Mary of the Altar in Heaven
- Basilica di Santa Maria in Aracœli (Italian); Basilica Sanctae Mariae de Ara Cœli (Latin)
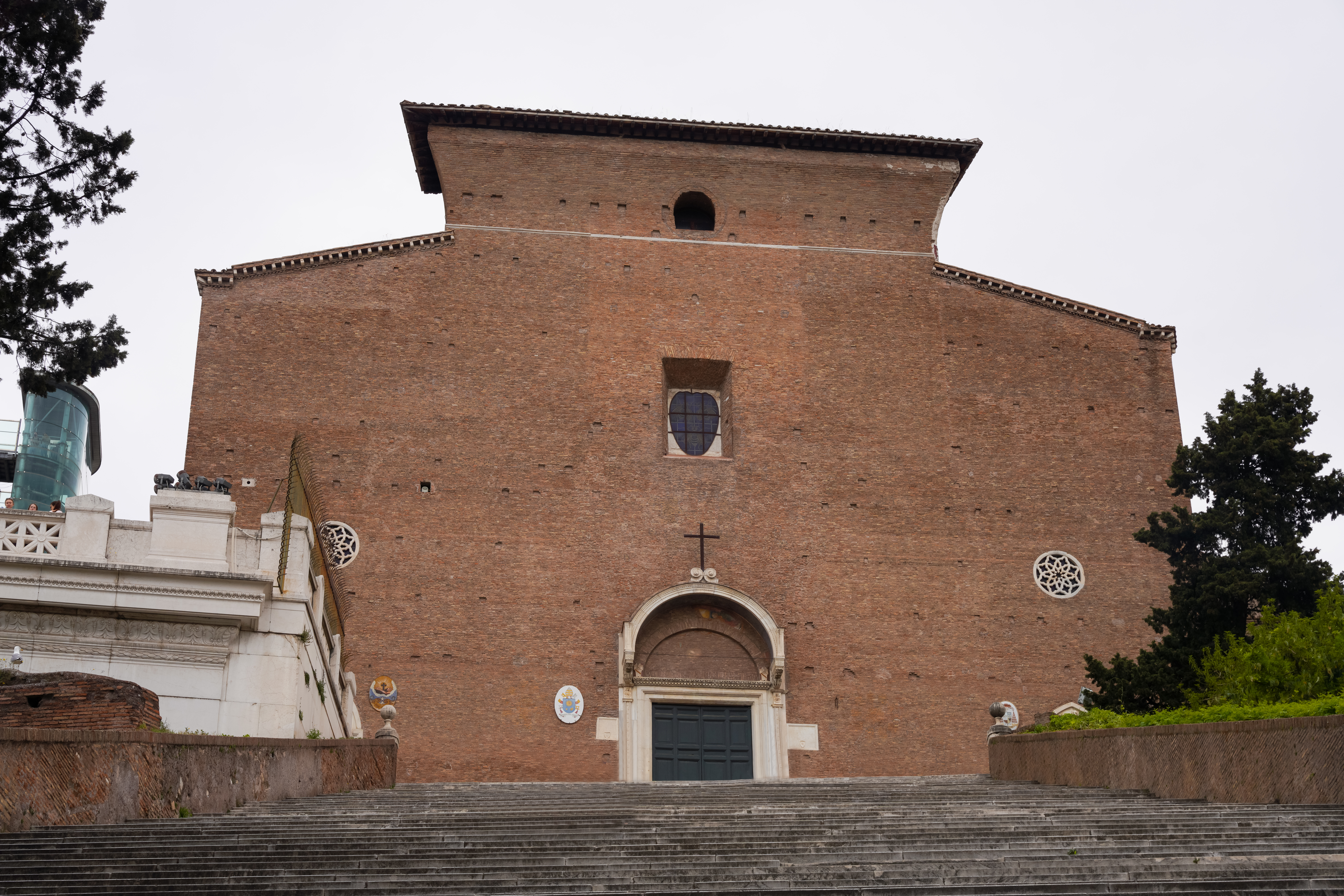
- Façade of the Basilica with the Ara Coeli
- Click on the map for a fullscreen view
- 41°53′38″N 12°29′00″E
- Location: Scala dell'Arce Capitolina 12, Rome
- Country: Italy
- Denomination: Catholic
- Tradition: Latin Church
- Religious order: Franciscan Friars Minor
- Website: Official Website

History
- Status: Minor basilica Titular church Conventual church Regional church
- Founded: 7th century
- Dedication: Mary Queen of Heaven: Brother Juniper

Architecture
- Style: Romanesque, Gothic
- Completed: 12th century

Specifications
- Length: 80 metres (260 ft)
- Width: 45 metres (148 ft)

The Basilica of Saint Mary of the Altar in Heaven (Latin: Basilica Sanctæ Mariæ de Ara Cœli in Capitolio, Italian: Basilica di Santa Maria in Ara Cœli al Campidoglio) is a titular basilica and conventual church of the Franciscan Convent of Aracoeli located on the highest summit of the Capitoline Hill in Rome, Italy. From 1250 to 1798 it was the headquarters of the General Curia of the Order of Friars Minor as well as being one of the city's principal civic churches. It is still the designated church of the city council of Rome, which uses the ancient title of Senatus Populusque Romanus. The present cardinal priest of the Titulus Sanctæ Mariæ de Aracœli is Salvatore De Giorgi.

The shrine is known for housing relics belonging to Helena, mother of Emperor Constantine, various minor relics from the Holy Sepulchre, both the pontifically crowned images of Nostra Signora di Mano di Oro di Aracœli (1636) on the high altar and the Santo Bambino of Aracoeli (1897). It is also famous for the exquisite Pinturicchio frescos in the Bufalini Chapel on the right hand side of the west doors.

== History ==
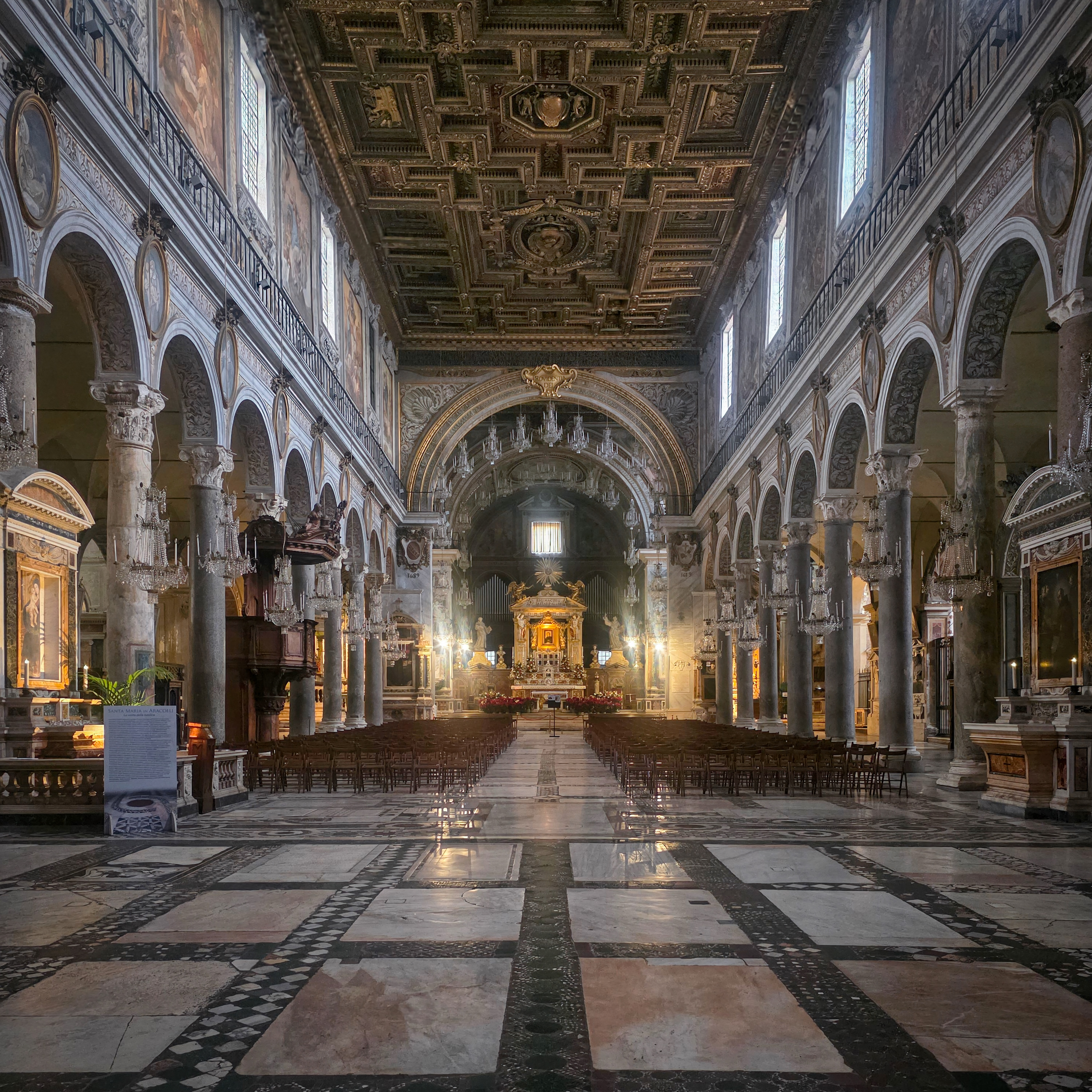
Interior of the church

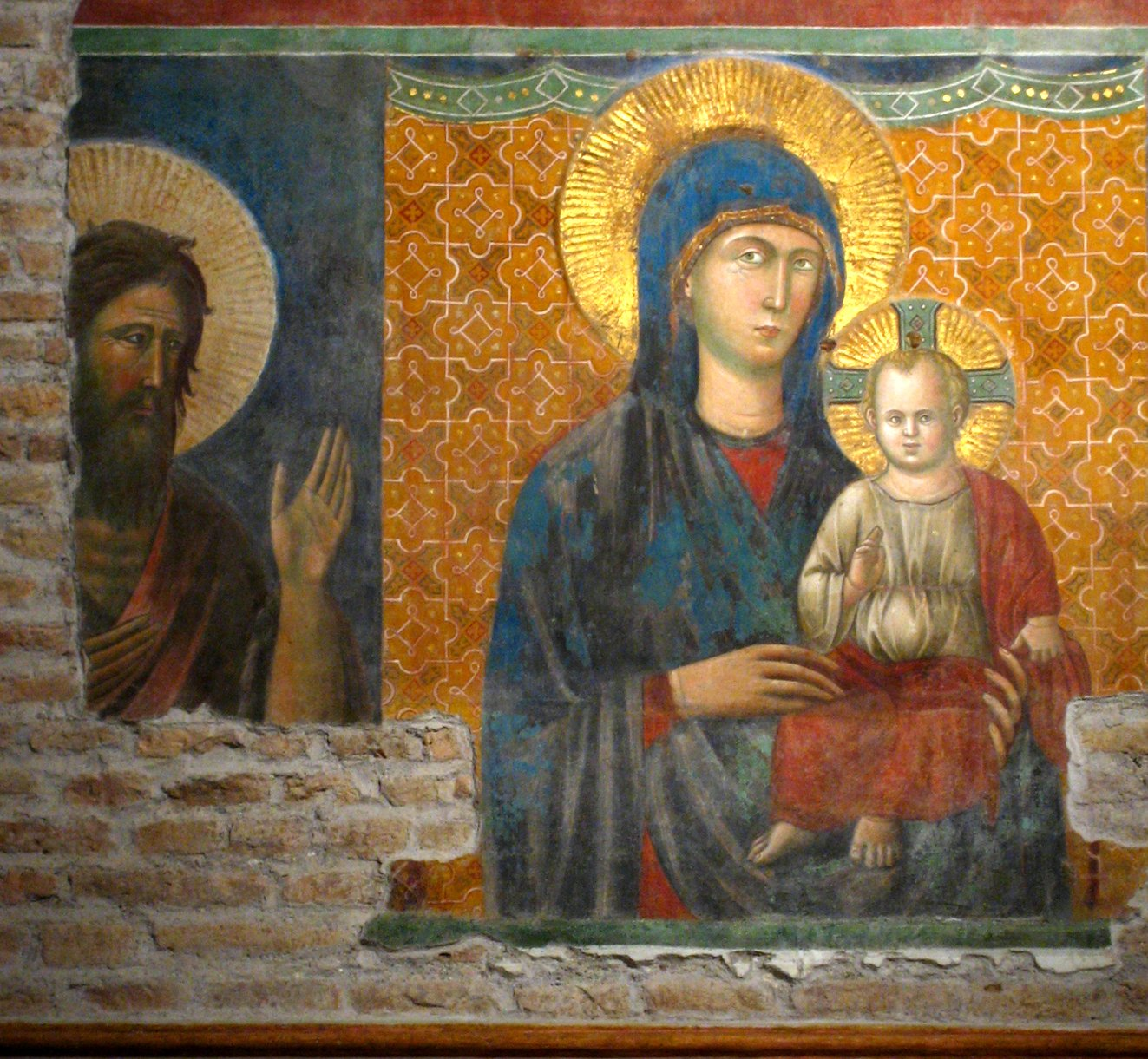
Fresco of Madonna and the Child by Pietro Cavallini

The church stands on the Arx, the northern of the two peaks of the Capitoline hill, at an elevation of c. 48 m above sea level. In antiquity, this was the site of the Temple of Juno Moneta, but no remains of the temple have been certainly identified, and its precise location is a subject of debate. The ancient walls discovered in the cellars beneath the church appear to belong chiefly to shops and houses, and some scholars have argued that temple itself was situated in the garden to the southeast of the church, where other walls of tufa and concrete are visible.

The foundation of the church was laid on the site of a Byzantine abbey mentioned in 574. Many buildings were built around the first church; in the upper part they gave rise to a cloister, while on the slopes of the hill a little quarter and a market grew up. Remains of these buildings - such as the little church of San Biagio de Mercato and the underlying "Insula Romana") - were discovered in the 1930s. At first the church followed the Greek rite, a sign of the power of the Byzantine exarch. Taken over by the papacy by the 9th century, the church was given first to the Benedictines, then, by papal bull to the Franciscans in 1249–1250; under the Franciscans it received its Romanesque-Gothic aspect. The arches that divide the nave from the aisles are supported on columns, no two precisely alike, scavenged from Roman ruins.

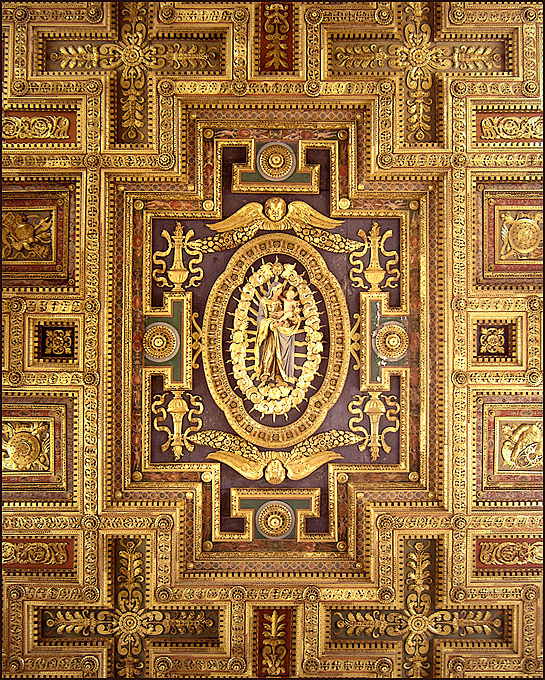
Ceiling

Originally the church was named Sancta Maria in Capitolio, since it was sited on the Capitoline Hill (Campidoglio, in Italian) of Ancient Rome; by the 14th century it had been renamed. A medieval legend included in the mid-12th-century guide to Rome, Mirabilia Urbis Romae, claimed that the church was built over an Augustan Ara primogeniti Dei, in the place where the Tiburtine Sibyl prophesied to Augustus the coming of the Christ. "For this reason the figures of Augustus and of the Tiburtine sibyl are painted on either side of the arch above the high altar". Its name originates from a legend according to which a sibyl predicted the coming of the son of God to Augustus by saying: "Haec est ara Filii Dei" (This is the altar of the son of God): hence the name Ara Coeli.

During the Middle Ages, this church became the centre of the religious and civil life of the city. It was here in 1341 that Petrarch was proclaimed Poet laureate. During the republican experience of the 14th century, when self-proclaimed Tribune and reviver of the Roman Republic Cola di Rienzo inaugurated the monumental stairway of 124 steps in front of the church, designed in 1348 by Simone Andreozzi, on the occasion of the Black Death. Condemned criminals were executed at the foot of the steps; there Cola di Rienzo met his death, near the spot where his statue commemorates him.

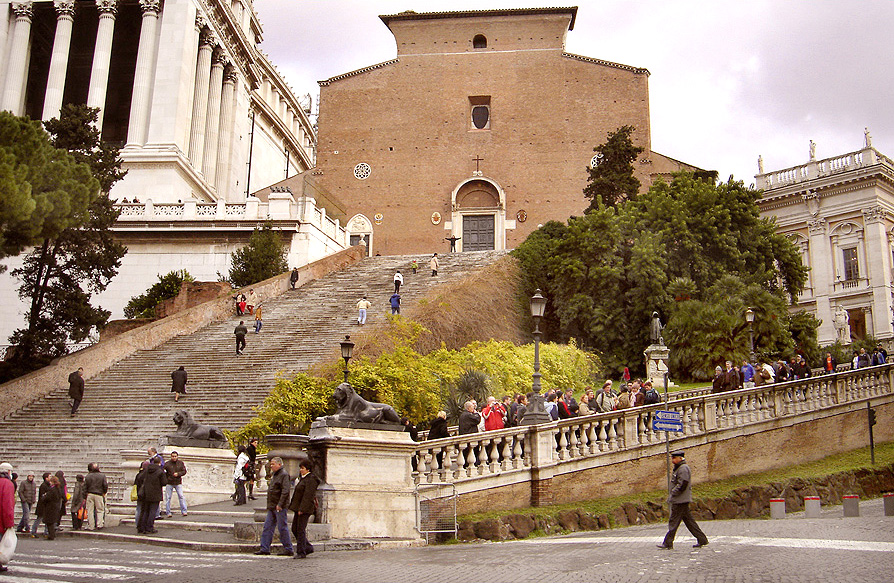
Basilica of Santa Maria in Ara Coeli. The Vittoriano can be seen on the left.

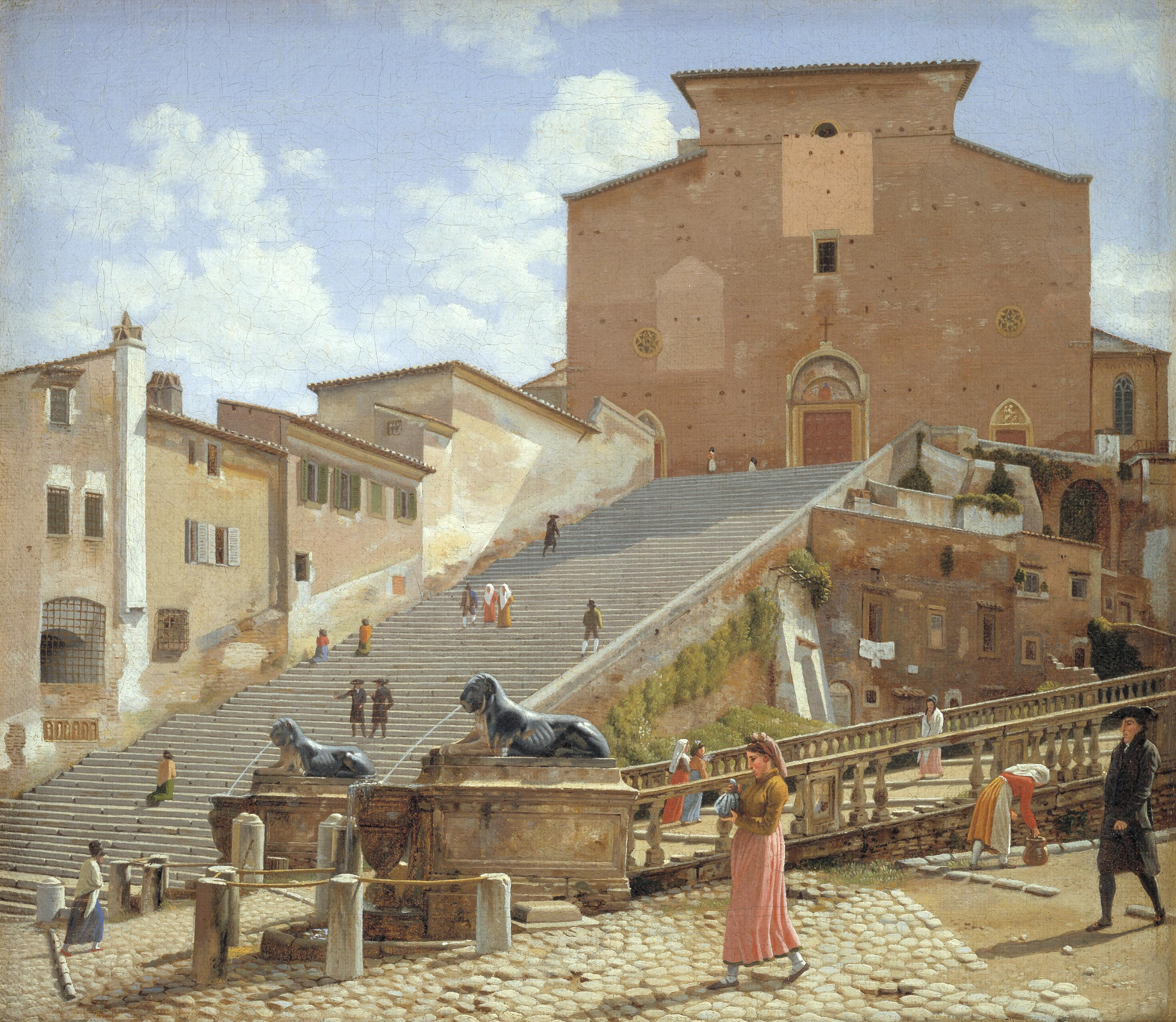
Same view as above in 1816

In 1571, Santa Maria in Aracoeli hosted the celebrations honoring Marcantonio Colonna after the victorious Battle of Lepanto over the Turkish fleet. Marking this occasion, the compartmented ceiling was gilded and painted (finished 1575), to thank the Blessed Virgin for the victory. In 1797, during the French occupation and the Roman Republic, the basilica was deconsecrated and turned into a stable. It was almost demolished in the 1880s during the construction of the nearby Vittoriano.

== Exterior ==
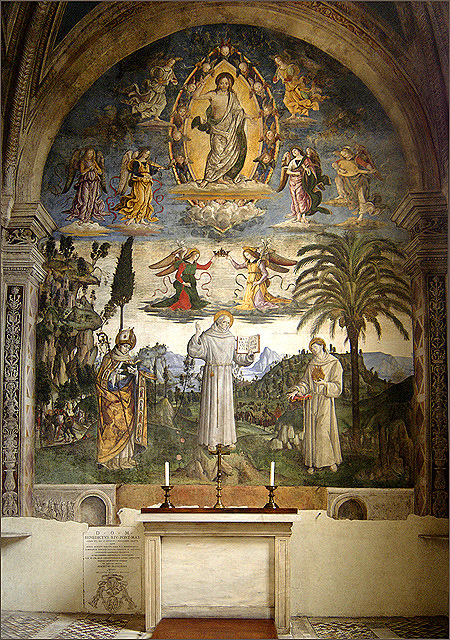
Central fresco by Pinturicchio in the Bufalini Chapel (1486)

The original unfinished façade lost the mosaics and subsequent frescoes that originally decorated it, save a mosaic in the tympanum of the main door, one of three doors that were later additions. The gothic window is the primary detail that tourists observe from the bottom of the stairs; it is the only authentically Gothic detail of the basilica.

== Interior ==
The basilica is built as a nave and two aisles that are divided by Roman columns, which were taken from diverse antique monuments and are all different. Among its numerous treasures are Pinturicchio's 15th-century frescoes depicting the life of Saint Bernardino of Siena in the Bufalini Chapel, the first chapel on the right. Other features are the wooden ceiling, the inlaid cosmatesque floor, a Transfiguration painted on wood by Girolamo Siciolante da Sermoneta, and works by other artists like Pietro Cavallini (of his frescoes only one survives), Benozzo Gozzoli, and Giulio Romano.

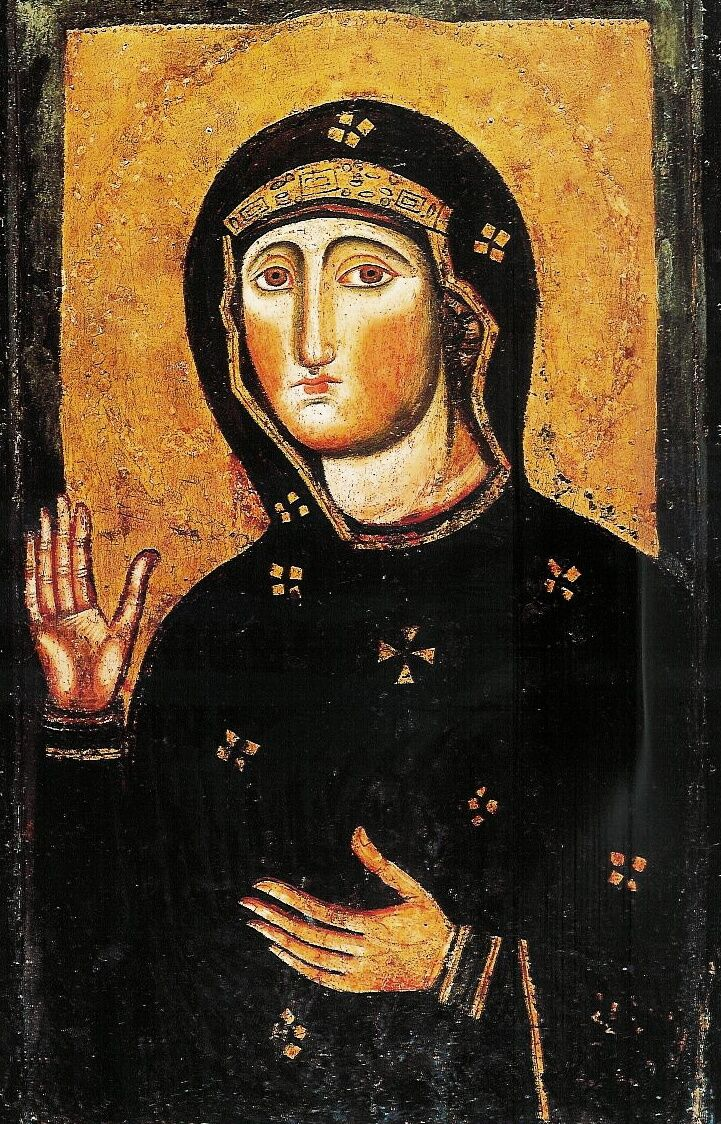
Madonna Aracoeli, the primary icon of the basilica

It also houses the Madonna Aracoeli (Our Lady of the Golden Hands), a Byzantine icon of the 10-11th century, in the altar. This Marian image was Pontifically crowned on 29 March 1636 by Pope Urban VIII. Pope Pius XII consecrated the people of Rome to the Most Blessed Virgin Mary and her Immaculate Heart in front of this image on 30 May 1948. In the transept there is a sepulchral monument by Arnolfo di Cambio.

The church was also famous in Rome for the wooden statue of the Santo Bambino of Aracoeli, carved in the 15th century of olive wood from the Garden of Gethsemane and covered with valuable ex-votos. Many Romans believed in the spiritual efficacy of devotion to this statue. The French took the statue in 1797, it was then recovered, and then stolen again in February 1994. A copy was made from wood from Gethsemane, which copy is presently displayed in its own chapel near the sacristy. At midnight Mass on Christmas Eve the image is brought out to a throne before the high altar and unveiled at the Gloria. Until Epiphany the bejeweled image resides in the Nativity crib in the left nave of the basilica.

The relics of Helena, mother of Constantine the Great, are housed in the basilica, as is the tablet with the monogram of Jesus that Bernardino of Siena used to promote devotion to the Holy Name of Jesus.

== Burials ==
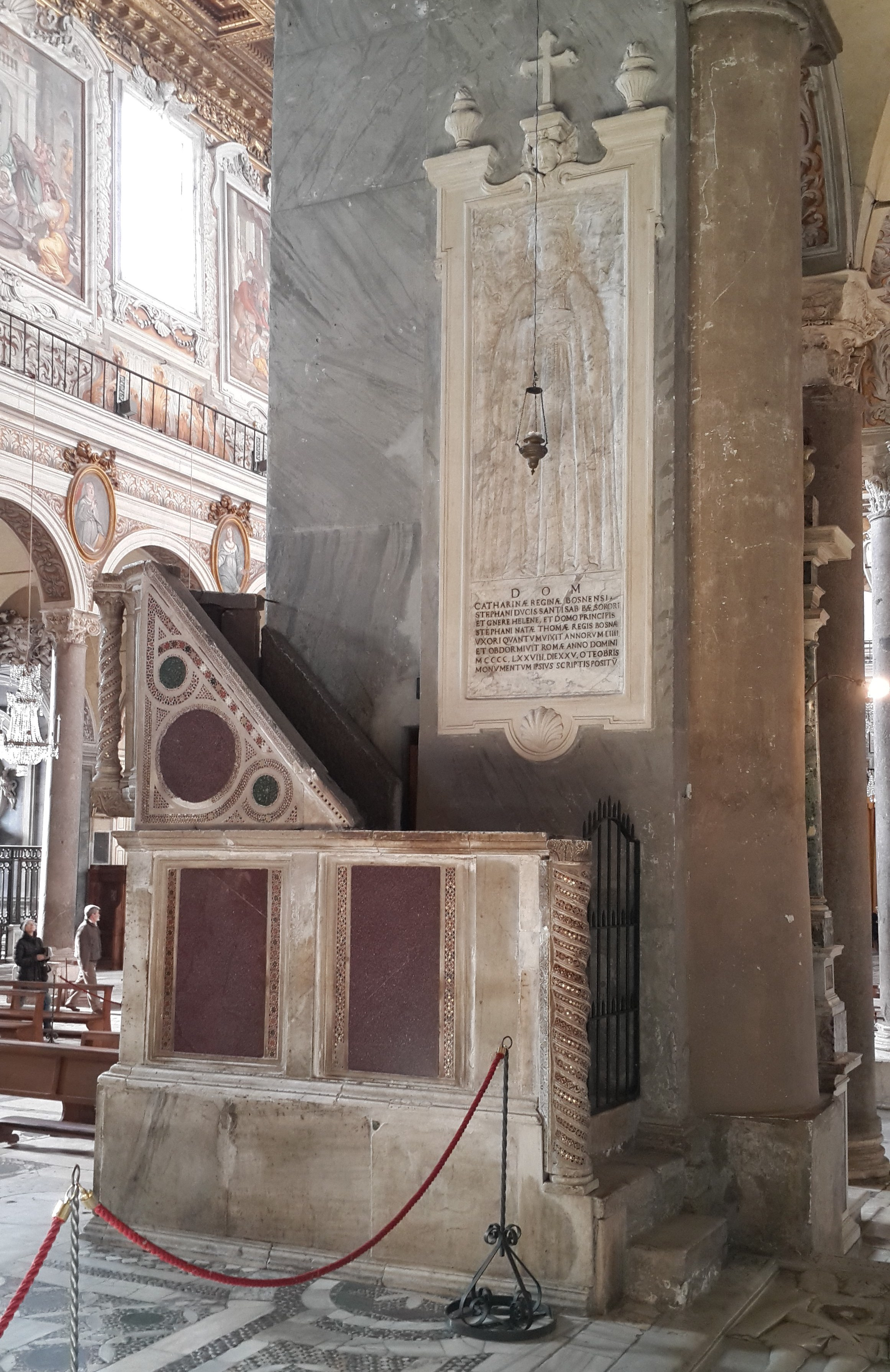
The ledger stone of Queen Catherine of Bosnia

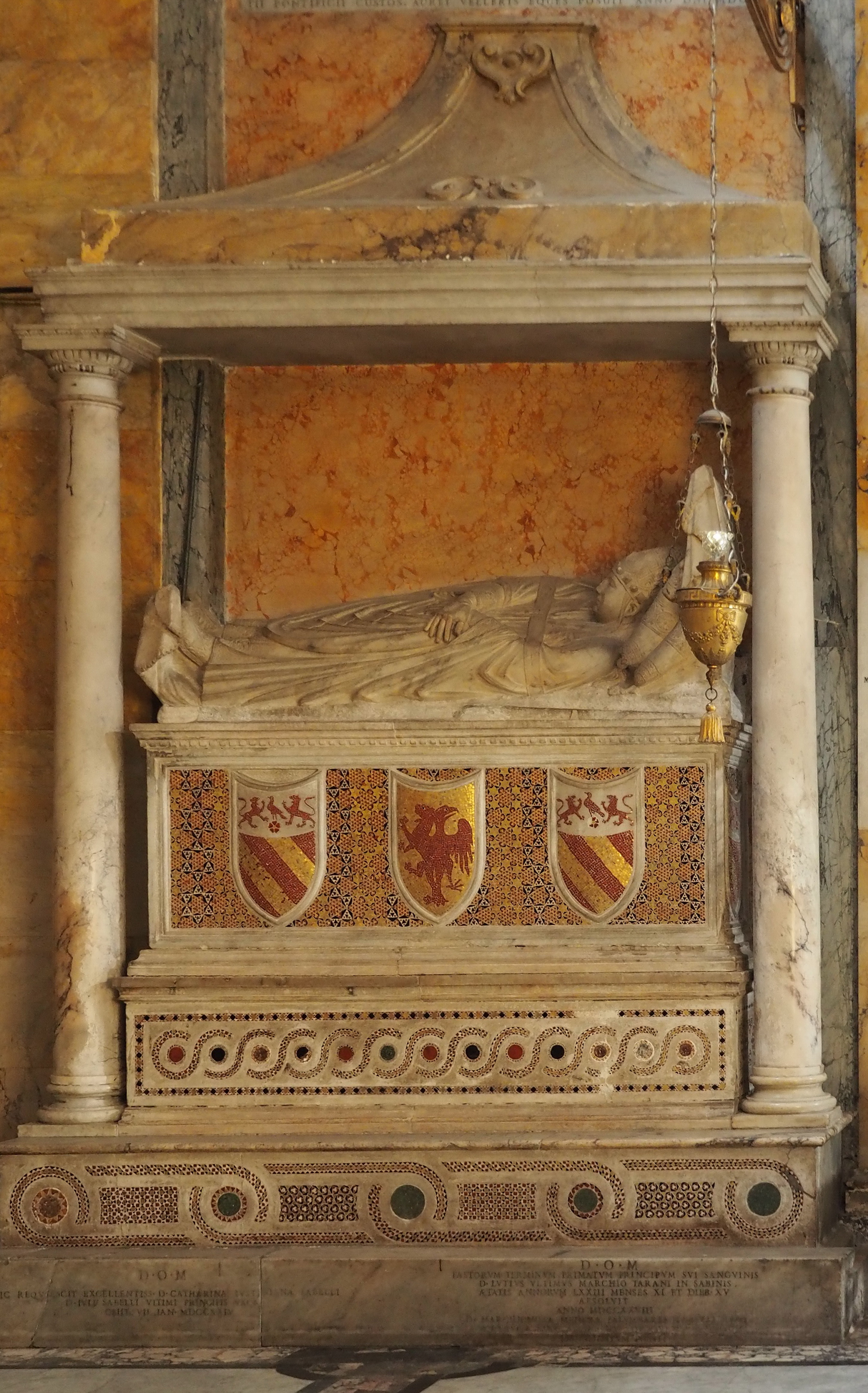
The tomb of Honorius IV

- Catherine of Bosnia, Bosnian Queen
- Pope Honorius IV, son of Luca Savelli
- Brother Juniper, one of the original followers of Saint Francis of Assisi
- Giulio Salvadori, the poet
- Luca Savelli, right transept, left side
- Giovanna Aldobransdeschi dei Conti di Santa Fiora, wife of Luca Savelli, right transept, right side
- Cardinal Matteo d'Acquasparta
- Carlo Crivelli, Archdeacon of Acquilea, sculpted by Donatello
- Cardinal Louis d'Albret (Lodovico Lebretto)
- Fillipo Della Valle, fifth chapel on left
- Cardinal Giovanni Battista Savelli
- Cardinal Pietro di Vicenti, passage to side door
- Pietro Della Valle, Italian traveler, and Sitti Maani, his wife from Baghdad
- Federico di Sanseverino Cardinal (d. 1516)

== List of Cardinal-Priests ==
- Cristoforo Numai OFMObs (1517–1527)
- Title suspended (1527–1544)
- Francisco Mendoza de Bobadilla (1545–1550)
- Giovanni Michele Saraceni (1551–1557)
- Clemente d'Olera OFMObs (1557–1568)
- Alessandro Crivelli (1570–1574)
- Alessandro Riario (1578–1585)
- Giovanni Battista Castrucci (1586–1592)
- Francesco Maria Bourbon del Monte (1592–1611)
- Agostino Galamini OP (1611–1639)
- Ascanio Filomarino (1642–1666)
- Carlo Roberti de' Vittori (1667–1673)
- Giacomo Franzoni (1673–1685)
- Giacomo de Angelis (1686–1695)
- Giovanni Francesco Negroni (1696–1713)
- Giovanni Battista Bussi (1713–1726)
- Lorenzo Cozza OFMObs (1727–1729)
- Alamanno Salviati (1730–1733)
- Marcello Passari (1733–1741)
- Carlo Leopoldo Calcagnini (1743–1746)
- Carlo Rezzonico (1747–1755), later Pope Clemens XIII.
- Luigi Mattei (1756–1758)
- Johann Theodor von Bayern (1759–1761)
- Baldassare Cenci (1762–1763)
- Niccolò Oddi (1766–1767)
- Vitaliano Borromeo (1768–1783)
- Innocenzo Conti (1783–1785)
- Alessandro Mattei (1786–1800)
- Francesco Maria Locatelli (1803–1811)
- vacant (1811–1816)
- Giovanni Battista Quarantotti (1816–1820)
- Fabrizio Turriozzi (1823–1826)
- Giacomo Filippo Fransoni (1828–1855)
- Francesco Gaude OP (1855–1857)
- Giuseppe Milesi Pironi Ferretti (1858–1870)
- vacant (1870–1874)
- Maximilian Joseph von Tarnóczy (1874–1876)
- Mieczyslaw Halka Ledóchowski (1876–1896)
- Francesco Satolli (1896–1903)
- Beniamino Cavicchioni (1903–1911)
- Diomede Falconio OFM (1911–1914)
- Basilio Pompili (1914–1917)
- Filippo Camassei (1919–1921)
- Juan Benlloch y Vivó (1921–1926)
- Jozef-Ernest van Roey (1927–1961)
- Juan Landázuri Ricketts OFM (1962–1997)
- Salvatore De Giorgi (since 1998)

== Curiosities ==
- The church also contains the marble tomb of Cecchino Bracci, pupil of artist Michelangelo who had dedicated a number of poems in his name. The tomb's design (not the carving) is by Michelangelo.
- A part of the last mission of the video game Assassin's Creed: Brotherhood takes place in this basilica, which the Assassins discover has been built on top of an ancient Isu temple.
- In this church, football player Francesco Totti and Ilary Blasi celebrated their marriage in 2005, followed by thousands of fans.
- It was this church where Edward Gibbon was struck with the idea to write his Decline and Fall of the Roman Empire. "It was at Rome, on the 15th of October 1764," he wrote in his "Autobiography", "as I sat musing amid the ruins of the capitol, while the bare-footed friars were singing vespers in the temple of Jupiter [Gibbon was mistaken; this church was actually the former Temple of Juno Moneta], that the idea of writing the decline and fall of the city first started to my mind.”

== See also ==
- Churches of Rome

== Bibliography ==
- Johanna Elfriede Louise Heideman, The cinquecento chapel decorations in S. Maria in Aracoeli in Rome, Academische Pers, 1982.

Preceded by Santa Maria in Domnica	Landmarks of Rome; Santa Maria in Ara Coeli	Succeeded by Santa Maria del Popolo
