= Cecchino dei Bracci =

Italian sculptor

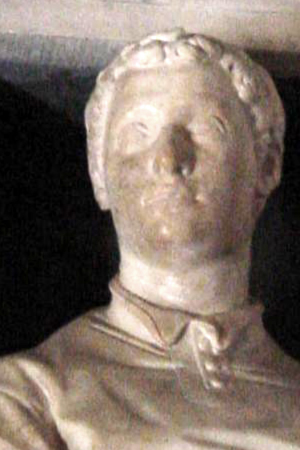
Cecchino Bracci.

Cecchino Bracci (real name Francesco de Zanobi Bracci) (Florence, 23 April 1528 – Rome, 8 January 1544) was a pupil of Michelangelo. He died at the age of fifteen and is buried in Santa Maria in Aracoeli, in a tomb designed by Michelangelo.

== Life and legacy ==
Cecchino was born in Florence on 23 April 1528 to Zanobi Bracci, a wealthy banker. The Bracci dynasty had moved to Florence in 1395 from the smaller town of Vinci. In the 16th century, they were among the richest of the Florentine banking families, and friends of the Medici. They acquired Palazzo Neroni in via de' Ginori as their base, along with a chapel in Santa Maria Novella.

Around 1540, Cecchino accompanied his uncle, Luigi del Riccio, to Rome, where he had links with the Strozzi banking family. Cecchino's beauty and manners made him welcome at the papal court. During his stay, he met some of the major Florentine artists working in the city, including Michelangelo in 1542.

He died on 8 January 1544, and his devastated uncle begged Michelangelo to design the tomb and write some verses as an epitaph. On 12 January, del Riccio wrote to his friend Donato Gionnoti, at Vicenza: "Alas, my friend Donato! Our Cecchino is dead. All Rome weeps. Michelangelo is making for me the design of a decent sepulture in marble; and I pray you to write me the epitaph, and to send it to me with a consolatory letter, if time permits, for my grief has distraught me. Patience! I live with a thousand and a thousand deaths each hour. O God! How has Fortune changed her aspect!"

Michelangelo composed more than forty-two epigrams of four lines each.

Cecchino was buried in the church of Santa Maria in Aracoeli in Rome.

== References in Michelangelo's poetry ==
Bracci is seen in Michelangelo's poem G.193 where he laments that he did not get to know him for long enough. He states:

Scarce had I seen for the first time his eyes
Which to your living eyes were life and light,
When closed at last in death's injurious night
He opened them on God in Paradise.

== The tomb ==
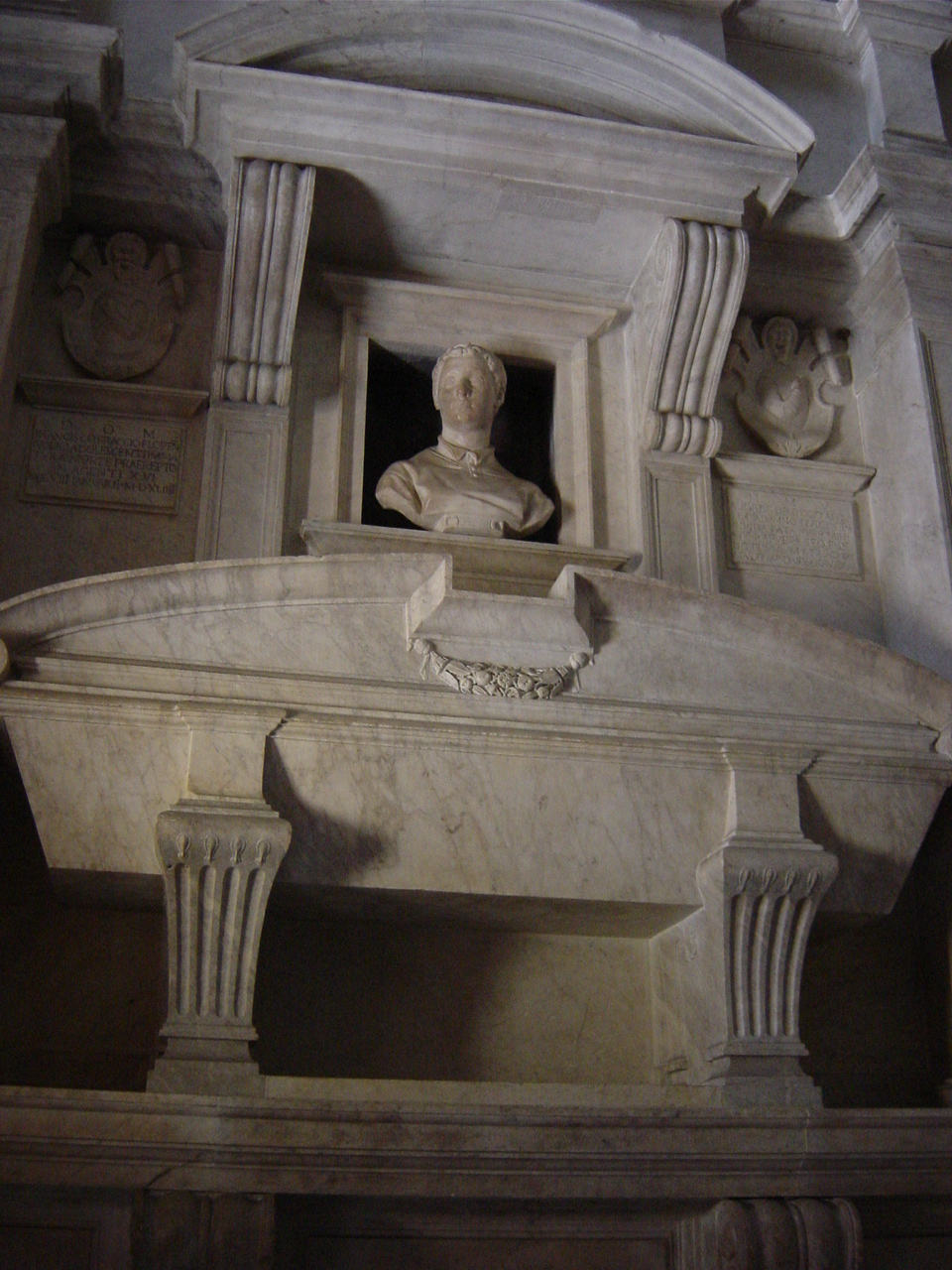

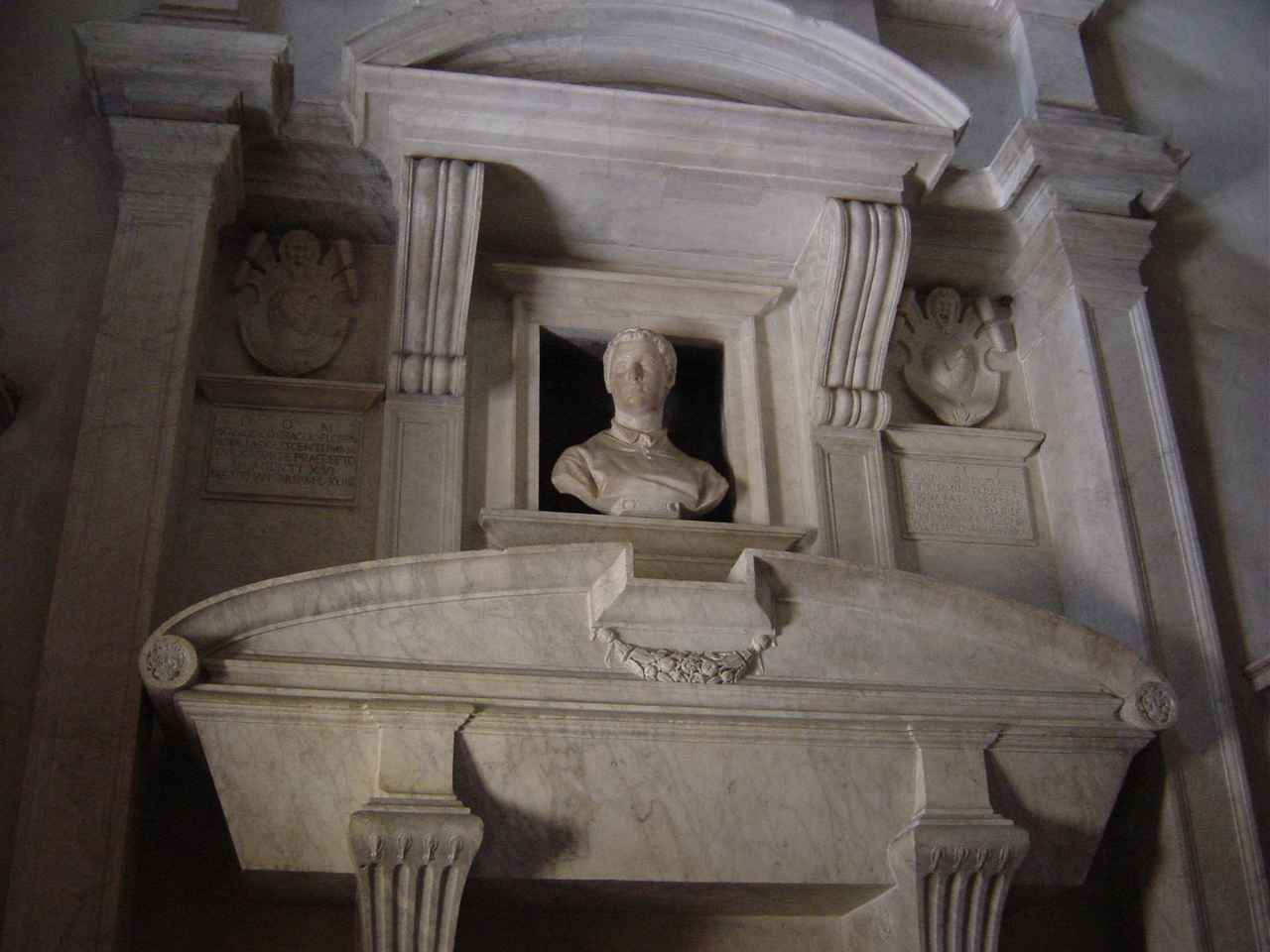

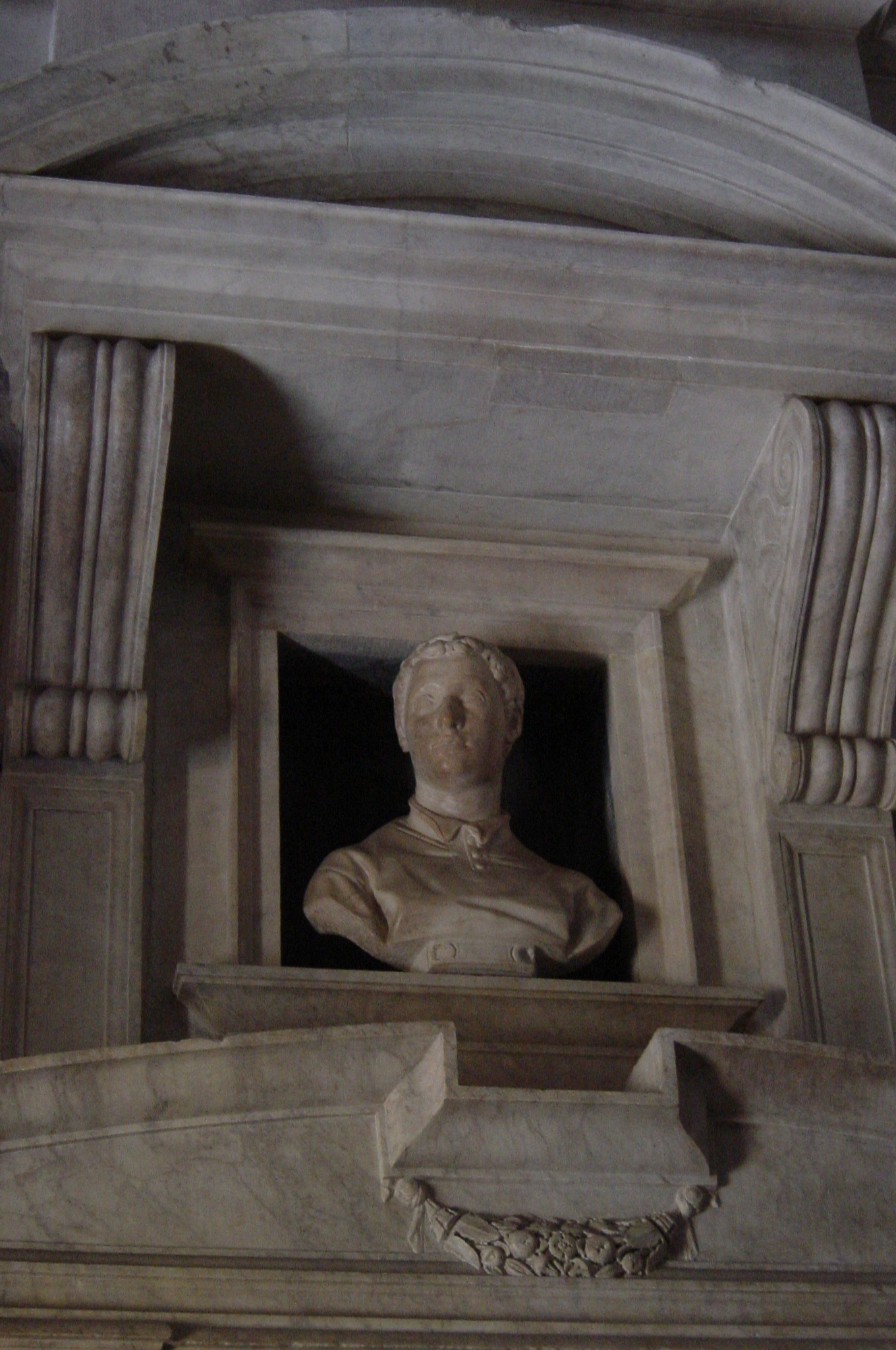
