= Giulio Piazza =

Italian Catholic cardinal

His Eminence Giulio Piazza
- Bishop of Faenza
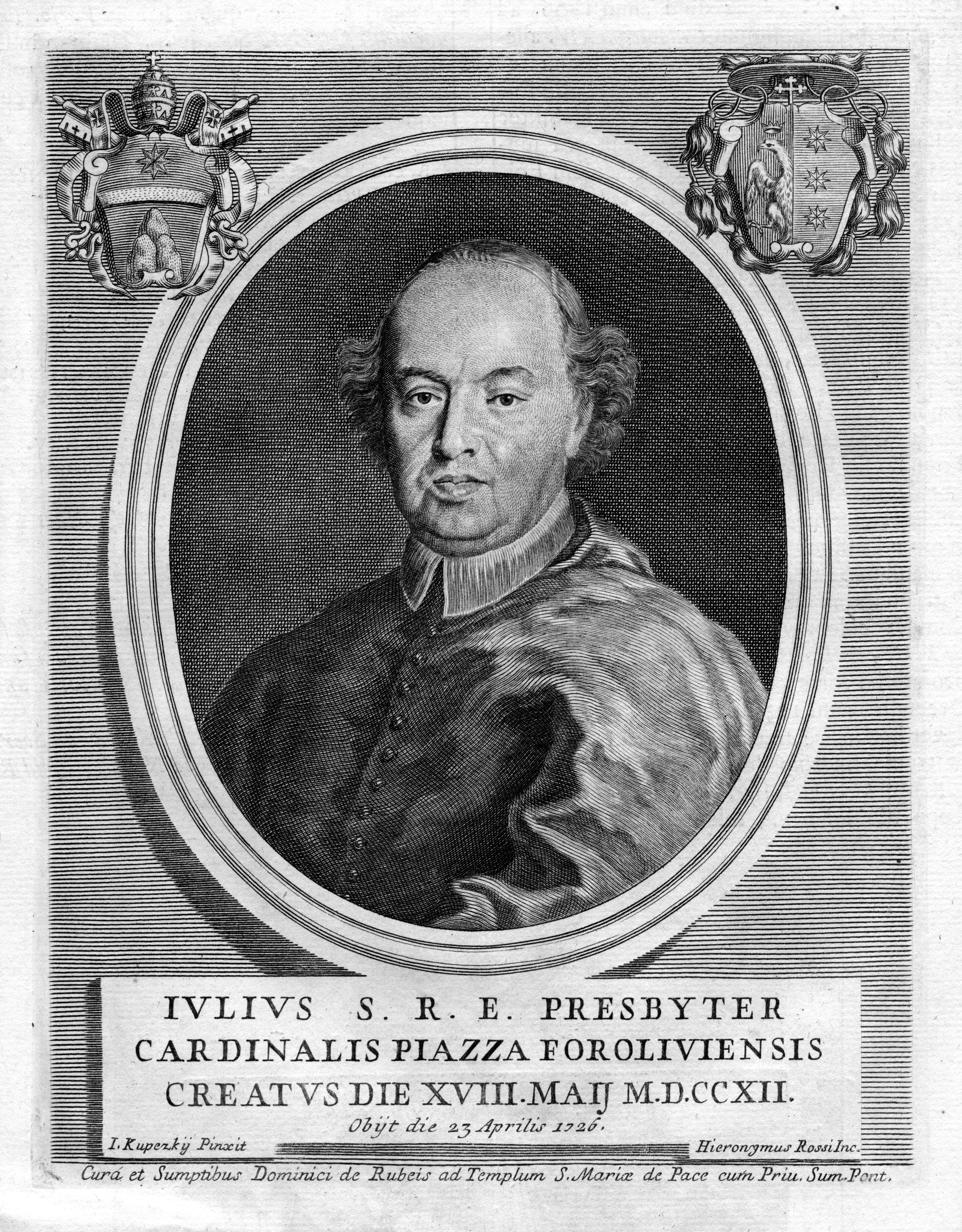
- Portrait.
- Church: Catholic Church
- Archdiocese: Ravenna
- Diocese: Faenza
- See: Faenza
- Appointed: 21 July 1710
- Term ended: 23 April 1726
- Predecessor: Marcello Durazzo
- Successor: Tommaso Cervioni da Montalcino
- Other post: Cardinal-Priest of San Lorenzo in Panisperna (1714–1726)
- Previous posts: Titular Archbishop of Rhodes (1697–1706); Apostolic Nuncio to Switzerland (1698–1702); Apostolic Nuncio to Cologne (1702–06); Apostolic Nuncio to Poland (1706–09); Archbishop of Nazareth in Barletta (1706–10); Bishop of Canne (1706–10); Bishop of Monteverde (1706–10); Apostolic Nuncio to Austria-Hungary (1709–12)

Orders
- Consecration: 22 December 1697 by Gasparo Carpegna
- Created cardinal: 18 May 1712 by Pope Clement XI
- Rank: Cardinal-Priest

Personal details
- Born: Giulio Piazza; 13 March 1663 Forlì, Papal States
- Died: 23 April 1726 (age 63) Faenza, Papal States
- Parents: Francesco Piazza; Francesca Savorelli
- Education: Collegio Clementino

Giulio Piazza (1663–1726) was a Roman Catholic cardinal.

== Biography ==
On 22 Dec 1697, he was consecrated bishop by Gasparo Carpegna, Cardinal-Priest of Santa Maria in Trastevere, with Gregorio Giuseppe Gaetani de Aragonia, Titular Patriarch of Alexandria, and Antonio Spinelli, Bishop of Melfi e Rapolla, serving as co-consecrators.

== Episcopal succession ==
Episcopal succession of Giulio Piazza
While bishop, he was the principal consecrator of:<CathHierGiuPia/>
- Franz Joseph Supersaxo, Bishop of Sion (1702);
- Johannes Werner von Veyder, Titular Bishop of Eleutheropolis in Macedonia and Auxiliary Bishop of Cologne (1704);
- Wilhelm von Leslie, Titular Bishop of Abdera and Coadjutor Bishop of Trieste (1712);
- Adamus Benedictus Ratkaj (Ádám Ratkay), Bishop of Senj (1713);
- Francesco Bentini, Bishop of Comacchio (1714);

and the principal co-consecrator of:<CathHierGiuPia/>

- Giovanni Battista Bussi, Titular Archbishop of Tarsus (1706).

Catholic Church titles
Preceded by Gianantonio Davia	Apostolic Internuncio to Belgium; 1690–1696	Succeeded by Orazio Filippo Spada
Preceded by Giorgio Cornaro	Titular Archbishop of Rhodus; 1697–1706	Succeeded by Alessandro Aldobrandini
Preceded by Michelangelo dei Conti	Apostolic Nuncio to Switzerland; 1698–1703	Succeeded by Vincenzo Bichi
Preceded by Bernardino Guinigi	Apostolic Nuncio to Cologne; 1703–1706	Succeeded by Giovanni Battista Bussi
Preceded by Orazio Filippo Spada	Apostolic Nuncio to Poland; 1706–1707	Succeeded by Nicola Gaetano Spinola
Preceded by Domenico Folgori	Titular Archbishop of Nazareth; 1706–1710	Succeeded by Girolamo Mattei (archbishop)
Preceded by Gianantonio Davia	Apostolic Nuncio to Emperor; 1709–1713	Succeeded by Giorgio Spinola
Preceded by Marcello Durazzo	Archbishop (Personal Title) of Faenza; 1710–1726	Succeeded by Tommaso Cervioni
Preceded by Tommaso Ruffo	Cardinal-Priest of San Lorenzo in Panisperna; 1714–1726	Succeeded by Lorenzo Cozza
