= Pope Stephen I =

Head of the Catholic Church from 254 to 257

Pope Saint Stephen I
- Bishop of Rome
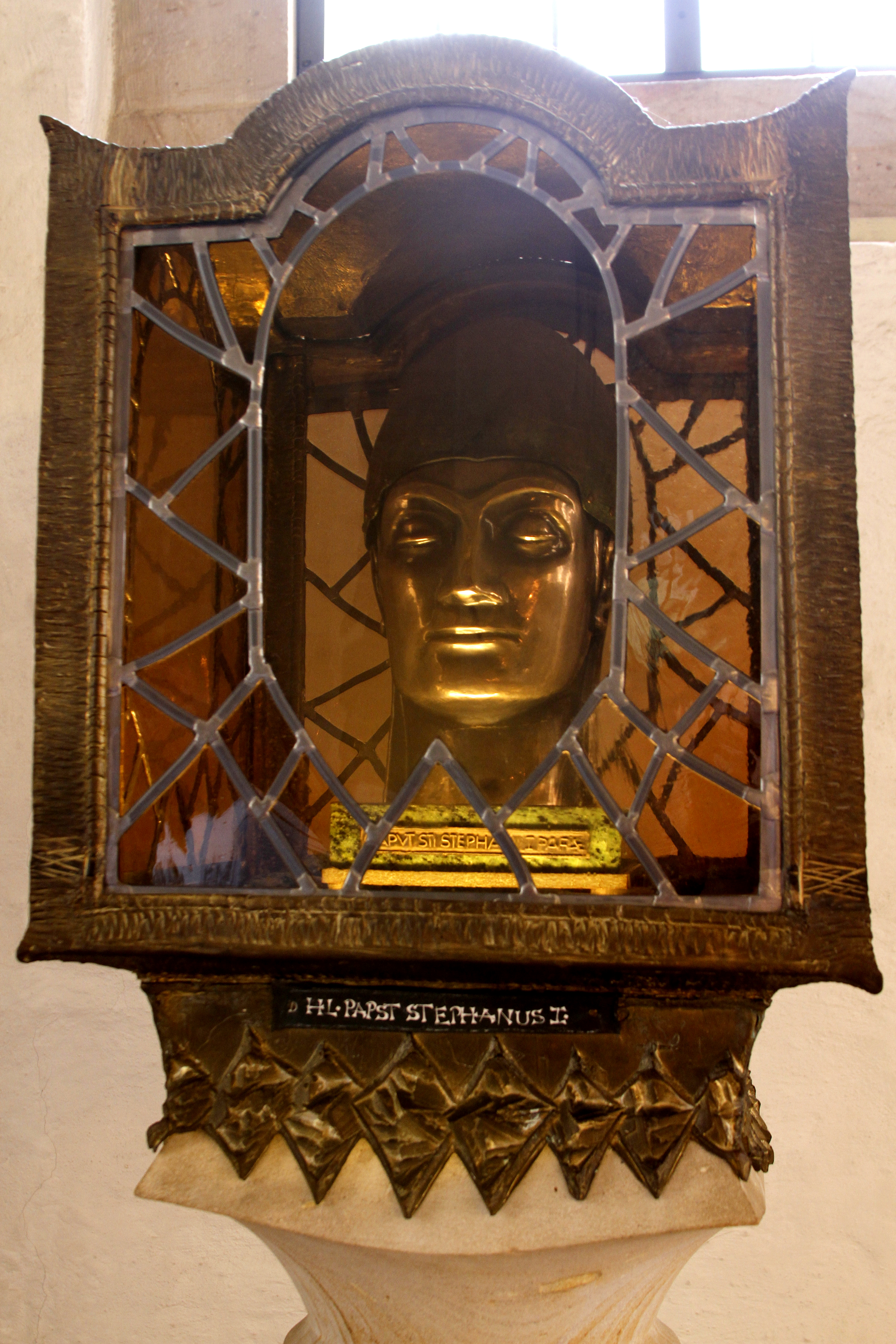
- Relic containing the head of Pope Stephen I, Speyer Cathedral, Germany
- Church: Catholic Church
- Papacy began: 12 May 254
- Papacy ended: 2 August 257
- Predecessor: Lucius I
- Successor: Sixtus II

Personal details
- Born: Rome, Italy, Roman Empire
- Died: 2 August 257 Rome, Italy, Roman Empire

Sainthood
- Feast day: 2 August, 3 August
- Venerated in: Catholic Church; Eastern Orthodox Church
- Patronage: Hvar; Archdiocese of Esztergom-Budapest; Modigliana Cathedral

Pope Stephen I (Greek: Στέφανος Α΄ Latin: Stephanus I; died 2 August 257) was the Bishop of Rome from 12 May 254 to his death on 2 August 257. He was later canonized as a saint and some accounts say he was killed while celebrating Mass.

== Early life ==
Stephen was born in Rome. According to the most ancient lists of popes, he was the son of Jovius and came from a noble Roman family that had long since converted to Christianity. He served as archdeacon of Pope Lucius I, who appointed Stephen his successor.

== Pontificate ==
Following the Decian persecution of 250–251, there was disagreement about how to treat those who had lapsed from the faith. Stephen was urged by Bishop Faustinus of Lyon to take action against Marcian, the Novatianist bishop of Arles, who denied penance and communion to the lapsed who repented. The controversy arose in the context of a broad pastoral problem. During the Decian persecution some Christians had purchased certificates attesting that they had made the requisite sacrifices to the Roman gods. Others had denied they were Christians while yet others had in fact taken part in pagan sacrifices. These people were called in Latin lapsi, the fallen. The question arose as to whether, if they later repented, they could be readmitted to communion with the church, and if so, under what conditions.

Stephen held that converts who had been baptized by schismatics did not need re-baptism, while Cyprian and certain bishops of the Roman province of Africa held rebaptism necessary for admission to the Eucharist. Stephen's view eventually won broad acceptance in the Latin Church. He is also mentioned as having insisted on the restoration of the bishops of León and Astorga, who had been deposed for unfaithfulness during the persecution but afterwards had repented.

== Legacy ==
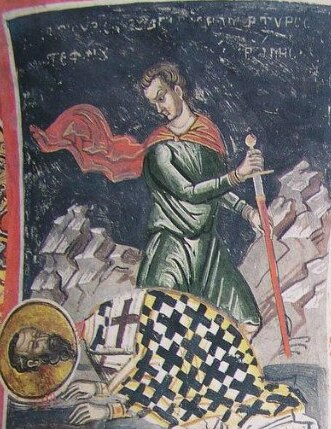
The Martyrdom of Pope Stephen at Dionysiou Monastery (1547)

The Depositio episcoporum of 354 does not speak of Pope Stephen I as a martyr and he is not celebrated as such by the Catholic Church, in spite of the account in the Golden Legend that in 257 Emperor Valerian resumed the persecution of Christians. Stephen was sitting on his pontifical throne celebrating Mass for his congregation when the emperor's men came and beheaded him on 2 August 257. As late as the 18th century, what was said to be the chair was preserved, still allegedly stained with blood.

Stephen I's feast day in the Catholic Church is celebrated on 2 August. In 1839, when the new feast of St Alphonsus Mary de Liguori was assigned to 2 August, Stephen I was mentioned only as a commemoration within the Mass of Saint Alphonsus. The revision of the calendar in 1969 removed the mention of Stephen I from the General Roman Calendar, but, according to the terms of the General Instruction of the Roman Missal, the 2 August Mass may now everywhere be that of one of the Saints named that day in the Martyrologium Romanum of 2004, including Stephen I, unless in some locality an obligatory celebration is assigned to that day, while those permitted to use the pre-1969 calendar make commemoration of Saint Stephen I on that day.

Pope Stephen I is the patron of Hvar and of Modigliana Cathedral.

== See also ==
- List of Catholic saints
- List of popes

Titles of the Great Christian Church
Preceded by Lucius I	Bishop of Rome; 254–257	Succeeded by Sixtus II
