= Mario Toso =

The Most Reverend Mario Toso S.D.B.
- Bishop emeritus of Faenza-Modigliana
- Church: Roman Catholic Church
- Diocese: Faenza-Modigliana
- See: Faenza-Modigliana
- Appointed: 19 January 2015
- Installed: 15 March 2015
- Predecessor: Claudio Stagni
- Successor: Michele Morandi
- Previous posts: Rector Magnificus of the Salesian Pontifical University (2003-09); Titular Bishop of Bisarcio (2009-15); Secretary of the Pontifical Council for Justice and Peace (2009-15)

Orders
- Ordination: 22 July 1978 by Girolamo Bartolomeo Bortignon
- Consecration: 12 December 2009 by Tarcisio Bertone

Personal details
- Born: Mario Toso; 2 July 1950 (age 76) Mogliano Veneto, Treviso, Italy
- Motto: Caritas in Veritate ("Charity in Truth")
- Coat of arms

Styles of Mario Toso
- Reference style: The Most Reverend
- Spoken style: Your Excellency
- Religious style: Monsignor
- Posthumous style: none

Mario Toso S.D.B. (born 2 July 1950) is an Italian prelate in the Catholic Church, who was the Bishop of the Diocese of Faenza-Modigliana (2015–2026).

== Life ==
Toso was born in Mogliano Veneto (Province of Treviso). He was professed a member of the Salesians of Don Bosco on 16 August 1967. He studied philosophy and theology at the Faculty of Theology in Turin. He obtained a baccalaureate in theology. He was ordained a priest on 22 July 1978.

He holds a doctorate in philosophy at the Catholic University of Sacro Cuore in Milan in 1978. He earned a licentiate in philosophy from the Pontifical Salesian University in 1981 and a licentiate in theology at the Pontifical Lateran University in 1982. Since 1980 he has served as Professor of Philosophy at the Pontifical Salesian University from 1991 and is Professor of Theoretical Philosophy, from 1994 to 2000. He was Dean of the Faculty of Philosophy at the same University and from 2003 to 2009, he was Rector. He served as a consultor of the Pontifical Council for Justice and Peace. Toso was one of the collaborators consulted by Pope Benedict XVI's encyclical Caritas in veritate.

On 22 October 2009, he was appointed secretary of the Pontifical Council for Justice and Peace and Titular Bishop of Bisarcio, the titular see held by Bishop Crepaldi before his transfer to Trieste, and was consecrated on 12 December 2009 by Cardinal Secretary of State Tarcisio Bertone.

On 19 January 2015 he was appointed bishop of the Roman Catholic Diocese of Faenza-Modigliana by Pope Francis. He retired from this post on 18 April 2026.

Catholic Church titles
Preceded by Giampaolo Crepaldi	Secretary of the Pontifical Council for Justice and Peace; 22 October 2009–19 January 2015	Succeeded by incumbent
