= Diocese of Faenza-Modigliana =

Roman Catholic diocese in Italy

Coordinates: 44.2833°N 11.8833°E

Diocese of Faenza-Modigliana Dioecesis Faventina-Mutilensis

Catholic
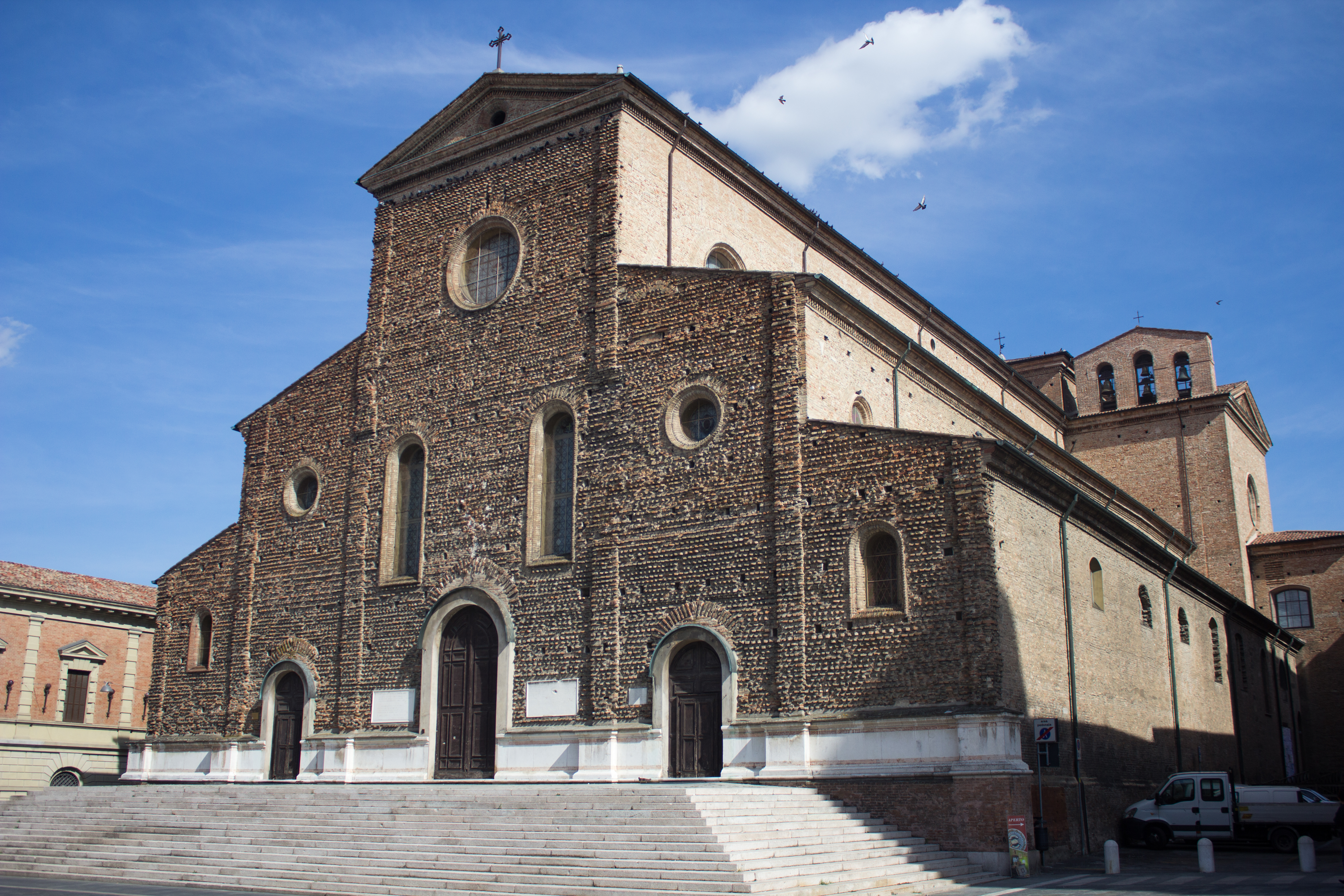
- Faenza Cathedral

Location
- Country: Italy

Statistics
- Area: 1.044 km^{2} (0.403 sq mi)
- Population: Total; Catholics: (as of 2023); 139,200 (est.) ▼; 130,800 (guess) ▼
- Parishes: 70

Information
- Rite: Roman
- Established: 3rd Century
- Cathedral: Basilica Cattedrale di S. Pietro Apostolo (Faenza)
- Co-cathedral: Concattedrale di S. Stefano (Modigliana)
- Secular priests: 57 (diocesan); 9 (Religious Orders); 15 Permanent Deacons

Current leadership
- Pope: Leo XIV
- Bishop: Michele Morandi
- Bishops emeritus: Mario Toso; Claudio Stagni

Map
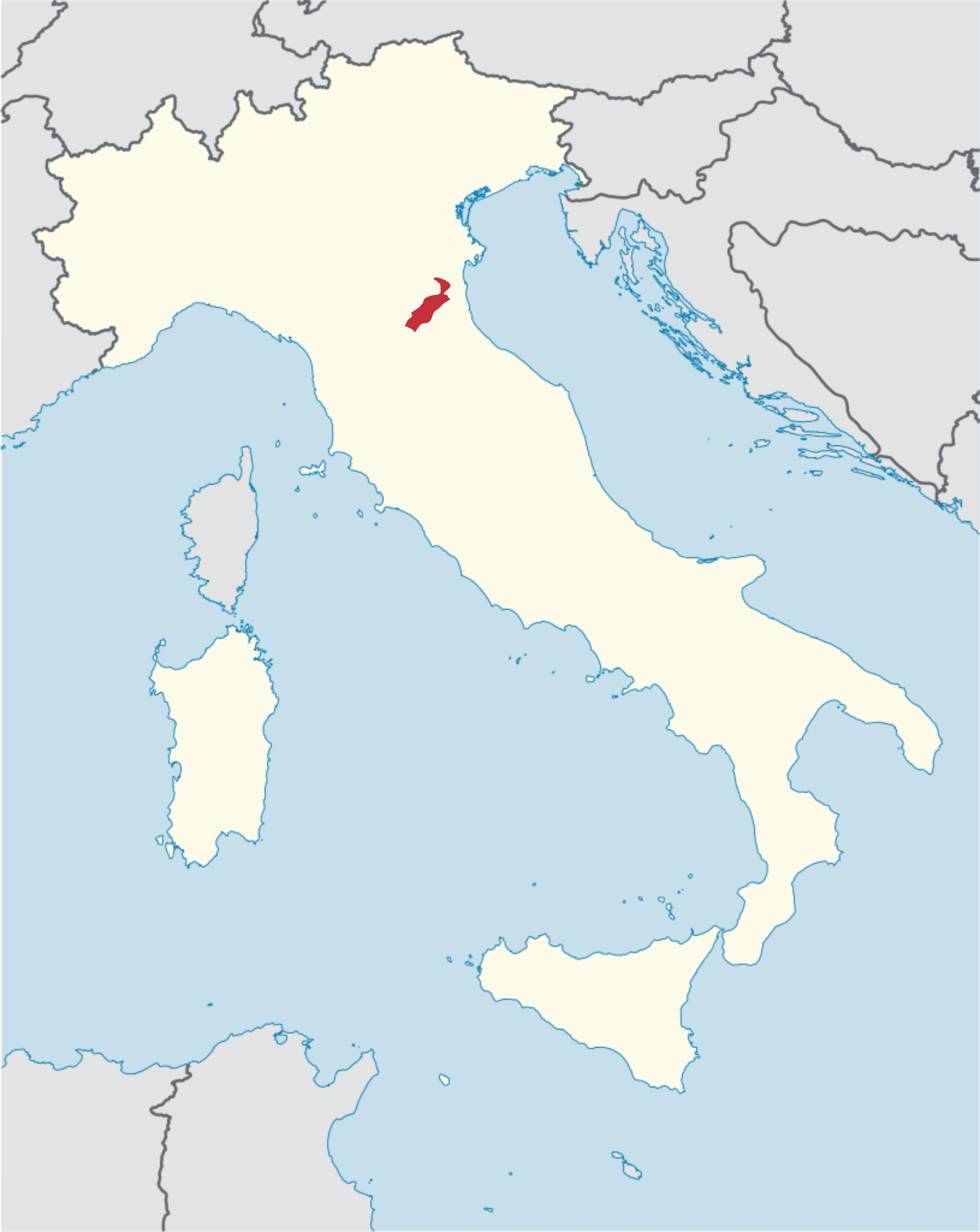

Website
- Diocesi di Faenza-Modigliana (in Italian)

The Diocese of Faenza-Modigliana (Latin: Dioecesis Faventina-Mutilensis) is a Latin Church diocese of the Catholic Church in Italy. It was created in 1986 through a merger of the diocese of Faenza and the diocese of Modigliana.

Originally the Diocese of Faenza (Faventia) was a suffragan (subordinate) of the Archbishop of Ravenna. In 1582 the diocese of Bologna was raised to the status of a metropolitan archbishopric by Pope Gregory XIII in the bull Universi orbis of 10 December 1582, and Faenza was made one of its suffragan dioceses.

== History ==
In 740, according to the Chronicon Faventinum of Canon Tolosanus of Faenza, the Lombard King Liutprand descended upon Faenza and put the town under siege. He was intent on seizing the Exarchate of Ravenna and expelling the last remaining Byzantine officials from northern Italy. Pope Gregory III, who was supporting the Exarch, and the people of Faenza who were supporting the Pope, were the object of the King's wrath. On Holy Saturday, in the evening, they broke into the Cathedral, where the annual solemn baptismal service was in progress, and killed or threw into chains nearly the entire population. The name and the fate of the bishop of Faenza are unknown.

Pope Gregory wrote immediately to Charles Martel, complaining of the destruction and depredations of the Lombard kings, and seeking aid of the Franks. Either Gregory or his successor Zacharias (Gregory died in November 741) ordered the bishop of Faenza to move his episcopal seat from S. Maria foris portam ('outside the gate'), where the outrage had taken place, to the church of S. Peter inside the city.

On 2 April 1787, Pope Pius VI transferred seven parishes from the jurisdiction of the bishop of Faenza to the jurisdiction of the Archbishop of Ravenna.

On 7 July 1850, in the bull Ea quo licet immerito, Pope Pius IX created the new diocese of Modigliana from eight parishes in the territory of the diocese of Faenza. This action was done at the repeated request of the Grand Duke of Tuscany, Leopold II, whose political domain included the lands that became the diocese of Modigliana. The Duke was unhappy to see persons under his temporal jurisdiction subject to an ecclesiastical authority (Faenza) which was outside of his domain. The new diocese was assigned to the ecclesiastical province of Florence, and the Collegiate Church of S. Stefano de Mutilano became a cathedral. In 1853, when its first bishop was appointed, Modigliana was transferred to the ecclesiastical province of Bologna. Ruggero Bovelli was appointed bishop of Modigliana on 5 August 1915, and when a vacancy occurred in the diocese of Faenza, he was also appointed Bishop of Faenza, on 24 March 1924, and on 1 May the decree was issued uniting the two dioceses in the person of Bishop Bovelli. On 5 June 1970, Marino Bergonzini was named both Coadjutor Bishop of Faenza and Bishop of Modigliana. Francesco Tarcisio Bertozzi was appointed Bishop of Faenza and Bishop of Modigliana on 6 August 1982.

In compliance with a Constitution of the Second Vatican Council, and following norms established by Pope John XXIII, after extensive consultations with all interested parties, and with the consent of Pope John Paul II, the Vatican Congregation of Bishops issued a decree on 30 September 1986, uniting the two dioceses of Faenza and Modigliana under one bishop, with one Curia, and with one seat, and one Cathedral Chapter, in Faenza. The former cathedral of Modigliana was reduced to the rank of co-cathedral, and was allowed to keep its Chapter of Canons.

=== Cathedral and Chapter ===
In 816, the Emperor Louis the Pious held a council at Aix, at which it was ordered that Canons and Canonesses live together according to a set of rules (canons, regulae). In the Roman synod of Pope Eugene II of November 826, it was ordered that Canons live together in a cloister next to the church. In 876, the Council of Pavia decreed in Canon X that the bishops should enclose the Canons: uti episcopi in civitatibus suis proximum ecclesiae claustrum instituant, in quo ipsi cum clero secundum canonicam regulam Deo militent, et sacerdotes suos ad hoc constringant, ut ecclesiam non relinquant et alibi habitare praesumant.

The office of Archdeacon is older than the Chapter of Canons, being attested as early as 883. In 1045 the dignities of Archdeacon and Provost are found combined in one person. But, after 1179, there is no mention of the Archdeacon, until the office was restored on 14 May 1517 by Pope Leo X.

According to tradition, the Canons and Canonry at Faenza were established by Bishop Paulus, a figure of the mid-tenth century.

In 1045, according to the Chronicon of Canon Tolosanus of Faenza, a fire consumed Faenza, and the cathedral along with it. The scrinium, where the diocese's documents were kept, was severely damaged. An effort was made immediately to recover, repair, or restore the most important documents. On 23 April, a large public meeting took place next to the wall of the cathedral, Bishop Eutychius (Etico) presiding, and the constitutions of the Cathedral Chapter were reconstructed. The Chapter and the Canonica, it was remembered, had been instituted by Bishop Paulus, and had provided for thirty Canons. The properties from which they derived their income included the cathedral parish, the parish of S. Pietro in luna, the monastery of S. Stephen Protomartyr in Faenza, the monastery of S. Vitale, and the monastery of S. Savini, along with numerous towns and estates.

A note in the archives of the Cathedral Chapter indicates that Bishop Federico Manfredi (1471-1478) was the last bishop to be elected by the Chapter.

In 1682, the Chapter was composed of three dignities and fifteen Canons. In 1742, there were sixteen Canons.

=== Synods ===
A diocesan synod was an irregularly held, but important, meeting of the bishop of a diocese and his clergy. Its purpose was (1) to proclaim generally the various decrees already issued by the bishop; (2) to discuss and ratify measures on which the bishop chose to consult with his clergy; (3) to publish statutes and decrees of the diocesan synod, of the provincial synod, and of the Holy See.

Bishop Ugolinus, O.Min. (1311-1336) presided at a diocesan synod in 1312, probably in September; and at another in 1321.

Bishop Giovanni Battista Sighicelli (1562–1575) presided over a diocesan synod in Faenza on 5 October 1569. This was the first diocesan held after the close of the Council of Trent.

Cardinal Erminio Valenti (1605–1618), Bishop of Faenza, held a diocesan synod on 15 October 1615. On 11 June 1620, Bishop Giulio Monterenzi (1618–1623) presided over a diocesan synod. Cardinal Francesco Cennini, Bishop of Faenza (1623–1643), presided over a diocesan synod on 26 April 1629. On 4–6 July 1647, Cardinal Carlo Rossetti, Bishop of Faenza (1643–1681), celebrated his first diocesan synod. His second synod took place on 7 October 1649. The third synod was held on 1 June 1651. The fourth took place on 15–16 October 1654. The fifth was held on 18–19 October 1657; the sixth on 13–14 May 1660; the seventh on 18–19 October 1663; the eighth on 17–18 May 1668; and the ninth on 18–20 October 1674. Cardinal Gianfrancesco Negroni, Bishop of Faenza (1687–1697) presided over a diocesan synod which began on 30 August 1694.

A diocesan synod was held by Bishop Antonio Cantoni (1742–1767) on 25–27 June 1748, and its Constitutions were published.

Bishop Giuseppe Battaglia (1944–1976) held a diocesan synod in 1949.

== Bishops of Faenza ==
[Sabinus]
...

- Leontius (attested 649)

...

- Romanus (attested 861)

...

- Paulus (c. 920 ?)

...

- Gerardus (attested 954–973)

...

- Ildeprandus (attested 998–1022)

...

- Eutychius (Etico) (attested 1032–1056)
- Petrus (1056–1063)
- Hugo (attested 1063)
- P[ - - ] (c. 1065 to 1067)
- Leo (attested 1076)
- Hugo (attested 1084)
- Robertus (attested 1086, 1104)
- Petrus (attested 1116)
- Jacobus (attested 1118, 1126, 1130)
- Rambertus
- Joannes
- Bernardus
- Theoderic Frasconi

=== from 1200 to 1500 ===
- Ubaldus (1205–1208)
- Joachim (1209–1210)
- Orlandus (Rolando) (1210–1221)
- Albertus (1222– after 1239)
- Julianus (1242-1249)
- Gualtierius Poggi, O.S.A. (1251-1257)
- Giacomo Petrella (1258-1273)
- Theodericus, O.P. (1274-1281)
- Vivianus (1282-1287)
- Lottieri della Tosa (1287-1302)
- Matteo Eschini, O.S.A. (1302-1311)
- Ugolinus, O.Min. (1311-1336)
- Giovanni da Brusata, C.R.S.A. (1337-1342)
- Stephanus Benerii (1343–c. 1378)
- Francesco Uguccione (1378–1383)

Lupus (1378–1390) (Avignon Obedience)

- Angelo Ricasoli (1383-1391)
- Orso da Gubbio, O.S.B. (1391-1402)
- Niccolò Ubertini (1402-1406)
- Pietro de Pago, O.Min. (1406–1411)

Sede vacante (1411–after 1414)
[Antonio de Solarolo]

- Silvestro de la Casa (1418?–1428)
- Giovanni da Faventia, O.Min. (1428–1438)
- Francesco Zanelli de Faventia, O.Serv. (1438–1454)

Sede Vacante (1454–1455)

- Giovanni Terma (1455–1457)
- Alessandro Stampetti (1458–1463)
- Bartolomeo Gandolfi (1463–1470)
- Federico Manfredi (1470-1478)
- Battista de' Canonici, O.S.B. (1478–1510)

=== from 1500 to 1800 ===
- Giacomo Pasi (1510–1528)
- Petrus Andreas Gambari (Pier Andrea Gambari) (1528)
- Cardinal Rodolfo Pio (1528–1544)
- Teodoro Pio (1544–1561)
- Giovanni Battista Sighicelli (1562–1575)
- Annibale Grassi (1575–1585 Resigned)
- Gian Antonio Grassi (1585–1602 Died)
- Cardinal Gian Francesco Biandrate di San Giorgio Aldobrandini (1603–1605)
- Erminio Valenti (1605–1618 Died)
- Giulio Monterenzi (1618–1623)
- Cardinal Marco Antonio Gozzadini (1623–1623 Died)
- Cardinal Francesco Cennini de' Salamandri (1623–1643 Resigned)
- Carlo Rossetti (1643–1681 Died)
- Cardinal Antonio Pignatelli del Rastrello (1682–1686)
- Cardinal Giovanni Francesco Negroni (1687–1697 Resigned)
- Cardinal Marcello Durazzo (1697–1710)
- Cardinal Giulio Piazza (1710–1726)
- Tommaso Cervioni, O.E.S.A. (1726–1729)
- Niccolò Maria Lomellini, C.R.S. (1729–1742 Died)
- Antonio Cantoni (1742–1767)
- Vitale Giuseppe de' Buoi (1767–1787 Died)
- Domenico Mancinforte (1787–1805 Died)

=== from 1800 to 1986 ===
- Stefano Bonsignore (1807–1826 Died)
- Giovanni Niccolò Tanari (Tanara) (1827–1832 Resigned)
- Giovanni Benedetto Folicaldi (1832–1867)
- Angelo Pianori, O.F.M. (1871–1884 Died)
- Gioachino Cantagalli (1884–1912 Died)
- Vincenzo Bacchi (1912–1924 Died)
- Ruggero Bovelli (1924–1929 Appointed Archbishop of Ferrara)
- Antonio Scarante (1930–1944 Died)
- Giuseppe Battaglia (1944–1976 Retired)
- Marino Bergonzini (1976–1982 Retired)
- Francesco Tarcisio Bertozzi (1982–1996 Died)

=== Bishops of Faenza-Modigliana ===
- Benvenuto Italo Castellani (1997–2003 Appointed Coadjutor Archbishop of Lucca)
- Claudio Stagni (2004–2015 Retired)
- Mario Toso, S.D.B. (2015–2026)
- Michele Morandi (2026–present)

== See also ==
- Diocese of Modigliana

== Books ==
=== Reference works for bishops ===
- Gams, Pius Bonifatius (1873). Series episcoporum Ecclesiae catholicae: quotquot innotuerunt a beato Petro apostolo (in Latin). Ratisbon: Typis et Sumptibus Georgii Josephi Manz. pp. 688–689.
- Eubel, Conradus, ed. (1913). Hierarchia catholica (in Latin). Vol. 1 (second ed.). Münster: Libreria Regensbergiana. (in Latin) [frequently in error in matters concerning Faenza: he did not use Messeri or have access to Valgimigli's manuscripts]
- Eubel, Conradus, ed. (1914). Hierarchia catholica (in Latin). Vol. 2 (second ed.). Münster: Libreria Regensbergiana.
- Gulik, Guilelmus (1923). Eubel, Conradus (ed.). Hierarchia catholica (in Latin). Vol. 3 (second ed.). Münster: Libreria Regensbergiana.
- Gauchat, Patritius (Patrice) (1935). Hierarchia catholica (in Latin). Vol. IV (1592-1667). Münster: Libraria Regensbergiana.
- Ritzler, Remigius; Sefrin, Pirminus (1952). Hierarchia catholica medii et recentis aevi (in Latin). Vol. V (1667-1730). Patavii: Messagero di S. Antonio.
- Ritzler, Remigius; Sefrin, Pirminus (1958). Hierarchia catholica medii et recentis aevi (in Latin). Vol. VI (1730-1799). Patavii: Messagero di S. Antonio.
- Ritzler, Remigius; Sefrin, Pirminus (1968). Hierarchia Catholica medii et recentioris aevi (in Latin). Vol. VII (1800–1846). Monasterii: Libreria Regensburgiana.
- Remigius Ritzler; Pirminus Sefrin (1978). Hierarchia catholica Medii et recentioris aevi (in Latin). Vol. VIII (1846–1903). Il Messaggero di S. Antonio.
- Pięta, Zenon (2002). Hierarchia catholica medii et recentioris aevi (in Latin). Vol. IX (1903–1922). Padua: Messagero di San Antonio. ISBN 978-88-250-1000-8.

=== Studies ===
- Azzurrini, Bernardino (1905). Antonio Messeri (ed.). Chronica breviora aliaque monumenta Faventina a Bernardino Azzurrinio collecta. Rerum Italicarum Scriptores, XXVIII, parte iii (in Latin and Italian). Tipi della casa editrice S. Lapi.
- Cappelletti, Giuseppe (1844). Le Chiese d'Italia dalla loro origine sino ai nostri giorni (in Italian). Vol. secondo. Venezia: Antonelli. pp. 241–306.
- Kehr, Paul Fridolin (1906). Italia Pontificia Vol. V: Aemilia, sive Provincia Ravennas. Berlin: Weidmann, pp. 146–160. (in Latin).
- Lanzoni, Francesco (1906). I primordi della chiesa faentina (in Italian). Faenza: Tip. Novelli & Castellani.
- Lanzoni, Francesco (1913). Cronotassi dei vescovi di Faenza dai primordi a tutto il secola XIII ... e col catalogo dei vescovi fino ad oggi compilato dal canonico G. Rossini (Faenza: Tip. Novelli e Castellani 1913) (in Italian)
- Lanzoni, Francesco (1927). Le diocesi d'Italia dalle origini al principio del secolo VII (an. 604). Faenza: F. Lega, pp. 769–773. (in Italian)
- Righi, Bartolomeo (1840). Annali della città di Faenza (in Italian). Vol. I. Faenza: Montanari e Marabini. Righi, Bartolomeo (1840). Volume II. Righi, Bartolomeo (1841). Volume III.
- Scaletta, Carlo-Cesare (1726). Notizie della chiesa e diocesi di Faenza (in Italian). Faenza: Archi.
- Schwartz, Gerhard (1907). Die Besetzung der Bistümer Reichsitaliens unter den sächsischen und salischen Kaisern: mit den Listen der Bischöfe, 951-1122. Leipzig: B.G. Teubner. (in German) pp. 170–172.
- Stefani, Guglielmo (1856). Dizionario corografico dello Stato Pontificio (in Italian). Milano e Verona: Civelli G. e C. pp. 310–325.
- Strocchi, Andrea (1838). Memorie istoriche del Duomo di Faenza e de'personaggi illustri di quel capitolo (in Italian). Faenza: Tip. Montanari e Marabini.
- Ughelli, Ferdinando; Coleti, Niccolo (1717). Italia sacra sive de Episcopis Italiae (in Latin). Vol. Tomus secundus (II) (secunda ed.). Venice: Apud Sebastianum Coleti. pp. 490–513.
- Valgimigli, Gian Marcello (1844). Intorno alla città di Faenza memorie storiche raccolte da G.M.V. (in Italian). Faenza: per Pietro Conti.
- Valgimigli's unpublished eighteen volume Memorie istoriche di Faenza is available for download in PDF format from the Biblioteca digitale faentina. Retrieved: 14 December 2018. (in Italian)
