= Luigi del Riccio =

Luigi del Riccio was an acquaintance of Michelangelo who was deeply hurt by the death of his nephew Cecchino Bracci. He gave Michelangelo many gifts so that Michelangelo would keep writing him epitaphs.

Michelangelo became irritated by Riccio's gifts and wrote "This piece is said by the trout, and not by me; so if you don't like the verses, don't marinate them any more with pepper." Riccio's friendship with Michelangelo ended when he learned that Riccio had planned to publish all the epitaphs unaltered, and Michelangelo begged him to destroy them. Michelangelo was uncomfortable with the poem's homoeroticism and begged "You certainly have the power to disgrace me." Riccio relented.
