= Erminio Valenti =

Italian Roman Catholic cardinal

His Eminence Erminio Valenti
- Cardinal-Priest of Santa Maria in Traspontina; Bishop of Faenza
- Church: Catholic Church

Orders
- Consecration: 18 Sep 1605 by Pietro Aldobrandini

Personal details
- Born: 1564 Trevi, Italy
- Died: 22 Aug 1618 (age 54)

Erminio Valenti (1564 – 22 August 1618) was a Roman Catholic cardinal.

== Biography ==
On 18 Sep 1605, he was consecrated bishop by Pietro Aldobrandini, Archbishop of Ravenna, with Ludovico de Torres, Archbishop of Monreale, and Laudivio Zacchia, Bishop of Corneto e Montefiascone, serving as co-consecrators. He also served 1604-1618 as bishop of Faenza.

== External links and additional sources ==
- Cheney, David M. "Diocese of Faenza-Modigliana". Catholic-Hierarchy.org. (for Chronology of Bishops) ^{[self-published]}
- Chow, Gabriel. "Diocese of Faenza-Modigliana (Italy)". GCatholic.org. (for Chronology of Bishops) ^{[self-published]}

Catholic Church titles
Preceded by Lorenzo Priuli (cardinal)	Cardinal-Priest of Santa Maria in Traspontina; 1604–1618	Succeeded by Alessandro Ludovisi
Preceded by Gian Francesco Biandrate di San Giorgio Aldobrandini	Bishop of Faenza; 1605–1618	Succeeded by Giulio Monterenzi
