= Giovanni Francesco Negroni =

Italian cardinal

- Cardinal, Bishop of Faenza
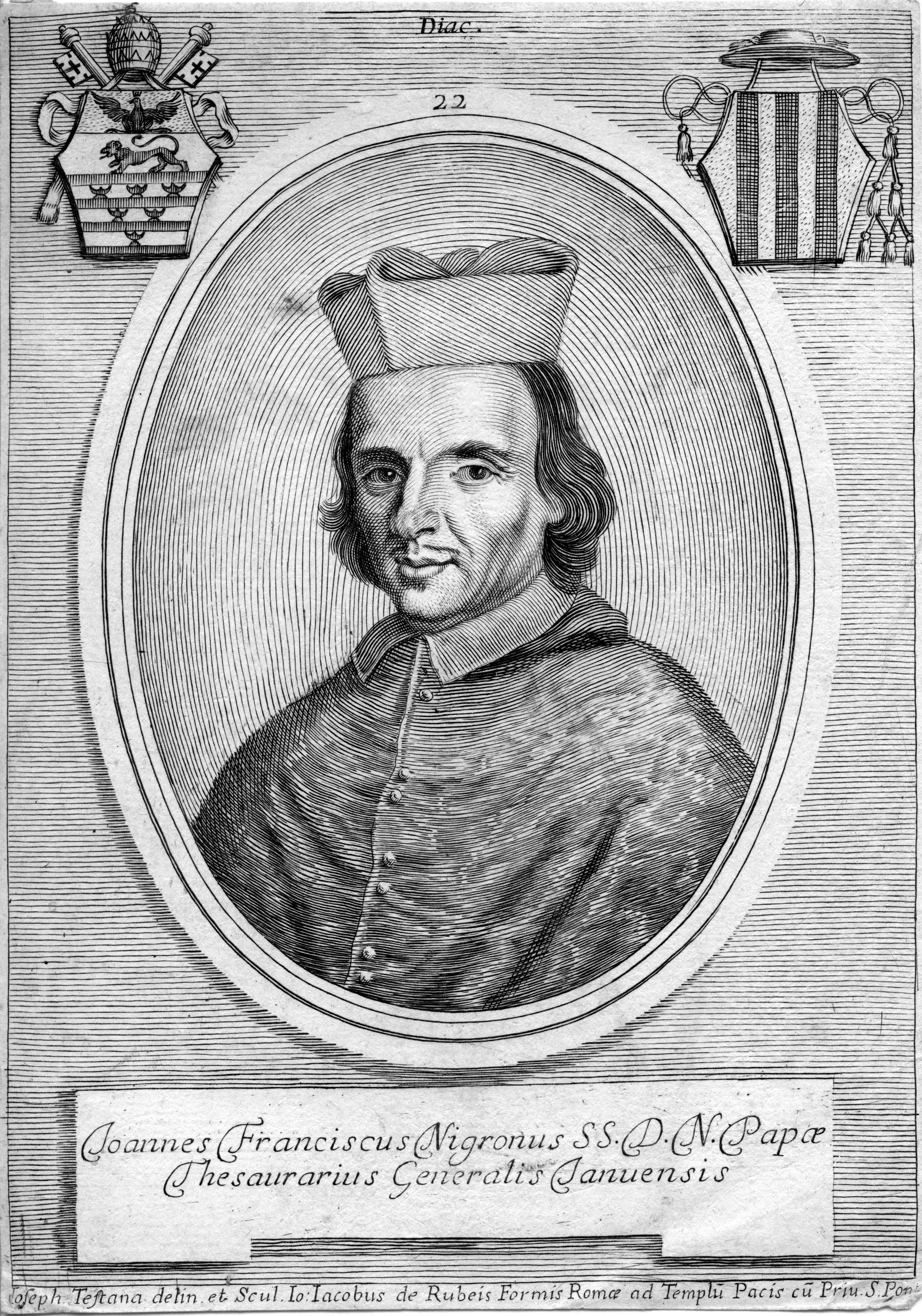
- Church: Catholic Church
- See: Faenza
- Appointed: 7 July 1687
- Term ended: 11 November 1697
- Predecessor: Cardinal Antonio Pignatelli del Rastrello
- Successor: Cardinal Marcello Durazzo
- Other post: Cardinal Priest of Santa Maria in Ara Coeli

Orders
- Consecration: 20 July 1687 (Bishop) by Marcantonio Barbarigo
- Created cardinal: 2 September 1686 by Pope Innocent XI

Personal details
- Born: October 3, 1629 Genoa
- Died: 1 January 1713 (aged 83) Roma
- Buried: Church of the Gesù

Giovanni Francesco Negroni (1629 – 1713) was a Catholic cardinal who served as Bishop of Faenza from 1687 to 1697, and as Legate (i.e. Governor) of Bologna from 1687 to 1690.

== Life ==
Giovanni Francesco Negroni was born in Genua on 3 October 1629 to a senatorial family. He graduated in utroque iure in Perugia.

He took up a career in the administration of the Papal States: governor of Terni in 1658, Vice-legato of Romagna in 1661, Governor of Jesi in 1663, Governor of Orvieto in 1664, Governor of Spoleto in 1665 and in the same year he was appointed Protonotary apostolic. Governor of Perugia in 1668.

In 1669 or 1670, he purchased the title of clerk of the Apostolic Camera in Rome. In October 1679, in Rome, he took the offices of Prefect of the Annona with the responsibility for the grain supply to the city of Rome, and in 1681, he became General Treasurer of the Apostolic Camera, working with Pope Innocent XI to reduce the expenses of the Papal States, and in that position he succeeded to perform a restructuring of the debt of the State.

On 2 September 1686, Pope Innocent XI appointed him Cardinal deacon with the title of San Cesareo de Appia.

On 7 July 1687, he was appointed bishop of Faenza. His episcopal consecration followed on 20 July in Rome by the hands of cardinal Marcantonio Barbarigo. On 10 November 1687, he was appointed Legate (i.e. Governor) of Bologna. This office, as usually, lasted three years.

Negroni paid and organized the renovation of the chapel of S. Francesco Saverio in the Church of the Gesù, the main church of the Jesuits, also to reaffirm his status of Cardinal Protector of the Jesuits.

During the 1691 papal conclave, Negroni wrote a manifesto for the faction of the zelanti cardinals, who desired that the election of the Pope were free from nepotism and from the interferences of France, Spain and Holy Empire. In the same conclave, with compromising documents he stopped the candidature of Paluzzo Paluzzi Altieri degli Albertoni, the Cardinal-Nephew to Pope Clement X.

As bishop of Faenza he lived in that town only occasionally, and in 1694 he held a diocesan synod.

On 2 January 1696, he was promoted to Cardinal priest with the title of Santa Maria in Ara Coeli. He resigned the bishopric of Faenza on 11 November 1697, passing the last years in Rome, where he died on 1 January 1713. He was buried in the chapel of S. Francesco Saverio in the Church of the Gesù.
