= Roman Catholic Diocese of Modigliana =

The Diocese of Modigliana was a Latin Catholic diocese of Roman Rite in central Italy, erected on 7 July 1850. On 30 September 1986 it was merged with the Diocese of Faenza to form the Diocese of Faenza-Modigliana.

== Precarious existence of the diocese ==
On 7 July 1850, with the bull Ea quo licet immerito, Pope Pius IX created the new diocese of Modigliana from eight parishes in the territory of the diocese of Faenza. This was done in tardy response to the repeated request of the Grand Duke of Tuscany, Leopold II, whose political domain included the lands that became the diocese of Modigliana. The Duke, whose sovereign state was less than a decade later to be annexed to the new Kingdom of Italy, was unhappy to see populations under his temporal jurisdiction subject to an ecclesiastical authority (Faenza) which was outside of his domain. In line with these intentions, the new diocese was assigned to the ecclesiastical province of Florence, capital of the Grand Duchy. The Collegiate Church of S. Stefano de Mutilano became the cathedral of the new diocese. However, there was a notable interval between the erection of the diocese and the appointment of its first bishop. When in 1853, Mario Melini was finally appointed to the post, his new diocese of Modigliana was no longer to be a suffragan of Florence, but was transferred to the ecclesiastical province of Bologna. Bologna and its surrounding territory belonged at that period to the Papal States.

A further sign of a degree of uncertainty regarding the Modigliana diocese was seen in the early twentieth century. Ruggero Bovelli was appointed bishop of Modigliana on 5 August 1915. However, on 24 March 1924, when a vacancy occurred in the diocese of Faenza, he was appointed to become simultaneously Bishop of Faenza, and on 1 May a decree of the Holy See was issued uniting the two dioceses in the person of Bishop Bovelli. In subsequent years, however, bishops were appointed to govern the two dioceses separately.

After the watershed of the Second Vatican Council, on 5 June 1970, Marino Bergonzini was appointed both Coadjutor Bishop of Faenza (where a Bishop was still in situ but near retirement) and Bishop of Modigliana. Then on 6 August 1982, Francesco Tarcisio Bertozzi was appointed, like his predecessor Bishop Bovelli, both Bishop of Faenza and at the same time Bishop of Modigliana.

Not many years later, on 30 September 1986, in the light of norms established by Pope John XXIII and principles enunciated by the Second Vatican Council, and following extensive consultations with the parties concerned, the Holy See's Congregation for Bishops, with the consent of Pope John Paul II, issued a decree permanently uniting the two dioceses of Faenza and Modigliana under a single bishop, with one Curia, and with one seat, and one Cathedral Chapter, in Faenza. The former cathedral of Modigliana was reduced to the rank of co-cathedral, but was allowed to keep its Chapter of Canons. The move was not only directed to circumstances in the Faenza-Modigliana region but was paralleled by similar measures regarding dioceses in numerous parts of Italy. Nevertheless, with this measure, in a changed age and after little more than a century, the always slightly precarious existence of a separate diocese of Modigliana, provoked by the political policy of a Grand Duke long relieved of sovereignty, came to an end. The reunited Diocese of Faenza-Modigliana is currently a suffragan of the metropolitan archdiocese of Bologna.

== Bishops of Modigliana ==
- Mario Melini (1853-1865 Died)
- Leonardo Giannotti (1871-1895 Died)
- Sante Mei (1895-1907 Resigned)
- Luigi Capotosti (1908-1915 appointed Titular Bishop of Thermae Basilicae)
- Ruggero Bovelli (1915-1924 appointed, Bishop of Faenza)
- Massimiliano Massimiliani (1931-1960 died)
- Antonio Ravagli (1960-1970 resigned)
- Marino Bergonzini (1970-1982 retired)
- Francesco Tarcisio Bertozzi (1982-1986 appointed Bishop of Faenza-Modigliana)
