= Congregation for Borders =

Congregation of the Roman Curia set up by Pope Urban VIII

The Congregation for Borders (Congregazione dei Confini) was a congregation of the Roman Curia. It was set up by Pope Urban VIII in his apostolic constitution Debitum pastoralis officii on 1 October 1627 to oversee the borders of the Papal States. It was suppressed in 1847.
