= Diocese of Faenza =

Former Diocese of the Catholic Church in Faenza, Italy

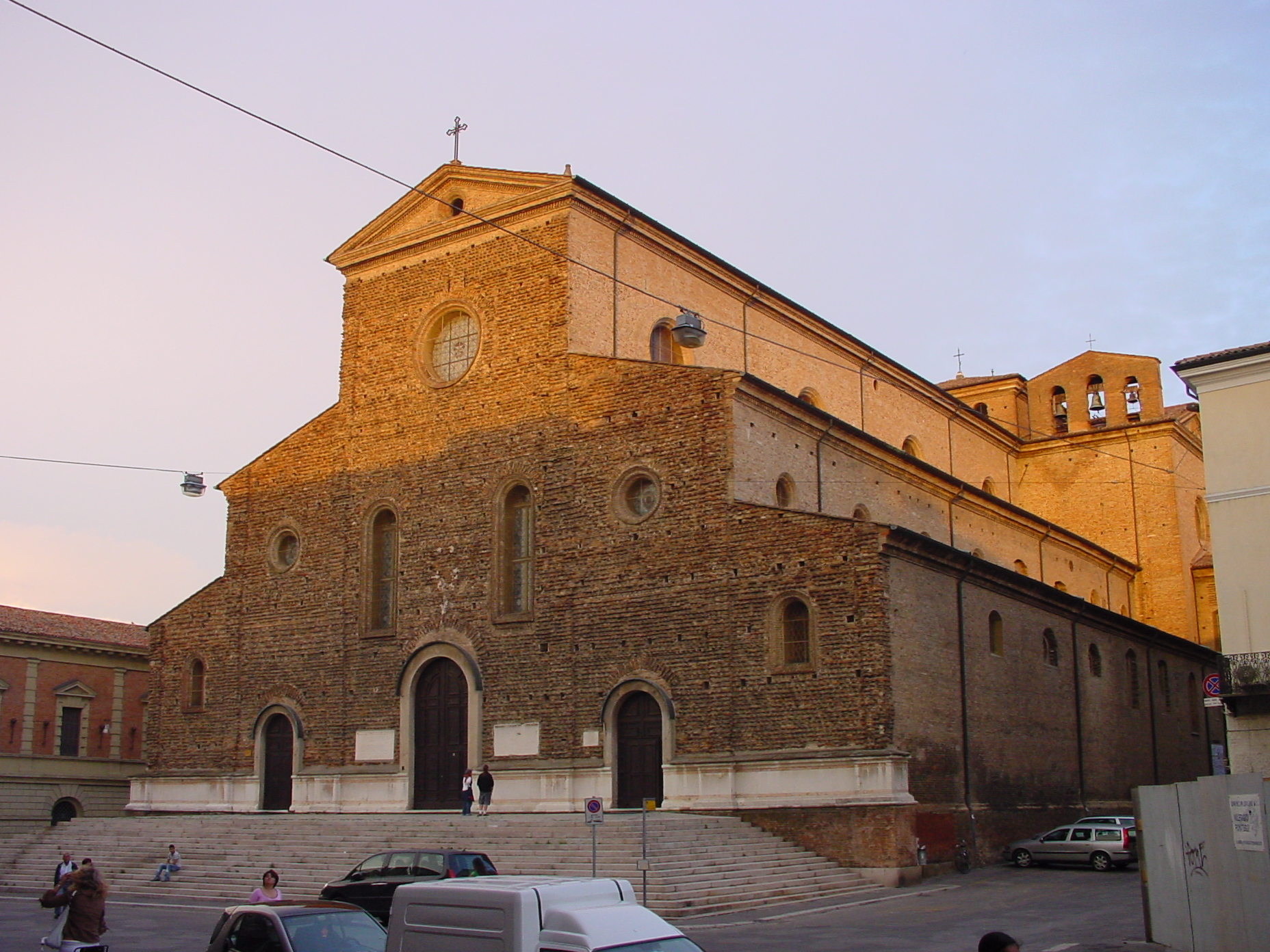
Faenza Cathedral

The Diocese of Faenza was a Latin Catholic diocese of Roman Rite in central Italy. In 1986 it was merged with the diocese of Modigliana to create the Diocese of Faenza-Modigliana.
