= Faenza Cathedral =

Cathedral in Faenza, Italy

Coordinates: 44.2859°N 11.884369°E

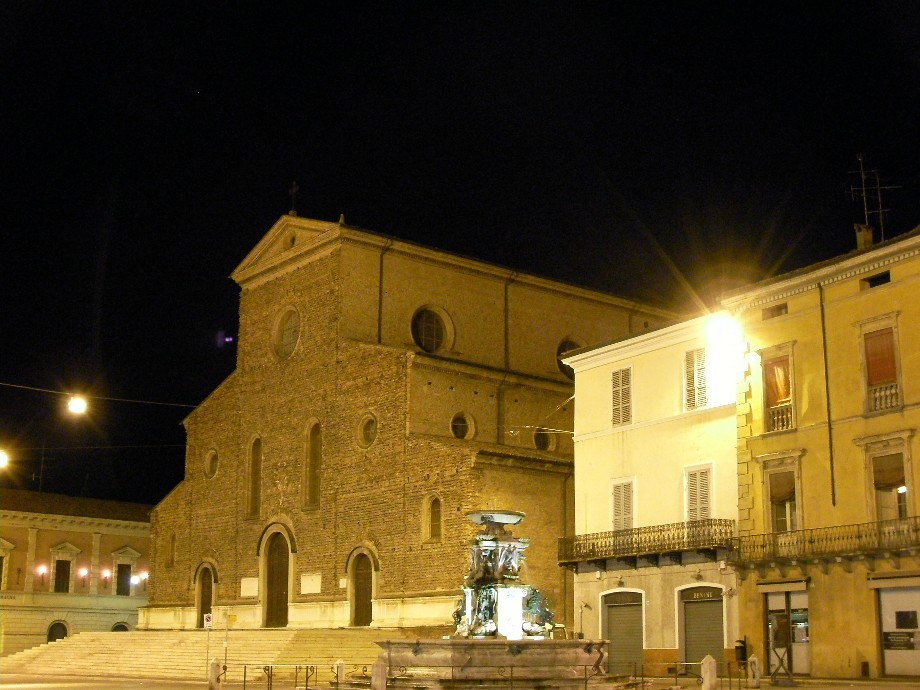
Faenza Cathedral, west front

Faenza Cathedral (Italian: Duomo di Faenza, Cattedrale di San Pietro Apostolo) is a Roman Catholic cathedral built in the style of the Tuscan Renaissance in central Faenza, Italy. It is the seat of the Bishop of Faenza-Modigliana and is dedicated to Saint Peter the Apostle.

== History ==
Construction of the cathedral began in 1474, on the site of a previous cathedral about which very little is known, by order of Carlo II Manfredi (lord of Faenza between 1468 and 1477), while his brother Federico was bishop of Faenza. The architect was the Florentine Giuliano da Maiano. Construction finished in 1515. The dedication to Saint Peter did not take place until 1581. The cathedral also has the status of a basilica minor.

== Description ==
The brick façade was left incomplete, in the sense that it was never fully faced in marble or stone. The church is built on a Latin cross ground plan. In the interior Giuliano appears to have been influenced by Brunelleschi's design of San Lorenzo, Florence, particularly in the use of alternating columns and pillars, especially noticeable in the arcades separating the central nave from the two side-aisles.

== Works of art ==
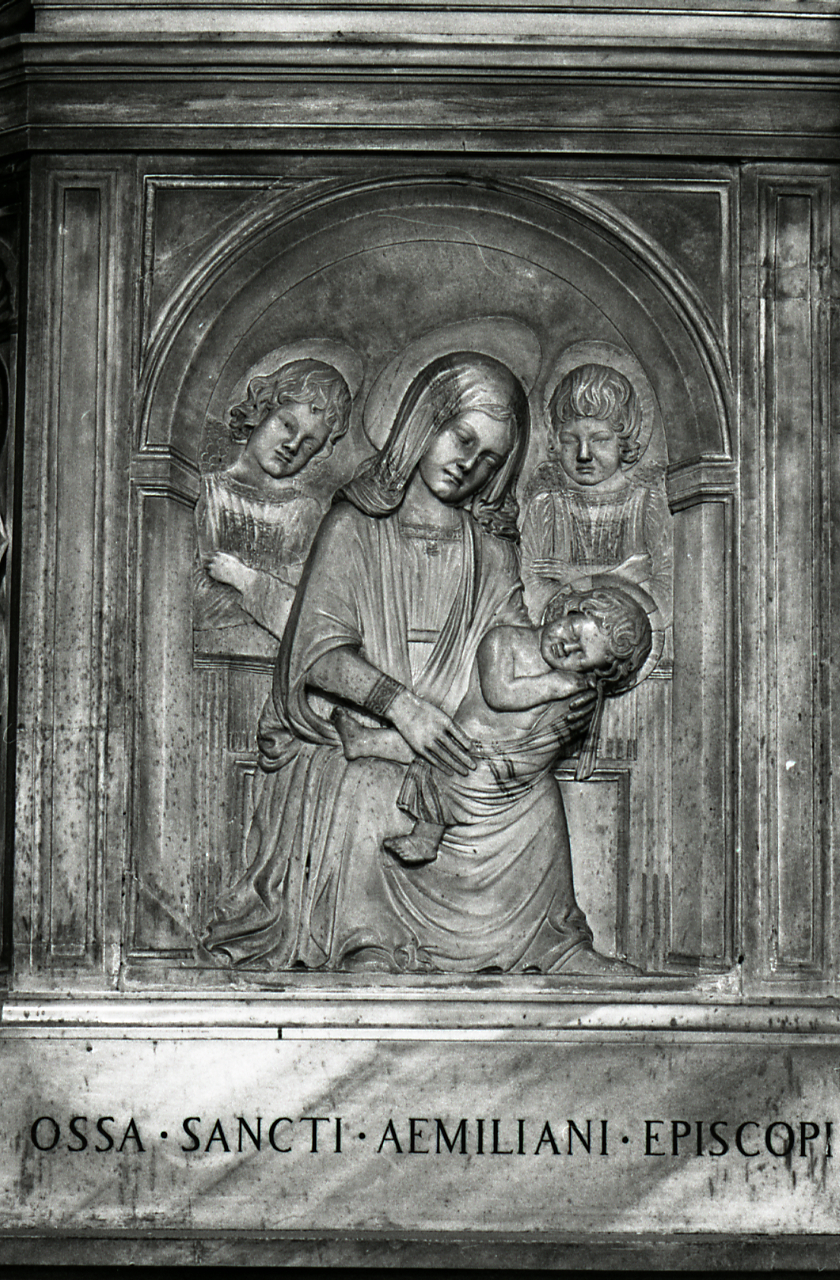
Details of the ark of Saint Emilianus the Bishop. Photo by Paolo Monti, 1979.

The interior houses numerous works of art, particularly Renaissance sculpture. Of especial note are: the Chapel of the Blessed Virgin of Graces, built as a diocesan sanctuary, which contains a fresco of 1412, depicting the Blessed Virgin Mary breaking arrows, symbolising the dangers against which she offers protection; the tomb of Saint Terence, made in 1462 by an unnamed Tuscan master; the tomb of Saint Savinus (third quarter of the 15th century), possibly sculpted in Florence by Benedetto da Maiano (brother of the architect); and the tomb of Saint Emilianus from the second half of the 15th century, of which some of the marble reliefs are now in the Musée Jacquemart-André in Paris.

The cathedral also contains a crucifix sculpted by an unknown Northern European wood sculptor (15th century) and, by Innocenzo da Imola, the Bonaccorsi Altarpiece, a 16th-century table still with its original gold and carved cornice and a painting of the Blessed Virgin Mary with the Infant Jesus and Saints John the Baptist, Peter and Paul, Joachim and Ann (oil on canvas, 1526).

The wooden choir stalls by the high altar are from 1513.

Since 1898 the body of Saint Peter Damian has been buried in a side chapel.

On the cathedral square in front of the building are the arcades known as the Portico degli Orefici ("Portico of the Goldsmiths"), built about 1610, and the monumental fountains, the bronzes of which also date from the 17th century.

== Bibliography ==
- Bellezza fede e cultura, Itinerari nella diocesi Faenza-Modigliana, under the direction of the Ufficio diocesano per l'arte sacra e i beni culturali. Faenza: Tipografia faentina (nd)
- Il Duomo di Faenza: Faenza: Tipografia faentina (nd)
- La Madonna delle Grazie di Faenza, Notizie storiche, under the direction of the Arciconfraternita della Beata Vergine delle Grazie. Faenza: Tipografia faentina (2000)
- Il duomo di Faenza, under the direction of Antonio Savioli. Florence: Nardini (1988)
