= Ugoni =

Ugoni is a surname. Notable people with the surname include:

- Gianfrancesco Ugoni (died 1543), Roman Catholic prelate
- Mattia Ugoni, Roman Catholic prelate
