= Marco Gradenigo (patriarch of Venice) =

- Patriarch of Venice
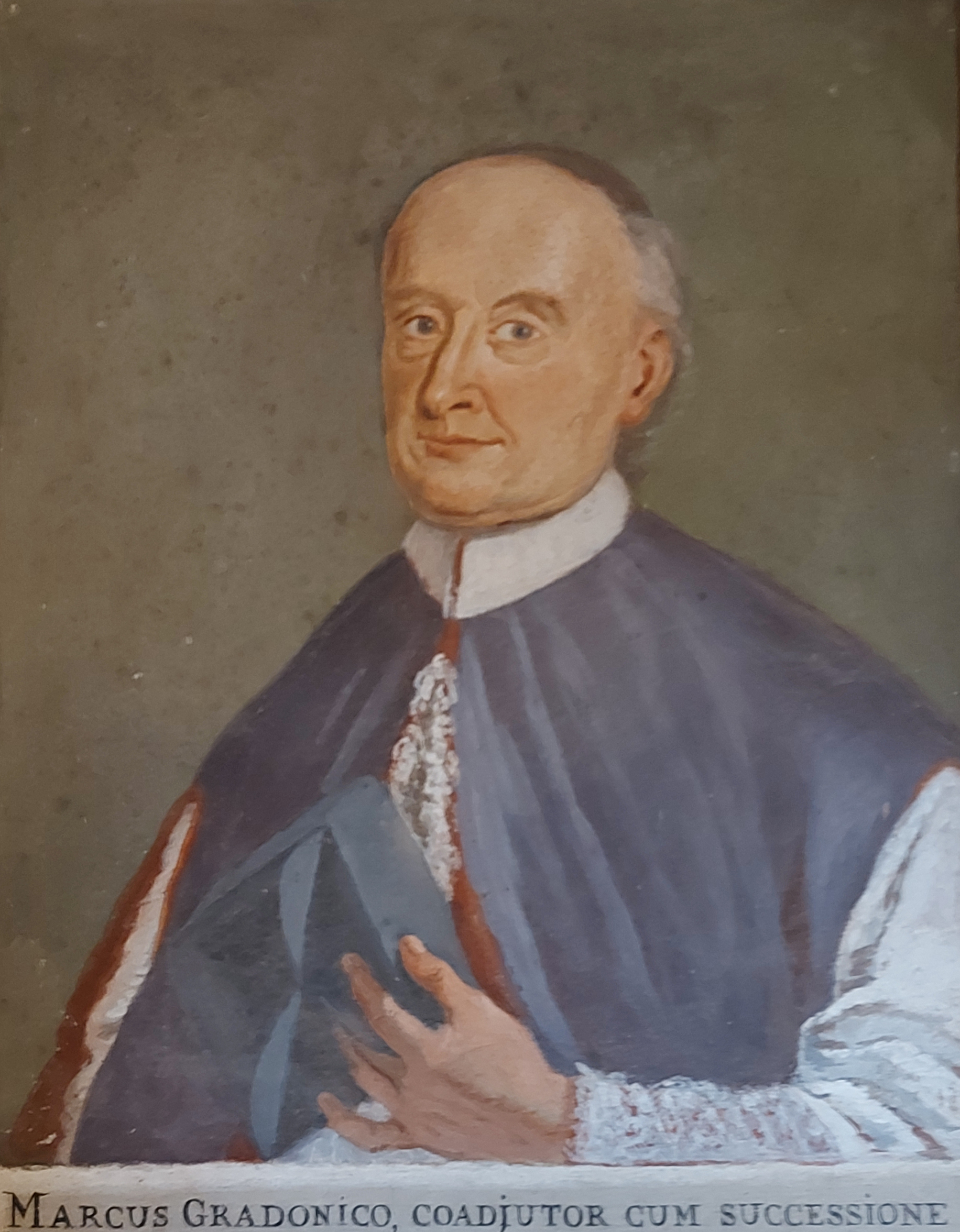
- Church: Catholic Church
- See: Patriarch of Venice
- Appointed: 11 June 1725
- Term ended: 14 November 1734
- Predecessor: Piero Barbarigo
- Successor: Francesco Antonio Correr
- Other post: Bishop of Verona

Orders
- Consecration: 6 February 1701 (Bishop) by Cardinal Daniello Marco Delfino

Personal details
- Born: 1 April 1663 Venezia
- Died: 14 November 1734 (aged 71) Campagnola, Brugine
- Buried: San Pietro di Castello in Venice

Bartolomeo (Bortolo) Gradenigo, better known as Marco Gradenigo, (Latin: Marcus Gradonicus; 1663 – 1734) was Bishop of Verona from 1714 to 1725 and later Patriarch of Venice up to his death.

== Early life ==
He was born in Venice on 1 April 1663, second son of Gerolamo di Daniele to the noble family of Gradenigo di Rio Marin. Second of seven sons all named Bortolo, his nickname Marco became widely used. Furthermore, he was the nephew, on his paternal side, of Marco Gradenigo and Gerolamo Gradenigo, both patriarchs of Aquileia and also of Bartolomeo Gradenigo, bishop of Treviso and Brescia.

Because he was noble, on 23 November 1683 he was admitted to the Great Council of Venice. On 30 June 1697 he was elected provveditore alle Pompe (a minor public office, aimed to limit the use of precious and luxury objects and their display). On December of the same year he became Savio di Terraferma and on 10 August 1698 he was elected mayor of Verona.

== Ecclesiastic career ==
On 22 August 1699 he was appointed coadjutor bishop of the patriarch of Aquileia with right of succession. This agreement was reached between the Venetian Senate and the then patriarch Dionisio Dolfin, who had just taken office. The bulls of investiture remained concealed, so as to avoid negative repercussions from Emperor Leopold, who ruled about the half of the territories of the Patriarchate and wanted to appoint one of his subjects. He received the episcopal consecration as titular bishop of Titiopolis in Rome on 6 February 1701 by the hands of Cardinal Daniello Marco Delfino.

On 19 November 1714 Marco Gradenigo was appointed bishop of Verona and handed over the position of coadjutor of the patriarch of Aquileia to Daniele Dolfin, nephew of Dionisio. In Verona, both the frugality of his behavior and his expenses and the charity towards the poor of the diocese were immediately known. Furthermore, he always tried to serve the interests of the Republic of Venice, which was appreciated by that government.

Upon the death of the patriarch of Venice Pietro Barbarigo, he was chosen on 5 May 1725 by the Venetian Senate as the new patriarch with an almost unanimous plebiscite (186 votes in favor against only 3 votes against). He had to leave Verona immediately, but was allowed to retain certain income from Verona for the rest of his life. Having received papal confirmation on 3 September, Marco Gradenigo took office as the new patriarch of Venice on 13 September 1725. The celebration of Patriarch Gradenigo's inauguration lasted three days: it consisted of a procession, church services, a gondola ride, a street party. However, his office proceeded in austerity and cost control. Gradenigo was known for being thrifty. He venerated the first Patriarch of Venice Saint Lorenzo Giustiniani.

He had the floor of his cathedral San Pietro di Castello in Venice paved with marble in white and red colors, and he ordered to install in the nave of that cathedral what was believed to be the throne of Saint Peter. He died in his villa in Campagnola, a village in the municipality of Brugine near Padua, on 14 November 1734, and he was buried in the cathedral of San Pietro di Castello in the common grave of the canons of the cathedral.
