= Giovanni Emo =

Giovanni Emo can refer to:

- Giovanni Emo (1419–1483), Venetian statesman and commander
- Giovanni Emo (bishop) (1565–1622), bishop of Bergamo
