= Vittore Capello =

Most Reverend Vittore Capello
- Titular Bishop of Famagusta
- Church: Catholic Church
- In office: 1633–1648
- Predecessor: Germanicus Mantica
- Successor: Gerolamo Gradenigo

Orders
- Consecration: 31 Jul 1633 by Bernardino Spada

Personal details
- Born: 1588 Venice, Italy
- Died: 1648 (age 60)

Vittore Capello, C.R.S. (1588–1648) was a Roman Catholic prelate who served as Titular Bishop of Famagusta (1633–1648).

== Biography ==
Vittore Capello was born in 1588 in Venice, Italy and ordained a priest in the Ordo Clericorum Regularium a Somascha. On 20 Jun 1633, he was appointed during the papacy of Pope Urban VIII as Titular Bishop of Famagusta. On 31 Jul 1633, he was consecrated bishop by Bernardino Spada, Cardinal-Priest of Santo Stefano al Monte Celio, with Ettore Diotallevi, Bishop of Sant'Agata de' Goti, and Alessandro Filonardi, Bishop of Aquino, serving as co-consecrators. He remained as Titular Bishop of Famagusta until his death in 1648.

Catholic Church titles
Preceded by Germanicus Mantica	Titular Bishop of Famagusta; 1633–1648	Succeeded by Gerolamo Gradenigo
