= Giorgio Cornaro (cardinal) =

His Eminence Giorgio Cornaro
- Cardinal-Priest of Santi XII Apostoli; Archbishop (Personal Title) of Padua
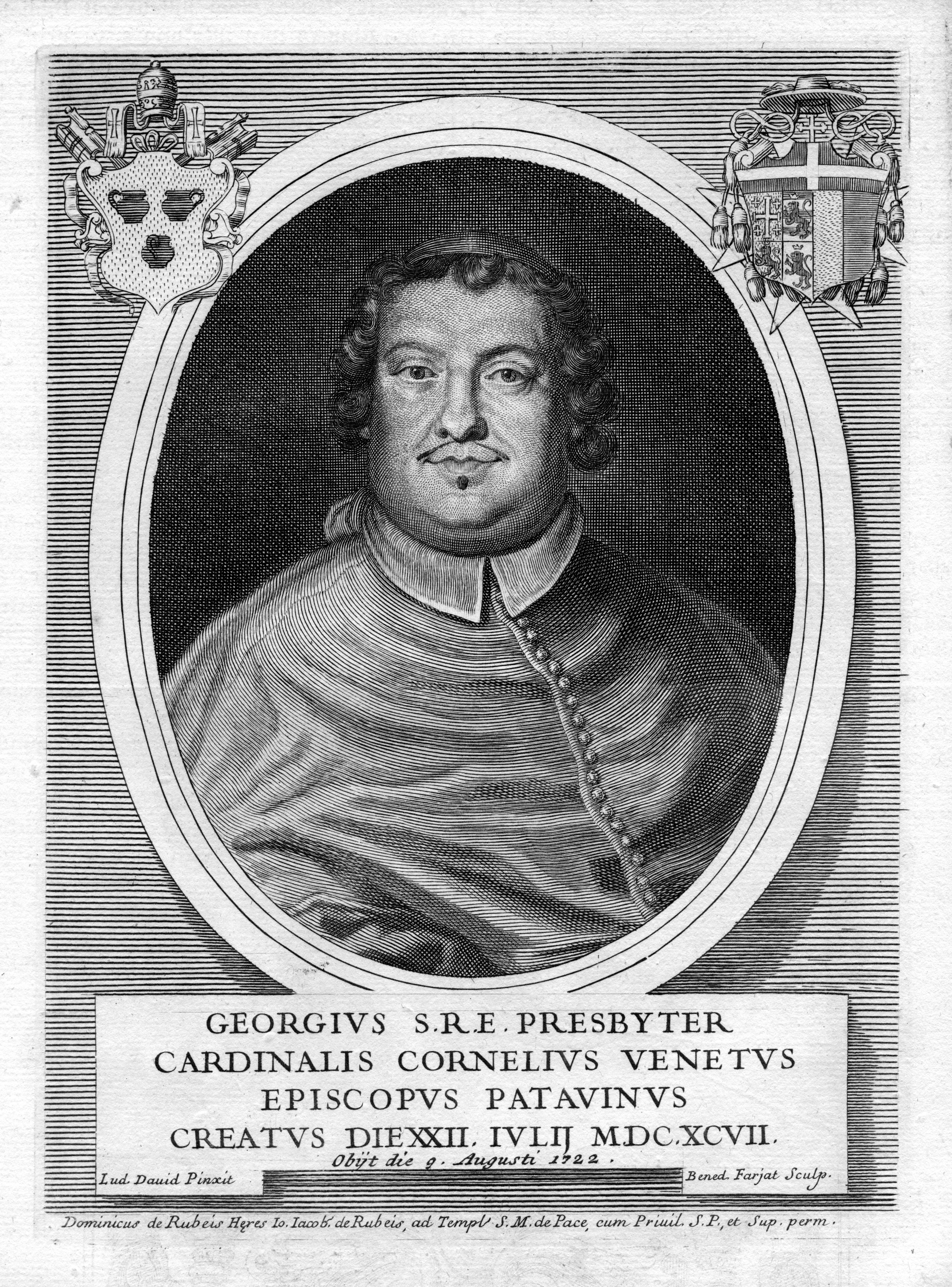
- Church: Catholic Church

Orders
- Consecration: 11 May 1692 by Giambattista Rubini

Personal details
- Born: 1 Aug 1658 Venice, Italy
- Died: 10 Aug 1722 (age 64) Padua, Italy

Giorgio Cornaro or Giorgio Corner (1658–1722) was a Roman Catholic cardinal and member of the Cornaro family.

== Biography ==
On 11 May 1692, he was consecrated bishop by Giambattista Rubini, Bishop of Vicenza, with Lorenzo Trotti, Bishop of Pavia, and Gregorio Giuseppe Gaetani de Aragonia, Titular Archbishop of Neocaesarea in Ponto, serving as co-consecrators.

== Episcopal succession ==
While bishop, he was the principal consecrator of:

- Denis Delfino (patriarch) (Dionisio Dolfin), Titular Bishop of Lorea and Coadjutor Patriarch of Aquileia (1698);
- Angelo Maria Carlini, Titular Archbishop of Corinthus (1703);
- Pietro Barbarigo, Patriarch of Venice (1706); and
- Sergio Pola, Titular Bishop of Famagusta (1706).

Catholic Church titles
Preceded by Francesco Niccolini	Titular Archbishop of Rhodus; 1692–1697	Succeeded by Giulio Piazza
Preceded by Sebastiano Antonio Tanara	Apostolic Nuncio to Portugal; 1692–1697	Succeeded by Michelangelo dei Conti
Preceded by Gregorio Giovanni Gasparo Barbarigo	Archbishop (Personal Title) of Padua; 1697–1722	Succeeded by Giovanni Francesco Barbarigo
Preceded by Lorenzo Brancati di Lauria	Cardinal-Priest of Santi XII Apostoli; 1698–1722	Succeeded by Benedetto Caietano Giuseppe Odescalchi-Erba
