= Marco Cornaro (cardinal) =

Italian Roman Catholic cardinal and bishop

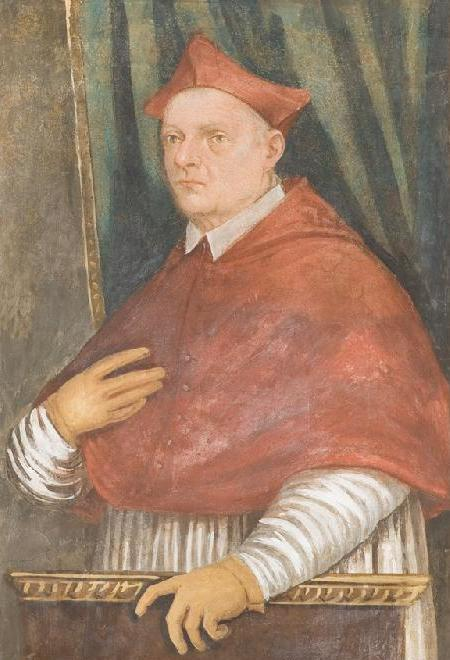
Cardinal Marco Corner

Coat of arms of Cardinal Marco Cornaro

Marco Cornaro (1482 – 24 July 1524), also known as Cardinal Cornaro and Cardinal Cornelius, was an Italian Roman Catholic cardinal and bishop.

== Biography ==
A member of the House of Cornaro, Marco Cornaro was born in Venice in 1482, the son of Giorgio Cornaro and Elisabetta Morosini. He was the nephew of Catherine Cornaro, Queen of Cyprus. He was ordained as a priest by Pope Clement VII. His older brother Francesco Cornaro was also a cardinal. Early in his life, Marco Cornaro was a protonotary apostolic.

Pope Alexander VI made Cornaro a cardinal deacon in the consistory of 28 September 1500. He received the deaconry of Santa Maria in Campitelli on 5 October 1500.

He arrived in Rome on 1 September 1503 and then participated in both the papal conclave of September 1503 that elected Pope Pius III, and the papal conclave of October 1503 that elected Pope Julius II.

On 29 November 1503 he became the apostolic administrator of the see of Verona, occupying the post to his death. He was elected Bishop of Famagusta on 11 December 1503; he resigned the see on 1 July 1504. In July 1506, he was named titular Latin Patriarch of Constantinople, holding the see until 30 October 1507, and then again from 11 June 1521 until his death. In January 1511, he accompanied Pope Julius II during the siege of Mirandola. The Pope then named him papal legate to the Patrimony of Saint Peter, holding the position until 1514. He was also involved in the negotiations to reconcile the Republic of Venice with Pope Julius II.

He participated in the papal conclave of 1513 that elected Pope Leo X. On 19 March 1513 he opted for the deaconry of Santa Maria in Via Lata.

During the Fifth Council of the Lateran, he served on the Commission of Reform.

He became a canon of Treviso Cathedral on 23 April 1513. On 11 December 1513 he became chancellor of the metropolitan see of Nicosia. On 4 April 1514, he was elected Bishop of Nemosia; he resigned the see on 22 March 1516. On 9 March 1517 he became Bishop of Padua, occupying that see until his death. On 4 November 1517 he became a member of the commission of cardinals on war with the Ottoman Empire. He became administrator of the see of Nardò and legate to the Patrimony of Saint Peter on 24 January 1519, holding the office until 20 February 1521.

He became cardinal protodeacon on 20 December 1520. He participated in the papal conclave of 1521–1522 that elected Pope Adrian VI. As cardinal protodeacon, he announced Adrian VI's election to the people of Rome on 9 January 1522 and crowned the Pope in the papal coronation held in St. Peter's Basilica on 31 January 1522.

He participated in the papal conclave of 1523 that elected Pope Clement VII. As cardinal protodeacon, he crowned the new pope on 26 November 1523. Cardinal Cornaro was one of three cardinals whom the new Pope named to inquire about the Lutherans.

On 14 December 1523 he opted for the order of cardinal priests and the titular church of San Marco. On 20 May 1524 he opted for the order of cardinal bishops and the Suburbicarian Diocese of Albano. He opted for the Suburbicarian Diocese of Palestrina on 15 June 1524.

He died in Venice on 24 July 1524. He was initially buried in the Church of San Giorgio Maggiore. In 1570, his remains, along with those of the other cardinals of his family, were transferred to St Mark's Basilica.

Catholic Church titles
Preceded by Giovanni Battista Zeno	Cardinal-Deacon of Santa Maria in Portico; 1500–1513	Succeeded by Bernardo Dovizi da Bibbiena
Preceded by Giovanni Michiel	Administrator of Verona; 1503–1524	Succeeded by Giovanni Matteo Giberti
Preceded by Alvise Cippico	Bishop of Famagusta; 1503–1504	Succeeded by Mattia Ugoni
Preceded by Francisco Lloris y de Borja	Titular Patriarch of Constantinople; 1506–1507 (1st term)	Succeeded by Tamás Bakócz
Preceded by Pedro Luis de Borja Lanzol de Romaní	Cardinal-Deacon of Santa Maria in Via Lata; 1513–1523	Succeeded by Alessandro Cesarini (seniore)
Preceded by Nicola Dolci	Bishop of Nemosia; 1514–1516	Succeeded by Paolo Borgasio
Preceded by Sisto Gara della Rovere	Bishop of Padua; 1517–1524	Succeeded by Francesco Pisani
Preceded by Luigi d'Aragona	Administrator of Nardò; 1519–1521	Succeeded by Giacomo Antonio Acquaviva
Preceded by Franciotto Orsini	Archpriest of the Basilica di San Pietro in Vaticano; 1520–1524	Succeeded by Francesco Cornaro (seniore)
Preceded by Tamás Bakócz	Titular Patriarch of Constantinople; 1521–1524 (2nd term)	Succeeded by Egidio da Viterbo
Preceded by Domenico Grimani	Cardinal-Priest of San Marco; 1523	Succeeded by Francesco Pisani
Preceded by Pietro de Accolti de Aretio	Cardinal-Bishop of Albano; 1524	Succeeded by Lorenzo Pucci
Preceded by Pietro de Accolti de Aretio	Cardinal-Bishop of Palestrina; 1524	Succeeded by Lorenzo Pucci
