= Annibale Grassi =

Most Reverend Annibale Grassi
- Apostolic Nuncio to Spain; Bishop Emeritus of Faenza
- Church: Catholic Church
- In office: 1588–1590
- Predecessor: Cesare Speciano
- Successor: Camillo Caetani
- Previous post: Bishop of Faenza (1575–1585)

Personal details
- Born: 1537 Bologna, Italy
- Died: 24 June 1590 (age 53)

Annibale Grassi (1537–1590) was a Roman Catholic prelate who served as Apostolic Nuncio to Spain (1588–1590) and Bishop of Faenza (1575–1585).

== Biography ==
Annibale Grassi was born in Bologna, Italy in 1537, the son of Senator Gian Antonio Grassi and Bianca Grati. On 18 May 1553, at the age of sixteen, he was granted the degree of Doctor in utroque iure by the University of Bologna. He was granted a chair in Civil Law at the university, where he taught for fifteen years.

He was summoned to Rome, where he was appointed Auditor [luogotenente] of Cardinal Guido Ascanio Sforza, who was Chamberlain [Camerlengo] of the Apostolic Camera (Finance Ministry) of the Holy Roman Church. Pope Pius V (1566–1572) named him Referendary of the Two Signatures. He was a member of the staff of Cardinal Michele Bonelli, the Pope's nephew, when he served as Legate to the Kings of Spain, Portugal, and France, in 1571 and 1572. Pope Gregory XIII, a fellow Bolognese, named Annibale a Consultor of the Holy Office of the Inquisition, and Auditor Contradictorum

In a letter of 24 June 1575, Pope Gregory appointed Annibale Grassi to the recently vacated post of Rector of the Studium Generale Almae Urbis (the Sapienza), an office to be held for life. The Pope had plans for Grassi's continued service, and therefore he allowed him to have a coadjutor in the office of Rector, Grassi's own brother Cesare, who was Provost of the Cathedral Chapter of Bologna. Cesare Grassi resigned the post in 1581, due to ill health.

In the Consistory of 23 July 1575, Annibale Grassi was appointed Bishop of Faenza by Pope Gregory XIII (1572–1585). He took possession of the diocese through his Procurator, Canon Tommaso Pasi. On 13 December 1575, he made his solemn entry into his diocese. In 1576, to carry forward his predecessor's initiative, he obtained subsidies both from the city government and the Cathedral Chapter for the erection of a seminary. In May 1577, the Bishop united fifteen benefices to provide the seminary with a regular income.

Bishop Grassi's patron, Cardinal Sforza, who had been serving as Legate of the Marches, died on 16 May 1581, and Cardinal Guido Ferreri was appointed to succeed him. Bishop Grassi was named Vice-Legate. Before he left Faenza, however, he presided over the consecration of the new cathedral, on 15 October 1581. On 12 May 1582, the Vice-Legate had a seat of honor at the provincial synod of Ravenna. On 18 March 1585, Bishop Grassi resigned the diocese of Faenza in favor of his nephew, Gian Antonio Grassi.

Annibale returned to Rome, where the new pope, Sixtus V, named him Consultor at the Holy Office (Inquisition). In 1586, he was appointed Cleric of the Apostolic Camera, and Apostolic Visitor to Piceno.

On 27 August 1588, he was appointed Apostolic Nuncio to Spain by Pope Sixtus. He died in Madrid, where he was still serving as Nuncio, on 24 June 1590. It is said that he was cardinal-elect at the time of his death, that is to say that he would be named a cardinal at the next consistory. A red hat was a frequent reward for a successful nunciature. But Pope Sixtus died on 27 August 1590.

=== Works ===
Bishop Grassi was the author of:

- De iurisdictione universali summi Pontificis in temporalibus
- De iurisdictione ecclesiastica episcoporum et ordinariorum

=== Episcopal consecrations ===
While bishop, he was the principal co-consecrator of:

- Lattanzio Lattanzi, Bishop of Pistoia (1576);
- Pietro Ridolfi (bishop), Bishop of Venosa (1587); and
- Claudio Marescotti, Bishop of Strongoli (1587).

== Bibliography ==
- Azzurrini, Bernardino (1905). Antonio Messeri (ed.). Chronica breviora aliaque monumenta Faventina a Bernardino Azzurrinio collecta. Rerum Italicarum Scriptores, XXVIII, parte iii (in Latin and Italian). Tipi della casa editrice S. Lapi. pp. 65–66.
- Renazzi, Filippo Maria (1804). Storia dell'Universita degli studi di Roma, detta comunemente la Sapienza (in Italian). Vol. II. Roma: Pagliarini. pp. 157–159, 269–271.

Catholic Church titles
Preceded by Giovanni Battista Sighicelli	Bishop of Faenza; 1575–1585	Succeeded by Gian Antonio Grassi
Preceded by Cesare Speciano	Apostolic Nuncio to Spain; 1588–1590	Succeeded by Camillo Caetani
