= Teodoro Pio =

Italian Roman Catholic prelate

Most Reverend Teodoro Pio
- Bishop of Faenza
- Church: Catholic Church
- Diocese: Diocese of Faenza
- In office: 1544–1561
- Predecessor: Rodolfo Pio
- Successor: Giovanni Battista Sighicelli

Orders
- Consecration: 10 May 1545 by Rodolfo Pio

Personal details
- Died: November 1561 Faenza, Italy

Teodoro Pio (died 1561) was a Roman Catholic prelate who served as Bishop of Faenza (1544–1561).

== Biography ==
On 10 October 1544, Teodoro Pio was appointed during the papacy of Pope Paul III as Bishop of Faenza. On 10 May 1545, he was consecrated bishop by Rodolfo Pio, Cardinal-Priest of Santa Maria in Trastevere, with Bernardino de Soria, Bishop of Venafro, and Filippo Bona, Bishop of Famagusta, serving as co-consecrators. He served as Bishop of Faenza until his death in November 1561.

== External links and additional sources ==
- Cheney, David M. "Diocese of Faenza-Modigliana". Catholic-Hierarchy.org. (for Chronology of Bishops) ^{[self-published]}
- Chow, Gabriel. "Diocese of Faenza-Modigliana (Italy)". GCatholic.org. (for Chronology of Bishops) ^{[self-published]}

Catholic Church titles
| Preceded by Rodolfo Pio | Bishop of Faenza; 1544–1561 | Succeeded by Giovanni Battista Sighicelli |
