= Sergio Pola =

- Titular Bishop of Famagusta
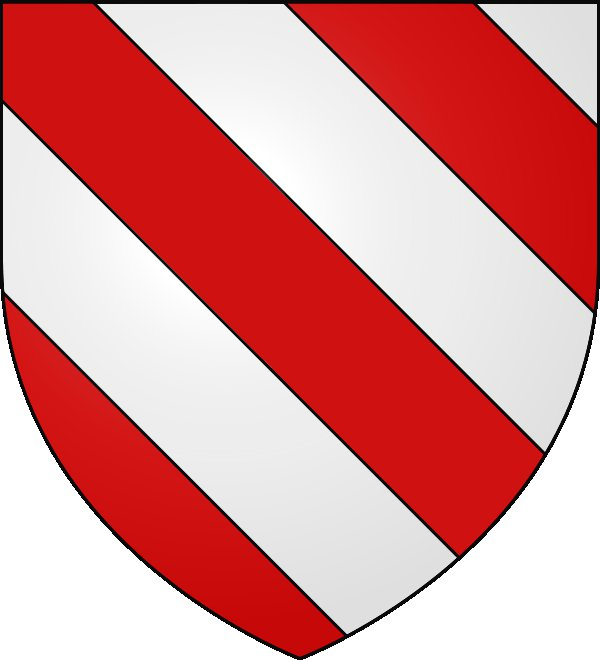
- Coat of arms of the House of Pola
- Church: Catholic Church
- See: Bishop of Famagusta
- Appointed: 19 July 1706
- Term ended: 9 February 1748
- Predecessor: Vincenzo Bonifacio
- Successor: Gerolamo Gradenigo

Orders
- Consecration: 21 November 1706 (Bishop) by Cardinal Giorgio Cornaro

Personal details
- Born: 1 November 1674 Treviso, Venetian Republic
- Died: 9 February 1748 (aged 73) Treviso, Venetian Republic
- Buried: Church of Santa Caterina, Treviso

Sergio Pola (1674 – 1748) was an Italian titular bishop of the diocese of Famagusta from 1706 until his death.

== Life ==
Sergio Pola was born in Treviso, Venetian Republic, on 1 November 1674, member of the House of Pola. On 23 July 1695 he became Canon of the Padua Cathedral, a position he held till 1706. In 1702 he refused the appointment as Bishop of Adria.

He was appointed titular bishop of Famagusta on 19 July 1706. He received the episcopal consecration in the monastic church of Beata Elena in Padua on 21 November 1706 by the hands of the Cardinal Giorgio Cornaro.

Sergio Pola was a member of the team, which prepared the background papers for the beatification of cardinal Gregorio Barbarigo. From 1711 to his death, he was also commendatory abbot of Abbey of Santa Maria, Follina.

Sergio Pola died on 9 February 1748 in Treviso, and he was buried in the Church of Santa Caterina.
