= Paolo Borgasio =

- Bishop of Nemosia
- Church: Catholic Church
- See: Roman Catholic Diocese of Nemosia
- Appointed: 22 March 1516
- Term ended: 14 July 1539
- Predecessor: Marco Cornaro
- Successor: Andrea Zantani

Orders
- Consecration: 7 October 1520 (Bishop) by Antonio Contarini Patriarch of Venice

Personal details
- Born: 1466 Feltre
- Died: 1541 (aged 74–75) Venezia

Paolo Borgasio (Latin: Paulus Borgasius 1466–1541) was Bishop of Nemosia (Limosol) from 1516 to 1539.

== Life ==
Paolo Borgasio was born in 1466 in Feltre to a family originally from Limassol. He studied in Padua and Bologna, graduating in utroque iure. He then went to Venice to practice the profession of lawyer, addressing himself to the ecclesiastical courts.

He then began his ecclesiastical career. He was initially a canon and archdeacon of the cathedral of Feltre, then entered into the good graces of the cardinal and patriarch of Aquileia Domenico Grimani (of whom he was vicar general). He then served Cardinal Marco Cornaro and followed him to Rome where he began to work in the Roman Curia.

Having become referendary of the Tribunals of the Apostolic Signature and domestic prelate of the pope, Cardinal Cornaro ceded the Diocese of Limassol (Nemosia) to him on 22 March 1516.

Borgasio served Cardinal Cornaro acting as governor of Viterbo, but in December 1519 his career was interrupted when the Cornaro replaced him with the primicerio of San Marco Girolamo Barbarigo and Borgasio received no other assignments: the reasons for this are unknown. Borgasio had to leave the Roman Curia to return to Venice, where he entered the governmental circles of the Republic of Venice becoming one of its trusted prelates. He received his episcopal consecration in the cathedral of San Pietro di Castello on 7 October 1520 by the Patriarch of Venice Antonio Contarini.

In May 1521 the apostolic nuncio, with the consent of the government, appointed him inquisitor to deal with some cases of witchcraft that had occurred in the Brescia region. in September he returned to Venice to report to the Venetian Senate. To compensate for his efforts, he was granted exemption from his diocese's tithes. This success paved the way for him to other assignments. In September 1523, together with Marco Antonio Regino, he was appointed collector of the Venetian tithes granted by Pope Adrian VI. The following December they presented the report of their work to the Senate, during which they had managed, not without difficulty, to raise significant sums.

The government also used him as a consultant and judge in benefits and other matters, and in these offices he maintained a cautious attitude. He acted with a tolerant attitude, such as in the dispute that broke out in 1527 when the Patriarch of Venice tried to stop the Greeks in Venice from opening a new church for their celebrations. In 1530 Borgasio was given the task of judging the Franciscan Girolamo Galateo, imprisoned because he was accused of spreading Lutheran doctrines in Padua. Borgasio ordered Galateo to be released once he repented. Later Galateo returned to his preaching which attracted the attention of the bishop of Chieti Gian Piero Carafa (future Pope Paul IV), who reported the case to Pope Clement VII hoping for repressive action in the territories of the Republic of Venice, considered to be too tolerant in the face of the spread of heresy. Because of the Apostolic Nuncio Altobello Averoldi, Carafa obtained from the Pope a brief of appointment to judge the Galateo: so the Venetians arrested the friar again and repealed the mild sentence of Borgasio.

Borgasio, now advanced in years, gradually withdrew into private life. In 1530 he accepted the task of running the diocese of Padua in place of the archbishop Francesco Pisani. On 14 July 1539 he resigned as bishop of Limassol and moved to Feltre to devote himself to studies.

Paolo Borgasio died in Venice in 1541, where he was on business. His funeral was held in the church of Sant'Agnese, with the funeral oration recited by the scholar Giovanni Battista Egnazio. He was buried in the nearby church used by the Jesuits.

== Works ==
His essay on canon law Tractatus de irregularitatibus, et impedimentis ordinum, officiorum, et beneficiorum ecclesiasticorum, et censuris ecclesiasticis, et dispensationibus super eis... was posthumously published in 1574 in Venice.
