= Caesarius of Alagno =

Caesarius of Alagno (died 1263) was a Roman Catholic priest, bishop and royal counsellor. He served as an archdeacon in the cathedral of Sant'Andrea in his hometown of Amalfi before moving to Salerno, where he stayed with a sister before settling in Rome. In 1211 he was elected bishop of Famagusta in the Kingdom of Cyprus. In 1221, 1224 and 1225 he made trips to Rome as the procurator of Queen Alice of Cyprus. In 1225 Pope Honorius III promoted him to the archbishopric of Salerno, which had been vacant since 1221. Along with five other Sicilian bishops appointed by Honorius, he was at first unable to occupy his see on account of the opposition of the Holy Roman Emperor Frederick II.

Caesarius later became an avid Ghibelline (imperialist), a familiaris and counsellor of Frederick's illegitimate son King Manfred of Sicily. From Manfred he obtained the right to hold an eight-day market at Salerno during the feast of Saint Matthew, the city's patron. He augmented the archdiocese's possessions with the district of Battipaglia (confirmed by Manfred) and the castle of Olevano (confirmed by Frederick). In January 1260 he altered the customary food allowance of the cathedral canons of Salerno, threatening violators with excommunication. He died in 1263 and was buried in the cathedral of Amalfi. His tomb lies beside the main entrance, under a marble arch.
