= Giovanni Battista Sighicelli =

Italian Roman Catholic prelate

Most Reverend Giovanni Battista Sighicelli
- Bishop of Faenza
- Church: Catholic Church
- Diocese: Diocese of Faenza
- In office: 1562–1575
- Predecessor: Teodoro Pio
- Successor: Annibale Grassi

Personal details
- Born: San Giovanni in Persiceto, Italy
- Died: 12 July 1575 Faenza, Italy

Giovanni Battista Sighicelli (died 1575) was a Roman Catholic prelate who served as Bishop of Faenza (1562–1575).

On 18 March 1562, Giovanni Battista Sighicelli was appointed during the papacy of Pope Pius IV as Bishop of Faenza. Native of San Giovanni in Persiceto, he served as Bishop of Faenza until his death on 12 July 1575.

== External links and additional sources ==
- Cheney, David M. "Diocese of Faenza-Modigliana". Catholic-Hierarchy.org. (for Chronology of Bishops) ^{[self-published]}
- Chow, Gabriel. "Diocese of Faenza-Modigliana (Italy)". GCatholic.org. (for Chronology of Bishops) ^{[self-published]}

Catholic Church titles
Preceded by Teodoro Pio	Bishop of Faenza; 1562–1575	Succeeded by Annibale Grassi
