= Giovanni Antonio Serbelloni =

Italian Cardinal

His Eminence Giovanni Antonio Serbelloni
- Cardinal, Bishop of Ostia
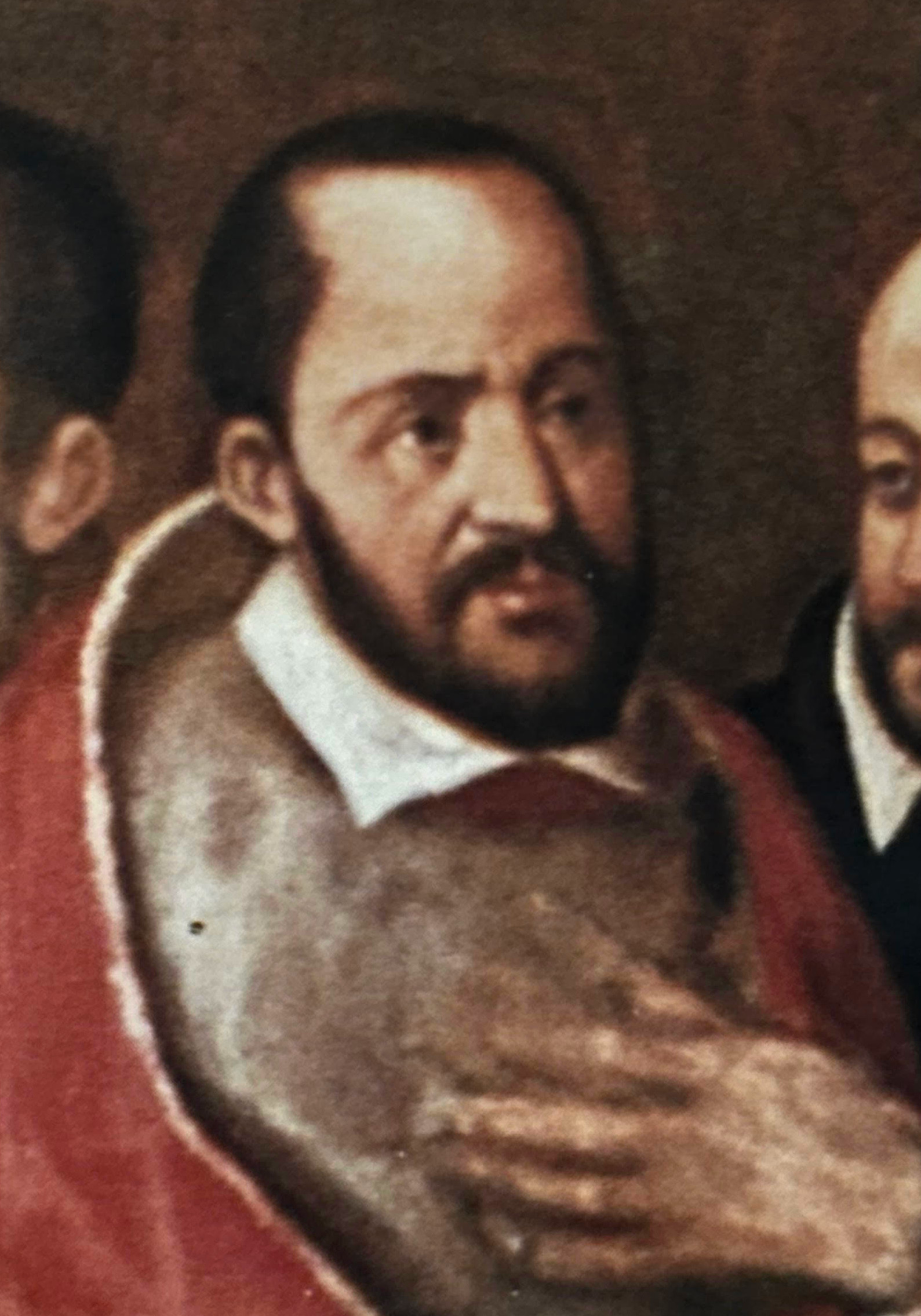
- Church: Catholic Church
- See: Ostia

Orders
- Consecration: 25 Aug 1557 (Bishop) by Giovanni Angelo Medici
- Created cardinal: 31 January 1560 by Pope Pius IV

Personal details
- Born: 1519 Milan, Duchy of Milan
- Died: 18 April 1591 (aged 71–72) Rome, Papal States
- Buried: Santa Maria degli Angeli, Roma

Giovanni Antonio Serbelloni (also known as Gian Antonio, Gianantonio; 1519–1591) was an Italian Cardinal.

== Life ==
Giovanni Antonio Serbelloni was born in Milan in 1519 to a prominent family. He was the brother of Gabrio (condottiero and general) and Giovan Battista (castellan of Castel Sant'Angelo and later Bishop of Cassano all' Ionio). In 1541 in Milan he received the tonsure and the four minor orders, thus becoming a cleric.

His cousin Cardinal Giovanni Angelo Medici renounced in 1557 the bishopric of Foligno in his favour. He was so elected bishop of Foligno on 7 May 1557, and consecrated bishop on 25 August of that year by the Cardinal Medici. In preparation to this appointment he was ordained deacon on 28 March and priest on 5 April of that year.

A turning point in the life of Giovanni Antonio Serbelloni was the elevation of his cousin Giovanni Angelo Medici to the papacy as Pope Pius IV in December 1559. As in use in such age, the Pope trusted for the important political affairs only on his own relatives: this on 31 January 1560, the Pope appointed him Cardinal Priest of San Giorgio in Velabro. In the same consistory, also Charles Borromeo, nephew of the Pope, was made cardinal.

Living in Rome near the Pope, he was appointed bishop of Novara on 13 March 1560 and Legate (i.e. governor) of Camerino in 26 April 1560. On 7 December 1563 he consecrated bishop St. Charles Borromeo.

After the death of Pius IV in 1565, he was appointed governor of Città della Pieve in place of Camerino, an office he held till 1570. He visited his diocese, Novara, only in 1568, when he held a diocesan synod, remaining for most of the time in Rome. He resigned this diocese in 1574.

In his life he changed many cardinal titles before being appointed Cardinal bishop: on 17 May 1565 he was appointed Cardinal-priest of Santa Maria degli Angeli, a church he helped to build and where he and Pope Pius IV were buried; on 12 April 1570 he passed to San Pietro in Vincoli, on 9 June 1570 to San Clemente, on 3 July 1570 to Sant'Angelo in Pescheria, on 31 July 1577 to Santa Maria in Trastevere. However he remained always known as Cardinal of San Giorgio, his first cardinal appointment.

In the last years of his life he rose in rank among the Cardinal-bishops: was appointed bishop of Sabina on 3 July 1578, bishop of Palestrina on 5 October 1578, bishop of Frascati on 4 March 1583, bishop of Porto e Santa Rufina on 11 Dec 1587, and finally bishop of Ostia and Dean of the College of Cardinals on 2 March 1589.

Giovanni Antonio Serbelloni died in Rome on 18 March 1591 and was buried in Santa Maria degli Angeli. At his death, an overnight bag near his bed contained 100 thousand golden scudi and titles for another 400 thousand.

== Sources ==
- Giannini, Massimo Carlo, "Serbelloni, Giovanni Antonio," (in Italian), in: Dizionario Biografico degli Italiani (2018).

Catholic Church titles
Preceded by Giovanni Angelo Medici	Bishop of Foligno; 1557–1560	Succeeded by Clemente d'Olera
Preceded by Giovanni Gerolamo Morone	Bishop of Novara; 1560–1574	Succeeded by Romolo Archinto
Preceded by Giacomo Savelli	Cardinal-bishop of Sabina; 1578	Succeeded by Antoine Perrenot de Granvelle
Preceded by Giulio della Rovere	Cardinal-bishop of Palestrina; 1578–1583	Succeeded by Giovanni Francesco Gambara
Preceded by Giacomo Savelli	Cardinal-bishop of Frascati; 1583–1587	Succeeded by Alfonso Gesualdo
Preceded by Giacomo Savelli	Cardinal-bishop of Porto; 1587–1589	Succeeded by Alfonso Gesualdo
Preceded by Alessandro Farnese	Cardinal-bishop of Ostia; 1589–1591	Succeeded by Alfonso Gesualdo
Preceded by Alessandro Farnese	Dean of the College of Cardinals; 1589–1591	Succeeded by Alfonso Gesualdo
