= Titiopolis =

Town of ancient Cilicia

Coordinates: 36°05′38″N 32°48′39″E

Titiopolis or Titioupolis (Greek: Τιτιούπολις) was a town of ancient Cilicia and later in the Roman province of Isauria.

== Name and location ==
Some refer to the town by the name Titopolis, but a coin minted there in the time of Emperor Hadrian bears on the reverse the word ΤΙΤΙΟΠΟΛΙΤΩΝ (Of the inhabitants of Titiopolis). Other sources cited in the presentation about that coin to the Royal Numismatic Society give the same form. These concern the names of bishops of Titiopolis (considered below) and also the information given by the Hieroclis Synecdemus, by George of Cyprus, and by Constantine Porphyrogenitus, according to which Titiopolis was one of the cities of the Isaurian Decapolis. The editors of the Barrington Atlas of the Greek and Roman World conjecture that the old Isaurian bishopric (and, now, titular see) of Cardabunta or Kardabounda may be identified with the town.

The ruins of Titiopolis lie about 4 kilometres north-north-west of Anamur.

== Ecclesiastical History ==
=== Bishopric ===
Titiopolis was also the seat of an ancient bishopric.

Le Quien mentions three bishops of Titiopolis:

- Artemius at the Council of Constantinople in 381;
- Mompraeus at the Council of Chalcedon in 451;
- Domitius at the Trullan Council in 692.

The see of Titiopolis is mentioned in the 6th century Notitia episcopatuum of Antioch and, after Isauria was annexed to the Patriarchate of Constantinople in about 732, in the Notitia episcopatuum of that church and in that of Leo the Wise in about 900 and that of Constantine Porphyrogenitus in about 940.

The last mention of Titiopolis as a residential see is by William of Tyre in the late 12th century. He speaks of it as one of the 24 suffragan sees of Seleucia in Isauria.

The see of Titiopolis is now included in the Catholic Church's list of titular sees. It is currently vacant.

=== Titular bishops ===
- Jean de Karlestadt, O.S.A., appointed 1389
- Gomez de Rocha, O.S.B., appointed 11 July 1488
- Francisco, O.S.B., appointed 20 July 1498
- Fr. Gonçalo de Amorim, O.P., appointed 19 June 1518, appointed titular Bishop of Hierapolis 14 June 1518
- Jean Parisol, O.P., appointed 26 October 1519
- Gaspar de Vasos, appointed 7 November 1530
- Fr. Luís da Silva Teles, O.SS.T., appointed 1 July 1671; appointed Bishop of Lamego 8 March 1677
- Bl. Niels Stensen, appointed 13 September 1677; died 5 December 1686
- Marco Gradenigo, appointed 22 August 1699; appointed Bishop of Verona 19 November 1714
- Charles-Marin Labbé, M.E.P., appointed 12 September 1703; died 24 March 1723
- Angel Benito, O.S.B., appointed 4 March 1720
- Gabriel Zerdahely, appointed 11 December 1780; confirmed as Bishop of Banská Bystrica 22 December 1800
- Ferenc Miklósy, appointed 20 July 1801; confirmed as Bishop of Oradea Mare (also known as Gran Varadino, Nagyvárad) 20 June 1803
- Vicente Alexandre de Tovar, appointed 20 June 1803; died 8 October 1808
- Manuel del Villar, appointed 4 September 1815; appointed Bishop of Lérida 23 September 1816
- Nicolò Gatto, appointed 21 February 1820; confirmed as Bishop of Patti 17 November 1823
- Giorgio Papas (Papasian), appointed 6 December 1826; died 2 June 1839
- Francis Kelly, appointed 3 August 1849; succeeded as Bishop of Derry 18 June 1864
- John Cameron, appointed 11 March 1870; succeeded as Bishop of Arichat (now Antigonish), Nova Scotia 17 July 1877
- Valentin Garnier, S.J., appointed 21 January 1879; died 14 August 1898
- Juan José Laguarda y Fenollera, appointed 19 June 1899; appointed Bishop of Urgell 9 June 1902
- Vilmos Batthyány, appointed 3 January 1902; succeeded as Bishop of Nitra 18 March 1911
- Domenico Raffaele Francesco Marengo, O.P., appointed 8 March 1904; succeeded as Archbishop of İzmir 25 July 1904
- Edward Joseph Hanna, appointed 22 October 1912; appointed Archbishop of San Francisco 1 June 1915
- Pierre Verdier, appointed 22 March 1917; died 21 May 1924
- Joseph Alfred Langlois, appointed 14 July 1924; appointed Bishop of Valleyfield, Québec 10 July 1926
- Pedro Francisco Luna Pachón, O.F.M., appointed 17 Jul 1926; died 15 March 1967
