= Serafino Fortibraccia =

Roman Catholic prelate and Bishop of Nemosia from 1569 to 1571

The Most Reverend Serafino Fortibraccia
- Bishop of Nemosia
- Church: Catholic Church
- Diocese: Diocese of Nemosia
- In office: 1569–1571
- Predecessor: Andrea Mocenigo
- Successor: None

Orders
- Consecration: 13 February 1569 by Giulio Antonio Santorio

Personal details
- Died: 1571 Famagusta, Cyprus

Serafino Fortibraccia, O.P. (died 1571) was a Roman Catholic prelate who served as Bishop of Nemosia (1569–1571).

== Biography ==
Serafino Fortibraccia was ordained a bishop in the Order of Preachers. On 24 January 1569, he was appointed during the papacy of Pope Pius V as Bishop of Nemosia. On 13 February 1569, he was consecrated bishop by Giulio Antonio Santorio, Archbishop of Santa Severina, with Giovanni Agostino Campanile, Bishop of Minori, and Umberto Locati, Bishop of Bagnoregio, serving as co-consecrators. He served as Bishop of Nemosia until his death in 1571 in the Siege of Famagusta.

Catholic Church titles
Preceded by Andrea Mocenigo	Bishop of Nemosia; 1569–1571	Succeeded by None
