= Filippo Bona =

Roman Catholic prelate

Most Reverend Filippo Bona
- Bishop of Famagusta
- Church: Catholic Church
- Diocese: Diocese of Famagusta
- In office: 1543–1552
- Predecessor: Gianfrancesco Ugoni
- Successor: Vittore de Franceschi

Personal details
- Died: 1552 Famagusta, Cyprus

Filippo Bona was a Roman Catholic prelate who served as Bishop of Famagusta (1530–1543).

== Biography ==
On 29 October 1543, Filippo Bona was appointed during the papacy of Pope Paul III as Bishop of Famagusta. He served as Bishop of Famagusta until his death in 1552. While bishop, he was the principal co-consecrator of Leone Orsini, Bishop of Fréjus (1545); and Teodoro Pio, Bishop of Faenza (1545).

== See also ==
- Catholic Church in Cyprus

== External links and additional sources ==
- Cheney, David M. "Diocese of Famagusta". Catholic-Hierarchy.org. (for Chronology of Bishops) ^{[self-published]}
- Chow, Gabriel. "Titular Episcopal See of Famagusta (Italy)". GCatholic.org. (for Chronology of Bishops) ^{[self-published]}

Catholic Church titles
Preceded by Gianfrancesco Ugoni	Bishop of Famagusta; 1543–1552	Succeeded by Vittore de Franceschi
