= Francesco Lorenzo Brancati di Lauria =

Italian cardinal and theologian (1612–1693

His Eminence Francesco Lorenzo Brancati di Lauria O.F.M. Conv.
- Cardinal-Priest of Santi Apostoli
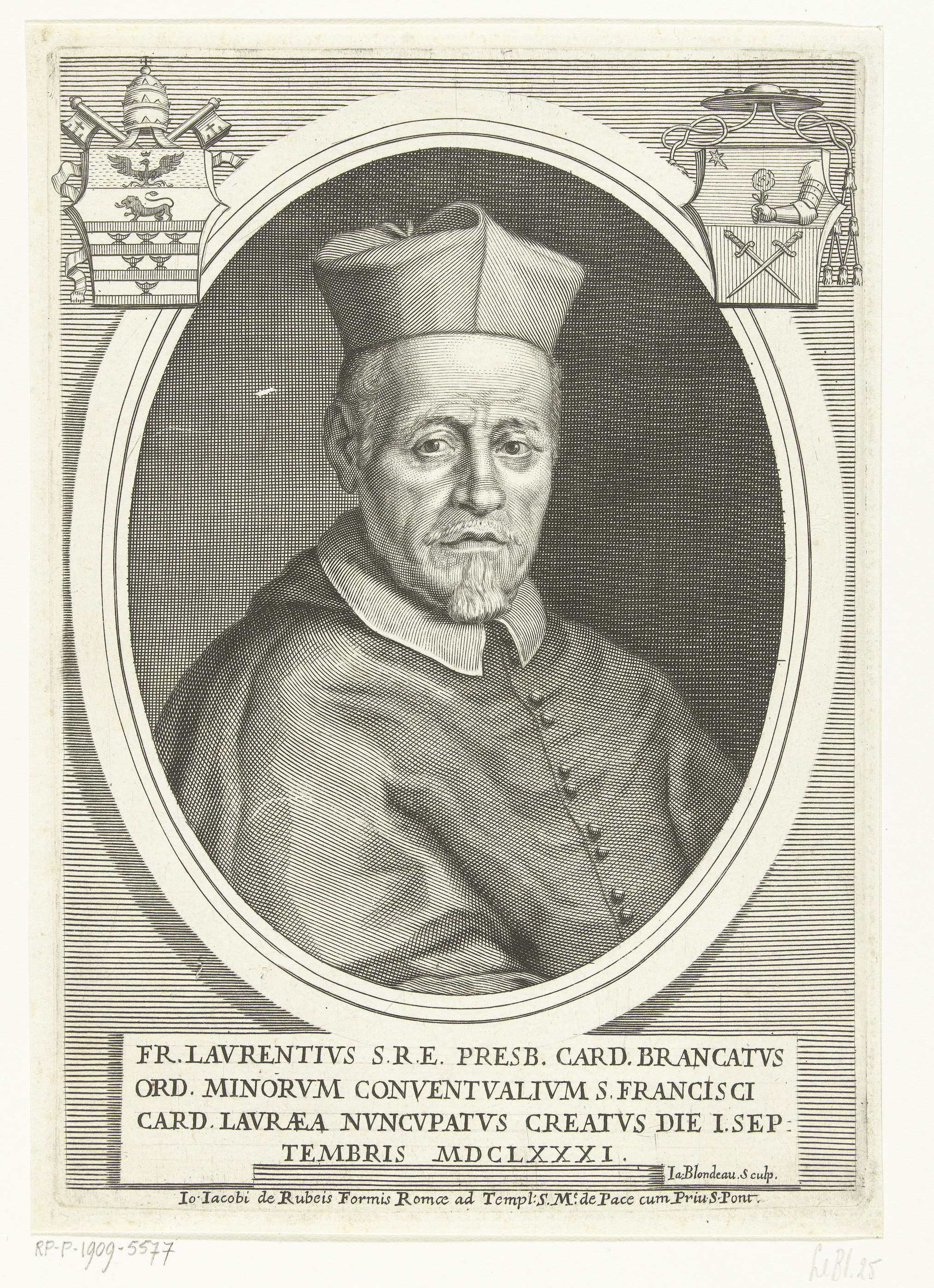
- Church: Catholic Church
- Appointed: 1 December 1681
- Term ended: 30 November 1693
- Predecessor: Paluzzo Albertoni
- Successor: Giorgio Cornaro

Orders
- Created cardinal: 1 September 1681 by Pope Innocent XI
- Rank: Cardinal-Priest

Personal details
- Born: 10 April 1612 Lauria, Italy
- Died: 30 November 1693 (aged 81) Rome, Papal States

Francesco Lorenzo Brancati di Lauria (10 April 1612, Lauria – 30 November 1693, Rome) was an Italian cardinal and theologian.

== Life and career ==
At the age of seventeen, di Lauria was struck with a dangerous illness, and he made a vow that in the event of his recovery he would enter the order of Minor Conventuals. In July, 1630, he received the religious habit at Lecce in Apulia, and shortly after the completion of his novitiate was called to Rome. He subsequently visited several of the most noted convents of his order in Italy, in which he taught philosophy and theology. In 1647, he was again recalled to Rome and was shortly afterwards made guardian of the convent attached to the Conventual Church of the Twelve Apostles, where the minister general of the order resides. In 1653, he was appointed to the chair of dogmatic theology in the Roman University, and was later made Consultor of the Congregation of the Holy Office by Pope Alexander VII who used to call him "The right arm of the Apostolic See".

He was made chief librarian of the Vatican Library by Pope Clement X, and in recognition of his devoted services to the Church was created a cardinal by Pope Innocent XI in 1681. As cardinal, he was actively connected with at least ten of the Roman Congregations. Brancati would in all probability have succeeded Innocent XI as Pope, had not the Spanish Government used its right of veto. As it was he received fifteen votes, the successful candidate being Cardinal Pietro Ottoboni who took the name of Pope Alexander VIII. He prepared himself for death in a most edifying manner, and had his tomb constructed with the inscription over it: "Ossa Fratris Laurentii Brancati de Lauria".

== Literary works ==
Brancati is the author of several important works on theology and asceticism. Perhaps the most noted of these is the commentary on the third and fourth books of the "Sentences" of Duns Scotus which appeared at Rome in eight folio volumes between the years 1653 and 1682. In this work he treats exhaustively all the subjects that pertain to special dogmatic theology. "Opuscula tria de Deo", was published at Rome in 1687, and at Rouen in 1705.

Brancati's "Epitome Canonum", which went through two editions at Rome, four at Venice, and two at Cologne, contains a complete list of all the canons to be found in the general and provincial councils, in the Decretals of Gratian and of Gregory IX, and in the encyclical letters and constitutions of the Popes up to the time of Alexander VII. His ascetical work "Opuscula octo de oratione Christiana" was published at Rome in 1685, exhibiting his profound knowledge of the spiritual life which he mastered more perhaps by his own holy living than by the abstract study of asceticism. The life of Brancati, written in Italian by Gabriele Baba, was published in Rome in 1699.

== Bibliography ==
- Hurter, Hugo von, Nomenclator (Innsbruck, 1893), II, 346
- Grammer in Kirchenlex, II, 1192
- This article incorporates text from the 1913 Catholic Encyclopedia article "Francesco Lorenzo Brancati di Lauria" by Stephen Donovan, a publication now in the public domain.
