= Guy of Ibelin (bishop) =

The Ibelin coat of arms.

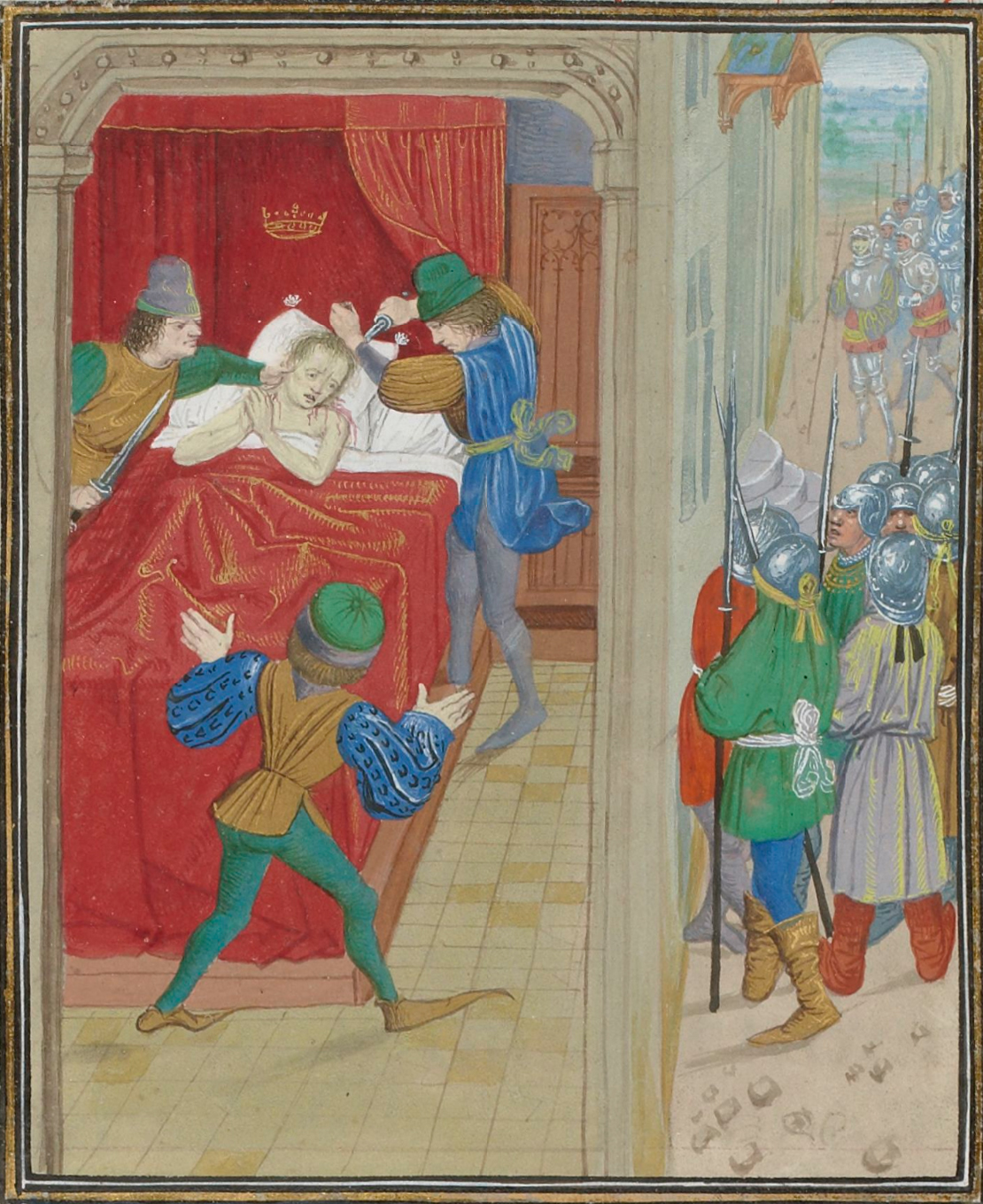
Chronicles of Jean Froissart: Peter I, crowned King of Cyprus by Guy of Ibelin in 1359, then murdered in his bed by his brother Philip and two other knights in 1369

Guy of Ibelin (Fr: Guy d'Ibelin) (died 29 March 1367) was the dominican bishop of Limassol, Cyprus from 27 April 1357 until his death. He belonged to the noble Cypriot house of Ibelin, closely linked by intermarriage with the kings of Cyprus. His father was Balian of Ibelin (d. 28 October 1333), Lord of Arsuf, and his mother, Margaret of Ibelin, continued to hold the title Lady of Arsuf after her husband's death. Guy's brother Philip became the last Ibelin to hold the title Lord of Arsuf. He was executed in Genoa in late 1373 for taking part in the assassination of King Peter I of Cyprus in 1369.

Instead of receiving a prebend, the normal path for a younger son of a high aristocratic family to join the church and enjoy the comfortable life of an ecclesiastical nobleman, Guy chose to join the austere Dominican Order, perhaps in the same monastery in Nicosia where he was later buried. Two years after his elevation to bishop in 1357, he was the presiding bishop at the coronation of Peter I in the cathedral of Saint Sophia, Nicosia. It appears that he took part in the campaign to capture Alexandria in 1365, before succumbing to illness in his mansion in Nicosia in 1367.

Guy bequeathed 20,000 bezants towards the construction of the cathedral of St Nicholas in Limassol. Although his main residence, in addition to his three rural estates, was not furnished in an opulent manner, – Turkish carpets and cushions typical of the Latin orient replacing courtly tapestries – he still indulged in hunting, having three falconers in his service, a modest number for the time.
