= Agostino Gradenigo =

Catholic bishop and Patriarch of Aquileia

- Patriarch of Aquileia
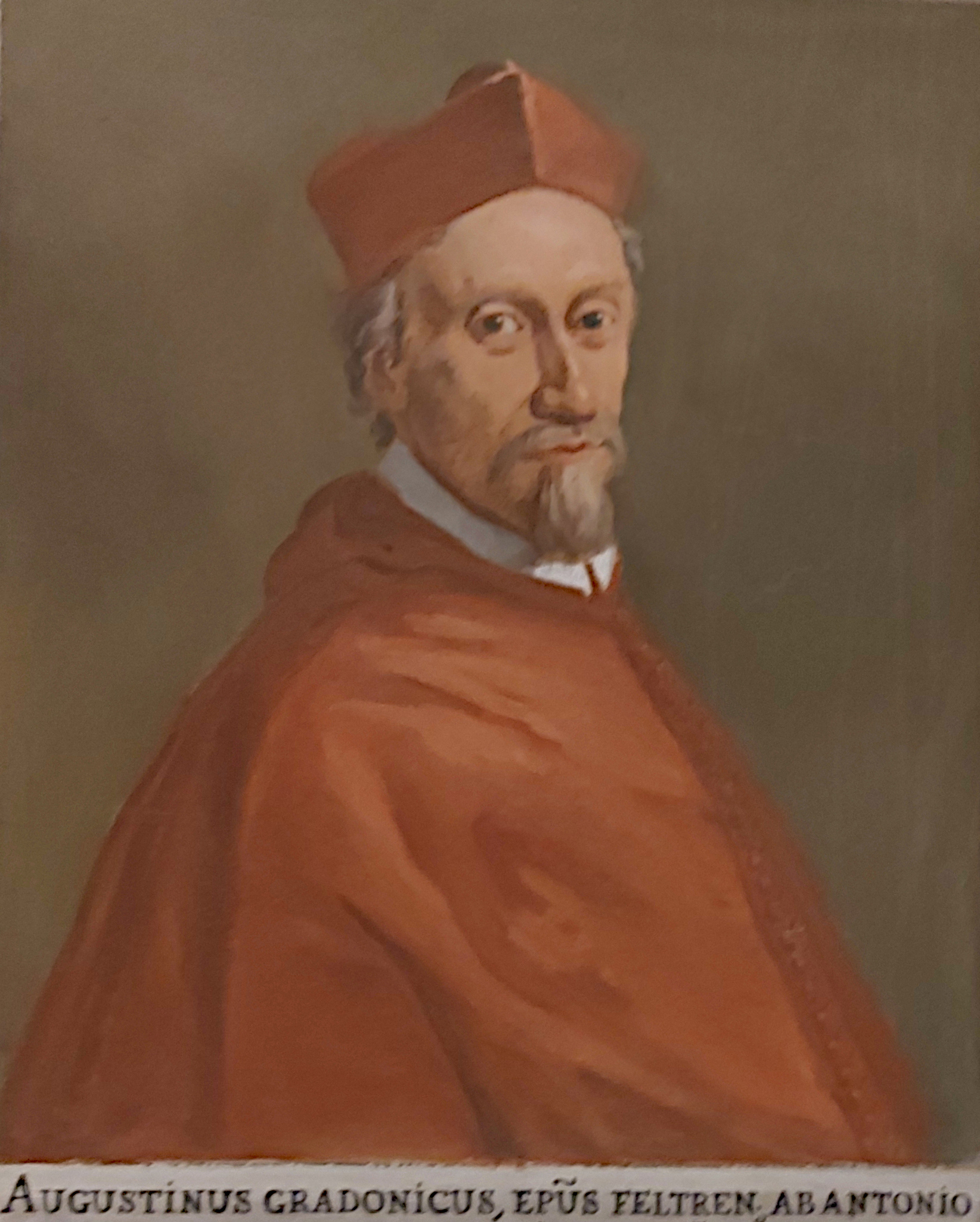
- Church: Catholic Church
- See: Patriarchate of Aquileia
- Appointed: 26 January 1628
- Term ended: 25 September 1629
- Predecessor: Antonio Grimani
- Successor: Marco Gradenigo
- Other post: Bishop of Feltre

Orders
- Consecration: 12 April 1610 (Bishop) by Ottavio Acquaviva d'Aragona

Personal details
- Born: 8 November 1570 Venice
- Died: 25 September 1629 (aged 58) Padua
- Buried: church of San Zaccaria, Venice

Agostino Gradenigo (Latin: Augustinus Gradonicus 1570 – 1629) was bishop of Feltre from 1610 to 1628, and later Patriarch of Aquileia to his death in 1629.

== Early life ==
Agostino Gradenigo was born in Venice on 8 November 1570 to the noble Gradenigo family, son of the poet Giorgio Gradenigo and of Laura Valier, sister of the bishop of Verona and Cardinal Agostino Valier who took care of the education of his nephew. Agostino graduated in utroque iure. His ecclesiastic career started with the appointment as abbot, in commendam, of the monastery of Saint Peter in Osor and in September 1591 he became canon of the Padua Cathedral.

In Padua he participated to the cultural life, being part and for a certain time also chairman of the Accademia dei Ricovrati, and he became friend of Federico Corner future Cardinal. Hoping for a quick ecclesiastical carrier he moved to Rome in 1604. The same year he refused the appointment as Latin Bishop of Candia (Crete) to remain in Rome in order to support the negotiations between the Republic of Venice and Pope Clement VIII during the Venetian Interdict. As act of gratitude, the Pope appointed him Referendary of the Tribunals of the Apostolic Signature of Justice and of Grace, He returned to Venice in 1608.

He was appointed bishop of Feltre on 29 March 1610. He received the episcopal consecration in Rome on 12 April 1610 by the hands of Cardinal Ottavio Acquaviva d'Aragona. In Feltre he reconciled the Cathedral chapter which had been in fight with the previous bishop Giacomo Rovellio. He also restored the cathedral and the near church of San Lorenzo. He however traveled often to Rome, and in 1624 Pope Urban VIII gave him a permanent position in Rome as officer over the tithe of the clergy.

== Patriarch of Aquileia ==
the large territories of the Patriarchate of Aquileia were divided between the Republic of Venice and the Holy Roman Empire, but historically a Venetian was chosen as patriarch despite the opposition of the Emperor. Agostino Gradenigo was secretly chosen by the Pope as coadjutor bishop with the right of succession to the Patriarch of Aquileia and the Venetian Senate was informed on 27 January 1624. The nomination as coadjutor was sent secretly to the Nuncio in Venice on 20 March 1627, but was made public only later the death of the previous Patriarch, Antonio Grimani, on 26 January 1628.

Emperor Ferdinand II strongly opposed this appointment, forbidding, on 12 February 1628, all his subjects from recognizing Agostino as Patriarch, and forbidding, on 12 April, Agostino from entering the territories of the patriarchate governed by the Empire. However, Agostino, accompanied by men in arms, entered Udine (the actual capital con the Patriarchate, under the Venetian government) on 30 May 1628.

When Agostino was asked to name a coadjutor bishop with the right of succession he suggested to appoint a bishop able to speak German, and he also suggested it in a letter to the Pope. The government of Venice summoned him to express its disgust at that proposal. Finally on 11 September 1629, when Agostino was already ill in Padua (probably of malaria), he decided to appoint as successor his distant relative Marco Gradenigo, and this time the Venetian Government accepted (15 September), and the Pope confirmed that decision on 22 September.

Agostino Gradenigo died in Padua in the night between 25 and 26 September 1629, and he was buried in the church of San Zaccaria in Venice.
