= Romolo Archinto =

Roman Catholic Italian bishop

Most Reverend Romolo Archinto
- Bishop of Novara
- Church: Catholic Church
- Diocese: Diocese of Novara
- In office: 1574–1576
- Predecessor: Giovanni Antonio Serbelloni
- Successor: Gerolamo Ragazzoni

Personal details
- Died: 4 September 1576 Bishop of Novara

Romolo Archinto (died 4 September 1576) was a Roman Catholic prelate who served as Bishop of Novara (1574–1576).

== Biography ==
On 26 April 1574, Romolo Archinto was appointed during the papacy of Pope Gregory XIII as Bishop of Novara. In May 1574, he was consecrated bishop by Charles Borromeo, Archbishop of Milan. He served as Bishop of Novara until his death on 4 September 1576.

== See also ==
- Catholic Church in Italy

== External links and additional sources ==
- Cheney, David M. "Diocese of Novara". Catholic-Hierarchy.org. (for Chronology of Bishops) ^{[self-published]}
- Chow, Gabriel. "Diocese of Novara (Italy)". GCatholic.org. (for Chronology of Bishops) ^{[self-published]}

Catholic Church titles
Preceded by Giovanni Antonio Serbelloni	Bishop of Novara; 1574–1576	Succeeded by Gerolamo Ragazzoni
