= Giambattista Milani =

17th-century Roman Catholic bishop

Most Reverend Giambattista Milani
- Bishop of Bergamo
- Church: Catholic Church
- Diocese: Diocese of Bergamo
- In office: 1592–1611
- Predecessor: Girolamo Ragazzoni
- Successor: Giovanni Emo

Personal details
- Died: 13 June 1617

Giambattista Milani, C.R. (died 1617) was a Roman Catholic prelate who served as Bishop of Bergamo (1592–1611).

== Biography ==
Giambattista Milani was ordained a priest in the Congregation of Clerics Regular of the Divine Providence. On 8 Apr 1592, he was appointed during the papacy of Pope Clement VIII as Bishop of Bergamo. He served as Bishop of Bergamo until his resignation in 1611. He died on 13 Jun 1617.

== External links and additional sources ==
- Cheney, David M. "Diocese of Bergamo". Catholic-Hierarchy.org. (for Chronology of Bishops) ^{[self-published]}
- Chow, Gabriel. "Diocese of Bergamo (Italy)". GCatholic.org. (for Chronology of Bishops) ^{[self-published]}

Catholic Church titles
Preceded by Girolamo Ragazzoni	Bishop of Bergamo; 1592–1611	Succeeded by Giovanni Emo
