= Germanicus Mantica =

Most Reverend Germanicus Mantica
- Bishop of Adria
- Church: Catholic Church
- Diocese: Diocese of Adria
- In office: 1633–1639
- Predecessor: Ubertinus Papafava
- Successor: Giovanni Paolo Savio
- Previous post: Titular Bishop of Famagusta (1620–1633)

Orders
- Consecration: 28 October 1620 by Giovanni Garzia Mellini

Personal details
- Died: February 1639 Adria, Italy

Germanicus Mantica (died February, 1639) was a Roman Catholic prelate who served as Bishop of Adria (1633–1639) and Titular Bishop of Famagusta (1620–1633).

== Biography ==
On 17 August 1620, Germanicus Mantica was appointed during the papacy of Pope Paul V as Titular Bishop of Famagusta. On 28 October 1620, he was consecrated bishop by Giovanni Garzia Mellini, Cardinal-Priest of Santi Quattro Coronati, with Attilio Amalteo, Titular Archbishop of Athenae, and Paolo De Curtis, Bishop Emeritus of Isernia. serving as co-consecrators. On 21 February 1633, he was appointed during the papacy of Pope Urban VIII as Bishop of Adria. He served as Bishop of Adria until his death in February 1639.

== Episcopal succession ==
Episcopal succession of Germanicus Mantica

While bishop, he was the principal co-consecrator of:

- Elias Marini, Bishop of Sardica (1624);
- Giulio Saraceni, Bishop of Pula (1627);
- Jan Baikowski, Titular Bishop of Aenus and Auxiliary Bishop of Poznań, (1627);
- Paul Aldringen, Auxiliary Bishop of Strasbourg (1627);
- Mikołaj Gabriel Fredro, Bishop of Bacău (1627);
- Ruggero Tritonio, Bishop of Poreč (1633).

Catholic Church titles
Preceded by Pietro Valier	Titular Bishop of Famagusta; 1620–1633	Succeeded by Vittore Capello
Preceded by Ubertinus Papafava	Bishop of Adria; 1633–1639	Succeeded by Giovanni Paolo Savio
