= Gian Antonio Grassi =

Italian Roman Catholic prelate

Most Reverend Gian Antonio Grassi
- Bishop of Faenza
- Church: Catholic Church
- Diocese: Diocese of Faenza
- In office: 1585–1602
- Predecessor: Annibale Grassi
- Successor: Gian Francesco Biandrate di San Giorgio Aldobrandini

Personal details
- Died: 30 July 1602 Faenza, Italy

Gian Antonio Grassi (died 1602) was a Roman Catholic prelate who served as Bishop of Faenza (1585–1602).

== Biography ==
On 18 March 1585, Gian Antonio Grassi was appointed during the papacy of Pope Gregory XIII as Bishop of Faenza. He served as Bishop of Faenza until his death on 30 July 1602.

== Bibliography ==
- Azzurrini, Bernardino (1905). Antonio Messeri (ed.). Chronica breviora aliaque monumenta Faventina a Bernardino Azzurrinio collecta. Rerum Italicarum Scriptores, XXVIII, parte iii (in Latin and Italian). Tipi della casa editrice S. Lapi. pp. 66–67.
- Renazzi, Filippo Maria (1804). Storia dell'Universita degli studi di Roma, detta comunemente la Sapienza (in Italian). Vol. II. Roma: Pagliarini. pp. 157–159, 269–271.

== External links and additional sources ==
- Cheney, David M. "Diocese of Faenza-Modigliana". Catholic-Hierarchy.org. (for Chronology of Bishops) ^{[self-published]}
- Chow, Gabriel. "Diocese of Faenza-Modigliana (Italy)". GCatholic.org. (for Chronology of Bishops) ^{[self-published]}

Catholic Church titles
Preceded by Annibale Grassi	Bishop of Faenza; 1585–1602	Succeeded by Gian Francesco Biandrate di San Giorgio Aldobrandini
