= Gerolamo Ragazzoni =

Italian Roman Catholic prelate (1537–1592)

Most Reverend Gerolamo Ragazzoni
- Bishop of Bergamo
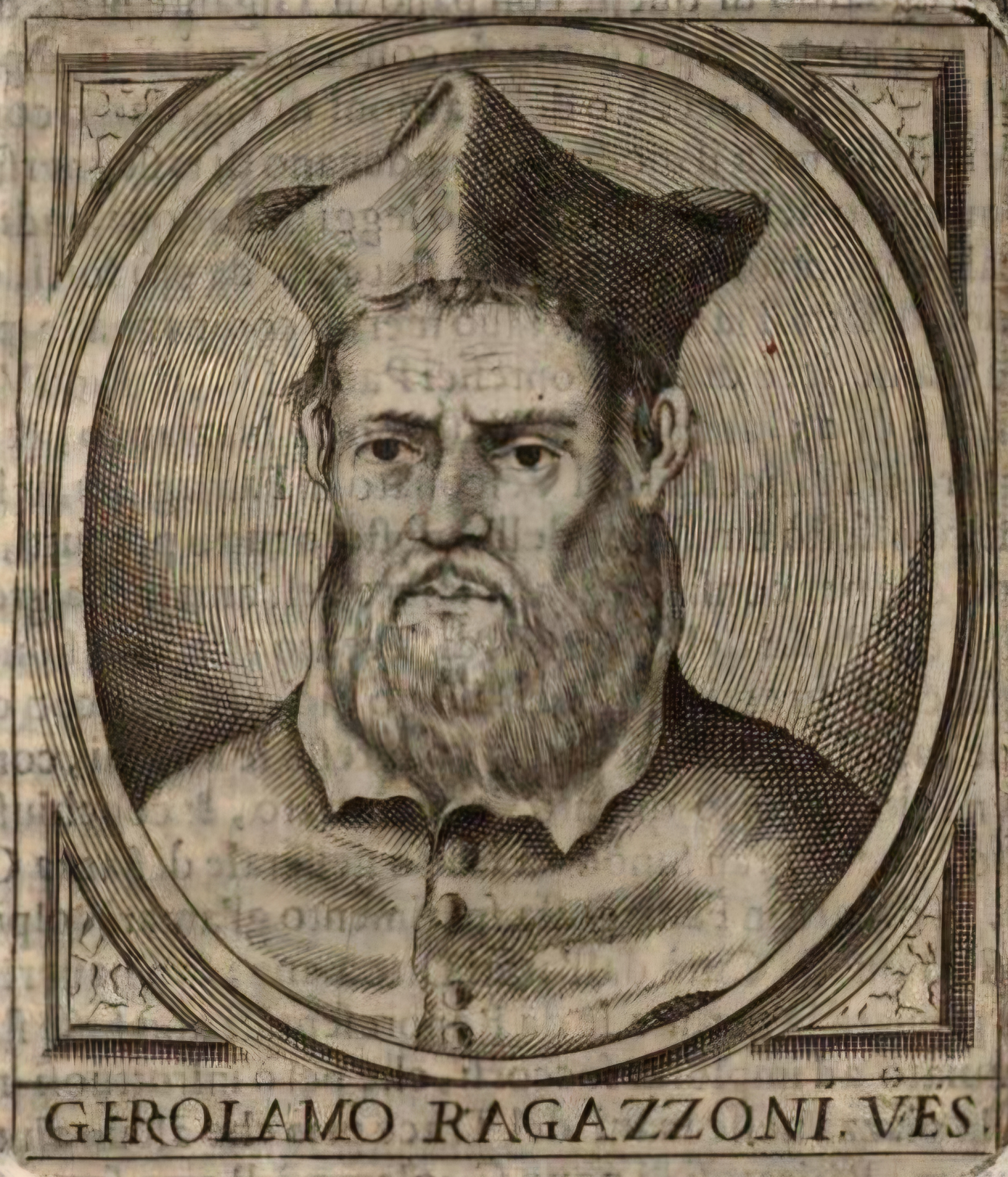
- Church: Catholic Church
- Diocese: Diocese of Bergamo
- In office: 1577–1592
- Predecessor: Federico Cornaro
- Successor: Giambattista Milani
- Previous posts: Titular Bishop of Nazianzus (1561); Coadjutor Bishop of Famagusta (1561); Apostolic Administrator of Kisamos (1572–1576); Bishop of Novara (1576–1577); Apostolic Nuncio to France (1583–1586)

Personal details
- Born: 1537 Venice, Italy
- Died: 5 March 1592 (age 55) Bergamo, Italy

Gerolamo Ragazzoni or Gerolamo Regazzoni (1537 – 5 March 1592) was an Italian Renaissance humanist and Roman Catholic prelate who served as Bishop of Bergamo (1577–1592), Apostolic Nuncio to France (1583–1586), Bishop of Novara (1576–1577), Apostolic Administrator of Kisamos (1572–1576), Coadjutor Bishop of Famagusta (1561), and Titular Bishop of Nazianzus (1561).

== Biography ==
Gerolamo Ragazzoni was born in Venice, Italy in 1537. On 15 January 1561, he was appointed during the papacy of Pope Pius IV as Titular Bishop of Nazianzus and Coadjutor Bishop of Famagusta. On 10 December 1572, he was appointed during the papacy of Pope Gregory XIII as Apostolic Administrator of Kisamos after the Ottoman conquest of Cyprus in 1570. On 19 September 1576, he was appointed during the papacy of Pope Gregory XIII as Bishop of Novara. On 19 July 1577, he was appointed during the papacy of Pope Gregory XIII as Bishop of Bergamo. In 1583, he was appointed during the papacy of Pope Gregory XIII as Apostolic Nuncio to France. In 1586, he resigned as Apostolic Nuncio to France. He served as Bishop of Bergamo until his death on 5 March 1592.

== Works ==
- Ragazzoni, Gerolamo (1555). In epistolas Ciceronis familiares commentarius: in quo breuissime, quo quaeque earum ordine scripta sit, ex ipsa potissimum historia demonstratur (in Latin). Venetiis: apud Paulum Manutium Aldi F.
- Ragazzoni, Gerolamo (1556). Le Filippiche di Marco T. Cicerone contra Marco Antonio, fatte volgari (in Italian). Venezia: Paolo Manuzio.
- Ragazzoni, Gerolamo (1563). Oratio habita in sessione nona, et ultima, sacri Concilii Tridentini (in Latin). Brixiae: ad instantiam Io. Baptistae Bozole.

== Episcopal succession ==
While bishop, he was the principal consecrator of:

- François de La Rochefoucauld, Bishop of Clermont (1585);
- Guillaume Rose, Bishop of Senlis (1584);

and the principal co-consecrator of:

- Alessandro Maria Sauli, Bishop of Aleria (1570),
- Giovanni Fontana, Coadjutor Bishop of Ferrara (1589
- Alberto Valier, Titular Bishop of Famagusta and Coadjutor Bishop of Verona (1591).

== External links and additional sources ==
- Brunelli, Giampiero (2016). "RAGAZZONI, Girolamo". Dizionario Biografico degli Italiani (in Italian). Vol. 86: Querenghi–Rensi. Rome: Istituto dell'Enciclopedia Italiana. ISBN 978-88-12-00032-6.
- Cheney, David M. "Diocese of Famagusta". Catholic-Hierarchy.org. (for Chronology of Bishops) ^{[self-published]}
- Chow, Gabriel. "Titular Episcopal See of Famagusta (Italy)". GCatholic.org. (for Chronology of Bishops) ^{[self-published]}
- Cheney, David M. "Nunciature to France". Catholic-Hierarchy.org. (for Chronology of Bishops) ^{[self-published]}
- Chow, Gabriel. "Apostolic Nunciature France". GCatholic.org. (for Chronology of Bishops) ^{[self-published]}
- Cheney, David M. "Diocese of Kisamos (Cisamo)". Catholic-Hierarchy.org. (for Chronology of Bishops) ^{[self-published]}
- Chow, Gabriel. "Titular Episcopal See of Cisamus (Greece)". GCatholic.org. (for Chronology of Bishops) ^{[self-published]}
- Cheney, David M. "Diocese of Novara". Catholic-Hierarchy.org. (for Chronology of Bishops) ^{[self-published]}
- Chow, Gabriel. "Diocese of Novara (Italy)". GCatholic.org. (for Chronology of Bishops) ^{[self-published]}
- Cheney, David M. "Diocese of Bergamo". Catholic-Hierarchy.org. (for Chronology of Bishops) ^{[self-published]}
- Chow, Gabriel. "Diocese of Bergamo (Italy)". GCatholic.org. (for Chronology of Bishops) ^{[self-published]}

Catholic Church titles
Preceded by Marcus Vetter (bishop)	Titular Bishop of Nazianzus; 1561-?	Succeeded by Francesco Maria Enrici
Preceded by Vittore de Franceschi	Coadjutor Bishop of Famagusta; 1561	Succeeded by None
Preceded by Prospero Publicola Santacroce	Apostolic Administrator of Kisamos; 1572–1576	Succeeded by
Preceded by Romolo Archinto	Bishop of Novara; 1576–1577	Succeeded by Pomponio Cotta
Preceded by Giovanni Battista Castelli (bishop)	Apostolic Nuncio to France; 1583–1586	Succeeded by Innocenzo Del Bufalo-Cancellieri
Preceded by Federico Cornaro	Bishop of Bergamo (1577–1592)	Succeeded by Giambattista Milani
