= Vittore de Franceschi =

Roman Catholic prelate

Most Reverend Vittore de Franceschi
- Bishop of Famagusta
- Church: Catholic Church
- Diocese: Diocese of Famagusta
- In office: 1552–?
- Predecessor: Filippo Bona
- Successor: Gerolamo Ragazzoni

Vittore de Franceschi was a Roman Catholic prelate who was Bishop of Famagusta (1552–?).

== Biography ==
On 12 February 1552, Vittore de Franceschi was appointed during the papacy of Pope Julius III as Bishop of Famagusta. It is uncertain how long he served. The next bishop of record is Gerolamo Ragazzoni who was appointed on 15 January 1561. While bishop, he was the principal co-consecrator of Vincenzo Diedo, Patriarch of Venice (1556).

== External links and additional sources ==
- Cheney, David M. "Diocese of Famagusta". Catholic-Hierarchy.org. (for Chronology of Bishops) ^{[self-published]}
- Chow, Gabriel. "Titular Episcopal See of Famagusta (Italy)". GCatholic.org. (for Chronology of Bishops) ^{[self-published]}

Catholic Church titles
Preceded by Filippo Bona	Bishop of Famagusta; 1552–?	Succeeded by Gerolamo Ragazzoni
