= Diocese of Famagusta =

Former Latin Catholic diocese in Cyprus

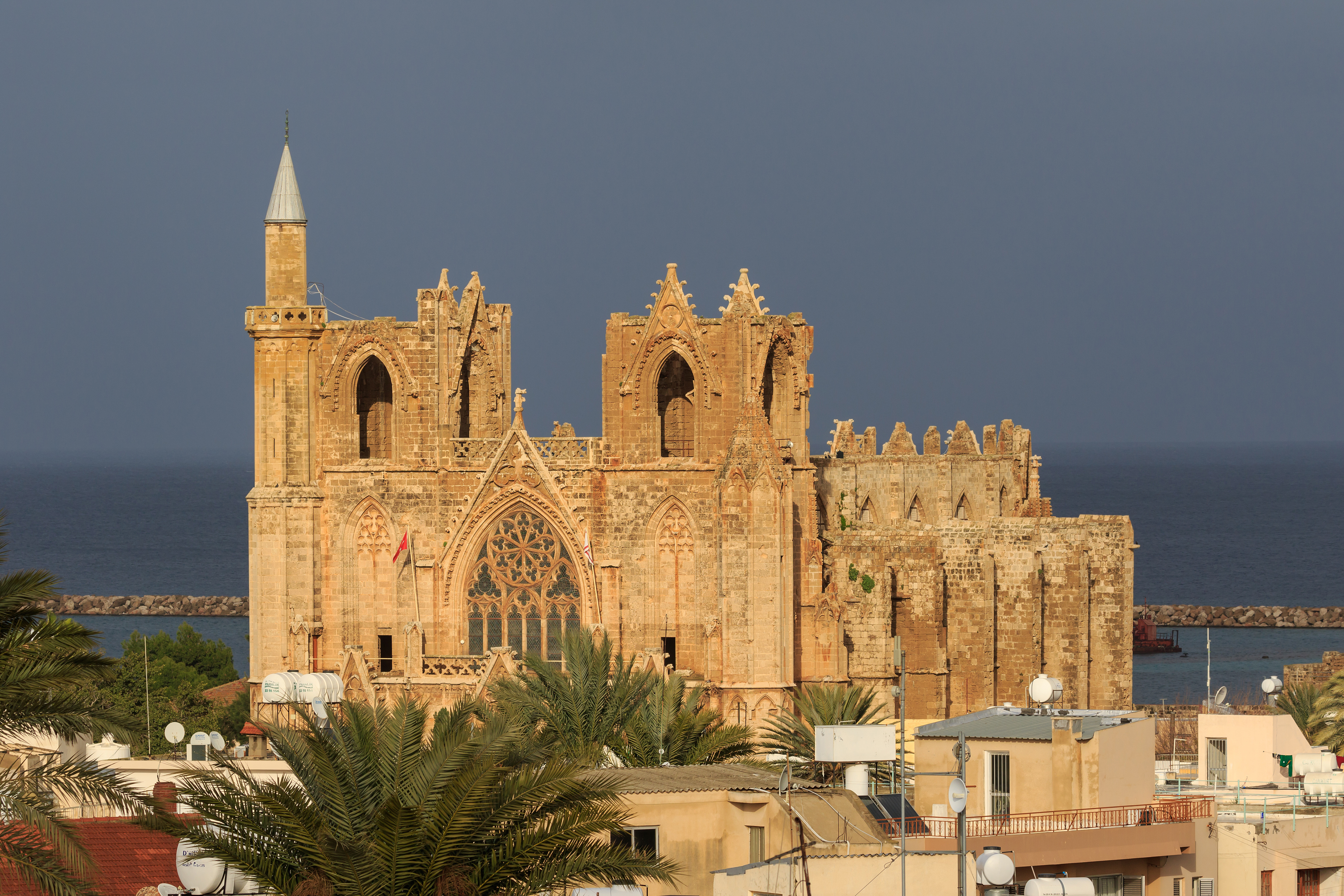
The former cathedral of Saint Nicholas, now the Lala Mustafa Pasha Mosque

The Diocese of Famagusta (Latin: Dioecesis Famagustanus) was a Latin Church ecclesiastical jurisdiction or diocese of the Catholic Church. Its episcopal see was the city of Famagusta, on the island of Cyprus during crusader rule, and is now a Latin Catholic titular see.

== History ==
From the seventh century conquest of Cyprus by the Islamic Arabs, the Greek Metropolitan Archdiocese of Salamina-Costanza transferred its see to Famagosta, until the Catholic crusaders conquered Cyprus in 1191, and relegated the Greek Metropolitanate to a marginal part, confining it to Karpasia.

In 1291, the bishop of Tortosa in Syria, and his people, took refuge in Famagust after their city was conquered by the Arabs. With a papal bull of Boniface VIII in 1295, the Latin diocese of Tortosa was united with that of Famagusta. The Latin rite see was erected in 1196 with Pope Celestine III's consent as the Diocese of Famagosta. as a suffragan of the Latin Catholic Archdiocese of Nicosia.

It was suppressed in 1571 after the Ottoman conquest of Cyprus in 1570, its Cypriot territory being reassigned to Titular Patriarchal See of Jerusalem, but immediately transformed as the Titular See of Famagusta. Its former cathedral, dedicated to Saint Nicholas, was transformed into the Lala Mustafa Pasha Mosque.

In 1933 it was renamed as Titular Episcopal See of Famagusta.

== List of bishops ==
=== Residential bishops ===
- Caesarius of Alagno (before 1211 – 25 September 1225), transferred to the archdiocese of Salerno
- A. (mentioned 1231)
- George (mid-13th century)
- Stephen of Mezel (1244–1259)
- Velasco (25 August 1265 – 17 September 1267), Order of Friars Minor, transferred to the diocese of Guarda
- Bertrand (1 September 1268 – ????)
  - John (???? – c. 1278), elect, never consecrated
- Paganus (6 April 1278 – ????)
- William
- Matthew (before 1286 – ????), died in office
  - Bernard (5 September 1291 – ????), Order of Saint Benedict, apostolic administrator
- Mancellus (mentioned 1295), Dominican Order
- Guy (22 June 1298 – ????)
- Baldwin (???? – c. 1328), died in office
- Mark, (14 October 1328 – 1346), Dominican Order died in office
- Itier of Nabinaux, (26 June 1346 – ????), Order of Friars Minor, previously Bishop of Limassol (3 March 1344 – 26 June 1346), died in office
- Leodegar (Léger) of Nabinaux (14 August 1348 – ????), died in office
- Arnaud (17 December 1365 – 13 July 1379), transferred to the diocese of Lombez
- Francesco Rafardi (13 July 1379 – 28 May 1380), Order of Friars Minor, elect, never consecrated, transferred to the diocese of Segorbe
  - James (28 May 1380 – ????), elect, died before consecrated
- Goffredo (30 July 1384 – ????)
- Rainaldo
- Bertrando d'Alagno (12 October 1390 – 4 January 1391), transferred to the diocese of Gubbio
- Raffaele (12 October 1390 – ????)
- (un?)canonical Pietro Marinaco, Order of Friars Minor, previously Anti-bishop of Diocese of Sospel (27 August 1392 – 4 September 1409), obedient to the schismatic Papacy of Avignon
- Luchino (2 October 1395 – ????), died in office
- Luciano Lercaro (3 August 1403 – 26 September 1407), died in office
- Pietro (4 September 1409 – ????), Order of Friars Minor, died in office
  - Giovanni di Montenegro (26 May 1412 – ????), Order of Friars Minor, anti-bishop, died in office
- Gioachino Torselli (14 May 1414 – ????), Servite Order, died in office
- Nicola di Tenda (20 December 1417 – ????), Dominican Order, died in office
- Giacomo Guastandenghi (23 January 1441 – ????), Dominican Order died in office
- Giovanni, (23 May 1442 – ????), Order of Saint Benedict, died in office
- Agostino (11 May 1450 – ????), Order of Cistercians, died in office
- Domenico Michiel (23 July 1455 – ????), Dominican Order, died in office
- Pietro (11 May 1472 – ????), Order of the Brothers of the Blessed Virgin Mary of Mount Carmel, died in office
- Francesco de Pernisiis de Saona (31 March 1473 – ????), Order of Friars Minor, died in office
- Pietro Milite (2 June 1477 – ????)
- Francesco Marcelli (14 June 1481 – 22 October 1488), transferred to the diocese of Traù
- Alvise Cippico (22 Oct 1488 – 11 Dec 1503), next Archbishop of Zadar)
- Marco Cornaro (11 Dec 1503 – resigned 1 July 1504), also Apostolic Administrator of the Diocese of Verona (29 November 1503 – 24 July 1524); previously Cardinal-Deacon of Santa Maria in Campitelli (5 October 1500 – 19 March 1513); later Latin Patriarch of Constantinople (July 1506 – 30 October 1507), transferred Cardinal-Deacon of Santa Maria in Via Lata (19 March 1513 – 14 December 1523), Bishop of Padova (9 March 1517 – 24 July 1524), Apostolic Administrator of Diocese of Nardò (24 Junuary 1519 – 20 February 1521), Archpriest of Papal Basilica of St. Peter in Rome (1520.09 – 1524.07.24), Protodeacon of Sacred College of Cardinals (20 December 1520 – 14 December 1523), Latin Patriarch of Constantinople (1521 – 24 July 1524), promoted to cardinal-priest of San Marco (14 December 1523 – 20 May 1524), promoted Cardinal-Bishop of the Suburbicarian Diocese of Albano (20 May 1524 – 15 June 1524), transferred Cardinal-Bishop of Palestrina (15 June 1524 – July 24 1524)
- Mattia Ugoni (1 July 1504 – 1529), resigned
- Gianfrancesco Ugoni (10 January 1530 – 1543), died in office
- Filippo Bona (29 October 1543 – 1552), died in office
- Vittore de Franceschi (12 February 1552 – )
  - ?Coadjutor Bishop Gerolamo Ragazzoni (15 January 1561 – see suppressed 1571 - transferred 10 December 1572), no titular see; next transferred, due to the Ottoman conquest in 1571, Apostolic Administrator of Diocese of Kisamos (Crete, insular Greece) (10 December 1572 – 19 September 1576), Bishop of Novara (19 September 1576 – 19 July 1577), Bishop of Bergamo (19 July 1577 – 17 March 1592), also papal diplomat: Apostolic Nuncio (ambassador) to France (1583 – resigned? 1586).

=== Titular bishops ===
- Titular Archbishop: Giuseppe Schiavini (28 June 1963 – 1 April 1974)
- Domenico Bernareggi (16 June 1945 – 22 October 1962)
- Ettore Castelli (8 May 1943 – 3 May 1945)
- Paolo Castiglioni (12 January 1937 – 19 March 1943)
- Giovanni Mauri (14 November 1904 – 13 November 1936)
- Federico Domenico Sala (23 January 1903 – 5 December 1903)
- Angelo Maria Meraviglia Mantegazza (24 April 1897 – 26 September 1902)
- Biagio Pisani (later Archbishop) (29 November 1895 – 23 April 1897)
- Carlo Caccia Dominioni (3 August 1857 – 6 October 1866)
- Federico Manfredini (24 January 1842 – 19 March 1857)
- Guilelmus Zerbi (27 June 1825 – 18 August 1841)
- Giovanni Martino Bernardoni Baccolo (1 June 1795 – 12 October 1823)
- Giovanni Battista Santonini (27 June 1785 – 12 January 1795)
- Franciscus Condulmer (28 May 1770 – 1785)
- Alessandro Pappafava (6 April 1761 – 18 February 1770)
- Alvise Maria Gabrieli (2 October 1758 – 7 April 1761)
- Giovanni Francesco Mora (19 February 1748 – 2 October 1758), Oratory of Saint Philip Neri
- Sergio Pola (19 July 1706 – 8 February 1748)
- Bishop-elect Vincenzo Bonifacio (19 February 1674 – ?)
- Giacomo Vianoli (26 June 1656 – 18 December 1673)
- Titular Archbishop: Gerolamo Gradenigo (later Patriarch) (6 July 1654 – 22 February 1656)
- Vittore Capello (20 June 1633 – ?)
- Germanico Mantica (17 August 1620 – 21 February 1633)
- Pietro Valier (later Cardinal) (18 May 1611 – 18 May 1620)
- Alberto Valier (13 February 1591 – 1606)

== See also ==
- List of Catholic dioceses in Cyprus

== Sources and external links ==
- GCatholic - former & titular bishopric
- (in French) L'évêché de Famagouste, in Annuaire Pontifical Catholique 1913, pp. 454–463
- Catholic-Hierarchy.org -Diocese of Famagusta". David M. Cheney (self-published)

Bibliography

- Pius Bonifacius Gams, Series episcoporum Ecclesiae Catholicae, Leipzig 1931, p. 439
- Konrad Eubel, Hierarchia Catholica Medii Aevi, vol. 1, pp. 244–245; vol. 2, p. 152; vol. 3, p. 194; vol. 4, p. 184; vol. 5, p. 198; vol. 6, pp. 212–213
- L'évêché de Famagouste, in Annuaire Pontifical Catholique 1913, pp. 454–463
- John Hackett, A History of the Orthodox Church of Cyprus, Methuen & co., London 1901, pp. 577–587
- Siméon Vailhé, v. Famagusta, Catholic Encyclopedia, vol. V, New York 1909
- H. Rudt de Collenberg Wipertus, État et origine du haut clergé de Chypre avant le Grand Schisme d'après les Registres des Papes du XIII et du XIV siècle, in Mélanges de l'Ecole française de Rome, vol. 91, n. 1, 1979, pages 197–332 (notably pp. 202, 212-214, 223-225, 274-277, 287-288, 302-304)
- H. Rudt de Collenberg Wipertus, Le royaume et l'Église de Chypre face au Grand Schisme (1378-1417) d'après les Registres des Archives du Vatican, in Mélanges de l'Ecole française de Rome, vol. 94, n. 2, 1982, pp. 621–701 (notably pages 647-651, 654-655)
