= Elias Marini =

Most Reverend Elias Marini
- Bishop of Sardica
- Church: Catholic Church
- Diocese: Diocese of Sardica
- In office: 1624–1641
- Predecessor: Petrus Salinates
- Successor: Petrus Deodato

Orders
- Consecration: 18 August 1624 by Giovanni Garzia Mellini

Personal details
- Died: 15 June 1641 Sofia, Bulgaria

Elias Marini, O.F.M. or Elias Marinich (died 1641) was a Roman Catholic prelate who served as Bishop of Sardica (1624–1641).

== Biography ==
Elias Marini was ordained a priest in the Order of Friars Minor. On 29 July 1624, Elias Marini was appointed during the papacy of Pope Urban VIII as Bishop of Sardica. On 18 August 1624, he was consecrated bishop by Giovanni Garzia Mellini, Cardinal-Priest of Santi Quattro Coronati, with Germanicus Mantica, Titular Bishop of Famagusta, and Antonio Bonfiglioli, Bishop Emeritus of Carinola, serving as co-consecrators. He served as Bishop of Sardica until his death on 15 June 1641.

Catholic Church titles
| Preceded by Petrus Salinates | Bishop of Sardica; 1624–1641 | Succeeded by Petrus Deodato |
