= Alvise Cippico =

Most Reverend Alvise Cippico
- Archbishop of Zadar
- Church: Catholic Church
- Archdiocese: Archdiocese of Zadar
- In office: 1503
- Predecessor: Giovanni Robobello
- Successor: Francesco de Pisauro
- Previous post: Bishop of Famagusta (1488–1503)

Personal details
- Born: 16 September 1456 Trau
- Died: 2 March 1504 (age 47) Rome, Italy

Alvise Cippico or Ivan Cippicus (16 September 1456 – 2 March 1504) was a Roman Catholic prelate who served as Archbishop of Zadar (1503) and Bishop of Famagusta (1488–1503).

== Biography ==
Alvise Cippico was born in Trau on 16 September 1456. On 22 October 1488, he was appointed during the papacy of Pope Innocent VIII as Bishop of Famagusta. On 11 December 1503, he was appointed during the papacy of Pope Julius II as Archbishop of Zadar. He died in Rome on 2 March 1504 before he could take possession of the see. His successor Francesco de Pisauro, was appointed on 18 April 1505.

== External links and additional sources ==
- Cheney, David M. "Diocese of Famagusta". Catholic-Hierarchy.org. (for Chronology of Bishops) ^{[self-published]}
- Chow, Gabriel. "Titular Episcopal See of Famagusta (Italy)". GCatholic.org. (for Chronology of Bishops) ^{[self-published]}
- Cheney, David M. "Archdiocese of Zadar (Zara)". Catholic-Hierarchy.org. (for Chronology of Bishops) ^{[self-published]}
- Chow, Gabriel. "Archdiocese of Zadar (Croatia)". GCatholic.org. (for Chronology of Bishops) ^{[self-published]}

Catholic Church titles
Preceded by Francesco Marcelli	Bishop of Famagusta; 1488–1503	Succeeded by Marco Cornaro
Preceded by Giovanni Robobello	Archbishop of Zadar; 1503	Succeeded by Francesco de Pisauro
