= Vincenzo Bonifacio =

Most Reverend Vincenzo Bonifacio
- Titular Bishop of Famagusta
- Church: Catholic Church
- In office: 1674–1706
- Predecessor: Giacomo Vianoli
- Successor: Sergio Pola

Orders
- Ordination: 23 September 1656
- Consecration: 24 February 1674 by Giambattista Spada

Personal details
- Born: 2 June 1630 Rovigo, Italy
- Died: Unknown

Vincenzo Bonifacio (born 2 June 1630) was a Roman Catholic prelate who served as Titular Bishop of Famagusta (1674–1706).

== Biography ==
Vincenzo Bonifacio was born in Rovigo, Italy on 2 June 1630 and ordained a priest on 23 September 1656. On 19 February 1674, he was appointed during the papacy of Pope Clement X as Titular Bishop of Famagusta. On 24 February 1674, he was consecrated bishop by Giambattista Spada, Cardinal-Priest of San Crisogono, with Antonio Pignatelli del Rastrello, Bishop of Lecce, and Francesco de' Marini, Titular Archbishop of Amasea, serving as co-consecrators. He served as Titular Bishop of Famagusta until his resignation on 14 July 1706.

While bishop, he was the principal co-consecrator of Joannes Lucidus Cataneo, Bishop of Mantova (1674).

Catholic Church titles
Preceded by Giacomo Vianoli	Titular Bishop of Famagusta; 1674–1706	Succeeded by Sergio Pola
