= Marco Gradenigo (patriarch of Aquileia) =

- Patriarch of Aquileia
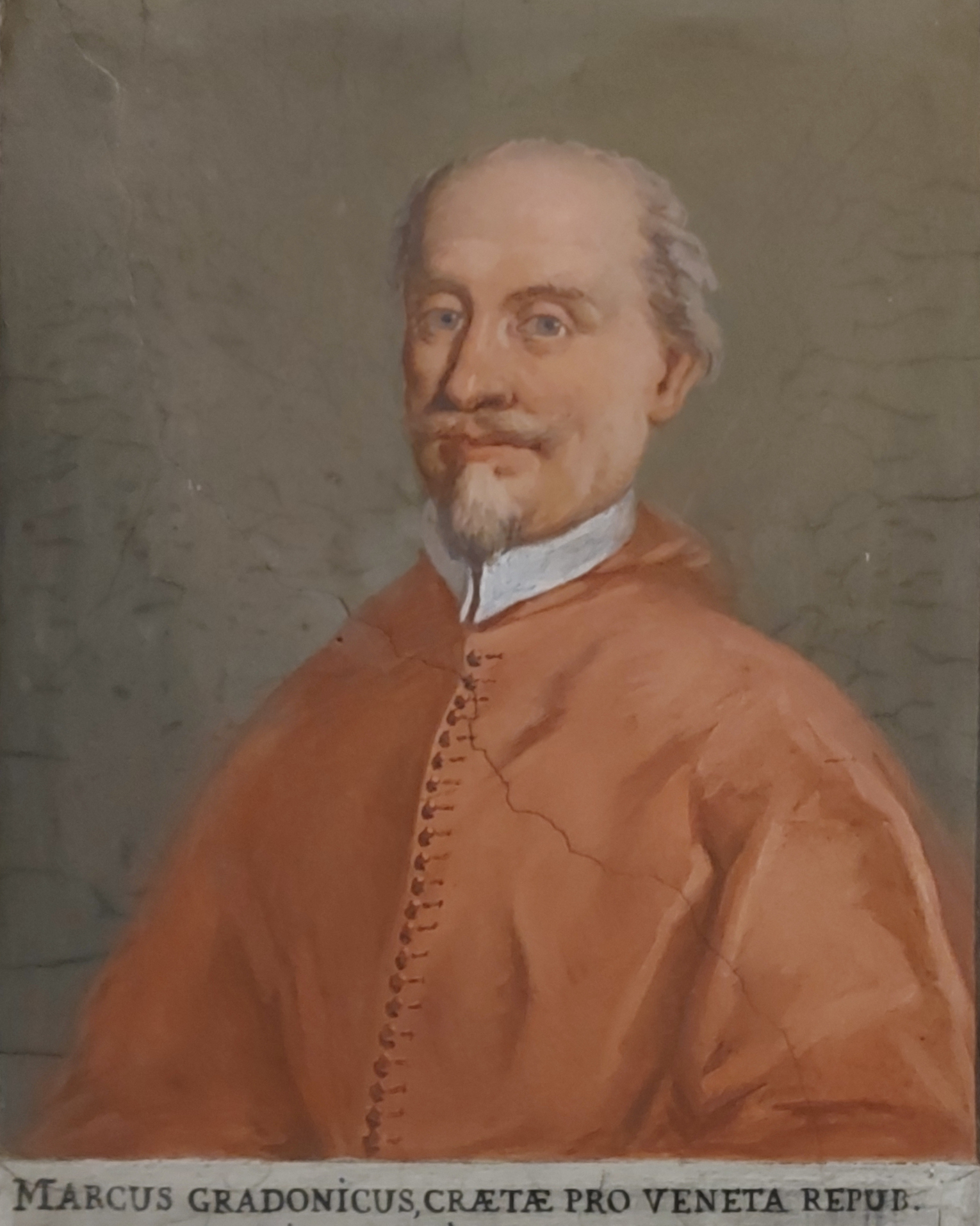
- Church: Catholic Church
- See: Patriarchate of Aquileia
- Appointed: 25 September 1629
- Term ended: 16 February 1656
- Predecessor: Agostino Gradenigo
- Successor: Gerolamo Gradenigo

Orders
- Consecration: 2 January 1633 (Bishop) by Antonio Marcello Barberini

Personal details
- Born: 14 October 1589 Venice
- Died: 16 February 1656 (aged 66) Venice
- Buried: church of Corpus Domini, Venice

Marco Gradenigo (Latin: Marcus Gradonicus 1589 – 1656) was Duke of Crete from 1627 to 1629, and later Patriarch of Aquileia to his death in 1656.

== Civil career ==
Marco Gradenigo was born in Venice in 14 October 1589 to the noble Gradenigo family, son of Gian Giacomo. Member of a secondary branch of the Gradenigo family, his father managed to create an important position for himself in Venetian society as a lawyer, becoming wealthy and becoming the founder of the Di rio Marin branch of the family.

In 1618 Marco Gradenigo was elected provveditore alle Pompe (a minor public office, aimed to limit the use of precious and luxury objects and their display). Other minors public offices were assigned to him up to 1624 when he became member of the Avogadoria de Comùn (similar to that of a modern State Attorney), and in 1626 he was appointed Superintendent of the Fortresses. In March 1627 the Maggior Consiglio finally appointed him as Duke of Crete (i.e. governor of Crete).

Arrived in Candia in February 1628 Marco Gradenigo, with his resolute character, tackled head-on the main problem plaguing the city, i.e. the abuses of the local Venetian nobility against the Greek urban and rural population. He earned wide consensus with the public execution of the noble Zorzi da Ca' Fradello along with his armed men. In the capital Candia he supported the urban development, applied a tax exemption to foreigners intending to trade and ordered the first census of the population. However his health conditions forced him in autumn 1628 to delegate the govern to his great-captain Piero Giustinian.

== Ecclesiastic career ==
Thanks to the support of his influent father, on 22 September 1629 Marco was chosen as coadjutor bishop with right of succession by his distant relative Agostino Gradenigo, Patriarch of Aquileia. Agostino Gradenigo died a few days later on 25 September. The appointment of a coadjutor bishop with right of succession was an use supported by the Republic of Venice to exclude any appointments to that See by the Holy Roman Emperor, who ruled about the half of the territories of the Patriarchate and wanted to appoint one of his subjects. Marco received the news of his appointment when he was ill in Crete, and moved to Venice and Rome to get the holy orders. However, due to the dislike of this succession by the Emperor, his appointment was kept concealed up to 22 April 1632 when Pope Urban VIII published it. He received the episcopal consecration in the Roman church of Sant'Egidio on 2 January 1633 by the hands of Cardinal Antonio Barberini senior.

He was given the pallium on 14 March 1633 and he entered in the Udine Cathedral the next 5 November. In Udine he faced a long series of conflicts in particular with the Cathedral chapter and in 1634 he went to Verona to settle a dispute between the bishop Marco Giustiniani and that chapter. During the Cretan War in 1645–1646 his supported the Venetian army with the incomes of the Patriarchate. His fierce character, and his determination to protect the interests of the Patriarchate, however put him one time in verbal conflict even with the Doge.

Since 1638 he enlarged the seminary, sorting out its finances. On 31 August 1653 he obtained the translation of the body of Saint Eugene martyr from catacombs in Rome to the Udine Cathedral. Marco Gradenigo died on 16 February 1656 in Venice, and was buried in the church of Corpus Domini.
