= Camillo Caetani =

Italian aristocrat and Papal diplomat

Camillo Caetani (Gaetano) (Sermoneta (?) 1552 – Rome 6 August 1603) was an Italian aristocrat and Papal diplomat in several European capitals during the early Counterreformation.

== Early life ==
Camillo Caetani was the third son of Bonifacio Caetani and Caterina Pio di Savoia. He was destined for a career in the church and took holy orders in 1562. In 1573 he obtained his doctorate in civil and canon law at Perugia. In the following years he lived in family residences in Rome, managing personal and family affairs. He was made commendatory abbot of San Vincenzo al Volturno on 23 April 1573 after the benefice was relinquished by his uncle Cardinal Niccolò Caetani. He was made prior of Valvisciolo Abbey and soon after Pope Gregory XIII gave him a number of other benefices including the Cistercian abbey of Santa Maria degli Angeli in Faenza. In 1580 he became prior of San Andrea in Turin, and on 13 May 1587, of the Basilian monastery of Santa Maria di Pattano in Capaccio. On 22 August 1588 he was named Patriarch of Alexandria.

== Mission to Paris ==
In the autumn of 1589 Camillo had his introduction to political life when he accompanied his brother Cardinal Enrico Caetani to France, where he had been appointed Cardinal legate. This mission was sent by Pope Sixtus V to urge the House of Guise, heads of the Catholic League, and Charles IX, who had been proclaimed king after the assassination of Henry III, to pursue the fight against the Huguenots and prevent the accession of Henry of Navarre. His brother soon sent him back to Rome to persuade the Pope to grant immediate subsidies to the Catholic League, to declare unconditionally that Henry could not be king, and to offer papal mediation to help establish an alliance of all the major Catholic powers against the enemies of the faith. Caetani set off from Paris on 3 March 1590, and on his way back to Italy visited the Duke of Nevers, who held himself aloof from the activities of the Catholic League and was eventually to pledge loyalty to Henry IV.

Arriving in Rome on 4 April, Caetani found Sixtus V now preoccupied with how to avoid Spain increasing its influence over affairs in Italy and the rest of Europe, and therefore much less enthusiastic than before about supporting a strategy that risked extending its hegemony over France. At the same time, the Pope did not want to adopt any course of action that might preclude an eventual accommodation with Henry of Navarre, if he were to become King of France. Regardless of the Pope's equivocations, Cardinal Enrico Caetani continued to pursue an uncompromising policy in Paris, openly supporting and funding the House of Guise and the Catholic League. The Pope's displeasure at this disobedience was visited both on the Cardinal himself, who found all payments to his mission from the Vatican stopped, and on Camillo, who was placed under house arrest on 3 June 1590 for three weeks and forbidden to involve himself in any political activities. He was only rehabilitated after the pro-Spanish Gregory XIV become Pope, who then named him nuncio to the Imperial court in Vienna on 22 April 1591.

== Mission to Prague ==
Caetani left Rome in early May, taking his nephew Gregorio with him. He stopped in Innsbruck and in Munich for diplomatic meetings, and in Vienna he had discussions with the Archdukes Ernest and Matthias. He arrived in Prague (then the Imperial capital) on 20 June, and had his first audience with Emperor Rudolf II on 23 June. Rudolf was inclined to be flexible and pragmatic with his Protestant subjects, in the interests of maintaining the integrity of the Empire, and was thus disinclined to take the kind of firm line that the Vatican favoured. During his nunciature, lasting just over a year, Caetani tried to work against the advancement of Protestantism in the Empire, for example, by opposing the appointment of a Protestant administrator to the Prince-Bishopric of Osnabrück and the advances of Lutherans in the Duchy of Brunswick-Lüneburg. In the hereditary Habsburg lands, Caetani urged the Emperor to choose an archbishop for the vacant see of Prague, to make other appointments in Hungary, and to enact the many reforms agreed upon at the Council of Trent. Following the line of Pope Gregory XIV in the conflict over the French succession, he tried to prevent the raising of troops for Henry of Navarre while seeking Imperial support for recruitment of soldiers for Spain. During the brief papacy of Innocent IX, Caetani had requested that he be transferred to Spain, and Clement VIII agreed to his wishes, allowing him to leave Prague on 10 July 1592 and return to Rome in late August.

== Mission to Madrid ==
By family tradition the Caetani had political sympathies with Spain, so Camillo's appointment as nuncio to Madrid on 20 September 1592 was very welcome. He arrived in Barcelona on 13 January 1593 and reached Madrid on 9 February, accompanied by his nephews Gregorio and Benedetto (both of whom died in Spain) and had his first audience with Philip II five days later. Caetani reported that 'Although the king is old and constantly sick ... he wants to be involved in all business matters [and] he consults few people before he embarks on prolonged, difficult and dangerous affairs.' In the final years of Philip's reign, Caetani was the only diplomat who still received personal audiences with the king.

In Madrid, Caetani's main tasks were to ensure that the Tridentine reforms were enacted and the benefit of clergy preserved. He also encouraged Philip to provide generous funding for universities, seminaries, and those afflicted by the Eighty Years' War. He also strove to build an alliance of all Catholic states against the Ottoman Empire. Caetani was assisted in his mission by two papal diplomats: Camillo Borghese in 1594 and Giovanni Francesco Aldobrandini, nephew of the pope, in 1595. His diplomatic efforts were undermined by the rapprochement of Pope Clement VIII with Henry IV of France, who had converted to Catholicism in 1593.

Caetani was also instructed to take a very cautious line with Spain's aggressive inclinations towards England. He was critical of the Spanish attacks on shipping carrying alum (essential for the cloth industry) from Tolfa, near Rome, and of the restrictions Spain placed on the movement of grain from Sicily to the Papal States. He also worked to secure Spanish support for the incorporation of Ferrara into the Papal States. His most successful initiatives were in the field of censorship through the Index librorum prohibitorum. In 1593 he obtained the arrest and eventual removal to Rome, of Juan Roa Dávila, author of Apologia de iuribus principalibus which argued for the authority of the secular power in church affairs. Not all ecclesiastical matters were easily resolved however: in 1594, Madrid quashed the papal bull De largitione munerum, one of a number of papal bulls rejected by the Spanish government. Likewise, appeals from the clergy in Spain to the Roman Rota against the decisions of secular courts were prohibited, and Caetani had to pursue long and exhausting disputes to preserve Papal rights in Spain, from which substantial revenues accrued – for example, in the case of the rich inheritance of the Cardinal of Toledo. He was eventually successful in reaching a compromise on church matters, approved by Clement VIII in 1599.

As early as 1594 Caetani's position was seriously compromised following a campaign of orchestrated accusations by Spanish circles in Rome and papal diplomats in Spain, accusing him of abuse of power, excessive spending, neglect of his duties, accepting bribes, and abusing his own staff. He was not recalled from his post however, partly because the rivalry between the pope's nephews Cinzio Passeri Aldobrandini and Pietro Aldobrandini was so intense that neither could be appointed to succeed him. Having survived this threat, Caetani was able to secure the position of collector of the diezmo in Spain, and, for a while, in Portugal as well. Caetani needed to draw around 145,000 scudi from his revenue to fund his nunciature, as the debts of the Caetani house were so heavy (330,000 scudi in 1592). These financial circumstances compelled Caetani to constantly ask the court in Madrid for pensions, benefits and offices for his relatives, and this in turn inclined him to be amenable to Spanish diplomatic interests. Through his friendship with Philip III's favourite the Duke of Lerma, Caetani was able to secure for his nephew Bonifacio the bishopric of Cassano and the Order of the Golden Fleece for his nephew Pietro in 1600. Caetani's efforts to secure for himself the archbishoprics first of Milan and then of Naples were however unsuccessful.

== Final years ==
Following the death of his brother cardinal Enrico Caetani in 1599, Camillo was recalled to the Curia. After handing over to his successor Domenico Ginnasio, Caetani left Madrid in early April 1600 and arrived in Rome in early June. Now the senior member of his family, he devoted himself almost exclusively to its welfare and to improving its finances, transferring to his nephews almost all of his pension and benefits. His aspirations to become a cardinal were unmet when he died after a short illness, in Rome, on the night of 5–6 January 1602. He was buried in the family chapel in Santa Pudenziana. His memorial, designed by Carlo Maderno, was later adapted for another family member.
