= Giovanni Emo (bishop) =

17th-century Roman Catholic bishop

Most Reverend Giovanni Emo
- Bishop of Bergamo
- Church: Catholic Church
- Diocese: Diocese of Bergamo
- In office: 1611–1622
- Predecessor: Giambattista Milani
- Successor: Federico Baldissera Bartolomeo Cornaro

Orders
- Consecration: 24 May 1611 by Giovanni Delfino

Personal details
- Born: 4 May 1565 Venice, Italy
- Died: 16 Oct 1622 (age 57)

Giovanni Emo (1565–1622) was a Roman Catholic prelate who served as Bishop of Bergamo (1611–1622).

== Biography ==
Giovanni Emo was born in Venice, Italy. On 18 Apr 1611, he was appointed during the papacy of Pope Paul V as Bishop of Bergamo. On 24 May 1611, he was consecrated bishop by Giovanni Delfino, Cardinal-Priest of San Marco, with Marco Cornaro, Bishop of Padua, and Luca Stella, Bishop of Rethymo, serving as co-consecrators. He served as Bishop of Bergamo until his death on 16 Oct 1622.

== External links and additional sources ==
- Cheney, David M. "Diocese of Bergamo". Catholic-Hierarchy.org. (for Chronology of Bishops) ^{[self-published]}
- Chow, Gabriel. "Diocese of Bergamo (Italy)". GCatholic.org. (for Chronology of Bishops) ^{[self-published]}

Catholic Church titles
Preceded by Giambattista Milani	Bishop of Bergamo; 1611–1622	Succeeded by Federico Baldissera Bartolomeo Cornaro
