= Diocese of Limassol =

The Diocese of Limassol or Diocese of Nemosia (Latin: Dioecesis Nimociensis seu Limosiensis) or Diocese of Limassol was a Roman Catholic diocese in Cyprus, in the city of Limassol. It was suppressed in the 16th century after the Ottoman conquest of Cyprus.

== Resident bishops ==
- Leontius, Greek bishop of the 7th century
- T. (fl. 1200–1203)
- Fulk of Montaigu (fl. 1211–1219)
- R. (fl. 1220–1222)
- T. (fl. 1230–1236)
- G. (fl. 1249)
  Bartholomew of Breganze, administrator in 1252–1255
  Opizzo Fieschi, administrator in 1256–1280
- Hubert (1280 – before 1288)
- Berard (before 1288 – 1300)
- Anthony of Saurano (1300–1301), elected, never confirmed
- Peter Erlant (1301 – before 1313)
- Hugh of Béduin (1314)
- John (fl. 1315–1320)
- William (1322–1324), elected, never confirmed
  Peter of Genouillac, administrator in 1322–1324
  Raymond Béguin, administrator in 1324–1328
- Bartholomew (1329), elected, never confirmed
  Peter de la Palud, administrator in 1329–1337
- Lamberto Balduino della Cecca (1337–1344)
- Itier of Nabinaux (1344–1346)
- Francis of Arezzo (1346–1351)
- Léger of Nabinaux (1351–1353)
- Elias of Chamberlhac (1353–1357)
- Guy of Ibelin (1357–1367)
- Adhémar de la Voulte (1367–1374)
- Tommaso Ammanati (1374–1379)

Avignon obedience
- John Stinus (1380–1403)
- William Scarbotti (1403–1406/7)
- William Gralli (1407–1411)
- Anthony (1411 – after 1417)

Roman obedience
- Francis (1380–1389)
- Stephen I Governus (1389–1390)
- Bartholomew Gay (1390 – after 1393)

- Lancelot of Lusignan (fl. 1434)
- Galesius of Montolif (1438–1442)
- James Badini de Nores (fl. 1443)
- Galesius of Montolif (1447–1456/1457), second time
- Peter de Manatiis (1456/7–1460)
- Anthony de Zucco (1460–1479)
- Nicolò Donà (1479–1493)
- Nicola Dolce (1493–1514)
- Marco Cornaro (4 April 1514 – 22 March 1516), held in commendam
- Paolo Borgasio (22 Mar 1516 – 1539), resigned
- Andrea Zantani (14 Jul 1539 –), appointed
- Andrea Mocenigo (19 Jun 1562 – 1569), died in offace
- Serafino Fortibraccia, O.P. (24 Jan 1569 – 1571), died in office at the siege of Famagusta

== Titular bishops ==
- Stefano Lusignan, O.P. (27 Apr 1588 –)

== See also ==
- Catholic Church in Cyprus
