= Gianfrancesco Ugoni =

Roman Catholic prelate

Most Reverend Gianfrancesco Ugoni
- Bishop of Famagusta
- Church: Catholic Church
- Diocese: Diocese of Famagusta
- In office: 1530–1543
- Predecessor: Mattia Ugoni
- Successor: Filippo Bona

Personal details
- Died: 1543 Famagusta, Cyprus

Gianfrancesco Ugoni was a Roman Catholic prelate who served as Bishop of Famagusta (1530–1543).

== Biography ==
On 10 January 1530, Gianfrancesco Ugoni was appointed during the papacy of Pope Clement VII as Bishop of Famagusta. In February 1530, he was consecrated bishop by Paolo Zane, Bishop of Brescia; and Mattia Ugoni, Bishop Emeritus of Famagusta. He served as Bishop of Famagusta until his death in 1543.

== External links and additional sources ==
- Cheney, David M. "Diocese of Famagusta". Catholic-Hierarchy.org. (for Chronology of Bishops) ^{[self-published]}
- Chow, Gabriel. "Titular Episcopal See of Famagusta (Italy)". GCatholic.org. (for Chronology of Bishops) ^{[self-published]}

Catholic Church titles
Preceded by Mattia Ugoni	Bishop of Famagusta; 1530–1543	Succeeded by Filippo Bona
