= Mattia Ugoni =

Roman Catholic prelate

Most Reverend Mattia Ugoni
- Bishop of Famagusta
- Church: Catholic Church
- Diocese: Diocese of Famagusta
- In office: 1504–1529
- Predecessor: Marco Cornaro
- Successor: Gianfrancesco Ugoni

Mattia Ugoni was a Roman Catholic prelate who was Bishop of Famagusta from 1504 to 1529.

== Biography ==
Mattia Ugoni was appointed Bishop of Famagusta on 1 July 1504, during the papacy of Pope Julius II. He resigned in 1529.

== Episcopal succession ==
While bishop, he was the principal co-consecrator of Gianfrancesco Ugoni, Bishop of Famagusta (1530), and Pietro Lippomano, Bishop of Bergamo (1530).

== External links and additional sources ==
- Cheney, David M. "Diocese of Famagusta". Catholic-Hierarchy.org. (for Chronology of Bishops) ^{[self-published]}
- Chow, Gabriel. "Titular Episcopal See of Famagusta (Italy)". GCatholic.org. (for Chronology of Bishops) ^{[self-published]}

Catholic Church titles
Preceded by Marco Cornaro	Bishop of Famagusta; 1504–1529	Succeeded by Gianfrancesco Ugoni
