= Gerolamo Gradenigo =

- Patriarch of Aquileia
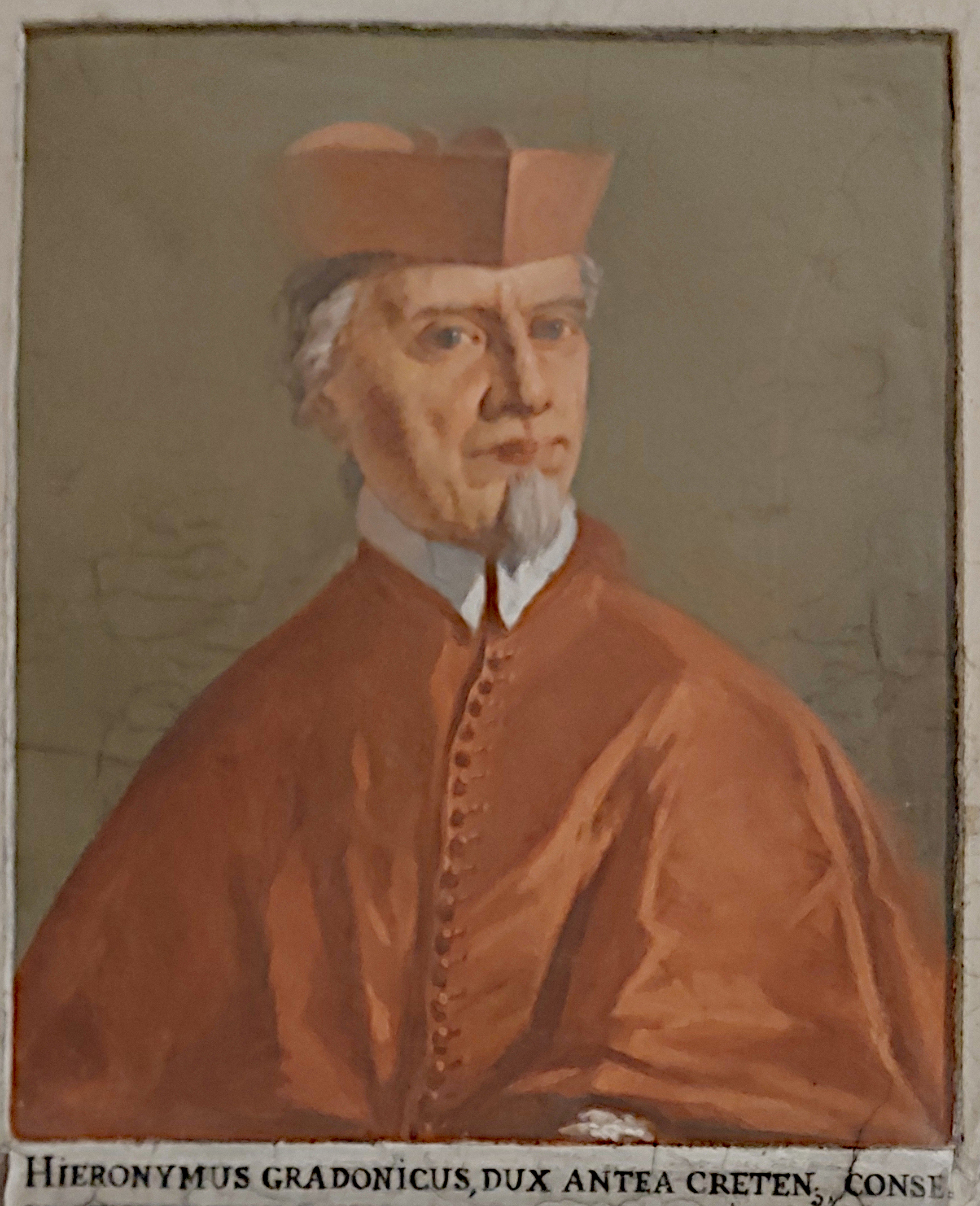
- Church: Catholic Church
- See: Patriarchate of Aquileia
- Appointed: 16 February 1656
- Term ended: 19 December 1657
- Predecessor: Marco Gradenigo
- Successor: Giovanni Delfino

Orders
- Consecration: 21 September 1646 (Bishop) by Marco Antonio Martinengo

Personal details
- Born: August 1597
- Died: 19 December 1657 (aged 60)
- Buried: San Clemente, Venice

Gerolamo Gradenigo (Latin: Hieronymus Gradonicus 1597 – 1657) was Patriarch of Aquileia from 1656 to 1657.

== Life ==
Gerolamo Gradenigo was born probably in Venice in August 1597 to the Gradenigo family, one of the noblest among the Venetian aristocracy, son of Giovanni Giacomo. He took the ecclesiastic life and became Primicerio (i.e. first priest of the canons) of the cathedral of Candia.

His older brother, Marco Gradenigo, has been appointed in 1629 Patriarch of Aquileia, and since 1641 he asked the Pope to appoint his brother Gerolamo as his coadjutor bishop with the right of succession, as usual for that Patriarchate in order to exclude any appointments by the Holy Roman Emperor. The appointment as coadjutor bishop of Aquileia, with the formal title of bishop of Madaurus, occurred on 25 April 1645. He received the episcopal consecration in the monastic church of Santa Maria degli Angeli, Murano on 21 September 1646 by the hands of the bishop of Torcello Marco Antonio Martinengo. On 6 July 1654 his title was changed in titular bishop of Famagusta.

At the death of his brother Marco, on 16 February 1656, Gerolamo became immediately Patriarch of Aquileia. Already on 16 March 1656 the new patriarch asked the pope to appoint his relative Giovanni Delfino as coadjutor bishop of Aquileia, a request which was accepted on 23 June.

Gerolamo Gradenigo died on 19 December 1657, and was buried in the church of San Clemente in Venice.
