= Doub =

French family

The Doub family is believed to be a French family that emigrated from the Moselle region of France, in the time of the revocation of the Edict of Nantes (1685), and settled in Germany.

There are several branches of the Doub family, but the two earliest branches are the Maryland Doubs and the North Carolina Doubs.

A Doub family member, John Nicholas Daub (or Taub), came with his wife and family to the New World in 1752, spreading widely in mid-Atlantic colonial America.

- John Nicholas Doub (March 19, 1722, Minfeld, Rhineland-Palatinate – 1790, Frederick County, Maryland). He was the ninth and last child of Hans Ludwig Daub (1677 – October 2, 1730, Minfeld) and Maria Juliana Gros. He married (February 7, 1741) to Anna Maria König.
- Anna Maria König (July 31, 1718, Minfeld, Rhineland-Palatinate – before 1790, Frederick County, Maryland), wife of John Nicholas Doub, was the daughter of Frantz König and Rahel Bucke.
- :They came from Germany to Frederick Co. with three children:
  - Johann Jacob Doub (February 27, 1744, Minfeld – 1824, Frederick Co).
  - Maria Elizabeth (May 21, 1746, Minfeld – September 28, 1765, Frederick Co); married to Valentine Lingenfelter.
  - Catharine Magdalena (born June 8, 1749, Minfeld).
- :Their fourth child, Maria Magdalena (born January 22, 1756) in Frederick Co., Maryland.

Another Doub, Johan Doub, was born March 27, 1742, in Littfred (now Kreutzal), Germany. He married Mary Eve Spainhour, daughter of Jacobus Wernhardt Spainhour and Elizabeth Lohner, and died October 20, 1814, in Vienna, Forsyth Co., North Carolina.

== Maryland Doubs ==
John Jacob Doub (aka Jacob) (February 27, 1744 – 1824) was born in Minfeld, and moved to the new world with his parents, John Nicholas Doub and Anna Maria König. He then moved into Maryland from Pennsylvania, and died in Frederick Co., Maryland. The Maryland branch settled first in Frederick, Maryland, then further into frontier Maryland, starting in the early 18th century. Several early Doubs were active land speculators in Frederick, and their names are mentioned on many colonial-era deeds. Jacob Doub married Louisa Bowlus (Paulus) (February 2, 1750 – December 30, 1817), who was born in Frederick Co., Maryland, daughter of Andreas Bowlus and Anna Maria his wife, and who died at Middleton, Frederick Co. Together they had seven sons, and two daughters, Rosanna and Catherine:

- (John) George (1774–1858), who went west and settled in Louisville, Kentucky. He had a son, John Doup (born 1799) and two daughters, Lydia Elizabeth (1801–1888), who married her first cousin Daniel; Elizabeth (1814–1878).
- John (1781–1854) who settled at Beaver Creek.
- (John) Jacob (1771–1738) settled near Myersville, Maryland, on the Eldridge farm, and is buried in the old Jerusalem graveyard. He had six sons: John (died a young man), Daniel (who went west), George (lived near Hyersvill, and had a son Isaih), Jacob (who went west and became a Methodist minister, and had one daughter), Jonathan (settled in Washington Co, in the area of Hagerstown) and David (bachelor who lived and died near Myersville); and daughters: Elizabeth (1804–1857) Mrs John Harp, and Catherine (1807–1859) Mrs Joseph Bowlus.
- (John) Abraham (1777–1853) settled near Myersville. He married a Miss Catherine Thomas from Washington Co, Maryland, and had eight children: Joel (1806–1893, settled near Chewsville, Wash. Co, Maryland), Enos (1806–1896, married Elizabeth Sheffer), Ezra (1814–1892, married Annie Eyler and settled near Boonesboro, Maryland), Samuel (1812–1837, married a Miss Tom and Settled near Bonnesboro, Maryland), Elizabeth (1806–1844, who died young), Mary (1819–1892, married David Eyler of Thurmont, Maryland), Catherine (married Joel Schlosser, Boonesboro, Maryland) and Lydia (18810-1863, died single).
- Valentine married a Miss Kemp, and settled near Frederick, Maryland, on the Miller farm, where a number of the family is buried. They had three sons: Joshua, Ezra and Valentine. Joshua had sons (William and Valentine) and a daughter, Mrs William B. McCleery, in Frederick, Maryland. Ezra had one son, Wilton, who went to California. Valentine had one son, Charles.
- Henerey (Henry) went west, and is the father of the Ohio Doubs.
- Frederick died young, leaving a wife and a daughter.

Maryland Doub family members were active in the taming of the Western Maryland frontier, and played a prominent role in the agriculture, economy, and politics of Washington County, Maryland, from the earliest days of the county. An Ezra Doub ran for the Maryland legislature in 1841 on the Whig ticket, and lost.

John Doub was born (February 27, 1781) in Frederick Co, Maryland. He married (1804) Catharine Routzahn (1786 – September 15, 1856, Beaver Creek). They settled at Beaver Creek, Wahs. Co, Maryland, two and a half miles south of Middletown. John and Catherine Doub had nine children, seven sons and two daughters:

- Samuel (1806–1872) married (1832) Lydia Stouffer. He lived near Keedysville where he died. They had but one son, Frisby, who died as a bachelor.
- Elizabeth (1809–1873) married (1833) Samuel C. Stouffer.
- Jonathan (1811–1863) settled near Beaver Creek, and married (1838) Catherine Rinehart. They had two sons, Jelty and Daniel, and one daughter who married Lawson Harp.
- John (1815–1880) died as a bachelor.
- Catherine (1819–1892) married (1841) Andrew Funk.
- Jacob (1821–1827) died in childhood.
- Mary (1824–1888) was not married.
- Philip Routzhan (1825–1891) lived and died at the home place. He married (1854) Cornelia Witmer. Their children are Lewis P., Daniel J. (lawyer in Wagerstown), Albert (lawyer in Cumberland, father of George Cochran Doub), Franck and Mrs Summers. Lewis P. And Frank owned the Mill property at Beaver Creek.
- Caroline (1830–1871 married (1852) Henry Eakle.

John Doub died (August 25, 1854) in Beaver Creek, Washington Co., Maryland. The Doub's Mill, the Doub's Mill Historic District (Beaver Creek Maryland) and the Doub Farm in Keedysville are named after him.

Another Doub family farm in Boonsboro, Maryland, was reportedly used as a field headquarters during the Battle of Antietam; the family had fled the battlefield and taken refuge in the western Maryland hills.

== Notable Doub family members ==
- Rev. Peter Doub (1796–1869), early North Carolina Methodist preacher and advocate of women's education, Peter Doub was one of three founders of Greensboro Female College. He was the son of Johan Doub, native of Germany, and Mrs. Mary Eve Spainhour Doub, of Swiss parentage.
- Ezra Doub (1814 – c. 1892), Frederick, then Boonsboro, landowner and Whig candidate for Maryland House of Representatives, 1841. Justice of peace for the Frederick County, 1845
- Samuel Doub (February 1806 – August 2, 1872), builder of the Doub Farm in 1851. Married to Lydia Stouffer (c. 1831), his son Frisby was born January 1, 1844.
- Albert Alvin Doub Sr. (born 1865), 1915 Republican candidate for Attorney General of Maryland (defeated by Albert Ritchie), later Circuit Court Judge, Alleghany County Maryland (born 1921).
- Emma Katie Doub (1876–1955), Maryland educator, donated the Doub's Woods to Washington County and owned the land where the "Emma K Doub School for Integrated Arts & Technology" has been built and is named after her.
- George Cochran Doub (1902–1981), son of Albert A. Doub and Anne Cochran, United States Attorney for the District of Maryland (1953–1956), US District Court; then Assistant Attorney General of the United States (1956–60).
- George Cochran Doub III (1963-), son of George Cochran Doub, Jr. and Mary Worthington Tyler, prominent international maritime attorney.
- Janet Doub Erickson (born Janet Ann Doub, 1924), founder of the Blockhouse of Boston, artist & author. Great-granddaughter of Ezra Doub (1814-1892)
- William Offutt Doub (1931–2015), pioneer in environmental and energy law, former Atomic Energy Commissioner (1971–74). Son of Albert Alvin Doub jr. (died 1977), attorney; grandson of judge Albert Alvin Doub Sr.
- J. Peyton Doub (1960-), environmental scientist and author, senior staff scientist with US Nuclear Regulatory Commission, son of William Doub
- Albert A. Doub (1963-), international energy expert with US Energy Association, son of William Doub
- Sophy Burnham (Born Sophy Doub) (1936-), author of fifteen books, including "A Book of Angels." daughter of George C. Doub.

== See also ==
- Doub Farm
- Karl Daub (1765–1836), professor at the University of Heidelberg
