= Apostolic Nunciature to Cologne =

Former diplomatic post of the Holy See (1584–1804)

The Apostolic Nunciature to Cologne (also Italian: Nunziatura di Germania inferiore, i.e. Nunciature of Lower Germany) was an ecclesiastical office of the Roman Catholic Church established in 1584. The nuncios were accredited to the Archbishop-Electorates of Cologne, Mainz and Trier. It was a diplomatic post of the Holy See, whose representative was called the Apostolic Nuncio at Cologne, one of the states of the Holy Roman Empire. The office of the nunciature was located in Cologne until 1795, when France occupied the city. The last nuncio, officiating until 1804, resided in Augsburg, while the Archbishop-Electorate had been dissolved in 1803.

Two nuncios and one apostolic delegate at Cologne later became popes: Pope Urban VII, Pope Alexander VII and Pope Leo XII.

== History ==
An apostolic nuncio at Cologne was appointed in 1584 on the instigation of Emperor Rudolph II of the Holy Roman Empire. Following the Council of Trient, apostolic delegates had already been appointed at Cologne in order to contain the spreading of Protestantism in the Empire. The Archbishop-Electorate of Cologne was chosen for being a stronghold of Catholicism in the northwest of the Empire in vicinity to areas where Calvinism (Bremen, Dutch Republic, East Frisia, Lippe) and Lutheranism (elsewhere in Northern Germany) were gaining more and more support. The Rhenish Archbishop-Electorates were further important as providing already three of the then-seven votes within the election body for the imperial successors.

The political role of the apostolic nuncio at Cologne was essential for participating in some events of political life of the Empire such as the imperial diets (in 1594 and 1622) and the imperial elections in Frankfurt upon Main (in 1612 and 1658). The nuncio also participated in the negotiations of the Peace of Westphalia (1644-1648) in Münster and Osnabrück, ending the Thirty Years' War, the Treaty of Aix-la-Chapelle (1668), Cologne's abandon in the Franco-Dutch War (1673-1674), and the Peace of Utrecht (1713).

Besides Cologne, Mainz, and Trier, the nuncios could wield their jurisdiction undisputedly for the prince-bishoprics of Hildesheim, Liège, Osnabrück, Paderborn, and Würzburg. In 1596, the Low Countries (Netherlands) were detached from the nunciature of Cologne, receiving their own nuncio in Brussels.

On the instigation of Charles Theodore, Elector of Bavaria, another nunciature was established by Pope Pius VI in Munich. This caused a conflict between the nunciature at Cologne and the Apostolic Nunciature to Bavaria as to their competences. The appointment of Giulio Cesare Zoglio as Bavarian nuncio angered the archbishop-electors of Cologne, Mainz, and Trier, who considered the nuncio to Cologne to be competent for all the Empire. Joseph II, Holy Roman Emperor, sided with the electors, and declared he would recognise nuncios in their "political character" only. The nunciature at Cologne ceased to exist in 1804. After the Congress of Vienna, the nunciature was not reestablished, while the Bavarian nunciature, also interrupted in 1800 during the Napoleonic Wars, resurged in 1818 and persisted until 1934. Germany as a whole concluded diplomatic ties with the Holy See on 1 May 1920, establishing the Apostolic Nunciature to Germany.

== Apostolic delegates at Cologne ==
- 1520: Hieronymus Aleander
- 1573–1576: Kaspar Gropper, ranked nuncio
- 1576–1578: Bartolomeo Portia
- 1578–1579: Giovanni Battista Castagna, future Pope Urban VII
- 1583: Minutio Minucci
- 1583: Giovanni Francesco Bonomi, Bishop of Vercelli

== Apostolic nuncios at Cologne ==
- 1584–1587: Giovanni Francesco Bonomi (= Bonhomini), Bishop of Vercelli
- 1587–1596: Ottavio Mirto Frangipani, bishop of Cajazzo, bishop of Tricarico since 1592
- 1593/98–1606: Coriolano Garzadoro, Bishop of Ossero
- 1606–1610: Attilio Amalteo, archbishop of the titulature of Athens
- 1610–1621: Antonio Albergati, bishop of Bisceglie
- 1621–1624: Pietro Francesco Montoro, bishop of Nicastro
- 1624–1634: Pier Luigi Carafa, bishop of Tricarico
- 1634–1639: Martino Alfieri, archbishop of Isola, Archbishop of Cosenza since 1639
- 1639–1651: Fabio Chigi, bishop of Nardò, future Pope Alexander VII
- 1651–1659: Giuseppe Maria Sanfelice, archbishop of Cosenza
- 1659–1666: Marco Galli, bishop of Rimini
- 1666–1670: Agostino Franciotti, archbishop of the titulature of Trapezunt
- 1670–1672: Francesco Buonvisi, archbishop of the titulature of Thessalonica, later Nuncio to Poland and Austria, cardinal
- 1672–1680: Opizio Pallavicini, archbishop of the titulature of Ephesus
- 1680–1687 Ercole Visconti, archbishop of the titulature of Damietta
- 1687–1690: Sebastiano Antonio Tanara, archbishop of the titulature of Damascus
- 1690–1696: Gianantonio Davia, archbishop of the titulature of Thebae
- 1696–1698: Fabrizio Paolucci di Calboli, Bishop of Macerata and Tolentino, Archbishop of Ferrara since 1698, future Cardinal Bishop of Ostia
- 1698–1702: Orazio Filippo Spada, archbishop of the titulature of Thebae
- 1703–1706: Giulio Piazza, archbishop of the titulature of Rodi
- 1706–1712: Giambattista Bussi, archbishop of the titulature of Tarsos
- 1712/13-1721: Girolamo Archinto, archbishop of the titulature of Tarsos
- 1721–1722: Vincenzo Santini, archbishop of the titulature of Trapezunt
- 1722–1732: Gaetano de'Cavalieri, archbishop of the titulature of Tarsos
- 1732–1735: Jacopo Oddi, archbishop of the titulature of Laodicea
- 1735–1738: Fabrizio Serbelloni, archbishop of the titulature of Patrasso
- 1740–1744: Ignazio Michele Crivelli, archbishop of the titulature of Caesarea
- 1744–1754: Girolamo Spinola, archbishop of the titulature of Laodicea
- 1754–1760: Niccolò Oddi, archbishop of the titulature of Trajanopolis
- 1760–1767: Cesare Alberico Lucini, archbishop of the titulature of Nicaea
- 1766/67–1775: Giovanni Battista Caprara Montecuccoli, archbishop of the titulature of Iconium, nuncio to Vienna and Paris, later archbishop of Milano and cardinal
- 1775–1785: Carlo Antonio Giuseppe Bellisomi, archbishop of the titulature of Tyana, Nuncio to Portugal
- 1786–1794: Bartolomeo Pacca, archbishop of the titulature of Damiette
- 1794–1804: Annibale della Genga, archbishop of the titulature of Tyrus, last nuncio to Cologne and future Pope Leo XII, due to the French occupation and annexation of Cologne (1795, 1801) last officiating from Augsburg

== Literature ==
- Michael F. Feldkamp, "Die Erforschung der Kölner Nuntiatur: Geschichte und Ausblick. Mit einem Verzeichnis der Amtsdaten der Nuntien und Administratoren (Interimsverwalter) der Kölner Nuntiatur (1584–1794)", in: Archivum Historiae Pontificiae, Pontif. Univ. Gregoriana (ed.), vol. 28 (1990), pp. 201–283.
- Michael F. Feldkamp, Studien und Texte zur Geschichte der Kölner Nuntiatur: 4 vols., vol. 1: 'Die Kölner Nuntiatur und ihr Archiv. Eine archiv- und quellenkundliche Untersuchung' (1993; ISBN 978-88-85042-22-3); vol. 2: 'Dokumente und Materialien über Jurisdiktion, Nuntiatursprengel, Haushalt, Zeremoniell und Verwaltung der Kölner Nuntiatur (1584–1794)' (1995; ISBN 978-88-85042-21-6); vol. 3: 'Inventar des Fonds »Archivio della Nunziatura di Colonia« im Vatikanischen Archiv' (1995; ISBN 978-88-85042-27-8); vol. 4: 'Die Instruktionen und Finalrelationen der Kölner Nuntien von 1651 bis 1786' (2008; ISBN 978-88-85042-51-3), (=Collectanea Archivi Vaticani, vols. 30–33), Città del Vaticano: Archivio Vaticano, 1993–2008.
- Nuntiaturberichte aus Deutschland, nebst ergänzenden Aktenstücken: Die Kölner Nuntiatur: so far 20 vols., edited on behalf of the Preussisches Historisches Institut (Roma; now Deutsches Historisches Institut), Görres-Gesellschaft zur Pflege der Wissenschaft, and Akademie der Wissenschaften (Vienna), Paderborn et al.: Schöningh, 1895 to present.
