= Apostolic Nunciature to Bavaria =

Diplomatic post of the Holy See

The Apostolic Nunciature to Bavaria was an ecclesiastical office of the Roman Catholic Church in Bavaria. It was a diplomatic post of the Holy See, whose representative was called the Apostolic Nuncio to Bavaria, a state – consecutively during the nunciature's existence – of the Holy Roman Empire, of its own sovereignty, and then of Imperial, Weimar and finally Nazi Germany. The office of the nunciature was located in Munich from 1785 to 1936. Prior to this, there was one nunciature in the Holy Roman Empire, which was the nunciature in Cologne, accredited to the Archbishop-Electorates of Cologne, Mainz and Trier.

== History ==
A new nunciature was established by Pope Pius VI in Munich in 1785, requested by Charles Theodore, Elector of Bavaria. The appointment of Giulio Cesare Zoglio as nuncio angered the archbishop-electors of Cologne, Mainz, and Trier, who considered the Nuncio to Cologne to be competent for all the Empire. Joseph II, Holy Roman Emperor sided with the electors, and declared he would recognise nuncios in their "political character" only. Thus, there were two nuncios: one in Cologne, and one in Munich, the division of whose jurisdictions was a matter of contention.

With the Archbishop-Electorates of Cologne, Mainz, and Trier occupied by France and dissolved in 1795 and 1803, respectively, the last nuncio to Cologne, Annibale della Genga, had to reside in Augsburg, which was annexed to Bavaria in 1803. With the dissolution of the Empire in 1806 Bavaria gained full sovereignty, and the tradition of the nuncio to Cologne was continued by the nuncio to Austria in Vienna, competent for the Empire of Austria only.

In the years 1800–1818 the nunciature was suppressed due to Napoléon's pressure on the Vatican. However, after the Bavarian Concordat (1817) the ties were revitalised in 1818. Thus Austria and the Kingdom of Bavaria maintained their separate relations to the Pope, also after both had joined the German Confederation in 1815, which was no state, but a mere confederacy. Whereas the prevailingly Lutheran or Calvinist German states within the confederacy, disestablished in 1866, had no diplomatic ties with the Holy See. None of the states of the North German Confederation, a confederacy without Austria and Southern Germany, had ties to the Vatican. When most German states, but not Austria, merged with the North German Confederation in order to form the federal united German Empire in 1871, Bavaria was the only member state with a nunciature. This was part of the Reservatrechte where Bavaria was permitted to retain its diplomatic network after the formation of the unified Germany in 1871.

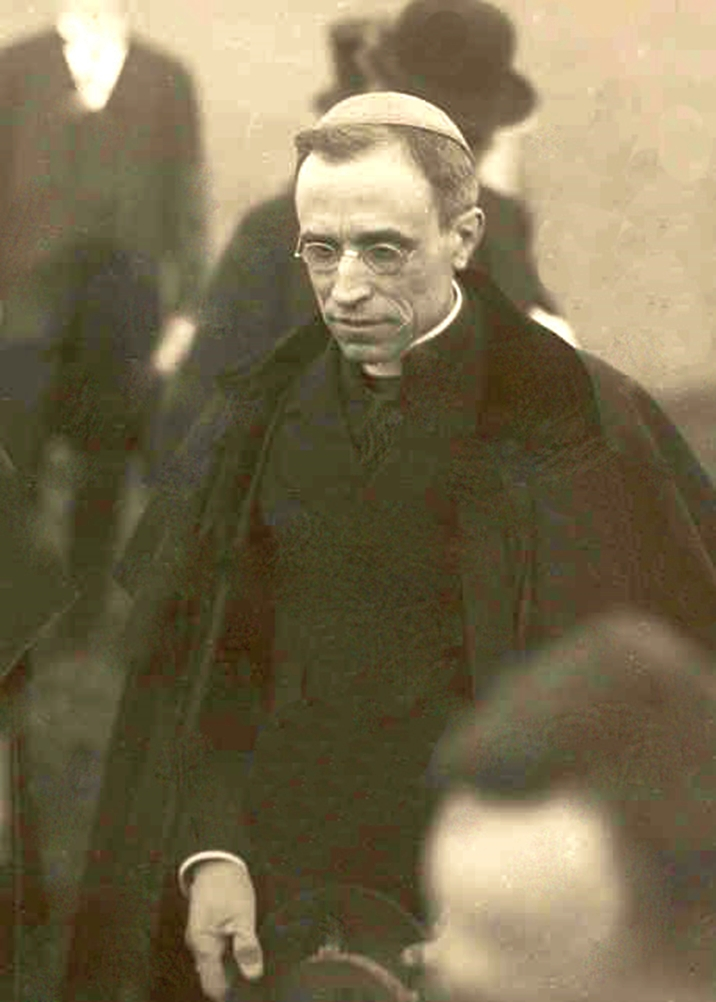
Eugenio Pacelli (future Pope Pius XII), the penultimate nuncio to Bavaria.

When the Bavarian monarchy became the Free State of Bavaria after the abdication of the king, like all German monarchies and the Empire became republics, the diplomatic ties continued as German states are generally allowed to have foreign relationships. In 1920 Germany concluded formal diplomatic ties with the Vatican, so that Eugenio Pacelli, Nuncio to Bavaria, was appointed the first nuncio to Germany in personal union. However, the nunciature to Germany remained seated in Munich, since Berlin, simultaneously the capital of Germany and Prussia, was located in the latter, not holding official ties with the Holy See. Pacelli concluded the new Bavarian Concordat (1924) with the Free State.

In 1925 the Free State of Prussia, the biggest German state, concluded diplomatic relations with the Vatican, so that Pacelli resigned as Nuncio to Bavaria in order to become the first nuncio to Prussia in personal union with nuncio to Germany, opening a nunciature in Berlin. He then negotiated the Prussian Concordat (1930), before he was appointed Cardinal Secretary of State negotiating the Reichskonkordat, finally concluded with Nazi Germany in 1933.

When the streamlining Nazi Gleichschaltung did formally away with statehood of the German states and established a centralised dictatorship in 1934, Bavaria was not to hold diplomatic ties of its own any more. While Pacelli managed to continue the nunciature to Bavaria as a kind of outpost of the nunciature to Germany, the Nazi government prompted the expulsion of the last nuncio to Bavaria in 1936.

== Nuncios to Bavaria ==
- Giulio Cesare Zoglio (10 December 1785 – 13 April 1795)
- Emidio Ziucci (12 January 1796 – 1800)
- 1800–1804 united nuncio to Germany and Bavaria (see above)
- 1804-1817: vacancy
- Francesco Serra Casano (26 November 1817 – 3 July 1826)
- Carlo Giuseppe Benedetto Mercy d'Argenteau (3 October 1826 – 27 April 1837)
- Michele Viale-Prelà (9 August 1838 – 27 May 1845)
- Carlo Morichini (April 1845 – 2 August 1847)
- Carlo Sacconi (13 November 1847 – 28 September 1853)
- Antonio De Luca (19 December 1853 – 16 June 1856)
- Flavio Chigi (16 June 1856 – 30 September 1861)
- Matteo Eustachio Gonella (30 September 1861 – 22 June 1866)
- Pier Francesco Meglia (21 October 1866 – 27 April 1874)
- Angelo Bianchi (13 November 1874 – 15 May 1877)
- Gaetano Aloisi Masella (16 May 1877 – 1 August 1879)
- Cesare Roncetti (28 July 1879 – 13 October 1881)
- Angelo Di Pietro (19 March 1882 – 16 May 1887)
- Fulco Luigi Ruffo-Scilla (16 May 1887 – 20 March 1889)
- Antonio Agliardi (4 April 1889 – 16 May 1893)
- Andrea Aiuti (16 May 1893 – 15 July 1896)
- Benedetto Lorenzelli (10 October 1896 – 8 May 1899)
- Cesare Sambucetti (13 January 1900 – 15 October 1901)
- José Macchi (21 July 1902 – 6 January 1904)
- Carlo Caputo (14 January 1904 – August 1907)
- Andreas Frühwirth, OP (26 October 1907 – 6 December 1915)
- Giuseppe Aversa (4 December 1916 – 12 April 1917)
- Eugenio Pacelli (20 April 1917 – 1925), simultaneously nuncio to Germany (1920–1930) and then nuncio to Prussia (1925–1930)
- Alberto Vassallo-Torregrossa (1925 – 31 May 1934)
