= Doub Farm =

Historic house in Maryland, United States

- U.S. National Register of Historic Places
- Location within Maryland Location within the United States
- Location: North of Keedysville, Maryland
- Coordinates: 39°29′53″N 77°41′54″W
- Area: 149 acres (60 ha)
- Built: 1851
- NRHP reference No.: 78001486
- Added to NRHP: November 15, 1978

The Doub Farm is a historic home and farm near Keedysville, Maryland, United States. The house is a two-story, seven-bay brick structure set on low fieldstone foundations. The property includes a small brick wash house, a row of board-and-batten outbuildings, a large stone end bank barn, a frame corn crib and wagon shed, and lime kiln. The kiln is still in good condition with its circular lining of header bricks still intact.

The land containing the Doub Farm was purchased in 1832 by John Doub of Doub's Mill in Beaver Creek, Maryland, and given to his son Samuel Doub. Samuel Doub built the current eight-room brick farmhouse in 1851, as evidenced by painted dates in the attic. Samuel's son Frisby Doub owned and lived in the house until 1915. Both Samuel and Frisby were farmers. Frisby Doub died unmarried without children in 1915 and the property passed to the Kline family who had been his caretaker while elderly. The Klines owned the house until sometime in the 1950s or 1960s, when the property was purchased by the US Steel Corporation to use as a stone quarry. The house was subsequently abandoned and fell into disrepair. Economic conditions prevented the stone quarry from being built. William Doub, a great-great-grandson of John Doub, became aware of the property and in 1976 offered to buy it at a low price from US Steel, who no longer had need for the property. Doub and his family restored the house and used it in the subsequent years as a weekend house. The house was lived in by Doub's son, Peyton Doub, from 1992 to 2007 and his other son, Albert Doub, and family currently live in the house. The Doubs currently manage the property for conservation and agriculture, leasing the fields and pastures to Brian Baker, a local farmer.

One key structure on the Doub Farm is a fieldstone lime kiln. The roughly cubical structure measures approximately 15 feet (4.6 m) wide, deep, and tall. It is open on the top. A single narrow doorway provides access to the bottom. It is thought that farmers in the day would shovel fieldstones into the top or through the door and burn them to produce powdered lime to spread in the fields to raise soil pH. The remnants of a road marked by fieldstone berms pass by the bottom of the structure and the door.

Another key structure is a small wooden building situated about 100 feet (30 m) southwest of the house. Doub lore states that Frisby Doub built the structure to live in himself as an old man in the early 1900s, while a caregiver family lived in the farmhouse. The shed-like building contains wood panel interior walls and two glass pane windows. The present Doubs have used it as a storage shed. Albert Doub's son, William Calvert Doub, is presently fixing over this shed to use as a sound studio.

Other outbuilding structures include a brick smokehouse situated just north of the house and a chimney that was likely part of a summer kitchen located just southeast. Peyton Doub remembers that the collapsed remains of the summer kitchen stood until 1976, when his family had the building (except for its chimney) and a pile of litter inside it removed as part of the overall restoration of the property. Other deteriorated buildings removed in 1976 and 1977 include a wooden wagon shed, an outhouse, and a coop-like wooden building that was reportedly used to raise foxes for their urine. Peyton Doub built a brick patio in front of the chimney in 1978, his senior year in high school.

The barn on the property is built of fieldstone. It is a typical banked dairy barn with stalls below and storage above. Rows of parallel slits in the stone sides provide ventilation. The remnants of a long-abandoned milking operation remain in part of the bottom. Curiously, the bottom stall doors include crude carvings that sketch some type of animal. A cornerstone on the north wall of the barn reads 1819. Obviously, a much older house must have once existed near the barn.

The 149-acre (60 ha) property is mostly farmland and pasture. It includes a large number of fieldstone rock walls (stone fences) in excellent condition. Many wooded tree lines and hedgerows follow field lines depicted on old Civil War–era map sketches. The remnants of many old roadways also remain, evidenced by stonework, fences, tree lines, and bridge abutments. The field lines include numerous large black walnut, hackberry, black locust, honey locust, chinquapin oak, and eastern redcedar trees. The western side of the property is a steep hill which old photos from the 1930s show as farmed but which are now wooded. A well-preserved abandoned roadway follows a sunken course along the western perimeter of the property. A few osage orange trees remain near the roadway and drop their large green tennis ball sized fruits on the ground. The eastern part of the property is a roughly 30-acre (12 ha) tract of pasture land that contains multiple scattered small woodlots, most of which surround abrupt rock outcrops of 20 feet (6.1 m) or more. These woodlots, which also show up on 1930s-era aerial photos, are dominated by very large red and white oaks, hickories, and other deciduous trees that may be remnants of virgin tree cover. Several large white ash trees in the woodlots are presently dead or dying from emerald ash borer. Several other areas of rock outcroppings support dense patches of eastern redcedar. The Doub Farm pastures, combined with the similar pastures on the adjoining Baker Farm, provide some of the best remaining grassland bird habitat in a region where much of that habitat has been lost to plowing, urbanization, and forest succession. Many honeylocust trees are scattered throughout the pastures; these thorny trees appear to be favored by cattle that browse competing non-thorny tree saplings.

One key feature of the Doub Farm is an unnamed intermittent stream that flows through the property roughly from north to south, passing close in front of the house and barn. The stream's hydrology reflects the karst topography of the region. The stream is a "losing" stream, with flow being fed by multiple springs emerging from limestone outcrops on the Doub Farm but then losing flow as the stream passes farther from the springs. The stream and adjoining wetlands are typically dry in mid-summer and fall, with streamflow returning with heavier rain and snowmelt events in winter. The stream typically dries out by later June or July. While flowing, the stream and its wetlands attract enormous numbers of Canada geese and occasional great blue herons and American egrets. Great blue herons frequent the stream as it dries down in late spring and large numbers of carp become entrapped in isolated pools of remnant water. The stream flow is much lower than expected for its watershed of more than 1,200 acres (490 ha) north of the Doub Farm. Much of the runoff from the watershed likely flows through underground channels interspersed in the limestone rather than on the surface in the stream. The floodplain associated with the stream is, however, quite broad and episodically carries torrents of rushing waters expected only from much larger streams. Peyton Doub remembers many such events, some breaking away large sections of fencing crossing the stream. A drought in late 2017 and early 2018 left the stream and wetlands dry throughout winter, spring, and early summer of 2018, but unusual mid-summer rain events have kept the stream and wetlands full of running and standing water throughout the normally dry summer months.

The Doub Farm supports abundant wildlife. Large herds of deer are common. "Piebald" deer are occasionally seen. Peyton Doub has noted over the years numerous groundhogs, skunks, possums, cottontail rabbits, red and yellow foxes, and coyotes. Increasing numbers of grey squirrels are present, likely resulting from the many oaks that the Doubs have planted on the property. Doub, an avid birder, has noted most common birds of Maryland on the property. Especially common are northern cardinals, blue jays, eastern bluebirds, northern starlings, house finches, song sparrows, chipping sparrows, northern juncos, Carolina chickadees, eastern phoebes, red bellied woodpeckers, pileated woodpeckers, yellow-bellied sapsuckers, and eastern goldfinches. Indigo bunting and blue grosbeak are also common. Large numbers of turkey vultures often congregate on trees. Red-tailed hawks have established territories in the front pasture. Large clusters of deep groundhog burrows are present, indicative of large underground colonies. Doub also commonly sees wild turkeys and an occasional ring-neck pheasant. Venturing out at night on the Doub Farm one will frequently hear barred owls, great horned owls, and barn owls. Brian Baker, who rents and farms much of the land, has anecdotally spoken of black bears and mountain lions in the area.

The Doub Farm was listed on the National Register of Historic Places in 1978.
