= Bavarian Concordat (1924) =

The Bavarian Concordat is a concordat of 29 March 1924 between the Free State of Bavaria and the Holy See, replacing the concordat with the Kingdom of Bavaria, which had fallen in 1918. Negotiations were led by the Apostolic Nuncio to Bavaria, Eugenio Pacelli, the future pope Pius XII. Under the terms of the art.2 of the Reichskonkordat, the concordat it is still in force.
