= Fulco Luigi Ruffo-Scilla =

Italian Catholic cardinal (1840–1895)

His Eminence Fulco Luigi Ruffo-Scilla
- Prefect of the Prefecture of the Holy Apostolic Palaces
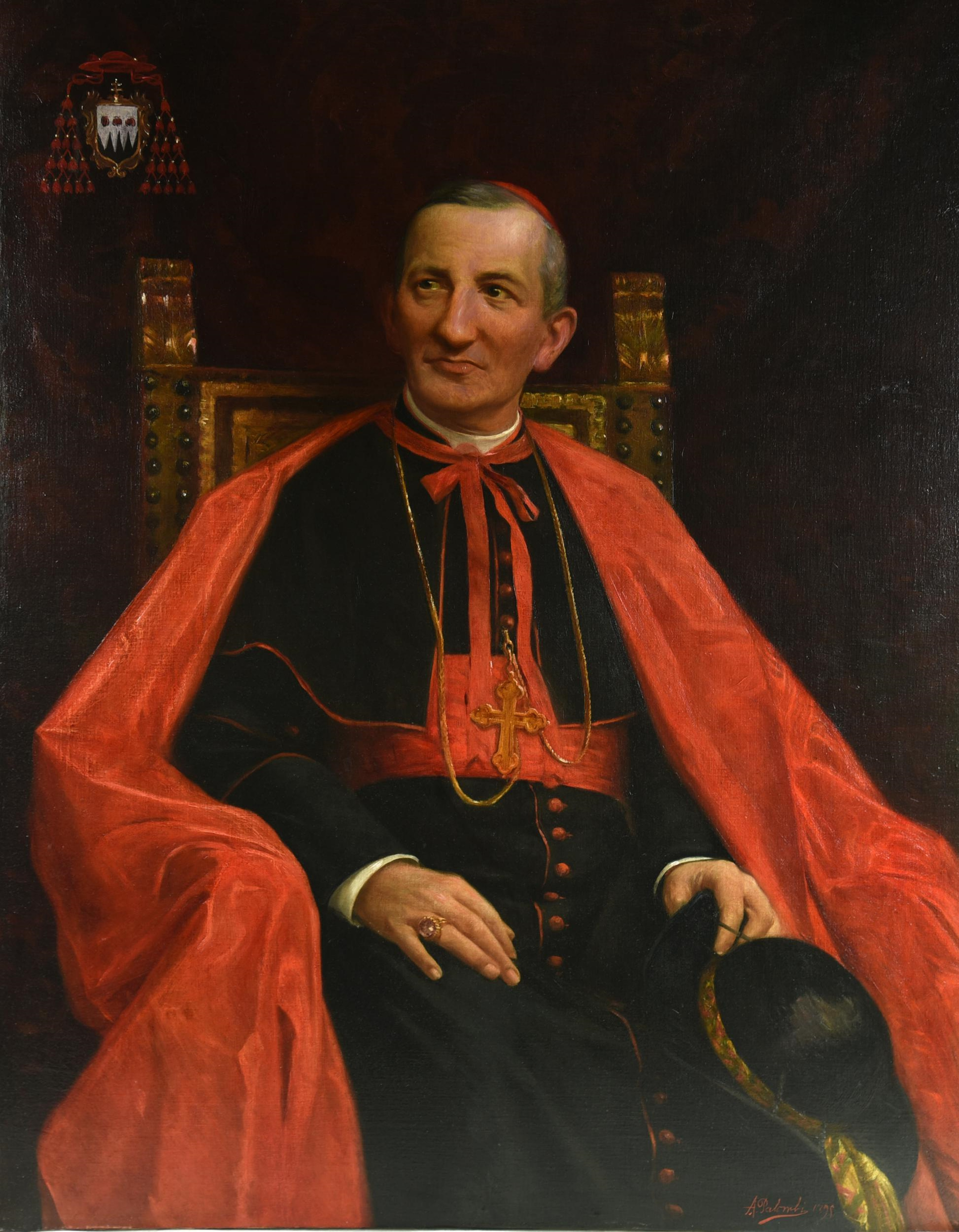
- Church: Roman Catholic Church
- Appointed: 20 March 1889
- Term ended: 29 May 1895
- Predecessor: Lorenzo Nina
- Successor: Rafael Merry del Val y Zulueta
- Other posts: Cardinal-Priest of Santa Maria in Traspontina (1891-95); Camerlengo of the College of Cardinals (1894-95)
- Previous posts: Archbishop of Chieti (1877-87); Apostolic Administrator of Vasto (1877-87); Titular Archbishop of Petra (1887-91); Apostolic Nuncio to Bavaria (1887-91)

Orders
- Ordination: 20 September 1862
- Consecration: 6 January 1878 by Flavio Chigi
- Created cardinal: 14 December 1891 by Pope Leo XIII
- Rank: Cardinal-Priest

Personal details
- Born: Fulco Luigi Ruffo-Scilla; 6 April 1840 Palermo, Kingdom of the Two Sicilies
- Died: 29 May 1895 (aged 55) Rome, Kingdom of Italy
- Buried: Campo Verano
- Parents: Fulco Antonio Ruffo; Eleonora Galletti

Styles of Fulco Luigi Ruffo-Scilla
- Reference style: His Eminence
- Spoken style: Your Eminence
- Informal style: Cardinal
- See: none

Fulco Luigi Ruffo-Scilla (6 April 1840 – 29 May 1895) was a Cardinal of the Catholic Church. He was elevated in 1891.

== Early life ==
Ruffo-Scilla was born in Palermo, Sicily. He was the son of Fulco Ruffo, 9th Prince of Scilla, and Eleonora Galletti.

His initial studies began with the Barnabites at the Colegio de Pontecorvo from 1850 to 1856. He was later educated at the Roman Seminary where he received a licentiate in theology on 3 September 1860. He was ordained a priest on 20 September 1892 in Rome. He continued his studies, receiving a licentiate in utroque iure (both civil and canon law) on 15 July 1864. He was appointed a Domestic prelate of His Holiness on 13 March 1868 by Pope Pius IX. He was advanced to the level of Protonotary apostolic ad instar participantium on 26 March 1873.

== Episcopate ==
He was appointed archbishop of Chieti-Vasto on 28 December 1877; on that same day he was granted the pallium. He was consecrated on 6 January 1878 at the patriarchal Lateran basilica, Rome, by Cardinal Flavio Chigi. He was named an Assistant at the Pontifical Throne, on 21 June 1881. He was transferred to the titular see of Petra and appointed nuncio to the Kingdom of Bavaria on 23 May 1887. He was later appointed Master of the Pontifical House and prefect of the Apostolic Palace on 20 March 1889.

== Cardinalate ==
He was created and proclaimed Cardinal-Priest of S. Maria in Traspontina in the consistory of 14 December 1891 by Pope Leo XIII. He was appointed Camerlengo of the Sacred College of Cardinals, succeeding Mariano Rampolla del Tindaro on 18 May 1894, holding the post until 18 March 1895. He died at the age of 55 on 29 May 1895.

Catholic Church titles
Preceded by Luigi Maria de Marinis	Archbishop of Chieti-Vasto; 28 December 1877 - 23 May 1887	Succeeded by Rocco Cocchia
Preceded by Mariano Rampolla del Tindaro	Camerlengo of the Sacred College of Cardinals; 18 May 1894 - 18 March 1895	Succeeded by Angelo di Pietro
