= Francisco-Javier Lozano Sebastián =

Spanish prelate of the Catholic Church (born 1943)

His Excellency, The Most Reverend Francisco-Javier Lozano Sebastián
- Apostolic Nuncio emeritus to Romania and Moldova; Titular Archbishop of Penafiel
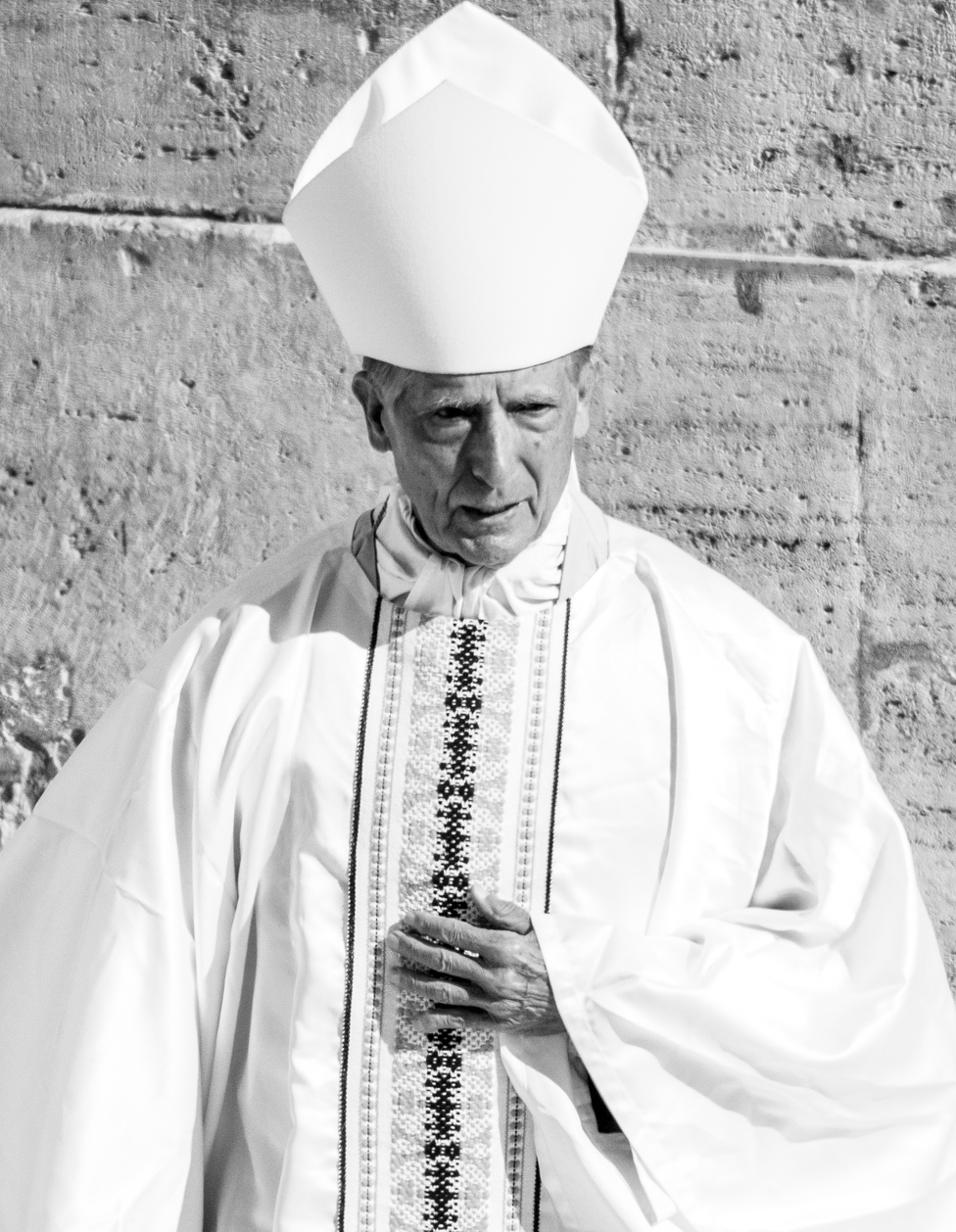
- Lozano Sebastián attends the funeral mass for Pope Francis in 2025.
- Appointed: 10 December 2007
- Retired: 20 July 2015
- Predecessor: Jean-Claude Périsset
- Successor: Miguel Maury Buendía
- Other post: Titular Archbishop of Penafiel
- Previous posts: Apostolic Nuncio to Croatia (2003-2007); Apostolic Nuncio to Democratic Republic of the Congo (1999-2001); Apostolic Nuncio to Tanzania (1994-1999)

Orders
- Ordination: 19 March 1968 by Antonio Samorè
- Consecration: 25 July 1994 by Angelo Sodano, Josip Uhac, and Carlos Amigo Vallejo

Personal details
- Born: 28 November 1943 (age 82) Villaverde de Íscar, Spain
- Motto: In Veritate Libertas

Styles of Francisco-Javier Lozano Sebastián
- Reference style: His Excellency; The Most Reverend
- Spoken style: Your Excellency
- Religious style: Archbishop

Francisco-Javier Lozano Sebastián (born 28 November 1943) is a Spanish prelate of the Catholic Church who has spent his career in the diplomatic service of the Holy See. He has been an archbishop since 1994 and held the title of Apostolic Nuncio to several countries until his resignation in 2015.

== Biography ==
He was born to a farming family in Villaverde de Íscar on 28 November 1943. He studied at the seminary in Seville and at the Pontifical University of Salamanca. He earned his licentiate in theology in 1966 from the Pontifical Gregorian University. He was ordained a priest on 19 March 1968, by Cardinal Antonio Samorè

== Diplomatic career ==
In 1977, he obtained a doctorate in canon law from Lateran University while already working in the Nunciature in Nigeria. His other early postings in the diplomatic service of the Holy See included South Africa, Zimbabwe, Yugoslavia, and Guatemala.

On 25 July 1994, Pope John Paul II appointed him titular archbishop of Penafiel and Apostolic Nuncio to Tanzania. He received his episcopal consecration from Cardinal Angelo Sodano on 25 July. John Paul made him Nuncio to the Democratic Republic of the Congo on 20 March 1999, during the Second Congo War, where in 2000 he criticized the shelling of Kisangani as a "tragic and unjustified" targeting of the Christian population.

He returned to Rome in 2001 and worked in the Section for General Affairs of the Secretariat of State and in December was also made a member of the administrative council of Vatican Television.

John Paul made him Nuncio to Croatia on 4 August 2003, and he received his next posting from Pope Benedict XVI as Nuncio to both Romania and Moldova on 10 December 2007.

Pope Francis accepted his resignation as Nuncio on 20 July 2015.

== Prize and awards ==
- 24 October 2020: the 9th edition of the John Paul II Prize in Bisceglie, Italy, together with Simona amabene, the Italian founder of the Marian family prayer Costola Rosa, the singers Golec uOrkiestra, Paolo Mengoli, Manuela Villa, Igor Minerva, Daniele Si Nasce, Devis Manoni, Silva Perentin, and the actors Daniela Poggi, Valentina Persia, Luca Capuano and Vincenzo Bocciarelli.

== See also ==
- Apostolic Nunciature
- Apostolic Nuncio
- Diplomacy of the Holy See
- List of heads of the diplomatic missions of the Holy See
