= Concordat of 1817 =

Two concordats were signed in 1817:

- Concordat of 24 October 1817, with Bavaria
- Concordat of 11 June 1817, with France.
