= Johann Casimir Häffelin =

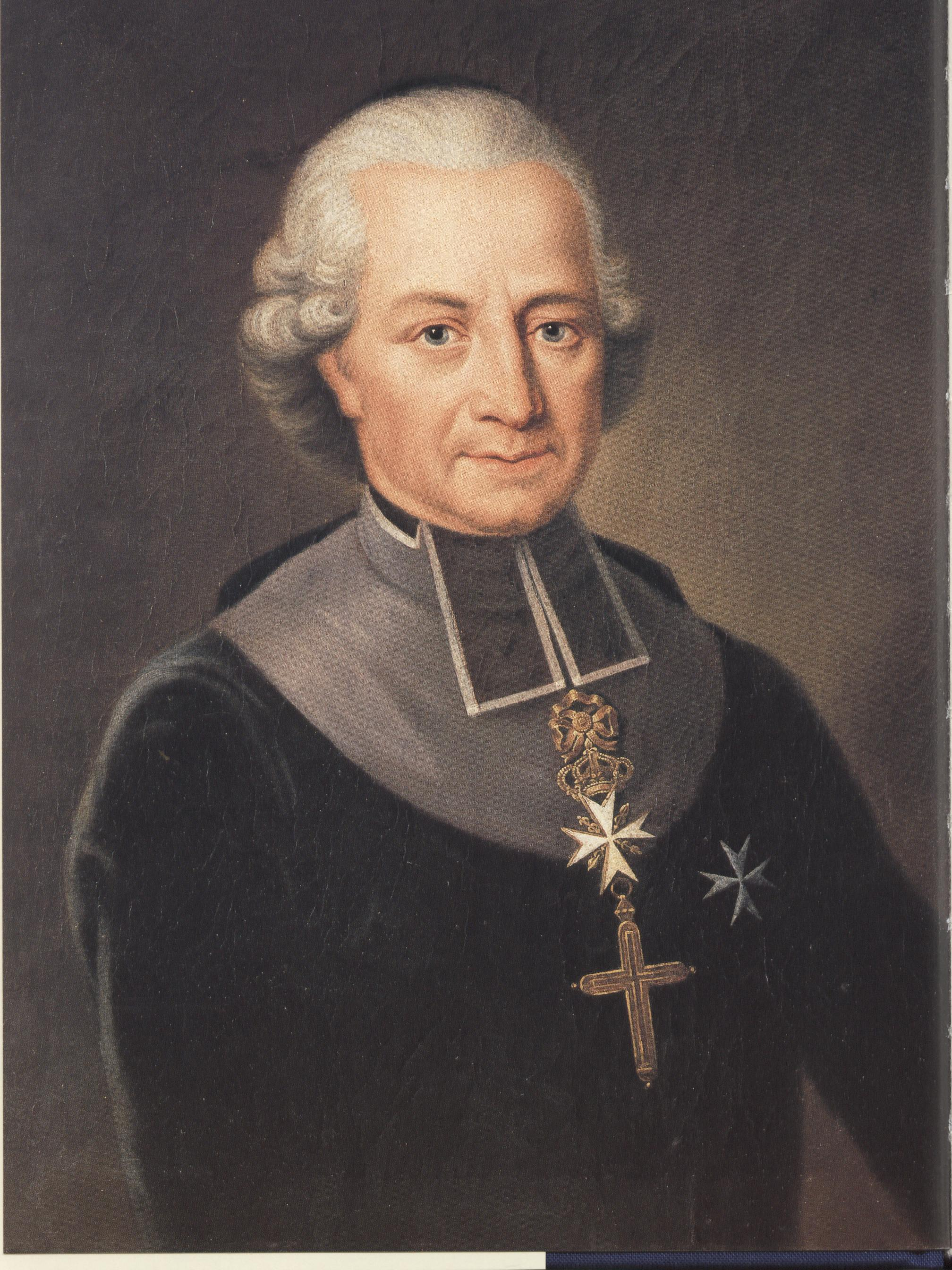
Johann Casimir Häffelin

Johann Casimir von Haeffelin (3 February 1737, Minfeld - 27 August 1827, Rome) was a Roman Catholic priest in the diocese of Speyer, a cardinal and a major diplomat during the reign of Maximilian I Joseph of Bavaria. As Bavaria's ambassador to the Holy See he negotiated the Concordat of 24 October 1817 between the Kingdom of Bavaria and the Catholic Church under pope Pius VII. He was made titular bishop of Chersonesus on Crete on 28 September 1817 by Pius VII and consecrated in the Maltheserkirche St. Michael in Munich on 11 November that year by the apostolic nuncio Giulio Cesare Zoglio. In the consistory of 6 April 1818 Pius VII also made him a cardinal, with his title being Santa Sabina and then from 1822 Sant'Anastasia - as such he took part in the conclave of 1823 which selected pope Leo XII.

== Sources ==
- Miranda, Salvador. "HÄFFELIN, Johann Casimir von (1737-1827)". The Cardinals of the Holy Roman Church. Florida International University. OCLC 53276621.
