= Apostolic Nunciature to Germany =

Diplomatic post of the Holy See

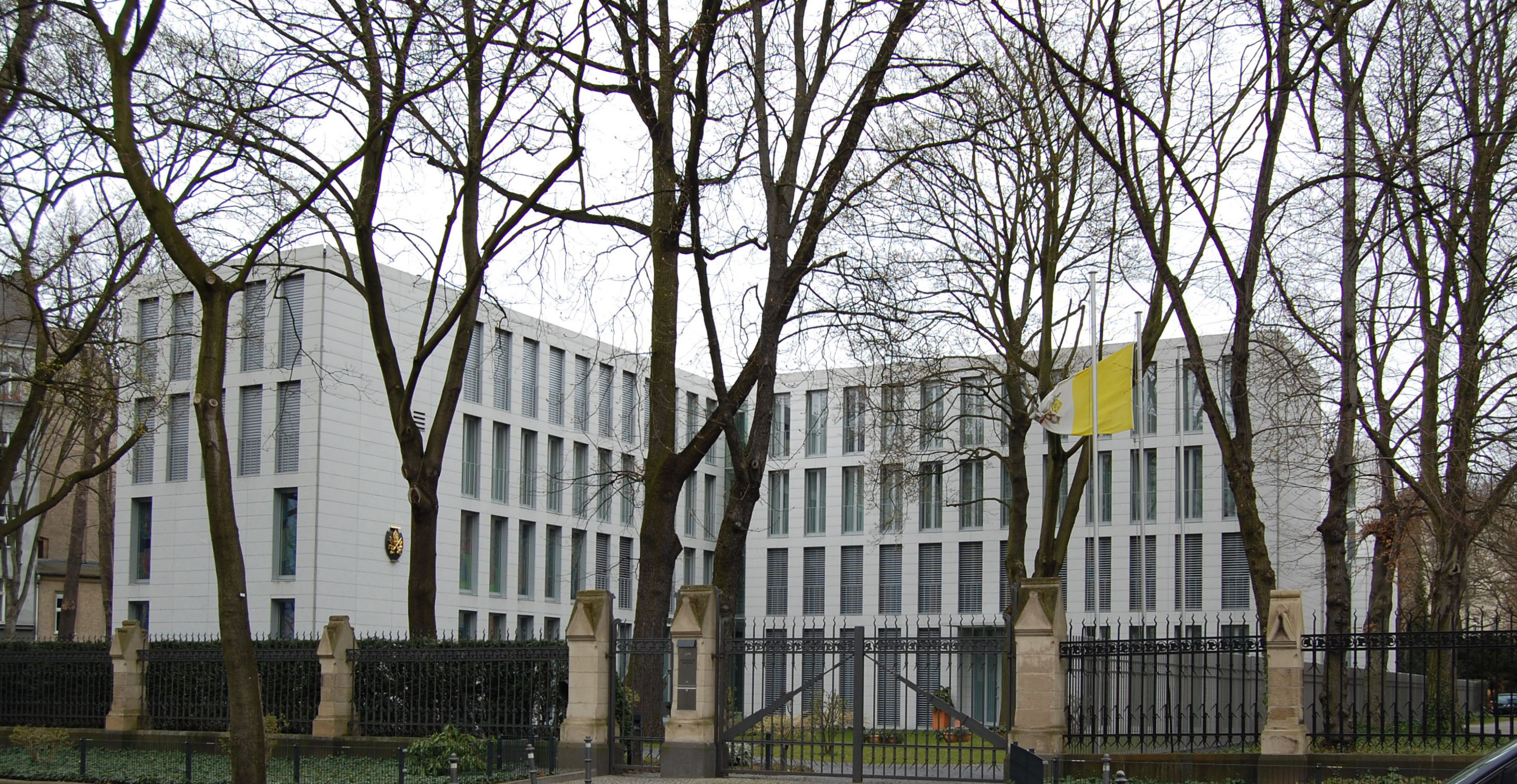
- Location: Berlin
- Apostolic Nuncio: Archbishop Hubertus van Megen

The Apostolic Nunciature to Germany is an ecclesiastical office of the Roman Catholic Church in Germany. It is a diplomatic post of the Holy See, whose representative is called the Apostolic Nuncio to Germany with the rank of an ambassador. The office of the nunciature has been located in Berlin since 1925, in union with the new Apostolic Nuncio to Prussia until 1934. Between 1920 and 1925 the nunciature was held in personal union by the Apostolic Nuncio to Bavaria, seated in Munich. With the unconditional surrender of Germany in 1945 the diplomatic ties were interrupted and reestablished for West Germany only in 1951, then in Bonn. In 2001 the nunciature moved again to Berlin.

Three Popes once served as nuncios in what is today's Germany: Alexander VII, Leo XII and Pius XII. As of 2026 the Apostolic Nuncio to Germany is Hubertus van Megen, appointed by Pope Leo XIV on April 9, 2026.

== List of Apostolic Nuncios to Germany ==
=== To the Holy Roman Empire ===
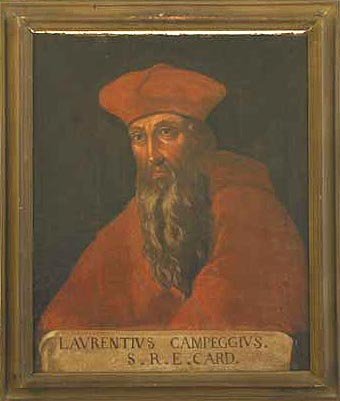
Lorenzo Campeggio, the first nuncio in the territory of modern-day Germany

The first nuncio in the territory of modern-day Germany was Lorenzo Campeggio in 1511, as the nuncio and cardinal protector to the Imperial Court. His role was ratified in 1513 by Leo X, the new pope. The nunciature became permanently accredited in 1530, whereafter the nuncios often followed Charles V, Holy Roman Emperor even when he left Imperial territory.

- Lorenzo Campeggio (1511–1539)
  - Karl von Miltitz, Nuncio to Saxony in 1518, envoy to prompt Luther's revocation of his theses, and Saxony to give up protecting Luther

=== In Cologne ===
The Cologne nunciature was erected in 1584 for the northwest of the Holy Roman Empire and the Rhineland. The Nuncios to Cologne were accredited to the Archbishop-Electorates of Cologne, Mainz and Trier. In 1596, the Low Countries (Netherlands) were detached from the nunciature of Cologne, receiving their own nuncio in Brussels.

- Giovanni Francesco Bonomi (= Bonhomini; 1584–1587), Bishop of Vercelli
- Ottavio Mirto Frangipani (1587–1596), Bishop of Cajazzo, 1592 Bishop of Tricarico
- Cesare Speciano (1592/96–1598)
- Coriolano Garzadoro (1593/98–1606), Bishop of Ossero
- Attilio Amalteo (1606–1610)
- Antonio Albergati (1610–1621)
- Pietro Francesco Montorio (1621-1624)
- Pier Luigi Carafa (1624–1634)
- Martino Alfieri (1634–1639)
- Fabio Chigi, future Pope Alexander VII (1639–1651)
- Agostino Franciotti (1666–1670)
- Francesco Buonvisi (1670–1672)
- Opizio Pallavicini (1672–1680)
- Sebastiano Tanara (1687–1690)
- Gianantonio Davia (1690–1696)
- Fabrizio Paolucci (1696–1700)
- Giulio Piazza (1702–1706)
- Giovanni Caprara Montecuccoli (1766–1775)
- Carlo Bellisomi (1775–1785)
- Bartolomeo Pacca (1786–1794)
- Annibale della Genga, last nuncio to Cologne and future Pope Leo XII (1794–1804)

Reunified with the Apostolic Nunciature to Austria or to the Emperor

=== In Berlin ===
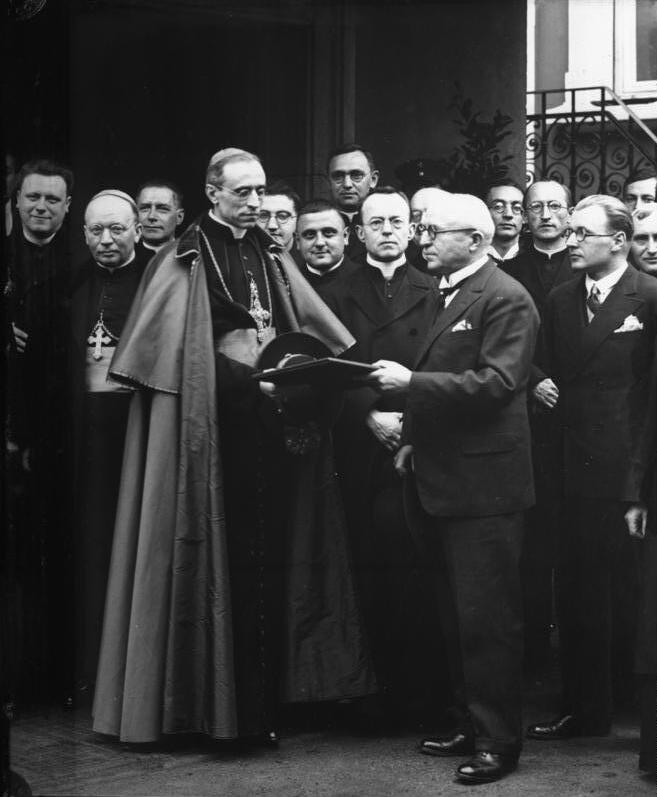
Pacelli, Nuncio to Germany, with Wilhelm von Opel and others in Rüsselsheim, Hesse, 1 October 1928.

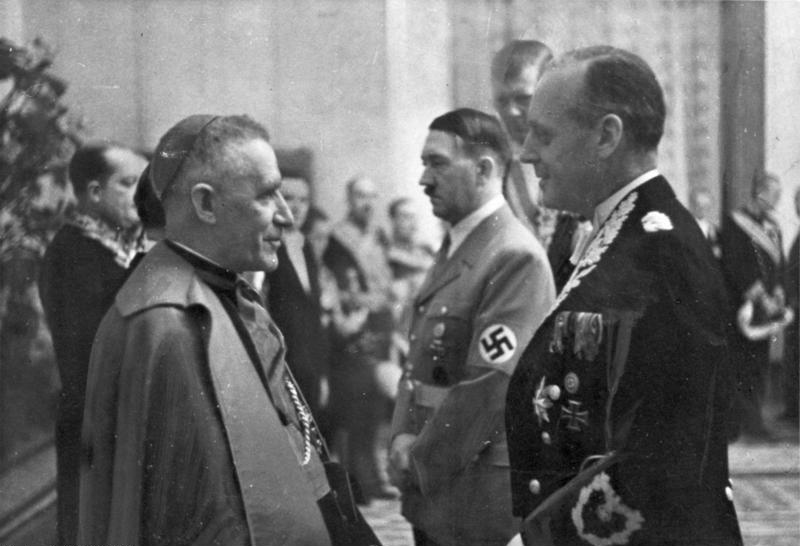
Cesare Orsenigo, nuncio to Germany during World War II, with Hitler and Joachim von Ribbentrop.

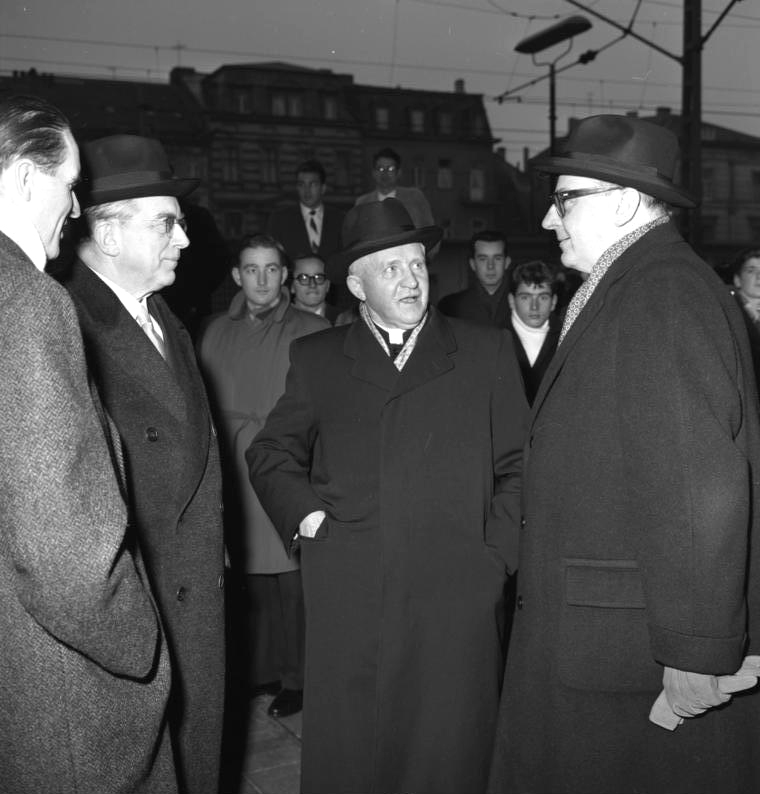
Aloisius Joseph Muench, nuncio to post-war West Germany.

Germany and the Holy See concluded diplomatic ties on 1 May 1920. Abp Eugenio Pacelli, Nuncio to Bavaria, was appointed in personal union "Nuncio to Germany". As with Bavaria, diplomatic relations were also established with the most important state of Germany, Prussia, in 1925, on which occasion Pacelli gave up the Bavarian nunciature and was appointed Nuncio to Prussia in personal union with the nunciature to Germany, and moved to Berlin the same year. Until the dissolution of the German federal states in May 1934, the respective Nuncio to Germany remained also Nuncio to Prussia by a separate title. The relations with Bavaria remained fully intact with Pacelli's successor Nuncio Abp Alberto Vassallo-Torregrossa, whose ambassadorial rank fell also away in 1934 together with the existence of Bavaria as an entity of statehood; he was however able to more or less continue affairs until he left the country in 1936 at the insistence of the Nazi regime.

- 1920–1930: Eugenio Pacelli (future Pope Pius XII), nuncio to Germany, in personal union nuncio to Bavaria (1917–1925) and nuncio to Prussia (1925–1930)
- 1930–1945: Cesare Orsenigo, in personal union nuncio to Prussia (1930–1934), since 1944 in Prötzel, and January 1945 in Eichstätt, where he died in 1946
- 1945–1951: vacancy, no nuncio to Allied-occupied Germany
  - 1946–1951: Aloisius Joseph Muench as apostolic visitor, in personal union military vicar delegate of the United States armed forces, becoming nuncio in Bonn in 1951.

=== In Bonn for the Federal Republic of Germany only ===
With West Germany, officially the Federal Republic of Germany, gaining quasi-sovereignty in 1951, the ties with the Holy See are upgraded again to nunciature level. The East German Democratic Republic had no diplomatic ties with the Vatican.

- Aloisius Joseph Muench (9 March 1951 – 5 December 1959)
- Corrado Bafile (13 February 1960 – 18 July 1975)
- Guido Del Mestri (12 August 1975 – 3 August 1984)
- Giuseppe Uhac (3 August 1984 – 21 June 1991)
  - as of 1990 also responsible for the New states of Germany
- Lajos Kada (22 August 1991 – 22 September 1995)
- Giovanni Lajolo (7 December 1995 – 7 October 2003)
  - until 2001 in Bonn

=== In Berlin since 2001 ===
- Giovanni Lajolo (7 December 1995 – 7 October 2003)
  - moved to Berlin in 2001, as did the Federal Government
- Erwin Josef Ender (25 November 2003 – 15 October 2007)
- Jean-Claude Périsset (15 October 2007 – 21 September 2013)
- Nikola Eterovic (21 September 2013 – 9 April 2026)
- Hubertus van Megen (9 April 2026 – present)

== See also ==
- Holy See – Germany relations
- Holy See in Germany
- Roman Catholicism in Germany
