= Nikola Eterović =

Croatian Roman Catholic archbishop

His Excellency, The Most Reverend Nikola Eterović
- Apostolic Nuncio Emeritus to Germany
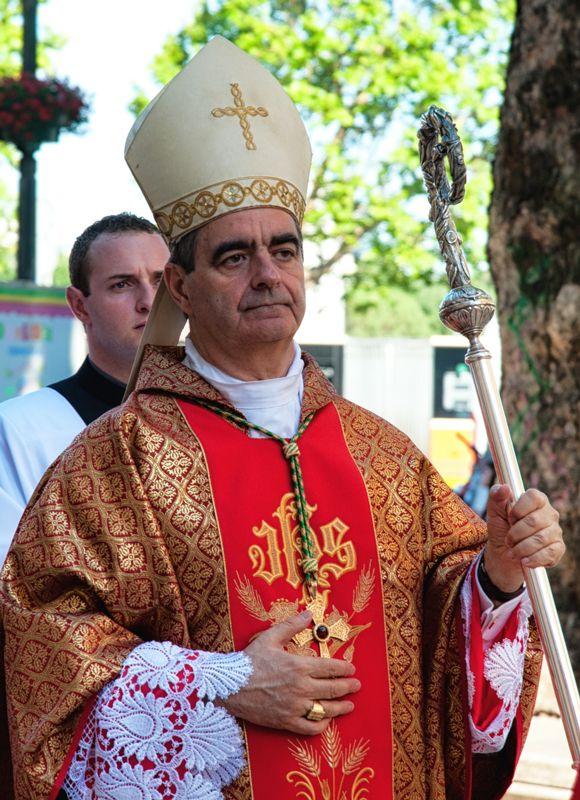
- Eterović in 2012
- Appointed: 21 September 2013
- Retired: 9 April 2026
- Predecessor: Jean-Claude Périsset
- Successor: Hubertus van Megen
- Other post: Titular Archbishop of Cibalae
- Previous posts: Apostolic Nuncio to Ukraine and Titular Archbishop of Sisak (1999-2009); Secretary General of the Synod of Bishops (2004-2013); Apostolic Nuncio to Germany (2013-2026)

Orders
- Ordination: 26 June 1977 by Celestin Bezmalinović
- Consecration: 10 July 1999 by Angelo Sodano

Personal details
- Born: Nikola Eterović; 20 January 1951 (age 75) Pučišća, PR Croatia, FPR Yugoslavia
- Motto: Caput anguli Christus (Latin for 'Christ is the cornerstone')

Styles of Nikola Eterović
- Reference style: His Excellency; The Most Reverend
- Spoken style: Your Excellency
- Religious style: Archbishop

Nikola Eterović (born 20 January 1951) is a Croatian prelate of the Catholic Church who is a titular archbishop and was the Apostolic Nuncio to Germany (2013–2026).

== Biography ==
Nikola Eterović was born on 20 January 1951 in Pučišća. He was ordained a priest of the Diocese of Hvar on 26 June 1977 by Bishop Celestin Bezmalinović.

== Diplomatic career ==
To prepare for a diplomatic career he entered the Pontifical Ecclesiastical Academy in 1977. On 25 March 1980 he joined the diplomatic service of the Holy See. He fulfilled early assignments in the Apostolic Nunciatures in the Côte d'Ivoire, Spain, and Nicaragua and in the offices of the Secretariat of State.

Pope John Paul II appointed him titular archbishop of Sisak and Apostolic Nuncio to Ukraine on 22 May 1999. He was consecrated a bishop on 10 July 1999 by Cardinal Secretary of State Angelo Sodano, assisted by Ante Jurić, Archbishop of Split, and Slobodan Štambuk, Bishop of Hvar.

On 11 February 2004, he was named general secretary of the Synod of Bishops.

Eterović was named a member of the Congregation for the Evangelization of Peoples on 9 May 2009 and of the Pontifical Council for Promoting the New Evangelization on 20 December 2010.

On 27 November 2009, anticipating the creation of the Diocese of Sisak on 5 December, Eterović was made titular archbishop of Cibalae by Pope Benedict XVI.

On 21 September 2013, Pope Francis appointed him Apostolic Nuncio to Germany. He presented his credentials to Federal President Joachim Gauck on 20 November 2013.

On 9 April 2026, Pope Leo XIV accepted his resignation as apostolic nuncio to Germany. German Catholic Radio remarked that he had been unsuccessful as a mediator between the Holy See and the German Church's Synodal Way because of "cultural and linguistic barriers".

== See also ==
- List of heads of the diplomatic missions of the Holy See

Diplomatic posts
Preceded by Antonio Franco	Apostolic Nuncio to Ukraine; 22 May 1999–11 February 2004	Succeeded by Ivan Jurkovič
Preceded by Jean-Claude Périsset	Apostolic Nuncio to Germany; 21 September 2013–9 April 2026	Succeeded by Hubertus van Megen
Catholic Church titles
Preceded by Jan Pieter Schotte	Secretary General of the Synod of Bishops; 11 February 2004–21 September 2013	Succeeded by Lorenzo Baldisseri
