= Apostolic Nunciature to Moldova =

Diplomatic Mission of the Holy See in Moldova

- Location: Chișinău, Moldova.
- Address: Cathedral of Chisinau, Strada Mitropolit Dosoftei 85, Chișinău, Moldova.
- Coordinates: 47°01′44.2″N 28°49′45.9″E
- Apostolic Nuncio: vacant

The Apostolic Nunciature to Moldova the diplomatic mission of the Holy See to Moldova. It is located in the Cathedral of Chisinau, in Chisinau. The Apostolic Nunciature to the Republic of Moldova is an ecclesiastical office of the Catholic Church in Moldova, with the rank of an embassy. The nuncio serves both as the ambassador of the Holy See to the President of Moldova, and as delegate and point-of-contact between the Catholic hierarchy in Moldova and the Pope.

The title Apostolic Nuncio to Moldova is held by the prelate appointed Apostolic Nuncio to Romania; he resides in Romania.

== Papal representatives to Moldova ==
- Angelo Acerbi (13 January 1994 – 8 February 1997)
- Karl-Joseph Rauber (25 April 1997 – 22 February 2003)
- Jean-Claude Périsset (22 March 2003 – 15 October 2007)
- Francisco-Javier Lozano Sebastián (10 December 2007 – 20 July 2015)
- Miguel Maury Buendía (25 January 2016 – 13 April 2023)
- Giampiero Gloder (23 February 2024 – present)
