= Giampiero Gloder =

Italian prelate of the Catholic Church (born 1958)

His Excellency, The Most Reverend Giampiero Gloder
- Apostolic Nuncio to Romania and Moldova; Titular Archbishop of Telde
- Church: Catholic Church
- Appointed: 23 February 2024
- Predecessor: Miguel Maury Buendía
- Other post: Titular Archbishop of Telde
- Previous posts: Apostolic Nuncio to Cuba (2019-2024); Vice-Camerlengo of the Apostolic Camera (2014-2019); President of the Pontifical Ecclesiastical Academy (2013-2019); Head of Office for Special Affairs of the Secretariat of State (2005-2013)

Orders
- Ordination: 4 June 1983 by Filippo Franceschi
- Consecration: 24 October 2013 by Pope Francis

Personal details
- Born: Giampiero Gloder; 15 May 1958 (age 68) Asiago, Italy
- Education: Pontifical University of Saint Thomas Aquinas; Pontifical Gregorian University; Pontifical Ecclesiastical Academy
- Motto: Sufficit tibi gratia mea (My grace is sufficient for you)
- Coat of arms

Styles of Giampiero Gloder
- Reference style: His Excellency; The Most Reverend
- Spoken style: Your Excellency
- Religious style: Archbishop

Giampiero Gloder (born 15 May 1958) is an Italian prelate of the Catholic Church who has worked in the diplomatic service of the Holy See in 1993. He was named Apostolic Nuncio to Cuba in October 2019 after serving as president of the Pontifical Ecclesiastical Academy since 2013 and Vice Camerlengo of the Holy Roman Church from 2014 to 2019.

== Biography ==
Gloder was born in the township of Asiago in the Italian Province of Vicenza. He was ordained a priest for the diocese of Padua on 4 June 1983. He studied dogmatic theology and then studied at the Pontifical Ecclesiastical Academy.

== Diplomatic career ==
He entered the diplomatic service of the Holy See on 1 July 1993. He worked in Guatemala until 1995 and then in the General Affairs Office of the Secretariat of State in Rome. He was promoted to First Secretary in 1997, Counselor 2nd class in 2001, and Counselor First Class in 2005.

On 21 September 2013, Pope Francis gave him the title Apostolic Nuncio and named him President of the Pontifical Ecclesiastical Academy, succeeding Archbishop Beniamino Stella who was appointed prefect of the Congregation for the Clergy. He was also named Titular Archbishop of Telde. He was consecrated a bishop by Pope Francis on 24 October 2013.

On 13 September 2014 he was appointed a member of the Congregation for the Evangelization of Peoples. On 20 December 2014 Pope Francis named him vice Camerlengo of the Holy Roman Church.

== Diplomatic career ==
Pope Francis appointed him Apostolic Nuncio to Cuba on 11 October 2019.

On 23 February 2024, Pope Francis appointed him Apostolic Nuncio to Romania and Moldova.

== See also ==
- List of heads of the diplomatic missions of the Holy See

Educational offices
| Preceded by Beniamino Stella | President of the Pontifical Ecclesiastical Academy; 21 September 2013–11 October 2019 | Succeeded by Joseph Marino |
Catholic Church titles
| Preceded by Pier Luigi Celata | Vice Camerlengo of the Holy Roman Church; 2014–2020 | Succeeded by Ilson de Jesus Montanari |
Diplomatic posts
| Preceded by Giorgio Lingua | Apostolic Nuncio to Cuba; 11 October 2019 – 23 February 2024 | Succeeded by Antoine Camilleri |
| Preceded by Miguel Maury Buendía | Apostolic Nuncio to Romania and Moldova; 23 February 2024 – | Incumbent |
