= Apostolic Nunciature to Romania =

Diplomatic Mission of the Holy See in Romania

- Location: Bucharest, Romania.
- Address: Strada Constantin D. Stahi 5-7, București 010187, Romania
- Coordinates: 44°26′20.5″N 26°05′09.6″E
- Apostolic Nuncio: Giampiero Gloder

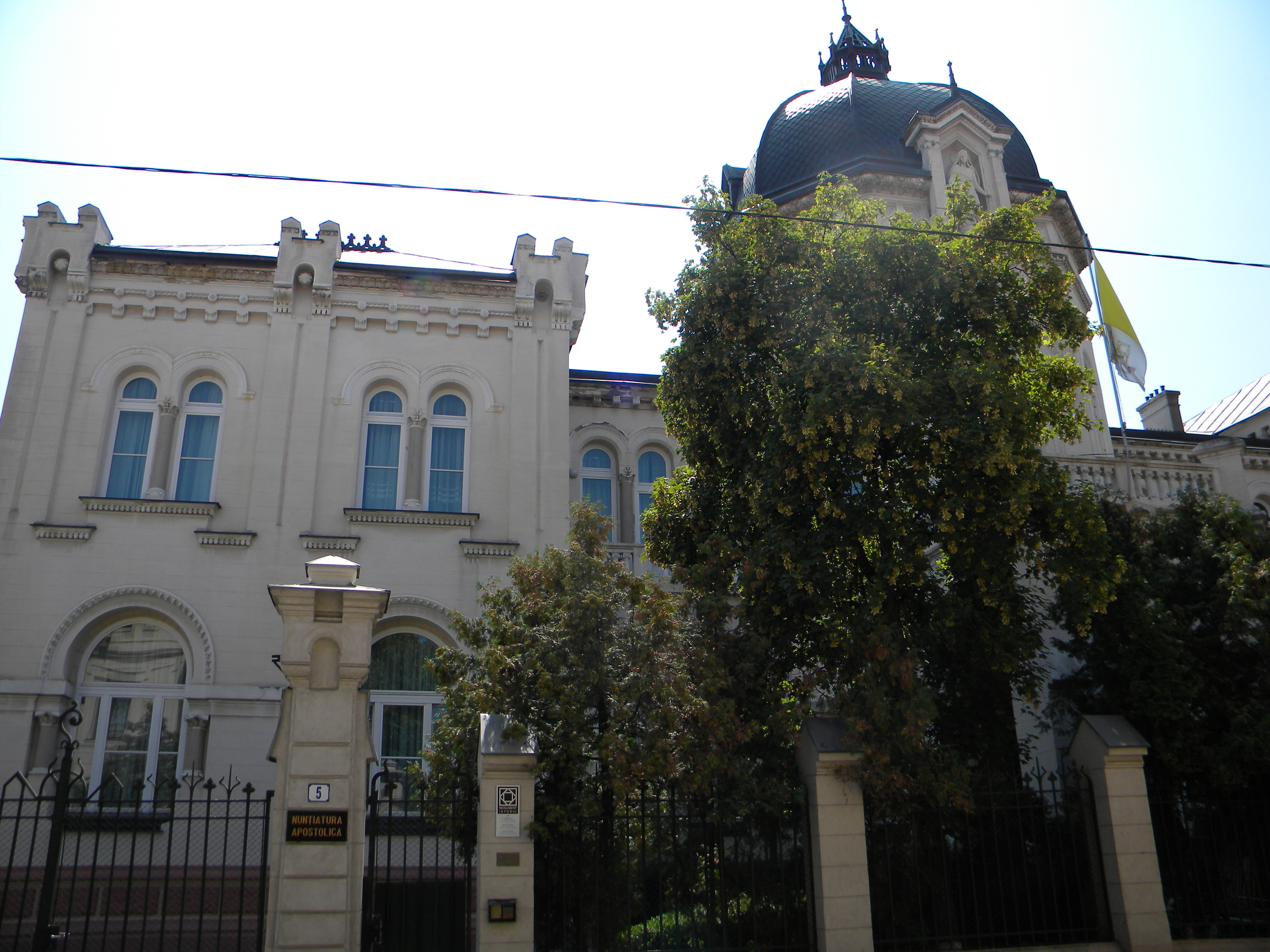
Palace of the Apostolic Nunciature of the Holy See in Bucharest

The Apostolic Nunciature to Romania the diplomatic mission of the Holy See to Romania. It is located in Bucharest.

The Apostolic Nunciature to Romania is an ecclesiastical office of the Catholic Church in Romania, with the rank of an embassy. The nuncio serves both as the ambassador of the Holy See to the President of Romania, and as delegate and point-of-contact between the Catholic hierarchy in Romania and the Pope.

The Apostolic Nuncio to Romania is usually also the Apostolic Nuncio to Moldova upon his appointment to said nation.

== Papal representatives to Romania ==
- Francesco Marmaggi (1 September 1920 – 30 May 1923)
- Angelo Maria Dolci (30 May 1923 – 13 March 1933)
- Valerio Valeri (3 April 1933 – 3 June 1936)
- Andrea Cassulo (14 Jun 1936 – 3 June 1947)

Apostolic Regents

- Gerald O'Hara (1946 – 1950)

Apostolic Nuncios

- John Bukovsky, S.V.D. (18 August 1990 – 20 December 1994)
- Janusz Bolonek (23 January 1995 – 30 September 1998)
- Jean-Claude Périsset (12 November 1998 – 15 October 2007)
- Francisco-Javier Lozano Sebastián (10 December 2007 – 20 July 2015)
- Miguel Maury Buendía (5 December 2015 – 13 April 2023)
- Giampiero Gloder (23 February 2024 – present)
