= Jean-Claude Périsset =

Swiss titular archbishop and diplomat

His Excellency, The Most Reverend Jean-Claude Périsset
- Apostolic Nuncio emeritus of Germany; Titular Archbishop of Justiniana Prima
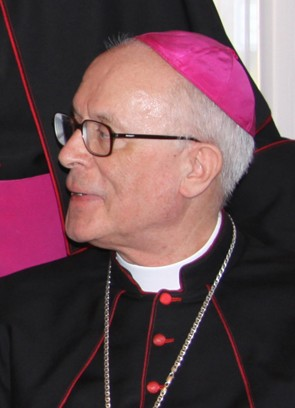
- Appointed: 15 October 2007
- Retired: 21 September 2013
- Predecessor: Erwin Josef Ender
- Successor: Nikola Eterovic
- Other post: Titular Archbishop of Justiniana Prima
- Previous posts: Apostolic Nuncio to Moldova (2003-2007); Apostolic Nuncio to Romania (1998-2007); Titular Bishop of Accia (1996-1998)

Orders
- Ordination: 28 June 1964
- Consecration: 6 January 1997 by Pope John Paul II, Giovanni Battista Re and Myroslav Marusyn

Personal details
- Born: Jean-Claude Périsset; 13 April 1939 (age 87) Estavayer-le-Lac, Switzerland
- Denomination: Roman Catholic

Styles of Jean-Claude Périsset
- Reference style: His Excellency; The Most Reverend
- Spoken style: Your Excellency
- Religious style: Archbishop

Jean-Claude Périsset (born 13 April 1939) is a Swiss titular archbishop of the Roman Catholic Church and diplomat of the Holy See. He served as Apostolic Nuncio to Germany from 2007 until his resignation in 2013.

== Biography ==
Périsset was born on 13 April 1939 in Estavayer-le-Lac, Switzerland. He was ordained as a priest on 28 June 1964.

== Diplomatic career ==
To prepare for a diplomatic career he entered the Pontifical Ecclesiastical Academy in 1967.

On 16 November 1996, he was appointed Titular Bishop of Accia and was named the secretary of the Pontifical Council for Promoting Christian Unity.

On 12 November 1998, Périsset was named the Titular Archbishop of Justiniana Prima and was appointed Apostolic Nuncio to Romania.

On 22 March 2003, he was named the Nuncio to Moldova as well. On 15 October 2007, he was appointed the Nuncio to Germany, where he served until his resignation due to old age on 21 September 2013. He was succeeded by Nikola Eterović.

== See also ==
- List of heads of the diplomatic missions of the Holy See

Diplomatic posts
Preceded by Janusz Bolonek	Apostolic Nuncio to Romania; 12 November 1998-15 October 2007	Succeeded by Francisco-Javier Lozano Sebastián
Preceded by Karl Josef Rauber	Apostolic Nuncio to Moldova; 22 March 2003-15 October 2007	Succeeded by Francisco-Javier Lozano Sebastián
Preceded by Erwin Josef Ender	Apostolic Nuncio to Germany; 15 October 2007-21 September 2013	Succeeded by Nikola Eterović
