= Angelo Di Pietro =

His Eminence Angelo di Pietro
- Datary of the Apostolic Dataria
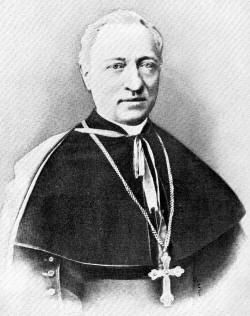
- Church: Roman Catholic Church
- Appointed: 29 June 1908
- Term ended: 5 December 1914
- Predecessor: Fabrizio Dionigi Ruffo
- Successor: Vincenzo Vannutelli
- Other post: Cardinal-Priest of San Lorenzo in Lucina (1903–14)
- Previous posts: Titular Bishop of Nyssa (1866–77); Auxiliary Bishop of Velletri (1866–77); Apostolic Delegate to Argentina (1877–79); Titular Archbishop of Nazianzus (1877–93); Apostolic Internuncio to Brazil (1879–82); Apostolic Nuncio to Bavaria (1882–87); Prefect of the Congregation of the Council (1893–1902); Cardinal-Priest of Santi Bonifacio ed Alessio (1893–1903); Camerlengo of the College of Cardinals (1895–96); Prefect of the Congregation of Bishops and Regulars (1902); Pro-Datary of the Apostolic Dataria (1902–08)

Orders
- Ordination: 20 December 1851 by Carlo Gigli
- Consecration: 1 July 1866 by Gustav Adolf von Hohenlohe-Schillingsfürst
- Created cardinal: 16 January 1893 by Pope Leo XIII
- Rank: Cardinal-Priest

Personal details
- Born: Angelo di Pietro; 22 May 1828 Vivaro Romano, Tivoli, Papal States
- Died: 5 December 1914 (aged 86) Rome, Kingdom of Italy
- Buried: Campo Verano
- Education: La Sapienza University

Styles of Angelo Di Pietro
- Reference style: His Eminence
- Spoken style: Your Eminence
- Informal style: Cardinal
- See: Nisa in Lycia (titular see)

Angelo Di Pietro (22 May 1828 – 5 December 1914) was a cardinal of the Catholic Church and prefect of the Congregation of the Council.

== Biography ==
Angelo Di Pietro was born in Vivaro Romano, Tivoli. He was educated at the Seminary of Tivoli, and La Sapienza University in Rome where he earned a doctorate utroque iuris in 1858.

He was ordained on 20 December 1851 in Tivoli. He served as secretary and pro-vicar general of the Bishop of Tivoli; vicar general of the diocese of Ostia and Velletri. He was appointed as titular bishop of Nisa in Lycia and auxiliary bishop of Velletri on 25 June 1866. He was promoted to the titular see of Nazianzo on 28 December 1877. He was appointed as Apostolic delegate and extraordinary legate in Paraguay and Uruguay on 18 January 1878. He served as Nuncio to the Brazilian Empire from 1879 until he was posted as Nuncio to Bavaria on 21 March 1882, where he served until 1887, when he became Nuncio to Spain.

He was created Cardinal-Priest of Santi Bonifacio ed Alessio in the consistory of 16 January 1893 by Pope Leo XIII.

Pope Leo appointed him Prefect of the Congregation of the Council on 20 June 1893. He opted for the title of San Lorenzo in Lucina on 22 June 1903. He participated in the conclave of 1903 that elected Pope Pius X and the conclave of 1914 that elected Pope Benedict XV. He died in 1914.

Catholic Church titles
Preceded by Luigi Serafini	Prefect of the Congregation of the Council; 20 June 1893 – 18 March 1895	Succeeded by Vincenzo Vannutelli
Records
Preceded by Alfonso Capecelatro	Eldest Member of the Sacred College; 14 November 1912 – 5 December 1914	Succeeded by François de Rovérié de Cabrières
