= Minfeld =

- Municipality
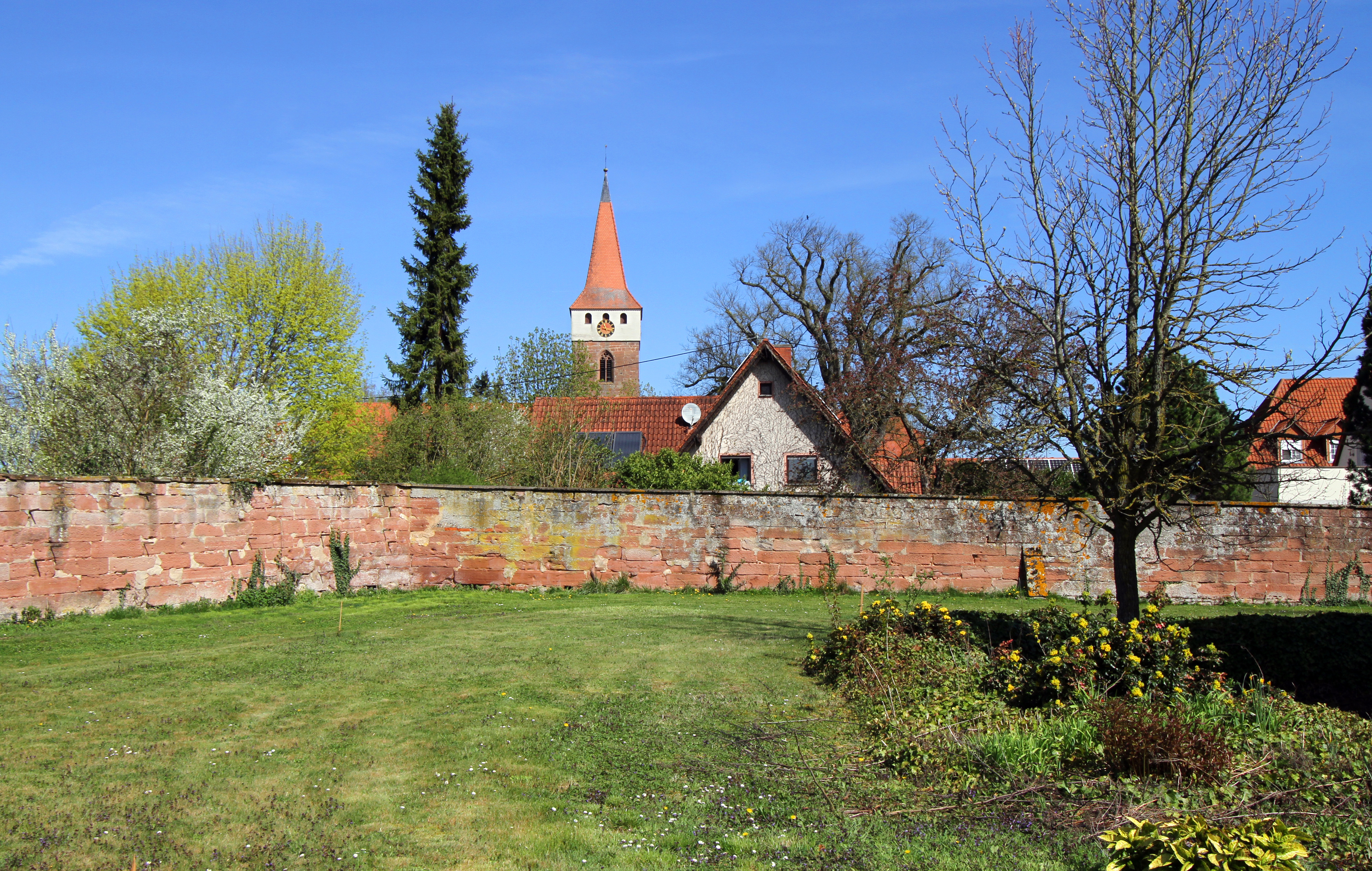

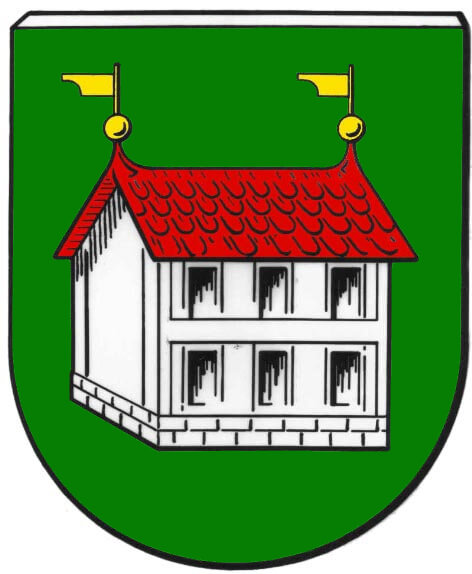
- Coat of arms

- Location of Minfeld within Germersheim district
- Interactive map of Minfeld
- Location within Germany Location within Rhineland-Palatinate
- Coordinates: 49°04′18″N 08°08′43″E
- Country: Germany
- State: Rhineland-Palatinate
- District: Germersheim
- Municipal assoc.: Kandel

Government
  - Mayor (2019–24): Martin Volz

Area
  - Total: 8.41 km^{2} (3.25 sq mi)
- Elevation: 125 m (410 ft)

Population (2025-12-31)
  - Total: 1,752
  - Density: 208/km^{2} (540/sq mi)
- Time zone: UTC+01:00 (CET)
  - Summer (DST): UTC+02:00 (CEST)
- Postal codes: 76872
- Dialling codes: 07275
- Vehicle registration: GER
- Website: www.minfeld.de

Minfeld is a municipality in the district of Germersheim, in Rhineland-Palatinate, Germany.

== Sons and daughters of the community ==
- Johann Casimir Häffelin (1737-1827), bishop, cardinal, Bavarian Minister of the Holy See, diplomat

== Personalities who have worked on the ground ==
- Karl Friedrich Scholler (1810-1863), theologian, writer and politician, from 1858 vice dean in Minfeld, died there
- Clemens Nagel (born 1945), politician (SPD), from 1984 to 2004 local mayor, member of the Landtag of Rhineland-Palatinate 1975-2001
- Pascal Ackermann (born 1994), cyclist
