= Giovanni Francesco Bonomi =

Roman Catholic prelate

Most Reverend Giovanni Francesco Bonomi
- Church: Catholic Church
- Diocese: Vercelli
- In office: 1572–1587

Orders
- Consecration: 25 January 1573 (Bishop) by Charles Borromeo

Personal details
- Born: 16 December 1536 Cremona
- Died: 26 February 1587 (aged 50) Liège

Giovanni Francesco Bonomi (or Bonomigni, Latin: Johannes Franciscus Bonhomini; 1536 – 1587) was a Roman Catholic prelate who served as Bishop of Vercelli, and Apostolic Nuncio to Switzerland, Apostolic Nuncio to Emperor and Apostolic Nuncio to Cologne. He was an exponent of the Catholic Reformation.

== Life ==
Bonomi was born on 16 December 1536 to a Cremonese patrician family, studied law at the Universities of Bologna and Pavia and received his degree in utroque iure. In 1560 he became auditor, in 1565 clerk and finally prefect of the Signatura, a predecessor authority of the Apostolic Signatura established in 1608; In 1566 he was also abbot of Nonantola.

On 17 October 1572, Pope Gregory XIII appointed him to the Bishop of Vercelli. He received the episcopal consecration on 25 January 1573 in Milan by the hands of his friend, later canonized, Cardinal Charles Borromeo, Archbishop of Milan.

Bonomi was in touch with the Catholic Major of Stans in Switzerland, Melchior Lussy. Bonomi traveled with Charles Borromeo in 1567 to Ticino and in 1570 to the rest of Switzerland; this visitation is considered to be the beginning of the Catholic Reformation in the Swiss Confederation.

In 1578, at the request of Charles Borromeo, by Pope Gregory XIII Bonomi was sent as a visitor to the Diocese of Como, and he also visited Valtellina and Ticino. From 27 May 1579 to 16 September 1581 he worked as Apostolic Nuncio with special rights in Switzerland, where he visited parishes and monasteries in the dioceses of Constance, Basel, Chur, Lausanne and Sion and founded the Jesuit College of Saint Michael in Freiburg by Peter Canisius. Bonomi was a staunch advocate of the Decrees of the Council of Trent (1545 – 1563) and a patron of the Jesuits. His work in Switzerland met with resistance from parts of the clergy and from individual monasteries and from secular authorities, and even the curia repeatedly admonished him to be more lenient.

From 16 September 1581 to 20 October 1584 Bonomi was nuncio at the imperial court in Vienna, in 1582 and 1583 he was papal special envoy to the Diet of Augsburg and at the election of Ernest of Bavaria to the Archbishop of Cologne, and finally from 20 October 1584 to his death he was the first permanent nuncio in Cologne. However, Bonomi had not a fixed place of residence. During this phase he pushed for the reforming decisions of the Council of Trent in the Rhineland and the Spanish Netherlands, holding himself synods in Liège and Mons.

After his death in Liège on 26 February 1587, his body was transferred to Vercelli and buried in the Cathedral of Sant'Eusebio. The permanent establishment of the nunciature in Cologne was to be reserved for his successor, Ottavio Mirto Frangipani.
