= Villaverde de Íscar =

- Municipality
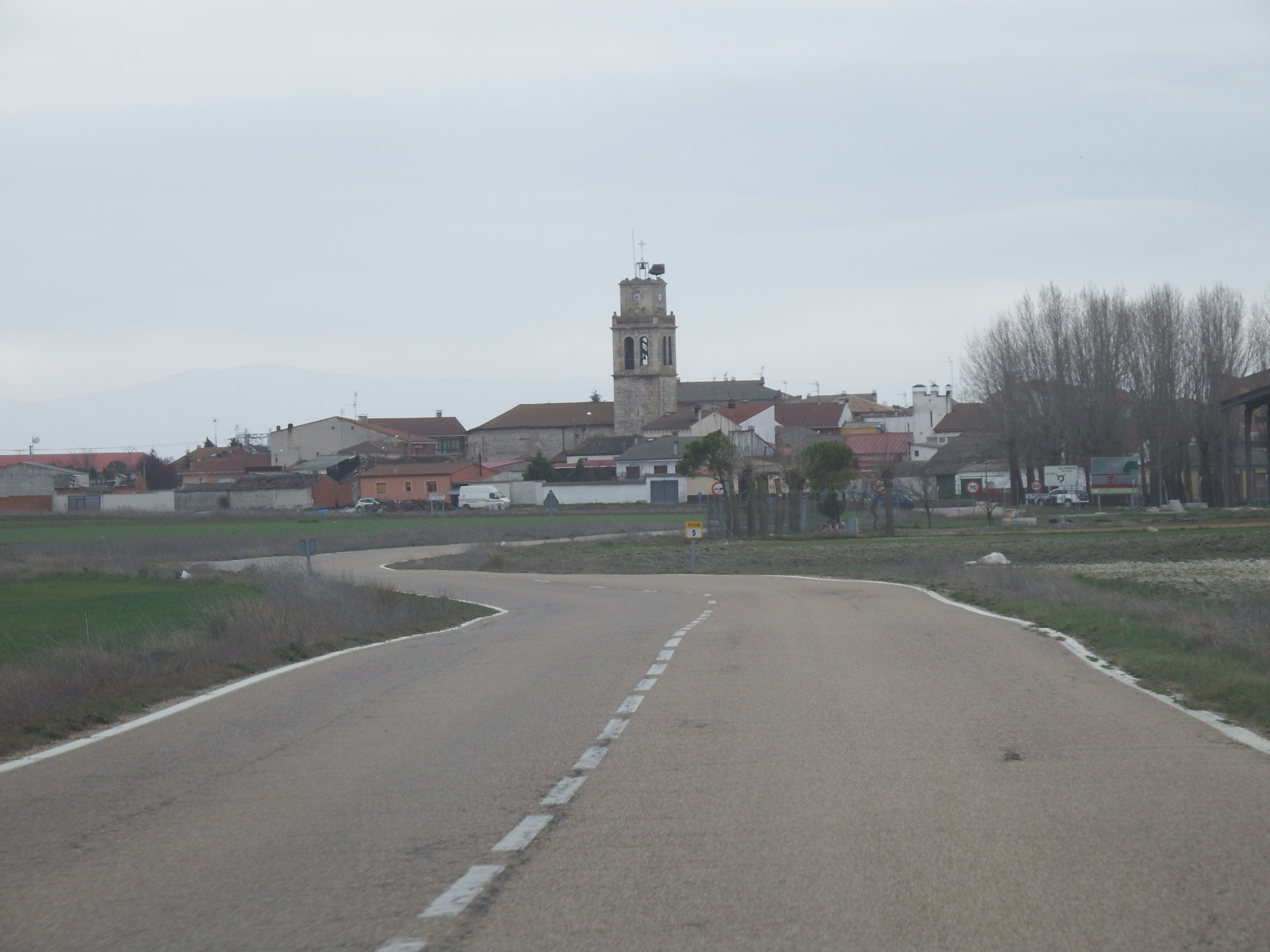

- Flag Coat of arms

- Location in Spain. Villaverde de Íscar (Spain)
- Coordinates: 41.3067°N 4.5278°W
- Country: Spain
- Autonomous community: Castile and León
- Province: Segovia
- Municipality: Villaverde de Íscar

Area
  - Total: 27 km^{2} (10 sq mi)

Population (2025-01-01)
  - Total: 579
  - Density: 21/km^{2} (56/sq mi)
- Time zone: UTC+1 (CET)
  - Summer (DST): UTC+2 (CEST)
- Website: Official website

Villaverde de Íscar is a municipality located in the province of Segovia, Castile and León, Spain. According to the 2004 census (INE), the municipality has a population of 687 inhabitants.
