= Doub's Mill Historic District =

Historic district in Maryland, United States

- U.S. National Register of Historic Places
- U.S. Historic district
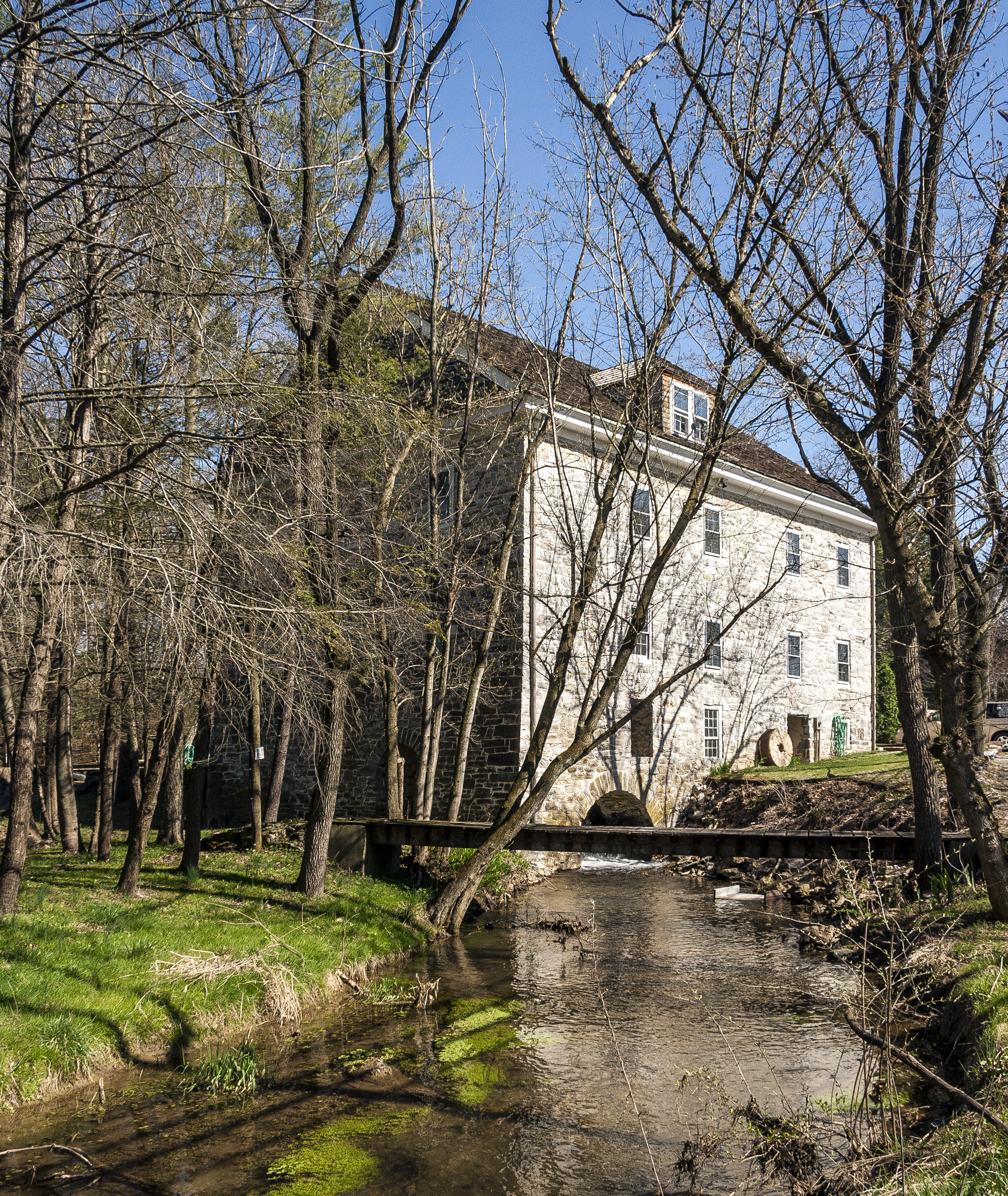
- Doub's Mill

- Location within Maryland Location within the United States
- Location: Southwest of Beaver Creek on Beaver Creek Rd., Beaver Creek, Maryland
- Coordinates: 39°34′43″N 77°39′18″W
- Area: 15 acres (6.1 ha)
- NRHP reference No.: 79003270
- Added to NRHP: October 1, 1979

The Doub's Mill Historic District is a national historic district that encompasses a portion of the small community of Beaver Creek, Maryland, dating to the late 18th century and early 19th century. The dominating structure is Doub's Mill, a grain mill built between 1811 and 1821 by John Funk. Using local limestone, the neighborhood displays an unusual consistency of style and construction. In addition to Doub's Mill, there are five other homes and numerous outbuildings, all originally part of the mill complex. The stone structures are built in the German tradition, and one has a date stone inscribed 1782, at which time the area belonged to Henry and Christian Newcomer, Mennonites of Swiss-German origin.

Doub's Mill Historic District was listed on the National Register of Historic Places in 1979.
