= Beaver Creek, Maryland =

Unincorporated community in Maryland, United States

- Census-designated place
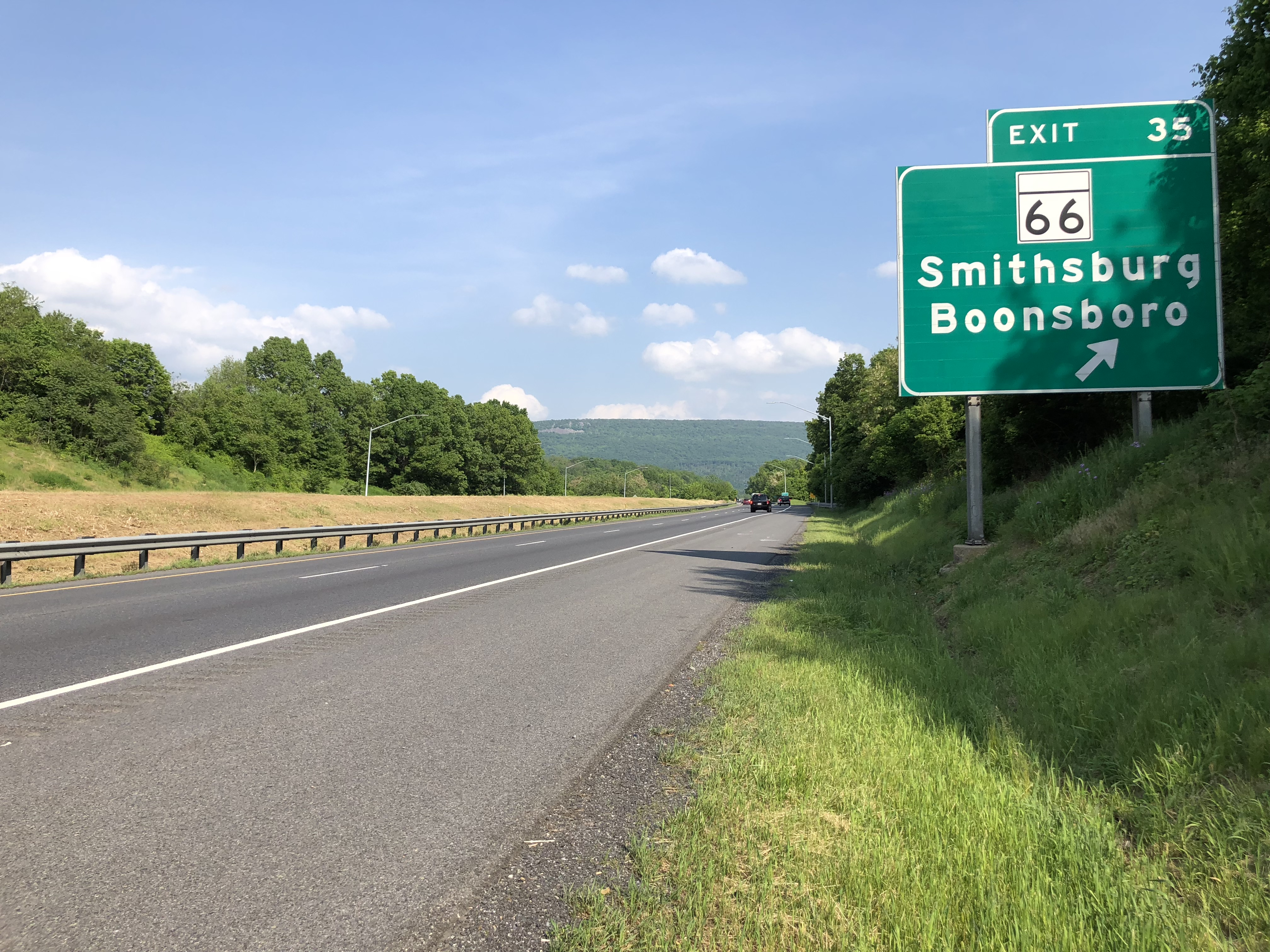
- I-70's exit in Beaver Creek

- Location within Maryland Location within the United States
- Country: United States
- State: Maryland
- County: Washington

Area
  - Total: 1.15 sq mi (2.98 km^{2})
  - Land: 1.15 sq mi (2.98 km^{2})
  - Water: 0 sq mi (0.00 km^{2})
- Elevation: 486 ft (148 m)

Population (2020)
  - Total: 461
  - Density: 401/sq mi (154.9/km^{2})
- Time zone: UTC−5 (Eastern (EST))
  - Summer (DST): UTC−4 (EDT)
- Area codes: 301, 240
- FIPS code: 24-05250
- GNIS feature ID: 2583579

Beaver Creek is an unincorporated community in eastern Washington County, Maryland, United States. Its population was 251 as of the 2010 census. It is located southeast of Hagerstown and north of Boonsboro near U.S. Route 40 and Maryland Route 66. The community is officially included in the Hagerstown Metropolitan Area (Hagerstown-Martinsburg, MD-WV Metropolitan Statistical Area). This town was founded in 1766.

Although Beaver Creek is home to several historic landmarks such as Beaver Creek School and the Doub's Mill Historic District, most of the community's development has occurred since the 1990s, with new and upscale housing for professionals from Hagerstown and from the Washington, D.C. Metro area.

The area is known for its picturesque countryside with rolling hills and a backdrop of South Mountain.

== Demographics ==
Historical population
Census	Pop.	Note	%±
2020	461		—
U.S. Decennial Census

== Gallery ==
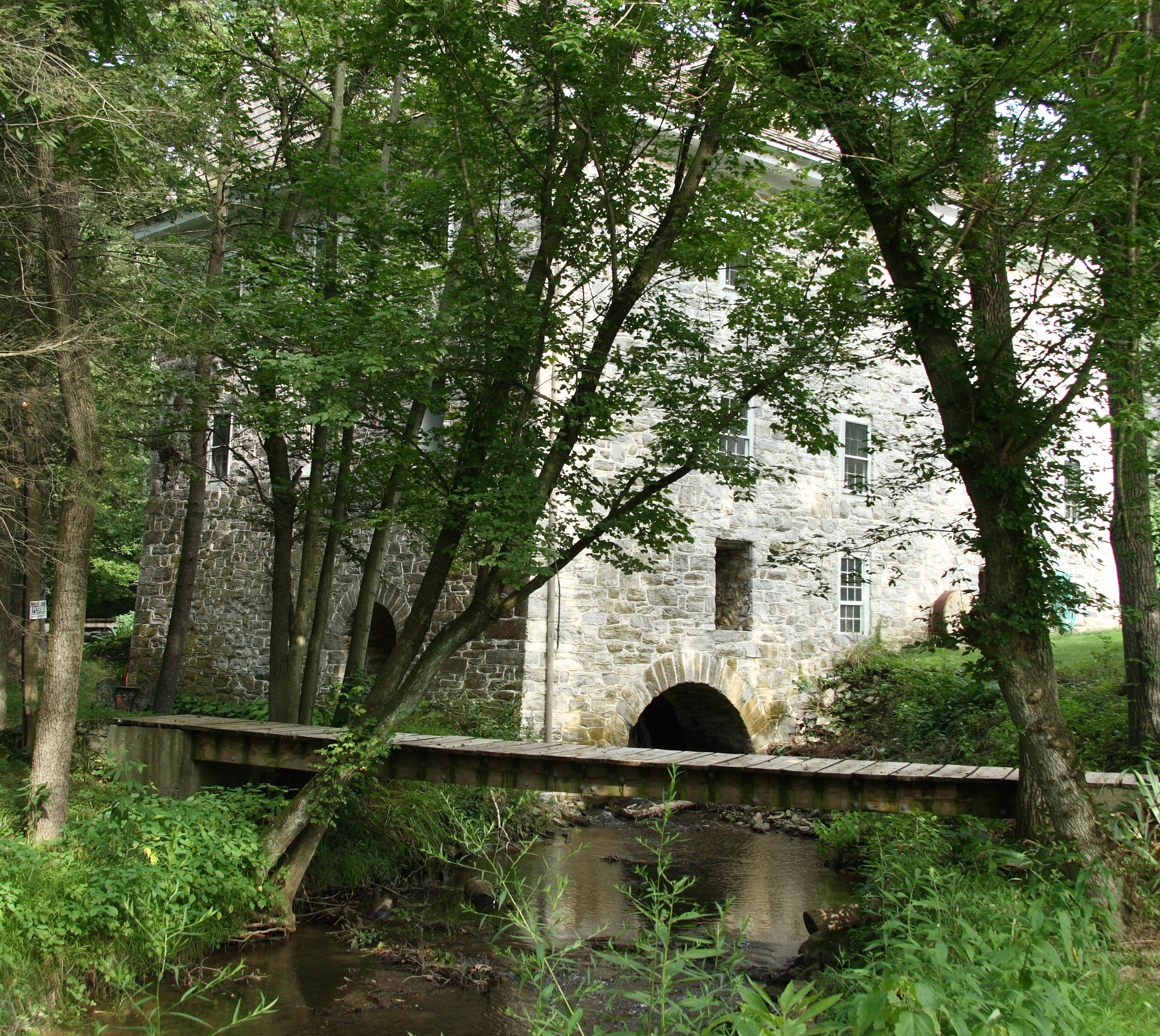
Doub's Mill in Beaver Creek

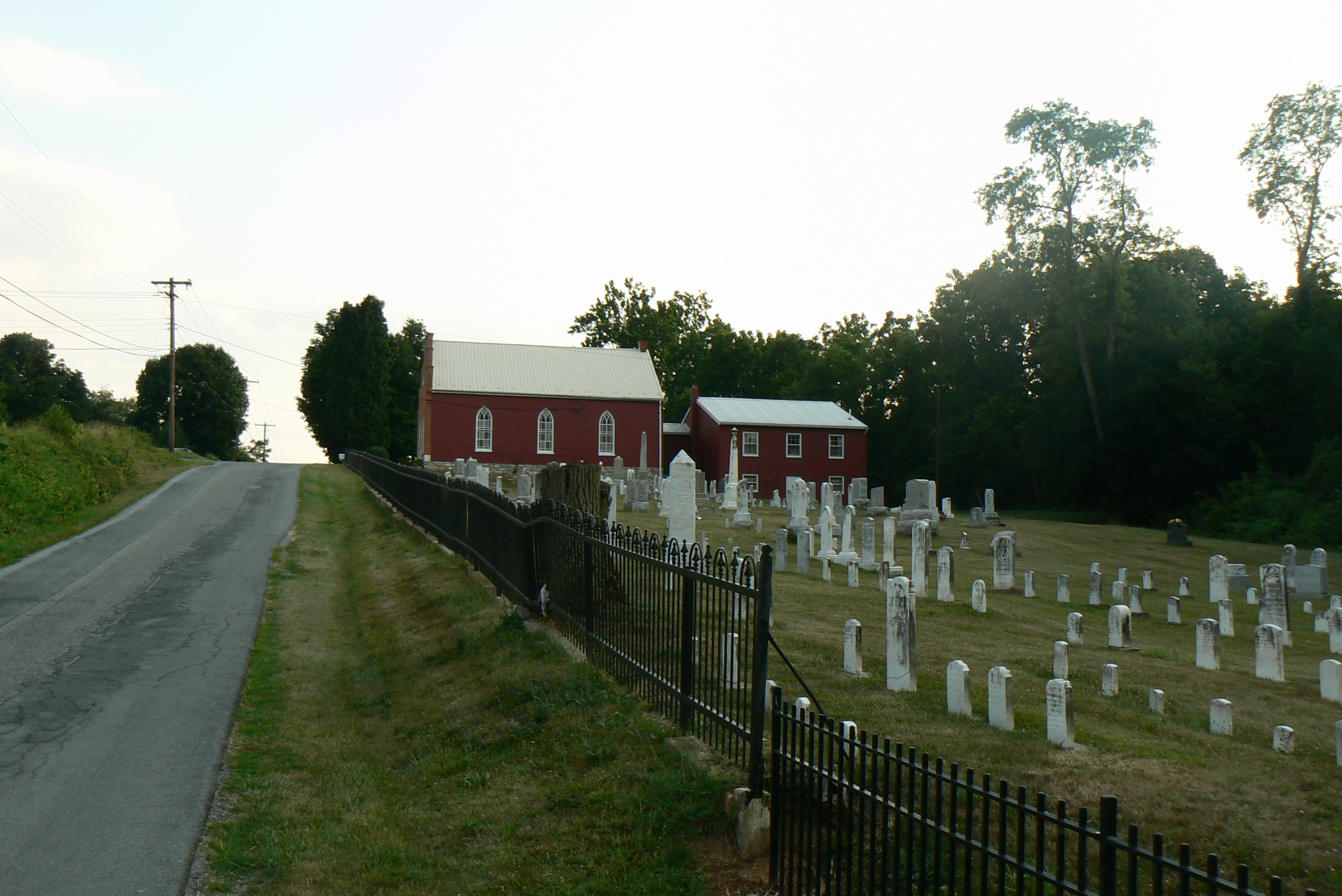
Beaver Creek Church Road

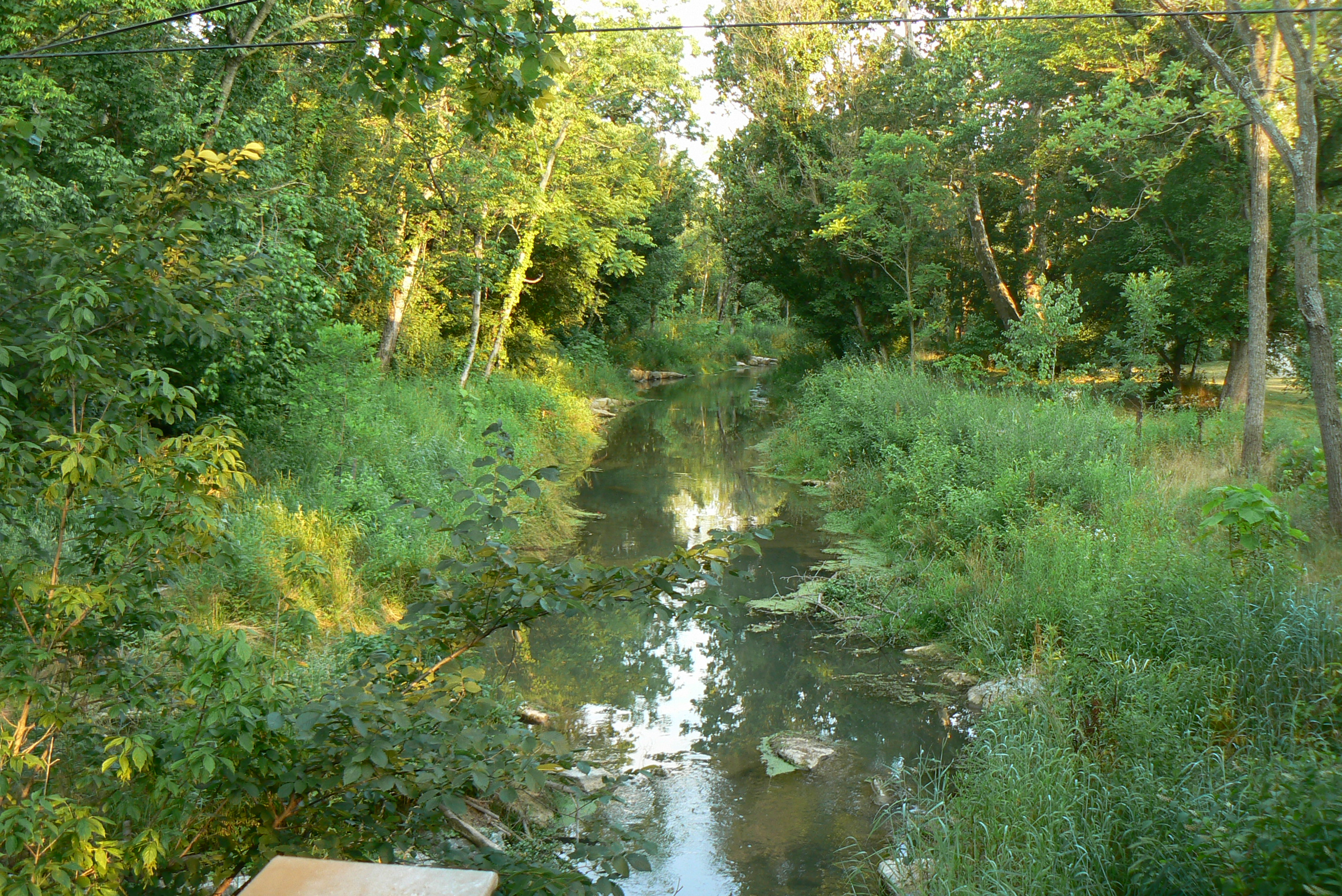
Beaver Creek
