= Concordat of 24 October 1817 =

The Concordat of 24 October 1817 was a concordat signed on 24 October 1817 between the Kingdom of Bavaria and the Holy See.

Secularization of church property and the mediatisation of the ecclesiastical estates in the former Holy Roman Empire marked the demise of the former imperial church and necessitated a reorganization of relations between the German states and the Roman Catholic Church. In 1806 Bavaria opened negotiations for a concordat, which were shelved in 1807, but in 1814 Bavaria's Foreign Minister and Interior Minister began preparing for fresh negotiations. These opened in 1816, with talks led by Bavaria's minister to the Holy See, bishop Johann Casimir Häffelin. On 5 July 1817 he signed the text of a concordat without consulting the Bavarian government, but Bavaria did not wish to snub the Holy See by vetoing that signature and so it was ratified by Maximilian I Joseph of Bavaria on 24 October the same year, after Bavaria renegotiated a few minor changes.

== Sources ==
- Eberhard Weis: Das Konkordat von 1817, das Religions- und Protestantenedikt von 1818, die Tegernseer Erklärung von 1821. In: Ders: Die Begründung des modernen bayerischen Staates unter König Max I. (1799–1825) (§5 Die innere Entwicklung seit Montgelas' Sturz (1817–1825)). In: Alois Schmid (ed.): Handbuch der bayerischen Geschichte. Band 4,1. München 2003, 109–113.
