= Giulio Cesare Zoglio =

Roman Catholic clergyman

Giulio Cesare Zoglio or Julius Caesar Zollio (24 August 1733, Rimini - 13 April 1795) was a Roman Catholic clergyman. In 1785 he became titular bishop of Athenae and the first apostolic nuncio to Munich

== Sources ==
- https://www.historisches-lexikon-bayerns.de/artikel/artikel_44502
