= Rita Calvo Sanz =

Spanish Roman Catholic nun and Roman Curia official (born 1960)

Superior General of Sisters of the Company of Mary, Our Lady
- Incumbent
- Assumed office 2015

Personal details
- Born: 16 October 1960 (age 65) Tordesillas, Spain

María Rita Calvo Sanz O.D.N. (born 16 October, 1960) is a Spanish Roman Catholic religious sister, one of the first seven women appointed as members of the Congregation for Institutes of Consecrated Life and Societies of Apostolic Life. Sister Calvo was appointed on 8 July 2019 by Pope Francis.

== Early life ==
Calvo was born in Tordesillas, Province of Valladolid, Spain. She joined the novitiate in 1980 and took temporary vows with the Sisters of the Company of Mary, Our Lady in 1982. She took her solemn profession vows in 1990.

== Career ==
Calvo trained as a teacher and has a degree in Philosophy and Educational Sciences and a higher degree in Sociology of Education. She worked as a teacher and director of her order's centre in Zaragoza and was a founder and president of the Barró Association in Madrid, which works with people at risk of exclusion. She was a member of the Board of Trustees of the Company of Mary International Solidarity Foundation (FISC), and later the president. From 1994 to 2003 she was part of the leadership team of the Spanish branch of her order, and from 2003 part of the general (international) governance of the order.

On 27 July 2015 she was named Superior General of Sisters of the Company of Mary, Our Lady. She was re-elected in April 2022 for a six-year term.

In 2019 she was appointed as one of the first women to the Congregation for Institutes of Consecrated Life and Societies of Apostolic Life. The other women were Kathleen Appler, Yvonne Reungoat, Françoise Massy, Luigia Coccia, Simona Brambilla and Olga Krizova.
