= Giuseppe Sciacca =

The Most Reverend Giuseppe Sciacca
- Secretary of the Apostolic Signatura
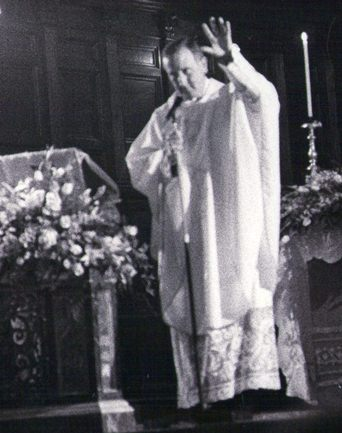
- Sciacca circa 2011.
- Church: Roman Catholic Church
- Appointed: 24 August 2013
- Predecessor: Frans Daneels
- Other posts: Titular Bishop of Fondi (2012-); Auditor General of the Apostolic Camera (2013–)
- Previous posts: Prelate Auditor of the Roman Rota (1999-2011); Titular Bishop of Victoriana (2011-12); Secretary General of the Governorate of the Vatican City State (2011–13); Adjunct Secretary of the Apostolic Signatura (2013–16)

Orders
- Ordination: 7 October 1978
- Consecration: 8 October 2011 by Tarcisio Bertone

Personal details
- Born: Giuseppe Sciacca; 23 February 1955 (age 71) Catania, Sicily, Italy
- Education: Pontifical University of Saint Thomas Aquinas; University of Catania
- Motto: In Tua iustitiae Domine
- Coat of arms

Styles of Giuseppe Sciacca
- Reference style: The Most Reverend
- Spoken style: Your Excellency
- Religious style: Bishop
- Posthumous style: not applicable

Giuseppe Sciacca (born 23 February 1955) is the current Secretary of the Supreme Tribunal of the Apostolic Signatura since his appointment by Pope Francis on July 16, 2016, replacing the retiring Archbishop Frans Daneels. Previously, he had served as Adjunct Secretary of the Apostolic Signatura, since Saturday, 24 August 2013. Previously, he had been serving as the Secretary General of the Governatorate of Vatican City State since his appointment by Benedict XVI on 3 September 2011.

== Biography ==
Sciacca was born in Catania, Italy. After having completed his initial theological studies in Catania he was sent to Rome for further studies. Sciacca is an alumnus of the Pontifical University of St. Thomas Aquinas Angelicum where he earned a degree in canon law. He later obtained a degree in philosophy from the University of Catania. He was ordained on 7 October 1978, belonging to the clergy of the Diocese of Acireale, in addition to pastoral ministry carried out in the Collegiate Church of St. Sebastiano in Acireale, has taught Philosophy and History at the State High Schools and canon law at the Theological Institute of Acireale.

After being appointed as defender of the Bond and Promoter of Justice in the Diocesan and Regional Tribunals of Sicily, has been appointed Judge at the same court in Palermo Regional Siculus. On 25 March 1999 he was appointed as a Prelate Auditor of the Tribunal of the Roman Rota. Sciacca is a well-known scholar of the history of the liturgy and of the figure of Pius XII. But he is also a popular Latin scholar.

On 18 February 2010, the remains of Cardinal Pompedda were reinterred in a specially constructed sarcophagus in the cathedral of Ozieri at the chapel of the Most Holy Sacrament. The requiem mass was celebrated at 5 p.m., presided by Bishop Sergio Pintor of Ozieri. At the end of the mass, Mgr Sciacca, judge of the Roman Rota and a long time collaborator of Cardinal Pompedda, read a special message sent for the occasion by Tarcisio Cardinal Bertone, S.D.B., secretary of State, in the name of Pope Benedict XVI.

On 3 September 2011 he was appointed Titular Bishop of Victoriana and at the same time Secretary-General of the Governatorate of Vatican City State. In this new role he will assist incoming president, Archbishop Giuseppe Bertello in charge of many of the City State’s departments such as its police, observatory, museums, post office and tourist information service.

On 8 October 2011, Sciacca received episcopal consecration from Tarcisio Cardinal Bertone, SDB along with Barthélemy Adoukonou, secretary of the Pontifical Council for Culture. On 13 February 2013, two days after the Pope announced his intention to resign, Pope Benedict appointed Bishop Sciacca to the post of Auditor General of Apostolic Camera.

Catholic Church titles
Preceded by Carlo Maria Vigano	Secretary-General of the Governatorate of the Vatican City State; 3 September 2011 – 24 August 2013	Succeeded by Fernando Vérgez Alzaga, LC
Preceded by Frans Danneels	Secretary of the Apostolic Signatura; 1 September 2016 – present	Succeeded by Incumbent
