= Villamagna in Proconsulari =

Villamagna in Proconsulari was a town in the Roman province of Africa Proconsulare. It is identified with the modern village of Henchir Mettich, located around 50 km from Carthage in Tunisia.

The Bagradas Valley area is a semi-arid district of mostly barren hills that experiences approximately 400 mm–500mm rainfall per annum. The dominant form of land use is the cultivation of olive trees.

A copy of the Lex Manciana was found here.

== Bishopric ==
Villamagna in Proconsulari was also the seat of a Roman Catholic bishopric. Although effectively abolished with the coming of Islam, it remains a titular see of the Roman Catholic Church.

=== Known bishops ===
- Augendo (fl. 411): he attended the Council of Carthage (411), which gathered together the Catholic and Donatist bishops in Roman Africa (Augendo was a Catholic, converted from Donatism)
- Cipriano: was present at the Council of Carthage (646)
- Ragatianus
- Ernst Tewes (3 July 1968–16 January 1998)
- Carlos García Camader (16 February 2002–17 June 2006)
- Gianfranco Ravasi (2007–2010)
- Fernando Vérgez Alzaga (2013–2022)
