= Barthélemy Adoukonou =

Beninese Roman Catholic bishop (1942–2025)

The Right Reverend Barthélemy Adoukonou
- Titular Bishop of Zama Minor
- Church: Roman Catholic Church
- Appointed: 8 October 2011
- Term ended: 27 October 2025
- Predecessor: Elio Sgreccia
- Successor: Vacant
- Other post: Secretary of the Pontifical Council for Culture (2009–2017)

Orders
- Ordination: 16 December 1966 by Gregorio Pietro Agagianian
- Consecration: 8 October 2011 by Tarcisio Bertone, Gianfranco Ravasi, Giuseppe Bertello

Personal details
- Born: 24 August 1942 Abomey, French Dahomey, French West Africa
- Died: 27 October 2025 (aged 83) Cotonou, Benin

Styles of Barthélemy Adoukonou
- Reference style: The Right Reverend
- Spoken style: Your Excellency
- Religious style: Bishop
- Posthumous style: not applicable

Barthélemy Adoukonou (24 August 1942 – 27 October 2025) was a Beninese Catholic bishop. He was the secretary of the Pontifical Council for Culture, beginning with his appointment by Pope Benedict XVI on 3 December 2009. He was previously secretary-general both of the Conférence Épiscopale Régionale de l'Afrique de l'Ouest Francophone and of the Association of Episcopal Conferences of Anglophone West Africa, and a consultor of the Pontifical Council for Promoting Christian Unity. As well as the languages of the two West African international conferences, he spoke Italian and German.

== Ecclesiastical career ==
Adoukonou was born in Abomey, Benin, on 24 August 1942. He was ordained a priest on 16 December 1966. After teaching at the Saint Joan of Arc minor seminary of Ouidah (1967–1968), and being chaplain and teacher at the Aufiais College in Cotonou (1968–1970), and assistant parish priest of St Francis of Assisi at Bohicon, Abomey (1970–1971), he spent 1971 to 1977 continuing his studies in religious sociology in Paris, and then in theology at the University of Regensburg where he earned his doctorate. He was meant to present his dissertation to Joseph Ratzinger in June 1977, but Ratzinger suddenly asked him to finish it earlier so he could move the presentation forward to March. Between 1977 and 1984 he was rector of the Minor Seminary of St. Paul at Djimi, Abomey, missionary professor at the University of West Africa in Abidjan and professor of methodology of research in human and social sciences at the University of the State of Abomey-Calavi and at the Major Seminary of Saint Gall in Ouidah, Benin. From 1988 to 1999 he was rector of the Benin Propaedeutic Seminary at Missérété, Porto Novo.

In the late 1970s, Adoukonou was a student of the then professor Joseph Ratzinger at the University of Regensburg. He kept in touch with his former professor, turned archbishop, then a month later, cardinal, going on to become prefect of the Congregation for the Doctrine of the Faith, and finally Pope in 2005 under the name of Benedict XVI. At the end of 2009, when the nomination of the new secretary of the Pontifical Council for Culture was due to take place, its president Gianfranco Ravasi spoke to Pope Benedict suggesting the possible addition of a figure from Africa to assist him as he felt that the Roman Curia was at risk of becoming too Italianised. Benedict seized the opportunity stating: "I have a candidate", giving Adoukonou's name to Ravasi. In December 2009, Adoukonou was appointed the secretary, or second-ranking official, of the Pontifical Council for Culture.

Adoukonou, was a member of the Ratzinger Schulerkreis (an informal group composed of Ratzinger's former students) and accordingly, he participated in its 2011 annual meeting which discussed new evangelization.

On 10 September 2011, Adoukonou was appointed titular bishop of Zama Minor. He received episcopal consecration at the hands of the Cardinal Secretary of State, Tarcisio Bertone, on 8 October 2011 along with Giuseppe Sciacca.

On 29 December 2011, he was appointed a member of the Pontifical Council for Social Communications for a five-year renewable term.

Adoukonou died on 27 October 2025, at the age of 83, at the Centre national hospitalier universitaire in Cotonou.
