= Henchir Mettich =

Town in Tunisia

Coordinates: 36.569469°N 9.366642°E

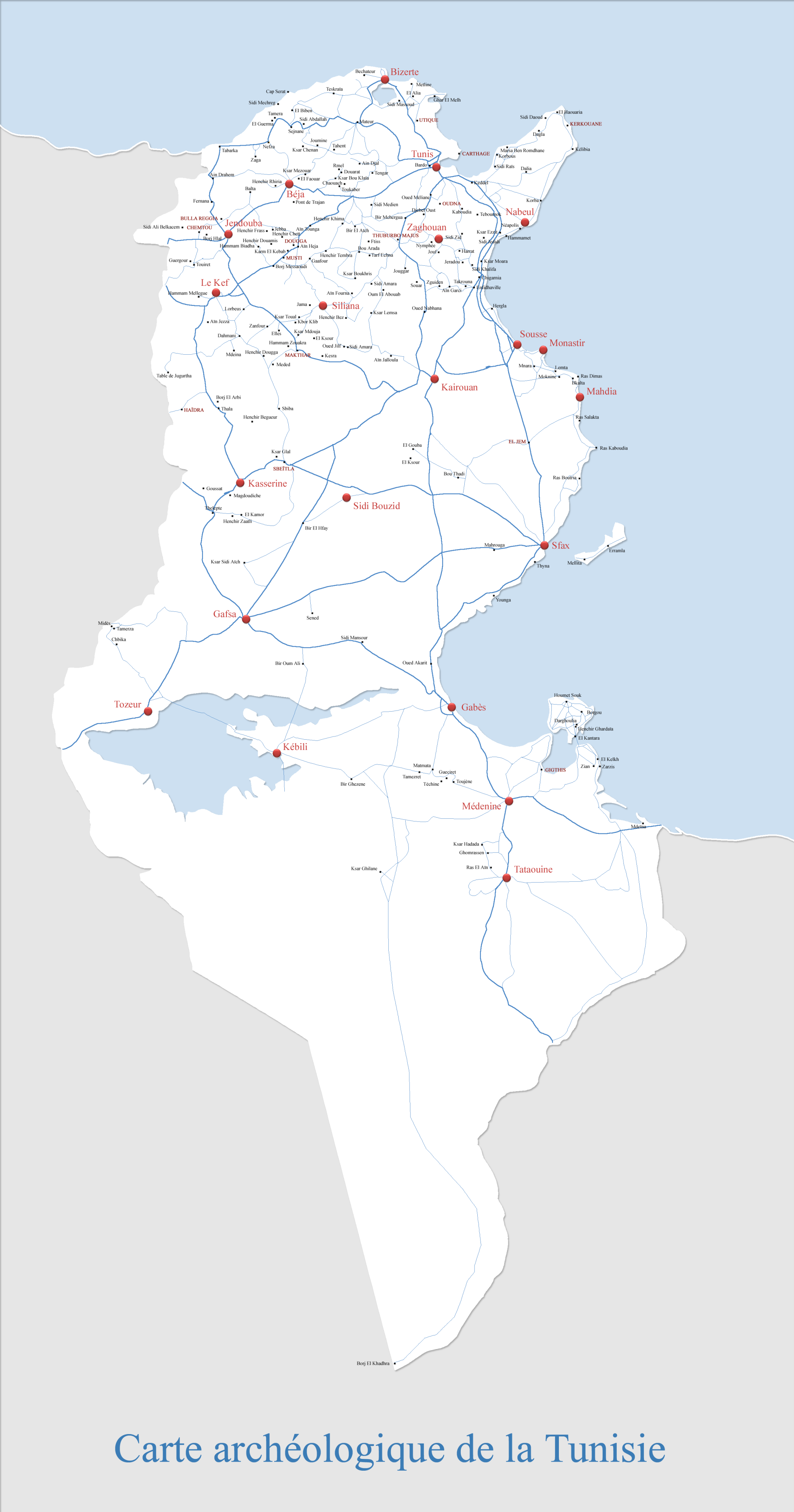
Archaeology map of Tunisia

Henchir Mettich is a town of the Bagradas Valley region in Tunisia, c.50 km west of the ancient city of Carthage. The area around Henchir Mettich is currently a semi-arid district of mostly barren hills (approximately 400 mm-500mm rainfall per annum), some of which are currently cultivated with olive trees.

It is best known for the Lex Manciana inscription found there.

== History ==
During Roman times this part of the Maghreb of North Africa was much more fertile than today and supported a much larger population. Following the Third Punic War the area was incorporated into Africa Proconsularis of the Roman Empire. They found an area already renown for its productivity Due to the high agricultural fertility of the Bagradas region, the area was developed with many Imperial Estates, one of which was Henchir Mettich. Mappalia Siga.

We know from epigraphical remains that the settlement then known as Villamagna in Proconsulari (Villa Magna Variana, or Mappalia Siga) had coloni status. The Lex Manciana found at the town was a Roman law relating to these estates.

Throughout its existence the town was ruled by Catholic Roman, Arian Vandal and Orthodox rulers from Byzantium. At the end of the 7th century the city ceased to be part of Christendom with the Muslim conquest of the Maghreb.
