= Tiziana Merletti =

Italian religious sister (born 1959)

Reverend Sister Tiziana Merletti SFP

Secretary of the Dicastery for Institutes of Consecrated Life and Societies of Apostolic Life
- Incumbent
- Assumed office 22 May 2025
- Appointed by: Pope Leo XIV
- Preceded by: Simona Brambilla

Superior General of the Franciscan Sisters of the Poor
- In office 2004–2013

Personal details
- Born: 30 September 1959 (age 67) Pineto, Italy
- Education: Pontifical Lateran University
- Occupation: Canon lawyer

Tiziana Merletti SFP (born 30 September 1959) is an Italian religious sister who serves as Secretary of the Dicastery for Institutes of Consecrated Life and Societies of Apostolic Life since her appointment on 22 May 2025 by Pope Leo XIV. She is the second woman to serve in this position, after her predecessor Simona Brambilla, who in 2025 became the first woman prefect in the Roman Curia.

== Biography ==
Merletti was born 30 September 1959 in Pineto. She received a degree in jurisprudence from D'Annunzio University of Chieti–Pescara in 1984 and took first vows with the Franciscan Sisters of the Poor in 1986. She then received a doctorate in canon law at the Pontifical Lateran University in 1992. From 2004 to 2013, she served as Superior General of her religious order, and from 2013 to 2025 as a lecturer in canon law at the Pontifical University Antonianum. Merletti is also a canon lawyer for the International Union of Superiors General.
