= Imperial estate (Roman) =

An imperial estate (patrimonium or res privata) in the Roman Empire it was the "personal property of members of the imperial family, as distinct from property belonging to the Roman state" (ager publicus). On the Emperor's death, these properties passed to his successor, and not to his private heirs.

Imperial estates were not only farming estates, or latifundia, but also pastures (saltus) and mines (metalla). Management of imperial estates within a province was the responsibility of a procurator who, in turn, reported to the procurator patrimonii in Rome. The procurator leased the estate to a conductor, a contractor, or administrator. On small estates, the conductor might farm the land himself. On larger tracts, the conductor sub-let the land to coloni, tenant-farmers. Coloni were free men, and not bound to the land like later serfs. The coloni paid the conductor in shares of their crops, and were also obliged to perform other services a few days a year.

"At one period or another there seem to have been estates in most provinces of the empire." Estates were acquired in various ways: by "confiscation, acquisition by conquest and inheritance." Imperial estates might be disposed of through sales or given as gifts, to individuals, to temples, and later to Christian churches. Land which remained imperial property was usually leased out. It is difficult to estimate how much land was directly owned by the emperor. In North Africa in the fifth century, land registers show that he owned around 15–18%.

== See also ==
- Lex Manciana
- Villa Magna
