= Vincenzo Lapuma =

His Eminence Vincenzo Lapuma
- Prefect of the Congregation for Religious
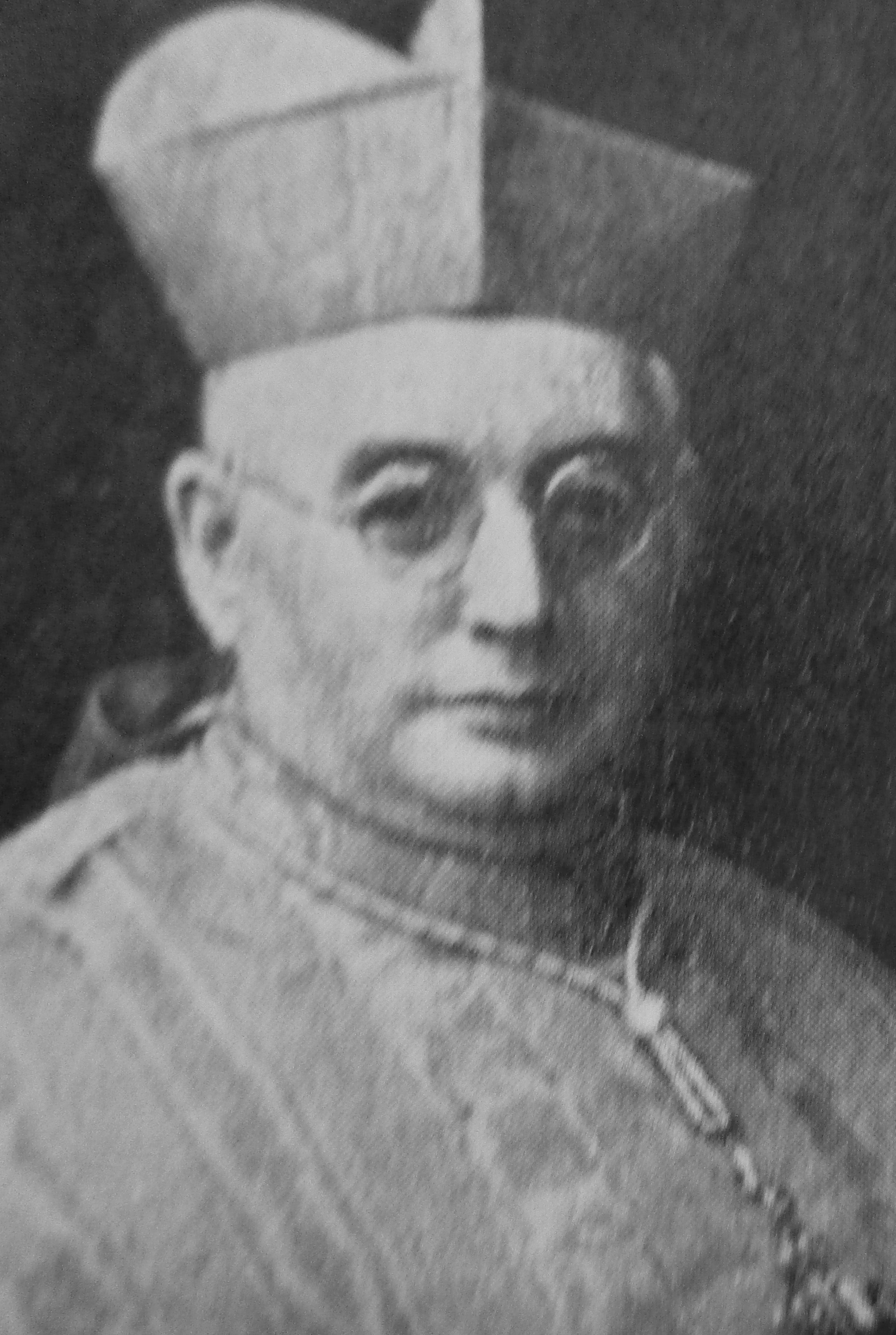
- Church: Roman Catholic Church
- Appointed: 31 December 1935
- Term ended: 4 November 1943
- Predecessor: Alexis-Henri-Marie Lépicier
- Successor: Luigi Lavitrano
- Other post: Cardinal-Deacon of Santi Cosma e Damiano (1935–43)
- Previous posts: Undersecretary of the Congregation for Religious (1915–25); Secretary of the Congregation for Religious (1925–35); Pro-Prefect of the Congregation for Religious (1935)

Orders
- Ordination: 13 September 1896
- Created cardinal: 16 December 1935 by Pope Pius XI
- Rank: Cardinal-Deacon

Personal details
- Born: Vincenzo Lapuma; 22 January 1874 Palermo, Kingdom of Italy
- Died: 4 November 1943 (aged 69) Rome, Kingdom of Italy
- Buried: Campo Verano
- Education: Pontifical Roman Athenaeum Saint Apollinare
- Motto: In labore requies

Styles of Vincenzo Lapuma
- Reference style: His Eminence
- Spoken style: Your Eminence
- Informal style: Cardinal
- See: none

Vincenzo Lapuma (22 January 1874 – 4 November 1943) was an Italian Cardinal of the Catholic Church. He spent forty years in the Roman Curia and served as prefect of Sacred Congregation for Religious from 1935 until his death. He was raised to the rank of cardinal in 1935.

== Biography ==
Lapuma was born in Palermo, and studied at the seminary in Palermo and at the Pontifical Roman Athenaeum S. Apollinare in Rome. He was ordained to the priesthood on 13 September 1896, and then served as a professor at the same Athenaeum and as auditor of the Sacred Congregation for Bishops and Regulars until 1908.

Lapuma was raised to the rank of Privy Chamberlain of His Holiness on 8 July 1907, and became Undersecretary of Sacred Congregation for Religious on 16 February 1916. After being made a Domestic Prelate of His Holiness on 20 November 1917, he was named Secretary of Sacred Congregation for Religious on 7 April 1925. As Secretary, he served as the second-highest official of that dicastery, successively under Cardinals Camillo Laurenti and Alexis Lépicier, OSM.

Pope Pius XI created him Cardinal-Deacon of Santi Cosma e Damiano in the consistory of 16 December 1935. On 22 December 1935, Cardinal Lapuma was appointed as Pro-Prefect of Sacred Congregation for Religious, rising to become full Prefect on the following 31 December. He was one of the cardinals who participated in the 1939 papal conclave that selected Pope Pius XII.

Lapuma died in Rome, at age 69. He is buried in the Campo Verano.

Catholic Church titles
| Preceded by Alexis Lépicier | Prefect of Sacred Congregation of Religious; 1935–1943 | Succeeded by Luigi Lavitrano |
