= Politics of Vatican City =

The politics of Vatican City take place in a framework of a theocratic absolute elective monarchy, in which the Pope, religiously speaking, the leader of the Catholic Church and Bishop of Rome, exercises ex officio supreme legislative, executive, and judicial power over the Vatican City as it is being governed by the Holy See, a rare case of non-hereditary monarchy.

The term "Holy See" refers to the composite of the authority, jurisdiction, and sovereignty vested in the Pope and his advisers to direct the worldwide Catholic Church. It is therefore quite distinct from the Vatican City state, which was created in 1929, through the Lateran treaties between the Holy See and Italy.

As the "central government" of the Catholic Church, the Holy See has a legal personality that allows it to enter into treaties as the juridical equal of a state and to send and receive diplomatic representatives. It has formal diplomatic relations with 179 nations. The State of Vatican City, for its part, is recognized under international law as a sovereign territory. Unlike the Holy See, it does not receive or send diplomatic representatives, and the Holy See acts on its behalf in international affairs.

== Election ==
The pope is elected in the papal conclave, composed of all the cardinal electors which are bishops and archbishops appointed by the pope, now limited to all the cardinals below the age of 80, after the death or resignation of the previous Pope. The Conclave is held in the Sistine Chapel, where all the electors are locked in (Latin: cum clave) until the election for which a two-thirds majority is required. The faithful can follow the results of the polls, usually two in the morning and two in the evening, until election, by a chimney-top, visible from St. Peter's Square. The voting papers are burnt in a stove attached to the chimney. Additives make the smoke black (fumata nera) in a case of no election, or white (fumata bianca) when the new pope is elected.

The Dean of the Sacred College (Cardinale Decano) will then ask the freshly elected pope to choose his pastoral name. As soon as the pope is dressed with the white cassock, the Senior Cardinal-Deacon (Cardinale Protodiacono) appears on the major balcony of St. Peter's façade to introduce the new pope, with the Latin sentence Annuntio vobis gaudium magnum: habemus papam (I announce to you a great joy: We have a Pope).

== Administration of Vatican City ==
The flag of Vatican City

As with almost all monarchies, the executive, legislative and judicial power of government reside in the crown, in this case in the office of the Bishop of Rome (the pope). As with many monarchies, the pope exercises this power through other organs which act on his behalf and in his name.

The pope commonly delegates the internal administration of Vatican City to various bodies and officials. However, according to the Fundamental Law of Vatican City State, "The Supreme Pontiff, sovereign of Vatican City State, has the fullness of legislative, executive, and judicial powers" for Vatican City.

The pope delegates legislative authority for the state to the unicameral Pontifical Commission for Vatican City State. This commission was established in 1939 by Pope Pius XII. It consists of seven Cardinals appointed by the pope for five-year terms. Laws passed by the Commission must be approved by the pope through the Secretariat of State prior to being published and taking effect.

The President of the Pontifical Commission is also the President of the Governorate of Vatican City, to whom the pope delegates executive authority for the state. The president is assisted by a Secretary General and a Vice Secretary General. Each of these officers is appointed by the pope for a five-year term. Actions of the President must be approved by the commission. Various departments and offices report to the Governorate, handling such issues as communications, internal security, fire protection, and the Vatican Museums. The Corpo della Gendarmeria is the state's security and police force, not the Pontifical Swiss Guard, which is an organ of the Holy See, not of Vatican City.

== Executive ==
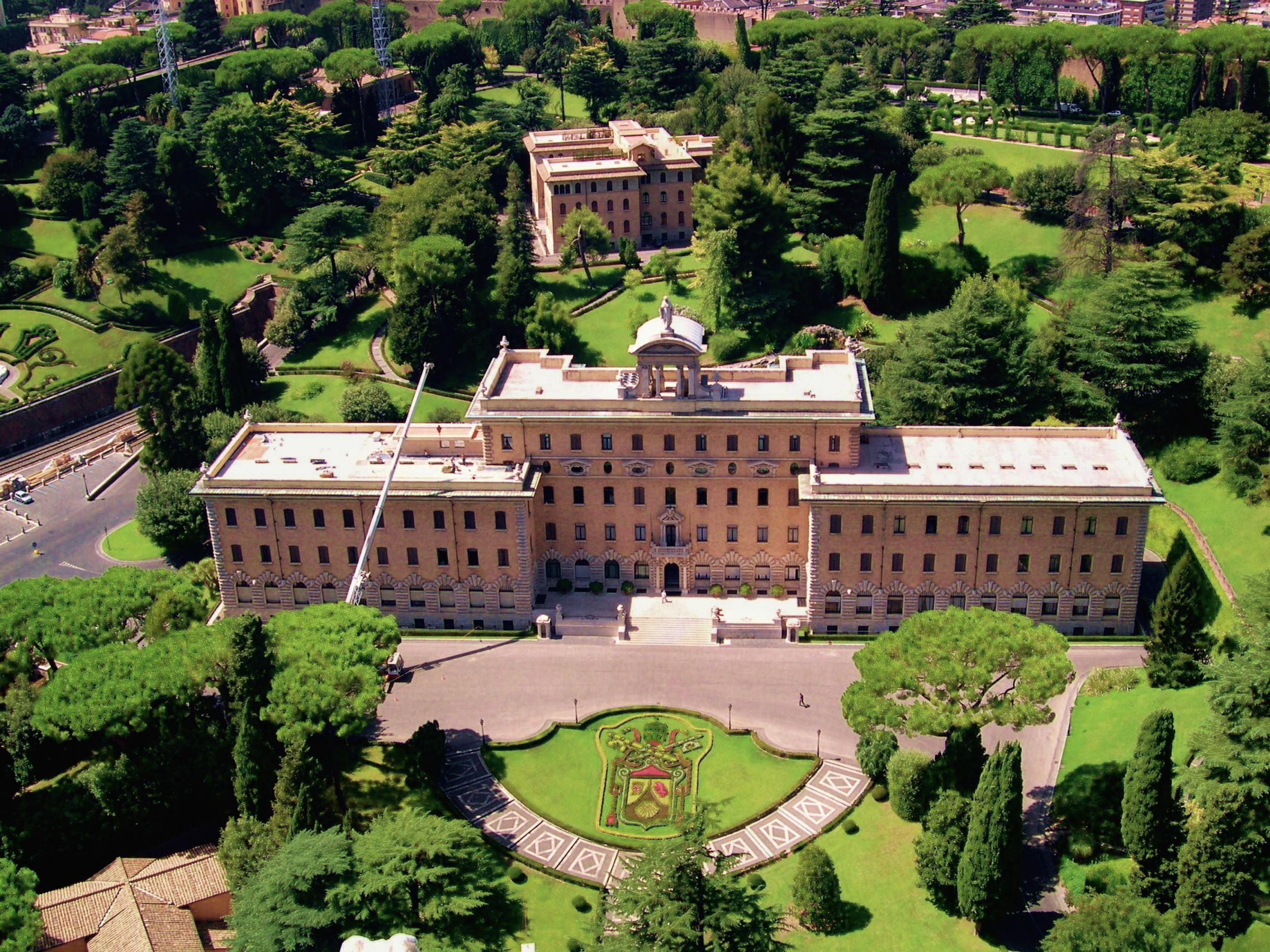
The palace of the Governorate of Vatican City State

Main office-holders
Office	Name	Party	Since
Sovereign	Leo XIV		8 May 2025
President of the Governorate	Raffaella Petrini		1 March 2025

The Pope is ex officio sovereign and head of state of the Vatican City State since 1929. He delegates executive authority to the President of the Pontifical Commission for Vatican City State, who is ex officio President of the Governorate and de facto head of government of Vatican. The president is appointed by the Pope for a five-year term, but may be removed at any time by the pope.

The president reports all important matters to the Secretariat of State, the Pope's chief everyday advisory body, which is consulted on all matters, even if they belong to the specific competence of the Commission for Vatican City State or, for instance, that of the Congregation for Catholic Education. The Secretariat of State is not thereby considered to hold responsibility for such matters, and the Cardinal Secretary of State is not seen as heading the Vatican City State or the various departments of the Roman Curia, other than the Secretariat of State itself.

Vatican City is a member of CEPT, Eutelsat, International Grains Council, Intelsat, ITU and UPU.

Vatican City does not have direct diplomatic relations with other states. Its foreign relations are managed by the Holy See. See Holy See – Relationship with the Vatican City and other territories.

== Legislative ==
A unicameral Pontifical Commission for Vatican City State, appointed by the Pope, operates as legislative branch, proposing law and policy to the Pope. Prior to taking effect, laws and policies passed by the commission must be approved by the Supreme Pontiff, through the Secretariat of State, and be published in the Italian-language supplement of the Acta Apostolicae Sedis that deals with Vatican City State matters.

The "Councillors of the State" give their consultation in the drafting of legislation. They may be consulted either alone or collegially.

== Judiciary ==
The seal of Vatican City State

As a sovereign state, Vatican City has a legal system distinct from that of Italy. The pope's judicial authority is exercised through the Prefect of the Supreme Tribunal of the Apostolic Signatura, as he by law serves also as the President of the Cassation Court of Vatican City (i.e. the highest court of appeal).

The population of the state is a few hundred. Each day outsiders come there to work. 18 million people visit there each year.

In one year its courts tried 640 civil cases and 226 penal cases.

The penal cases are usually for minor crimes such as pickpocketing. If such crimes are committed in Saint Peter's Square, the perpetrators may be arrested and tried by the Italian authorities, since that area is normally patrolled by Italian policemen.

Under the terms of article 22 of the Lateran Treaty, Italy will, at the request of the Holy See, punish individuals for crimes committed within Vatican City and will itself proceed against the person who committed the offence, if that person takes refuge in Italian territory. Persons accused of crimes recognized as such both in Italy and in Vatican City that are committed in Italian territory will be handed over to the Italian authorities if they take refuge in Vatican City or in buildings that under the treaty enjoy immunity.

Vatican City has no prison system, apart from a few detention cells for pre-trial detention. People convicted of committing crimes in the Vatican serve terms in Italian prisons (Polizia Penitenziaria), with costs covered by the Vatican.

Pope Francis signed a new motu proprio into law in March 2020, which reforms the Vatican's judicial system. The motu proprio, titled Law CCCLI, updates the laws governing the Vatican's judiciary system and also replaced the previous judicial system which was founded in 1987.

The new law provides for greater independence of judicial bodies and magistrates dependent on the Pope. It also specifies the requirements for the appointment of judges and it simplifies the judicial system while increasing the staff of the court. Furthermore, it provides a head for the Office of the Promoter of Justice (prosecutor's office), and sets out a standardized procedure for possible disciplinary action against certified advocates.

== See also ==
- Governor of Vatican City
- Index of Vatican City-related articles
