= Fernando Vérgez Alzaga =

Spanish Catholic prelate

His Eminence Fernando Vérgez Alzaga L.C.
- President Emeritus of the Governorate of Vatican City State
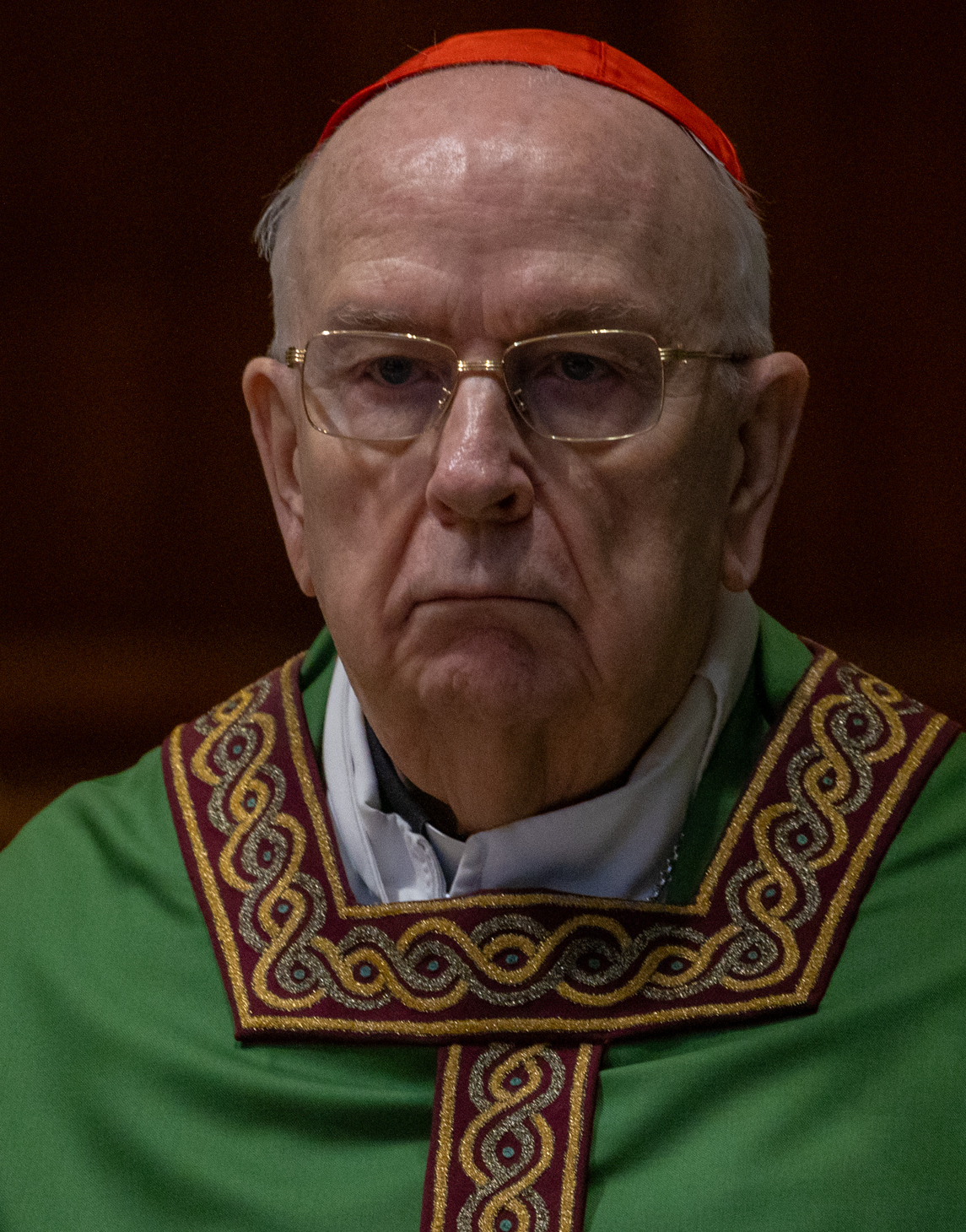
- Vérgez in 2024
- Church: Catholic Church
- Appointed: 8 September 2021
- Installed: 1 October 2021
- Term ended: 1 March 2025
- Predecessor: Giuseppe Bertello
- Successor: Raffaella Petrini
- Other post: Cardinal-Deacon of Santa Maria della Mercede e Sant'Adriano a Villa Albani (2022–)
- Previous posts: Director of the Internet Office of the Holy See (2004–08); Director of the Directorate of Telecommunications and Information Systems of the Vatican City State (2008–21); Secretary General of the Governorate for the Vatican City State (2013–21); Titular Bishop of Villamagna in Proconsulari (2013–21); Titular Archbishop of Villamanga in Proconsulari (2021–22)

Orders
- Ordination: 26 November 1969 by Ildebrando Antoniutti
- Consecration: 15 November 2013 by Pope Francis
- Created cardinal: 27 August 2022 by Pope Francis
- Rank: Cardinal-Deacon

Personal details
- Born: Fernando Vérgez Alzaga; 1 March 1945 (age 81) Salamanca, Spanish State
- Education: Pontifical Gregorian University
- Motto: Christus in vobis spes gloriae (Christ in you, the hope of glory)
- Coat of arms

Styles of Fernando Vérgez Alzaga
- Reference style: His Eminence
- Spoken style: Your Eminence
- Religious style: Cardinal
- Informal style: Cardinal

Fernando Vérgez Alzaga L.C. (born 1 March 1945) is a Spanish Catholic prelate who served as President of the Pontifical Commission and Governorate for Vatican City State from 2021 to 2025. He was Secretary General of the Governorate of Vatican City State from 2013 to 2021, and before that, director of the Vatican City State Telecommunications Directorate.

He has worked in the Roman Curia since 1972. He was made a bishop in 2013 and given the personal title of archbishop in 2021. Pope Francis made him a cardinal on 27 August 2022. He is the first member of the Legionaries of Christ to become a cardinal. He is a member of the Council of Cardinals.

== Life ==
Vérgez was born in Salamanca on 1 March 1945. On 25 December 1965 he made a profession of faith with the clerical congregation of the Legion of Christ, and on 26 November 1969 was ordained as a priest by Cardinal Ildebrando Antoniutti. Vérgez studied at the Pontifical Gregorian University in Rome, earning degrees in philosophy and theology, and then a diploma as an archivist from the Vatican Secret Archives.

In 1972 he entered the service of the Roman Curia as an assistant in the Congregation for Institutes of Consecrated Life and Societies of Apostolic Life. In April 1984 he moved to the Pontifical Council for the Laity. He was appointed head of the ordinary section of the Administration of the Patrimony of the Apostolic See and in June 2004 became head of the Internet Office of the Holy See. On 1 February 2008, Pope Benedict XVI appointed Vérgez as Telecommunications Director of the Vatican City, with the Poste Vaticane. On 30 August 2013, Pope Francis promoted him to be Secretary General of the Governorate of Vatican City State, succeeding Bishop Giuseppe Sciacca.

On 15 October 2013 Pope Francis named Vérgez titular bishop of Villamagna in Proconsulari, and on 15 November, in St Peter's Basilica, he was consecrated as a bishop by the pope, assisted by Cardinal Giuseppe Bertello and Bishop Brian Farrell.

On 5 October 2020, Pope Francis appointed him to the five-member commission for reserved matters, a financial oversight board responsible for monitoring contracts that fall outside normal procedures and which for security reasons are not made public.

On 8 September 2021, Pope Francis appointed him to succeed Cardinal Giuseppe Bertello as President of the Pontifical Commission for Vatican City State and President of the Governorate of Vatican City State, effective 1 October 2021. He was also given the personal title of archbishop.

On 27 August 2022, Pope Francis made him a cardinal deacon, assigning him the deaconry Santa Maria della Mercede e Sant'Adriano a Villa Albani.

On 15 February 2025, Pope Francis named Raffaella Petrini to succeed Vérgez as president of the Pontifical Commission for Vatican City State and president of the Governorate of Vatican City State, effective 1 March 2025, his 80th birthday.

== See also ==
- Cardinals created by Pope Francis

Catholic Church titles
Preceded by Giuseppe Sciacca	Secretary-General of the Governatorate of the Vatican City State; 30 August 2013 – 30 September 2021	Succeeded by Raffaella Petrini
Preceded by Giuseppe Bertello	President of the Governorate of the Vatican City State; President of the Pontifical Commission for the Vatican City State; 1 October 2021 – 1 March 2025	Succeeded by Raffaella Petrini
