= Zama (Tunisia) =

Site of 202 BC battle between Rome and Carthage

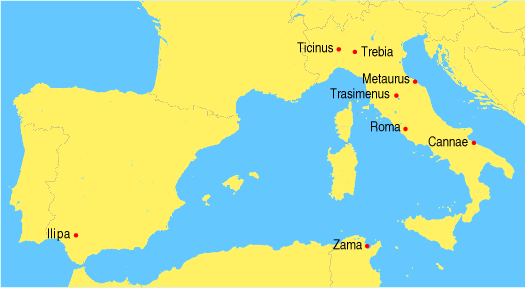
- Second Punic War battle sites

- Location within Tunisia
- 36°06′43″N 9°17′08″E
- Location: Tunisia
- Region: Siliana Governorate

Zama, also known as Xama, is a town in Tunisia best known for its association with the Battle of Zama, in which Scipio Africanus defeated Hannibal on 19 October in 202 BC, ending the Second Punic War. The Battle of Zama was a victory for the Roman Republic and diminished the power of Ancient Carthage.

== Location of the battle ==
The battle did not in fact take place in the vicinity of Zama. Polybius states that Hannibal, after first camping at Zama, moved to another camp just before the battle; and Livy says that Scipio's camp, near which the battle took place, was at Naraggara, present-day Sakiet Sidi Youssef on the border between Tunisia and Algeria.

== Zama Regia ==
More than one town in what became the Roman province of Africa was called Zama. The Zama associated with the battle is likely to be the Zama Regia mentioned in Sallust's account of the Jugurthine War as besieged unsuccessfully by Quintus Caecilius Metellus Numidicus. Later, Zama Regia was the capital of Juba I of Numidia (60–46 BC) and so, in the view of the Oxford Classical Dictionary, it was called Zama Regia (Royal Zama). Scullard prefers the suggestion that the town got the appellation "Regia" before the destruction of Carthage in 146 BC, indicating that it was not under Carthaginian control and belonged to the kingdom of Numidia.

In 41 BC Zama Regia was captured by Titus Sextius, who, having previously been one of Julius Caesar's legates in Gaul, was then governor of the province of Africa on behalf of the Second Triumvirate. As a Roman town, Zama Regia is mentioned in an inscription found at Rome as "Colonia Aelia Hadriana Augusta Zama Regia", showing that under Hadrian (Publius Aelius Hadrianus Augustus), it had been granted the rank of colonia. Zama Regia is mentioned also in the Tabula Peutingeriana.

== Zama Maior and Zama Minor ==
Polybius used the Greek phrase Ζάμα Μείζων, corresponding to Latin Zama Maior, and implying the existence of a smaller town called Zama, a Zama Minor.

=== Bishopric ===
The town was in antiquity the seat of a Christian bishopric which survives today as a titular see of the Roman Catholic Church. A Bishop Dialogus of Zama Maior was at the Council of Carthage (411), and a Bishop Marcellus of Zama Minor participated in the Synod of Carthage of AD 255. Barthélemy Adoukonou was the Bishop since 2011.

Both Zama are included in the Catholic Church's list of titular sees, which does not use the name "Zama Regia".

== Localization ==
It is agreed that one Zama must have been at present-day Jama, 30 kilometres north of Maktar, and a shorter distance west-northwest of Siliana. An incomplete inscription found here mentions "Zama M...", interpreted by some as "Zama Maior", by others as "Zama Minor". Recent systematic excavation of Jama has discovered another incomplete inscription that appears to refer unambiguously to it as "Zama Regia". This seems to put paid to the views expressed by Scullard and others that Jama corresponds neither to Sallust's description of Zama Regia nor to the distances indicated in the Tabula Peutingeriana. It appears also to indicate that the towns called Zama were two, not three.

Other sites taken into consideration are Sidi Abd el Djedidi, situated 40 kilometres east of Jama, and Sebaa Biar, the latter of which seems to fit Sallust's account better.
