= Jeanne de Lestonnac =

French Roman Catholic saint

Saint Jeanne de Lestonnac ODN
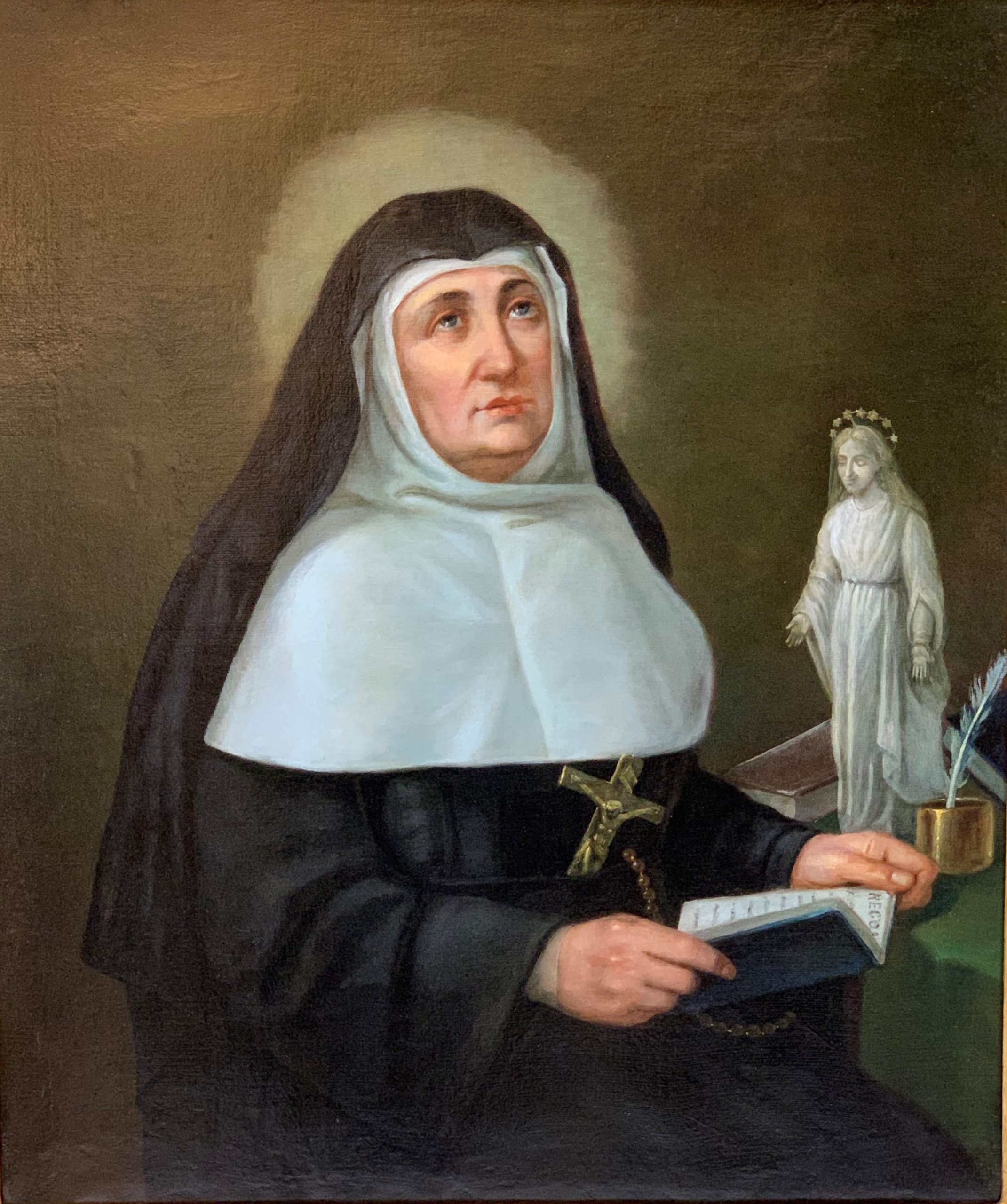
- Born: December 27, 1556; Bordeaux, Kingdom of France
- Died: February 2, 1640 (aged 83)
- Venerated in: Roman Catholic Church (Sisters of the Company of Mary, Our Lady)
- Beatified: 1900 by Pope Leo XIII
- Canonized: May 15, 1949 by Pope Pius XII
- Feast: May 15
- Patronage: abuse victims, people rejected by religious orders, widows

Jeanne de Lestonnac, ODN (December 27, 1556 – February 2, 1640), also known as Joan of Lestonnac, was a French Catholic nun who founded the Sisters of the Company of Mary, Our Lady in 1607. The institute, approved by Pope Paul V in 1607, was the first religious order of women-teachers approved by the Catholic Church.

Lestonnac was canonized by Pope Pius XII in 1949 and her feast day is May 15.

== Biography ==
=== Early years ===
De Lestonnac was born in Bordeaux in 1556 to Richard de Lestonnac, a member of the Parlement of Bordeaux, and Jeanne Eyquem, the sister of the noted philosopher, Michel Eyquem de Montaigne. She grew up in a time when the conflict between the Protestant reformists and the defenders of the Catholic faith was at its height. This was evident in her own family. While her mother became an enthusiastic Calvinist and tried to persuade her to convert, her father and her uncle Montaigne adhered to the Catholic faith and were her support in remaining a Catholic.

At the age of 17 De Lestonnac married Gaston de Montferrant, with whom she had seven children, three of whom died in infancy. She was married for 24 years when her husband died. This marked the beginning of a very painful period in her life, with the further loss, within seven months, of her father, uncle and eldest son.

=== Religious life ===
Following her husband's death, Jeanne De Lestonnac, at the age of 46, and with her children now grown, turned to a contemplative life and entered the Cistercian Monastery in Toulouse where she was given the religious name of Jeanne of Saint Bernard. She found great peace and satisfaction in the monastic life, but, after six months, she became very ill and had to leave the monastery. She then went to live on her estate La Mothe Lusié to recover her health, and where she adopted the lifestyle of a secular dévote, performing many acts of charity, including food and alms distribution, and regularly met with young women of her social class to pray and discuss religious questions. She sought for models of Catholic women to be her guides and cultivated an interest in the lives of Scholastica, Clare of Assisi, Catherine of Siena and Teresa of Avila.

A few years later, in 1605, a plague broke out in Bordeaux. At risk to her own life, De Lestonnac returned to her native city to help care for the sick and suffering in the slums of the city.

=== Foundress ===
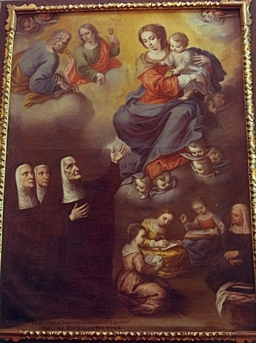
Jeanne de Lestonnac praying with her Sisters to Our Lady, in the Church of St. Bruno, Bordeaux, France (17th century)

Lestonnac's brother, a Jesuit attached to the college in Bordeaux, arranged a meeting between Lestonnac and two Jesuit fathers: Jean de Bordes and François de Raymond. The Jesuits asked de Lestonnac to serve as founder of a new teaching order for young women. They encouraged her to establish for girls in terms of formal education what they were doing for boys. The three decided upon a cloistered community to follow the Benedictine rule, modified to allow sisters to teach. The group gained the approval of Pope Paul V in 1607. The community took the name of the Compagnie de Notre-Dame.

The group purchased an old priory near the Château Trompette, but moved in September 1610, to a larger old monastery on rue du Hâ. They were well-received and financially supported by the city's elite. The first five members of the new order took their religious vows on December 10, 1610. The community established its first school for girls in Bordeaux. Foundations proceeded in Beziers, Périgueux, and Toulouse through Lestonnac's personal connections as well as her connections with the Jesuits and Bordelaise political elites. By the time she died in 1640, at the age of 84, 30 houses existed in France.

== Legacy ==
De Lestonnac was beatified in 1900 by Pope Leo XIII and was canonized on May 15, 1949 by Pope Pius XII. As of 2016 her religious order has over 1,450 sisters found in 27 countries throughout Europe, Africa, North America and South America.
