= Simona Brambilla =

Italian religious sister (born 1965)

Reverend Sister Simona Brambilla MC
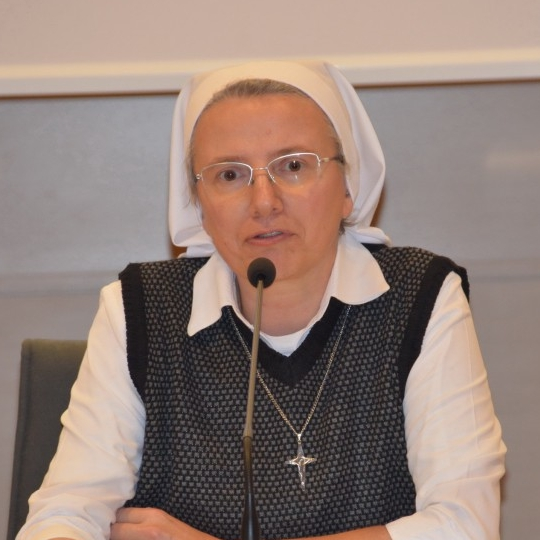
- Brambilla in 2019

Prefect of the Dicastery for Institutes of Consecrated Life and Societies of Apostolic Life
- Incumbent
- Assumed office 6 January 2025
- Appointed by: Pope Francis
- Preceded by: João Braz de Aviz

Secretary of the Dicastery for Institutes of Consecrated Life and Societies of Apostolic Life
- In office October 2023 – January 2025
- Appointed by: Pope Francis

Personal details
- Born: 27 March 1965 (age 61) Monza, Italy
- Education: Pontifical Gregorian University
- Occupation: Nun, missionary

Simona Brambilla MC (born 27 March 1965) is an Italian Catholic religious sister who serves as Prefect of the Dicastery for Institutes of Consecrated Life and Societies of Apostolic Life since 2025. She is a member of the Consolata Missionaries and is the first woman to head a department of the Roman Curia. Brambilla led the women's branch of the Consolata Missionaries from 2011 to 2023 and became the first female secretary of the Dicastery for Institutes of Consecrated Life in 2023.

== Early life ==
Brambilla was born in Monza, in Lombardy, on 27 March 1965. She obtained a diploma in nursing 1986, and worked at the L. Mandic Hospital in Merate (Province of Lecco). She entered the Institute of the Missionary Sisters of Consolata in 1988 and made her first religious profession in 1991. She received a licentiate in psychology from the Institute of Psychology of the Pontifical Gregorian University in 1998.

== Career ==
Beginning in 1999, after making her final profession, Brambilla was responsible for youth ministry at the Macua Xirima Study Center in Maua, Mozambique. She taught from 2002 to 2006 at the Gregorian's Institute of Psychology and earned a doctorate in psychology there in 2008, with a thesis on evangelization and inculturation in Mozambique. She served as general councilor for the Consolata Missionaries from 2005 to 2011. Brambilla was elected to a six-year term as superior general of the women's branch of the Consolata Missionaries on 7 June 2011, and elected to a second term in 2017, which concluded in May 2023. In July 2023, Pope Francis chose Brambilla to participate in the Synod on Synodality.

On 8 July 2019, Pope Francis named her and six others as the first women members of the Dicastery for Institutes of Consecrated Life and Societies of Apostolic Life. On 7 October 2023, Pope Francis appointed her the first female secretary of that Dicastery. She is the second woman to hold this rank in a dicastery of the Roman Curia after Alessandra Smerilli at the Dicastery for Promoting Integral Human Development, while two other women hold the same title at other departments (not dicasteries): Nathalie Becquart at the Synod of Bishops and Raffaella Petrini at the Governorate of Vatican City State.

On December 13, 2024, Pope Francis named her and María Lía Zervino along with two cardinals as his appointees to the 16th Ordinary Council of the General Secretariat of the Synod. Brambilla and Zervino were the first women appointed to that role. On 6 January 2025, Pope Francis named her Prefect of the Dicastery for Institutes of Consecrated Life and Societies of Apostolic Life. With this appointment, she became the first woman to head a department of the Roman Curia. Her term was suspended automatically with the death of Pope Francis, but was renewed provisionally by Pope Leo XIV.

== Selected writings ==
- "Ferro e Fuoco". Consolata Missionaries. 10 June 2022. Insights from the experience of a women's missionary congregation in dialogue with Teresa of Lisieux

Catholic Church titles
Preceded by João Braz de Aviz	Prefect of the Congregation for Institutes of Consecrated Life and Societies of Apostolic Life; 6 January 2025 – present	Incumbent
