= Luigi Lavitrano =

Italian cardinal

His Eminence Luigi Lavitrano
- Prefect of the Congregation for Religious
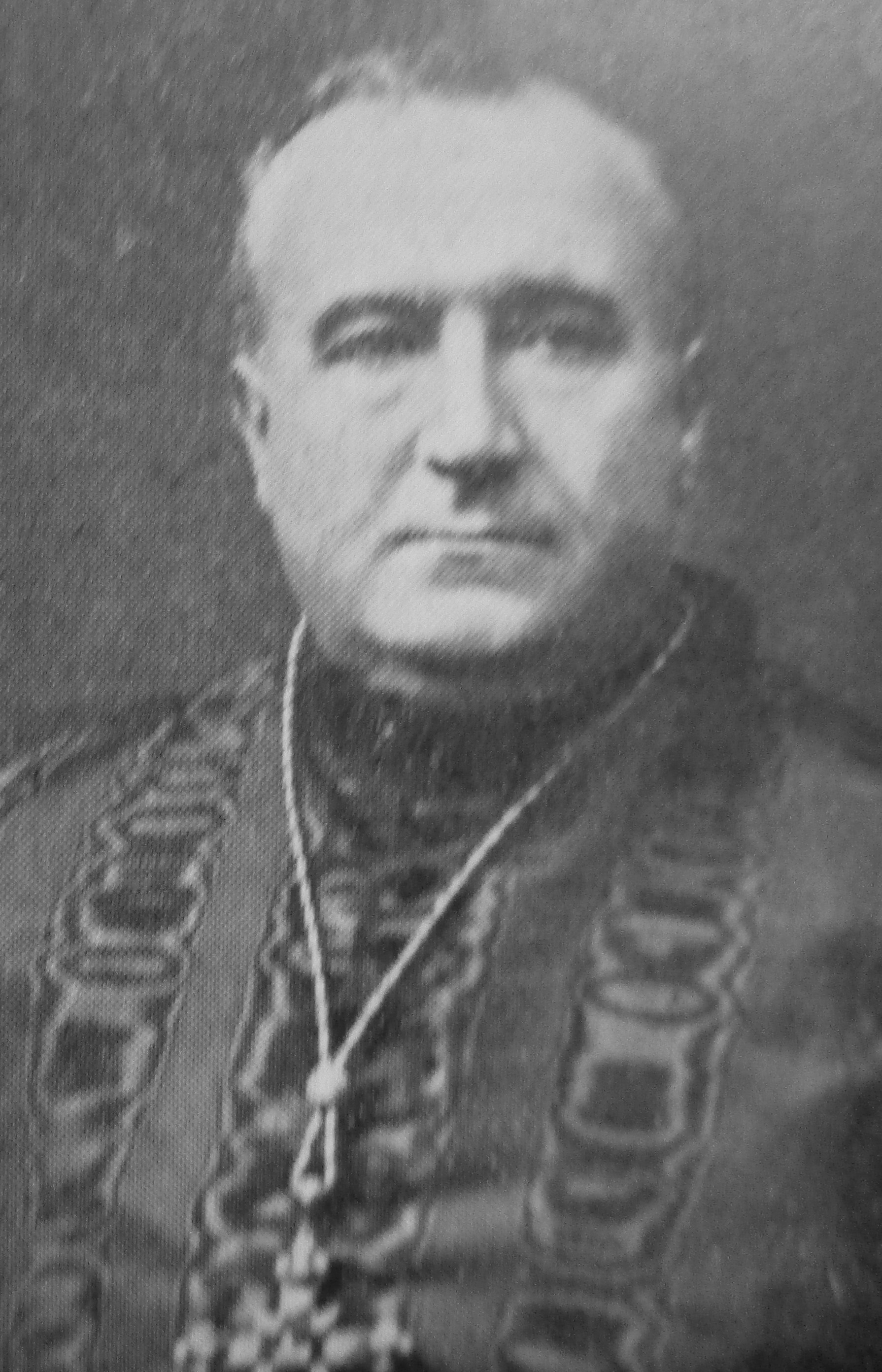
- Cardinal Lavitrano in 1939.
- Appointed: 14 May 1945
- Term ended: 2 August 1950
- Predecessor: Vincenzo Lapuma
- Successor: Clemente Micara
- Other post: Cardinal-Priest of San Silvestro in Capite (1929–50)
- Previous posts: Bishop of Cava (1914–24); Bishop of Sarno (1914–24); Archbishop of Benevento (1924–28); Archbishop of Palermo (1928–44); Apostolic Administrator of Piana degli Albanesi (1937–46)

Orders
- Ordination: 21 March 1898 by Francesco Satolli
- Consecration: 21 June 1914 by Basilio Pompili
- Created cardinal: 16 December 1929 by Pope Pius XI
- Rank: Cardinal-Priest

Personal details
- Born: Luigi Lavitrano; 7 March 1874 Forio, Kingdom of Italy
- Died: 2 August 1950 (aged 76) Castel Gandolfo, Rome, Italy
- Education: Pontifical Urbaniana University; Pontifical Roman Athenaeum S. Apollinare; Sapienza University of Rome
- Motto: Per crucem ad astra

Styles of Luigi Lavitrano
- Reference style: His Eminence
- Spoken style: Your Eminence
- Informal style: Cardinal
- See: Palermo (emeritus)

Luigi Lavitrano (7 March 1874 – 2 August 1950) was an Italian cardinal of the Catholic Church who served as Archbishop of Palermo from 1928 to 1944, and as prefect of the Sacred Congregation for Religious from 1945 until his death. Lavitrano was elevated to the cardinalate in 1929.

== Biography ==
Born in Forio, Lavitrano lost his entire family in an earthquake in 1883 that devastated the island of Ischia. He studied at the Pontifical Urbaniana University, the Pontifical Roman Athenaeum Saint Apollinare, the Royal University, and the Pontifical Leonine Institute in Rome. He was ordained to the priesthood on 21 March 1898, and then taught at the Leonine Institute until 1910, when he became its rector. He was raised to the rank of Privy Chamberlain of His Holiness on 8 March 1904.

On 25 May 1914, Lavitrano was appointed Bishop of Cava e Sarno by Pope Pius X. He received his episcopal consecration on the following 21 June from Basilio Cardinal Pompili, with Bishops Giovanni Regine and Giovanni Scotti serving as co-consecrators. Lavitrano was later named Archbishop of Benevento on 16 July 1924, and finally archbishop of Palermo on 29 September 1928. In addition, he served as Apostolic Administrator of Castellammare di Stabia from 1924 to 1925.

Pope Pius XI created him Cardinal-Priest of San Silvestro in Capite in the consistory of 16 December 1929. Lavitrano, who once scolded Italian Catholics for their religious negligence, was one of the cardinal electors who participated in the 1939 papal conclave that selected Pope Pius XII. After resigning as Palermo's archbishop in December 1944, he was made Prefect of the Sacred Congregation for Religious in the Roman Curia on 14 May 1945. Lavitrano's resignation was unexpected, and it is considered that he resigned because his alleged sympathy for the Fascists—he voted for the National Fascist Party in the 1929 Italian general elections—became unpopular.

Lavitrano died in Marino, in the Alban Hills, at age 76. He is buried in the basilica of Santa Maria di Loreto in his native Forio.

Catholic Church titles
Preceded by Giuseppe Izzo	Bishop of Cava e Sarno; 1914–1924	Succeeded by Pasquale Dell'Isola
Preceded by Alessio Ascalesi, CPPS	Archbishop of Benevento; 1924–1928	Succeeded by Adeodato Giovanni Piazza
Preceded by Alessandro Lualdi	Archbishop of Palermo; 29 September 1928 – 14 May 1945	Succeeded by Ernesto Ruffini
Preceded by Donato Cardinal Sbarretti	Cardinal-Priest of S. Silvestro in Capite; 1929–1950	Succeeded by Valerio Cardinal Valeri
Preceded by Vincenzo Lapuma	Prefect of the Sacred Congregation for Religious; 1945–1950	Succeeded by Clemente Micara
