= María Lía Zervino =

Argentine consecrated virgin and sociologist (born 1951)

María Lía Zervino (born 1951) is an Argentine consecrated virgin and a sociologist. Being a member of the Asociación de Vírgenes Consagradas Servidoras ("Association of Consecrated Virgin Servants") she served as President General of the World Union of Catholic Women's Organisations from 2018 to 2023, an Association of the Christian faithful which was erected by the Holy See in 2006.

== Life ==
Zervino was born in 1951 in Buenos Aires, Argentina. María Lía Zervino studied at the Pontificia Universidad Católica Argentina where she received her PhD in sociology. In the Argentinian Diocese of Mar del Plata she was head of the National Commission for Justice and Peace of the Argentine Bishops' Conference. She is also a consultant to the Pontifical Council for Interreligious Dialogue and teaches at the Argentine Theological Faculty in Buenos Aires. In 2019, she was elected to the World Council of Religions for Peace.

In March 2021, she wrote an open letter to Pope Francis in which she – besides thanking him for his statements in Laudato si', Amoris laetitia and Fratelli tutti – expressed her concern that "not enough progress has been made in taking advantage of the wealth of women who make up a large part of the People of God". Zervino also wrote about her "dream of a Church that has suitable women as judges in all the courts in which matrimonial cases are processed, in the formation teams of each seminary and for exercising ministries such as listening, spiritual direction, pastoral health care, care for the planet, defence of human rights, etc., for which, by our nature, women are equally or sometimes better prepared than men."

On 13 July 2022, Pope Francis elected her as a member of the Vatican's Dicastery for Bishops. Alongside with two religious sisters, Raffaella Petrini and Yvonne Reungoat, Zervino belongs to the first three women to be elected as members of the dicastery, which is responsible for identifying new, future bishops. On December 13, 2024, Pope Francis appointed her a member of the XVI Ordinary Council of the General Secretariat of the Synod, making her one of four members he appointed and, along with Sr. Simona Brambilla, one of the first two women appointed to that role.
