= Carmen Ros Nortes =

Spanish nun and Roman Curia official (born 1953)

Carmen Ros Nortes, NSC (born 20 November 1953) is a Spanish religious sister and missionary, who serves as Undersecretary of the Dicastery for Institutes of Consecrated Life and Societies of Apostolic Life since 2018.

== Early life ==
Ros was born on 20 December 1953 in the Espinardo neighborhood of Murcia, Spain. She joined the Sisters of Our Lady of Consolation and made her perpetual vows on 19 January 1986. The Sisters of Our Lady of Consolation are an order based in Spain who aim to console, and work with the most disadvantaged.

In Spain, she qualified in Human Sciences and Catechetical Pedagogy and got a degree in Theology specializing in Mariology from the Pontifical Theological Faculty "Marianum" (Rome) in 1985.

== Career ==
She has served in various offices within her Order and worked as a missionary in South Korea.

On 1 January 1992, she joined the staff of the Congregation for Institutes of Consecrated Life and Societies of Apostolic Life and worked in several of its departments, including as a teacher in its Studium, its school of theology and law for consecrated life.

She was the Congregation's special envoy to the seventh Latin American and Caribbean Encounter for Consecrated Life in Quito, Ecuador, in 2014.

On 23 February 2018, Pope Francis appointed her as Undersecretary of the Dicastery for Institutes of Consecrated Life and Societies of Apostolic Life. She has been described as one of the highest ranking female officials in the Vatican. As undersecretary of the Congregation for Institutes of Consecrated Life and Societies of Apostolic Life her name is on some orders from the Vatican when they need to intervene in religious orders.
