= Françoise Massy =

Personal life
- Born: 2 March 1947 (age 79)

Religious life
- Institute: Franciscan Missionaries of Mary
- Church: Roman Catholic Church

Senior posting
- Post: Superior General
- Period in office: 2014–2020
- Successor: Eufemia Glenny
- Awards: Chevalier of the Legion of Honour

Françoise Massy, F.M.M (born 2 March 1947) is a French Roman Catholic Religious Sister and missionary, one of the seven first women appointed members of the Congregation for Institutes of Consecrated Life and Societies of Apostolic Life the second highest-ranking department of the Roman Curia, the administrative institution of the Holy See since 8 July 2019, when was appointed by Pope Francis.

Massy was elected on 1 October 2014 as the Superior General of her religious congregation, the Franciscan Missionaries of Mary. She was succeeded in 2020 by Eufemia Glenny, F.M.M.

In 2021 she was awarded the Legion of Honor for her contribution towards society. Yvonne Reungoat who was also a Sister was also given the award which they both received on New Years Day.
