= Alexis Lépicier =

French Roman Catholic cardinal

His Eminence Alexis-Henri-Marie Lépicier O.S.M.
- Prefect Emeritus of the Congregation for Religious
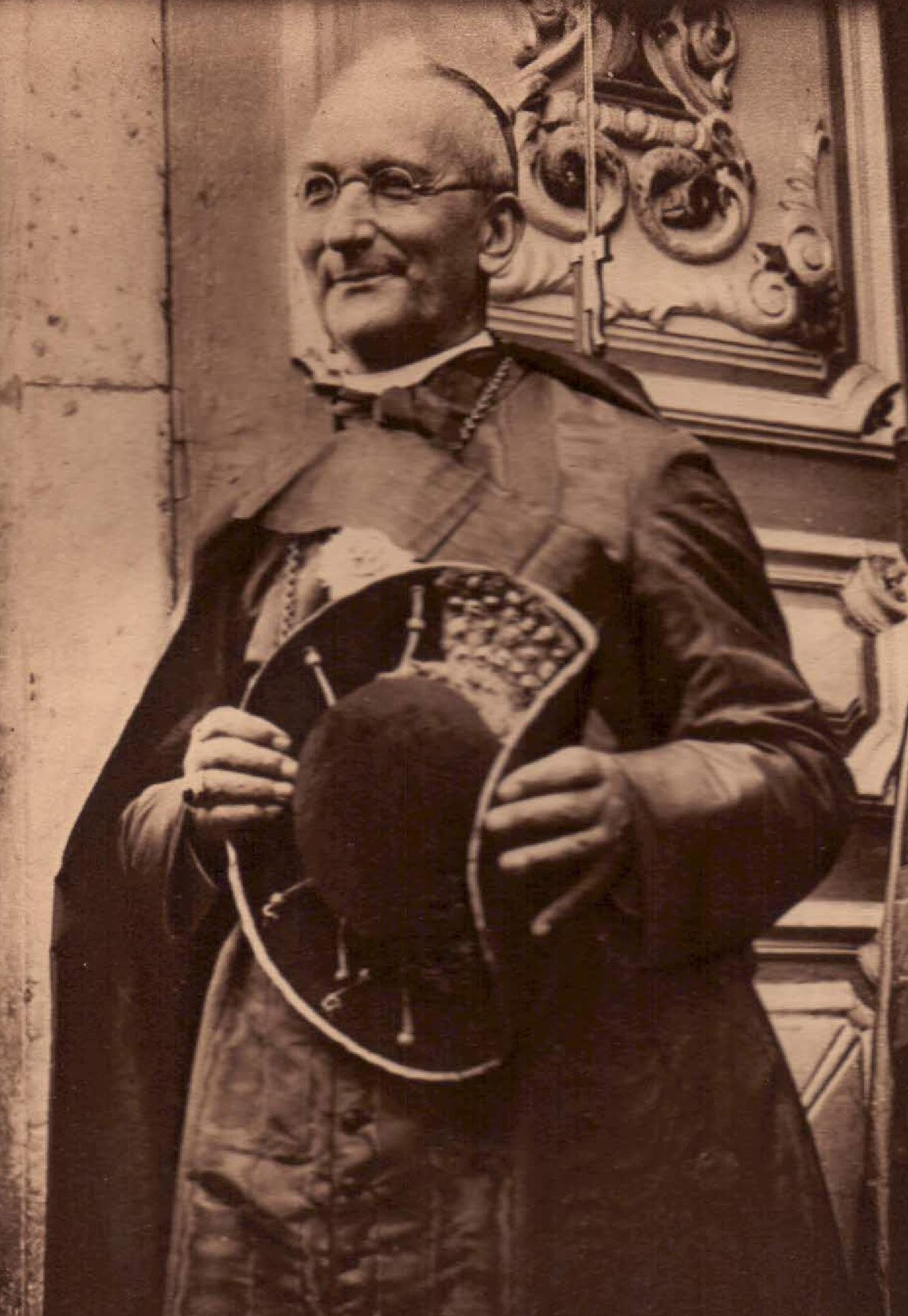
- The cardinal pictured in Tunisia in 1930.
- Church: Roman Catholic Church
- Appointed: 17 December 1928
- Term ended: 31 December 1935
- Predecessor: Camillo Laurenti
- Successor: Vincenzo Lapuma
- Other post(s): Cardinal-Priest of Santa Susanna (1927–36)
- Previous post(s): Prior General of the Servites (1913–20); Titular Archbishop of Tarsus (1924–27)

Orders
- Ordination: 19 September 1885 by William Weathers
- Consecration: 29 May 1924 by Wilhelmus Marinus van Rossum
- Created cardinal: 19 December 1927 by Pope Pius XI
- Rank: Cardinal-Priest

Personal details
- Born: Alexis-Henri-Marie Lépicier; 28 February 1863; Vaucouleurs, Second French Empire
- Died: 20 May 1936 (aged 73); Rome, Kingdom of Italy
- Buried: Campo Verano
- Parents: François-Henri Lépicier; Marie-Claire Hette
- Motto: Tuam voluntatem doce me facere
- Coat of arms

Styles of Alexis Lépicier
- Reference style: His Eminence
- Spoken style: Your Eminence
- Informal style: Cardinal
- See: Tarsus (titular see)

Alexis-Henri-Marie Lépicier O.S.M. (28 February 1863, Vaucouleurs, Meuse – 20 May 1936) was a Cardinal of the Roman Catholic Church who was Prefect of the Sacred Congregation for Religious. This position gave him authority over the Institute of consecrated life within the Catholic Church.

Lépicier was born in Vaucouleurs, France. He joined the Order of Servants of Mary on 1 March 1878 in London. He later attended the Seminary of Saint-Sulpice, Paris and the Pontificio Collegio Urbano de Propaganda Fide in Rome. He was then ordained to the priesthood on 19 September 1885 in London. He served as Master of Novices from 1890 until 1892 and was a faculty member of the Pontificio Collegio Urbano de Propaganda Fide from 1892 until 1913. He served as Rector of the Servite College, Rome from 1895 until 1913 and was General Procurator of his order in 1901. He was appointed Apostolic visitor and delegate to Scotland by Pope Pius X and was in Scotland in 1912–1913.

== Episcopate ==
He was appointed titular Archbishop of Tarsus on 22 May 1924. He was appointed as Apostolic Visitor to the East Indies dioceses dependent on the Congregation for the Propagation of Faith on 11 June 1924, as well as serving as Apostolic Visitor to Abyssinia and Eritrea in 1927.

== Cardinal ==
He was created and proclaimed Cardinal-Priest of Santa Susanna in the consistory of 19 December 1927 by Pope Pius XI. He was then appointed as Prefect of the Sacred Congregation for Religious in 1928. He resigned the prefecture on the last day of 1935. He died in 1936.

Preceded by Camillo Laurenti	Prefect of the Sacred Congregation for Religious; 17 December 1928 – 31 December 1935	Succeeded by Vincenzo Lapuma
