= Lex Manciana =

Roman law dealing with tenancy agreements of imperial estates in Roman North Africa

The Lex Manciana is a Roman law dealing with tenancy agreements of imperial estates in Roman North Africa.

== Location ==
The original text of the Lex is not known, but there are seven inscriptions in the north of Africa which contain agreements and contracts between land owners and land users that were formulated after the example of the Lex Mancia.

Some of the Imperial estates in question are from the Bagradas Valley region of Africa Proconsularis (modern day Tunisia, around c.50 km west of the ancient city of Carthage. The inscription from Henchir-Mettich (c. AD 116-117) consists in an adaptation of the Lex Manciana for the fundus Villa Magna Variana. Several additional inscriptions dealing with a similar subject matter, also in the same region, are known, for example from Ain-el Djemala (Hadrianic period) and from Ain Wassel c. AD 198-209).

== Inscription ==
The inscription from Henchir Mettich details the tenancy agreement for coloni tenant farmers on the Fundus Villae Magnae Variane (an Imperial estate). The content of the translation runs as follows:

1. Preamble – Identifies Licinius Maximus (an Equite) and Felicior (a freedman of Trajan) as the procurators who oversaw the establishment at Henchir-Mettich.

2. Authorisation to cultivate subseciva – Allows unused land (subseciva) on this Imperial estate to be brought under cultivation under the following agreement.

3. Assessment of share rents – Tenants will pay rents in kind (i.e., part of the total crop) according to their own judgement.

4. Rents of subseciva – Rents are one third total crop of wheat, barley, wine and olive oil. Additional rents include one quarter or one fifth of beans and of honey if over five hives are owned.

5. Penalties – Beehives cannot be moved from the estate onto free land in order to avoid rent.

6. Incentives – No rents are charged on newly planted vines and figs for the first five years, and newly planted olive trees for the first ten years.

7. Grazing – An annual fee of 4 asses is payable per animal grazing on the land.

8. Damage – Avoidable damage to other tenants' crops is paid for by the offender.

9. Bequesting – Land under tenancy can be bequeathed to an heir in a legally binding contract. This clause intends to promote generational farming of the same land and thus further investment.

10. Confiscation – Land neglected and uncultivated for two consecutive years will be reclaimed by the landlord.

11. Labour Services – In addition to rents, each tenant must supply two consecutive days labour for ploughing and two for harvesting, on top of a day supervising the livestock. Labour services could be seconded to slaves or retainers of the tenants.

== Sharecropping ==
Subsistence farming for a family of six in the ancient world requires three hectares of land to provide crops and enough seed for the next year, though to include a one third payment to a landlord requires cultivation of at least five hectares of land.

Sharecropping forces the colonii to cultivate their land with more effort to attain a minimum level of income than they would otherwise have to supply. It also allows the farmer to pass some of the risks involved in farming onto the landlord as a poor crop would mean lower rents.

== See also ==
- Roman agriculture
- Roman Law
