= Sisters of the Company of Mary, Our Lady =

The Company of Mary, Our Lady
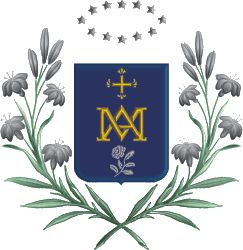
- Abbreviation: O.D.N
- Formation: 7 April 1607; 419 years ago
- Type: Roman Catholic religious order
- Location: Rome, Italy
- Superior General: Rita Calvo Sanz
- Key people: Jeanne de Lestonnac, foundress
- Website: Orden de la Compañía de María

The Sisters of the Company of Mary, Our Lady are the members of a Roman Catholic religious order founded by Jeanne de Lestonnac (1556-1640) in France in 1607. The Order's mission is education, focused on the person in all their uniqueness. The members of the Order use the initials O.D.N. (Latin: Ordinis Dominae Nostrae) after their names.

== History ==
=== Founding ===
De Lestonnac was born into a prominent family of Bordeaux in 1556. At the age of 17 she married and had eight children. She was widowed after 24 years of marriage. After a brief period as Cistercian nun, she envisioned the establishment of a new kind of religious community, whose essential task would availability to all those in need, most especially for the education of girls.

In 1605, during an outbreak of plague broke in Bordeaux, De Lestonnac helped care for the sick. A number of young women indicated a willingness to join her. During this period, she became acquainted with Ignatian spirituality through contact with several Jesuit priests. In 1607 the foundation gained the approval of Pope Paul V of a religious order dedicated to education, with the restrictions, however, of being organized along the Benedictine model, as an enclosed religious order of nuns, with each monastery to be independent. The community took the name of the Compagnie de Notre-Dame. They were the first female teaching congregation to gain official approval in France.

De Lestonnac and her followers received the religious habit of the new Order on 1 May 1608. The following year, the foundation received the approval of King Henry IV, allowing for expansion in the Kingdom of France. Five members of the new order completed their period of novitiate and took their religious vows on 10 December 1610, at which time the community established its first school for girls in Bordeaux.

Its houses tended to be located in towns served by Jesuit colleges. Houses were established in Béziers, Poitiers, and Lu Puy (1618), Périgueux (1620), Angen (1621), La Flèche and Riom (1622). By the time she died in 1640, at the age of 84, 30 monasteries of the Order existed in France.

Historically, they were also known as Les Filles de Notre-Dame and the Sisters of Notre-Dame of Bordeaux.

== Development ==
Ten years later, in 1650, the Sisters established a school in Barcelona, their first house outside France. During the 18th century, Order flourished in Spain and in its colonial domains in Latin America. The first school for women in the Americas was founded in Bogotá, Colombia. During the French Revolution the sisters in France were dispersed and some of them were put to death. A number of expatriate religious established new foundations in Belgium, the Netherlands, Italy, Mexico and California.

In 1892, the Sisters came to Penzance, soon discovered that, as a semi-enclosed order, they were not really suited to the work of teaching in a parish school. With the Bishop's blessing, they left for London in 1895.

== Renewal ==
In 1920, 63 of the 90 monasteries of the Order voted to drop the monastic life and to unite in a single religious congregation of active Religious Sisters, in keeping with the vision of their foundress. The Sisters then changed their name from the Order of Mary to the Company of Mary, to complement the Company of Jesus, as the Jesuits are called in the Spanish of their founder, Ignatius de Loyola. They received the approval of Pope Benedict XV for this change. The next year a General Motherhouse for the united houses of the company was established in Rome. After the changes in canon law governing religious institutes resulting from the Second Vatican Council, the various independent monasteries of the Order united with the company.

The celebration of the Feast of the Presentation of the Mary (21 November) is a particular tradition of the Company of Mary, Our Lady.

== Current status ==
Today the Company of Mary numbers about 1,500 members working in over 400 teaching institutions in 26 nations across the world. These range from nurseries to university colleges and hospitals. The Sisters of the Company see their work of education as involving the development of the whole person, possible in a range of settings. A large number of lay people, both women and men, have become a part of the work of Company in fulfilling its mission.
