= Congregation of Bishops and Regulars =

The Congregation of Bishops and Regulars (Latin: Congregatio episcoporum et regularium) was a department of the Roman Curia that, beginning in the late 16th century, managed the diocesan bishops and the individuals and establishments, both male and female, associated with religious orders. It was also concerned with the relationship, at times contentious, between the two.

The term "regulars" derives from the Latin regula meaning rule; it refers to those religious who follow a rule, as the Benedictines follow the Rule of St. Benedict.

== History ==
The Congregation's competence changed over time as the various dicasteries of the Roman Curia competed for jurisdiction, and by the 19th century included new institutions and their rules, the erection of monasteries and convents, granting transfers and leave from such institutions, and their sale of property. It also handled criminal cases. As late as 1903, this Congregation was described as "perhaps the most important congregation of the Roman Curia".

Pope Gregory XIII established a dicastery to address the issues raised by bishops (Congregatio super consultationibus episcoporum) in 1576, and his successor Pope Sixtus V erected a parallel structure for regulars in 1586 (Congregatio super consultationibus regularium). In 1593 Pope Clement VIII gave the two curial departments a common prefect. By 1601 they were known by the single name.

Pope Pius X suppressed the Congregation of Bishops and Regulars on 29 June 1908 by the apostolic constitution Sapienti consilio, which accomplished an overall reorganization of the Curia, modifying its structure and the competencies of its congregations, tribunals, and lesser offices.

Responsibilities regarding bishops and seminaries passed to the Sacred Consistorial Congregation (the current Dicastery for Bishops), while those concerning religious went to the refounded Congregation for Religious.

== Other related congregations ==
In addition to the Congregation for Bishops and Regulars, other congregations existed which exercised control over religious. One was the Congregation for the Discipline of Regulars (Congregatio super disciplina regularium), founded in 1649 by Pope Innocent X, reformed in 1695 by Pope Innocent XII and suppressed in 1906. Another was the Congregation on the State of Regular Orders (Congregatio de statu regularium ordinum), established by Pope Pius IX in 1846, and united with the former in 1856.

Alongside the Congregation of Bishops and Regulars, the Congregation for the Residence of Bishops (Congregatio super residentia episcoporum) was also important. Established by Pope Urban VIII in 1634, it was to ensure that bishops, in obedience to the precepts of the Council of Trent, actually resided in the dioceses of which they were titulars and to which prelates had to apply in order to obtain dispensations from these obligations. This congregation too was suppressed in 1908 following the reforms of Pius X.
