= Kathleen Appler =

American Roman Catholic nun and Roman Curia official (1952–2020)

- Born: 1952
- Died: 2020 (aged 67–68); Paris, France
- Occupation: Nun

Kathleen Mary Appler D.C (23 February 1952 – 18 March 2020) was an American Roman Catholic nun and member of the Daughters of Charity of Saint Vincent de Paul. She was one of the first seven women appointed members of the Congregation for Institutes of Consecrated Life and Societies of Apostolic Life. She was appointed on 8 July 2019 by Pope Francis.

Kathleen Appler was from Utica, New York and joined the Daughters of Charity in April 1973 in Boston, Massachusetts. She worked in schools for many years and became Sister Servant of St John's Parish Centre in Brooklyn. She spent 47 years as a nun, and in 2009 she was elected as General Counsellor.

She attended Utica Catholic Academy in 1970 and subsequently earned a number of academic degrees including a Bachelor of Liberal Arts (1975), a BA in English Literature with a Major in Primary Education (1978) and a Master’s degree in Elementary Education (1984).

From 25 May 2015 until her death on 18 March 2020, she was the Superioress General of the Daughters of Charity of Saint Vincent de Paul and since 2009 was member of its General Assembly. She was the first American to hold this position, and the second who was not French.

She was appointed to the Congregation for Institutes of Consecrated Life and Societies of Apostolic Life, one of the first seven women appointed, by Pope Francis in 2019. When she was appointed she was quoted as saying "I believe that this is a unique moment in our Church’s history, offering a concrete expression of the sacred trust and confidence that Pope Francis has in women religious".

Sister Kathleen Appler died in Paris on 18 March 2020, from cancer after a long illness. Her successor was Françoise Petit, who was elected the new Superior General of the Daughters of Charity on 20 April 2020.
