= Giuseppe Bertello =

Italian prelate (born 1942)

His Eminence Giuseppe Bertello
- President Emeritus of the Governorate of Vatican City State
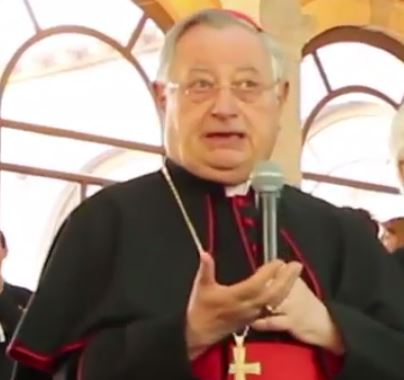
- Bertello in 2016
- Appointed: 1 October 2011
- Term ended: 1 October 2021
- Predecessor: Giovanni Lajolo
- Successor: Fernando Vérgez Alzaga
- Other posts: President of the Pontifical Commission for Vatican City State; Member of the Council of Cardinal Advisers (2013–); Cardinal priest of Santi Vito, Modesto e Crescenzia (2022–)
- Previous posts: Apostolic Pro-Nuncio to Benin (1987–1990); Apostolic Pro-Nuncio to Ghana (1987–1990); Apostolic Pro-Nuncio to Togo (1987–1990); Apostolic Nuncio to Rwanda (1990–1995); Apostolic Nuncio to the United Nations in Geneva (1995–2000); Apostolic Nuncio to Mexico (2000–2006); Apostolic Nuncio to Italy (2006–2011); Apostolic Nuncio to San Marino (2006–2011)

Orders
- Ordination: 29 June 1966 by Albino Mensa
- Consecration: 28 November 1987 by Agostino Casaroli
- Created cardinal: 18 February 2012 by Benedict XVI
- Rank: Cardinal deacon (2012–22); Cardinal priest (2022–present)

Personal details
- Born: 1 October 1942 (age 84) Foglizzo, Piedmont, Kingdom of Italy
- Denomination: Roman Catholicism
- Education: Pontifical Ecclesiastical Academy
- Motto: Narrabo nomen tuum (I will tell your name to my brothers.)
- Coat of arms: Giuseppe Bertello's coat of arms

Styles of Giuseppe Bertello
- Reference style: His Eminence
- Spoken style: Your Eminence
- Religious style: Cardinal
- Informal style: Cardinal

Ordination history of Giuseppe Bertello
History
Priestly ordination
- Ordained by: Bishop Albino Mensa
Episcopal consecration
- Consecrated by: Agostino Casaroli
Cardinalate
- Elevated by: Pope Benedict XVI
Episcopal succession
Bishops consecrated by Giuseppe Bertello as principal consecrator
- José Luis Castro Medellín, M.S.F.: 3 December 2002
- Eduardo Cirilo Carmona Ortega, C.O.R.C.: 7 January 2004
- Pedro Pablo Elizondo Cárdenas, L.C.: 22 November 2004
- Maximino Martínez Miranda: 2006
- Konrad Krajewski: 17 September 2013

Giuseppe Bertello (born 1 October 1942) is an Italian prelate of the Catholic Church, a cardinal since 2012, who was President of the Pontifical Commission for Vatican City State and President of the Governorate of Vatican City State from October 2011 to October 2021. He worked in the diplomatic service of the Holy See from 1971 to 2011; became an archbishop in 1987; held appointments as Nuncio to several countries, including Rwanda, Mexico, and Italy; and was the Holy See's representative to a number of international organizations.

== Early life ==
Bertello was ordained a priest on 29 June 1966 by Bishop Albino Mensa. He earned a licence in pastoral theology and a doctorate in canon law. He went on to attend the Pontifical Ecclesiastical Academy where he studied diplomacy.

== Diplomatic service ==
He entered the diplomatic service of the Holy See in 1971, and worked until 1973 in the nunciature to the Sudan, which was also the apostolic delegation for the Red Sea region. From 1973 to 1976, he was secretary at the nunciature to Turkey, becoming a Chaplain of His Holiness on 9 February 1976. He was secretary in the nunciature to Venezuela from 1976 to 1981, and served with the rank of auditor in the Office of the Organization of the United Nations in Geneva from 1981 to 1987. In 1987, he headed the delegation of observers of the Holy See to the Conference of Foreign Ministers of the Movement of Non-Aligned Countries in Pyongyang, North Korea, where he was the first Catholic priest to visit the small Catholic community of that country, isolated since the Korean War.

On 17 October 1987, Pope John Paul II named him Titular Archbishop of Urbs Salvia and appointed him Apostolic Nuncio to Ghana, Togo and Benin. He was consecrated on 28 November by Cardinal Agostino Casaroli, with Bishops Albino Mensa and Luigi Bettazzi as the principal co-consecrators. On 12 January 1990, he was transferred to Rwanda, where he supported human rights organizations and encouraged Catholic bishops to unite as forceful advocates for ending civil war. He remained at his post and traveled into dangerous regions to bear witness to the Tutsi Genocide in 1994. In March 1995, John Paul II appointed him Permanent Observer of the Holy See to the United Nations in Geneva from 1997, with the same role at the World Trade Organization. Upon his appointment, Bertello negotiated the status of the Holy See as permanent observer in the World Trade Organization, becoming its first representative that year.

On 27 December 2000, John Paul named him Apostolic Nuncio to Mexico. On 30 July 2002, he received the Pope arriving on an apostolic visit in the country for the canonisation of Juan Diego Cuauhtlatoatzin. On 11 January 2006, Bertello was appointed Apostolic Nuncio to Italy and the Republic of San Marino by Pope Benedict XVI.

In 2007, Bertello was awarded the Grand Cross of the Mexican Order of the Aztec Eagle and on 4 October 2008, he was awarded the Knight Grand Cross of the Order of Merit of the Italian Republic.

== Curial work ==
On 3 September 2011, Pope Benedict XVI appointed Bertello President of the Pontifical Commission for Vatican City State and President of the Governorate of Vatican City State, effective 1 October 2011, his 69th birthday. On 6 January 2012, Pope Benedict announced that Bertello would be made a cardinal. He was created Cardinal-Deacon of Santi Vito, Modesto e Crescenzia on 18 February. On 21 April, Benedict appointed him to a five-year term as a member of the Congregation for the Evangelization of Peoples, the Congregation for Bishops, and the Pontifical Council for Justice and Peace.

He was one of the cardinal electors who participated in the 2013 papal conclave that elected Pope Francis.

On 13 April 2013, he was appointed to the Council of Cardinal Advisers established by Francis to advise him in devising a plan for restructuring the Roman Curia. Francis made him a member of the Administration of the Patrimony of the Apostolic See on 10 November 2014 and a member of the Congregation for the Causes of Saints on 3 December 2016. Francis also renewed his appointment at the Pontifical Commission for Vatican City State to 2021.

On 15 October 2020, Pope Francis renewed his term on the Council of Cardinal Advisers.

On 8 September 2021, Pope Francis appointed Bishop Fernando Vérgez Alzaga to succeed Bertello as President of the Pontifical Commission for Vatican City State and President of the Governorate of Vatican City State, effective 1 October 2021.

On 4 March 2022, he was elevated to the rank of cardinal priest.

Catholic Church titles
Preceded by José Roberto López Londoño	— TITULAR — Archbishop of Urbs Salvia pro hac vice 1987–2012	Succeeded by Georg Gänswein
Preceded by Umberto Betti	Cardinal-Deacon of Santi Vito, Modesto e Crescenzia; 2012–present	Incumbent
Diplomatic posts
Preceded by Giovanni Battista Morandini	Apostolic Nuncio to Rwanda; 1990–1995	Succeeded by Juliusz Janusz
Preceded by Paul Fouad Tabet	Apostolic Nuncio to the United Nations in Geneva; 1995–2000	Succeeded by Diarmuid Martin
Preceded by Leonardo Sandri	Apostolic Nuncio to Mexico; 2000–2006	Succeeded by Christophe Pierre
Preceded by Paolo Romeo	Apostolic Nuncio to Italy; 2006–2011	Succeeded by Adriano Bernardini
Preceded by Paolo Romeo	Apostolic Nuncio to San Marino; 2006–2011	Succeeded by Adriano Bernardini
Political offices
Preceded by Giovanni Lajolo	President of the Governorate of the Vatican; 2011–2021	Succeeded by Fernando Vérgez Alzaga
Preceded by Giovanni Lajolo	President of the Pontifical Commission of the Vatican; 2011–2021	Succeeded by Fernando Vérgez Alzaga
