= Dicastery for Bishops =

Department of the Roman Curia

- Dicasterium pro Episcopis
- Coat of arms of the Holy See

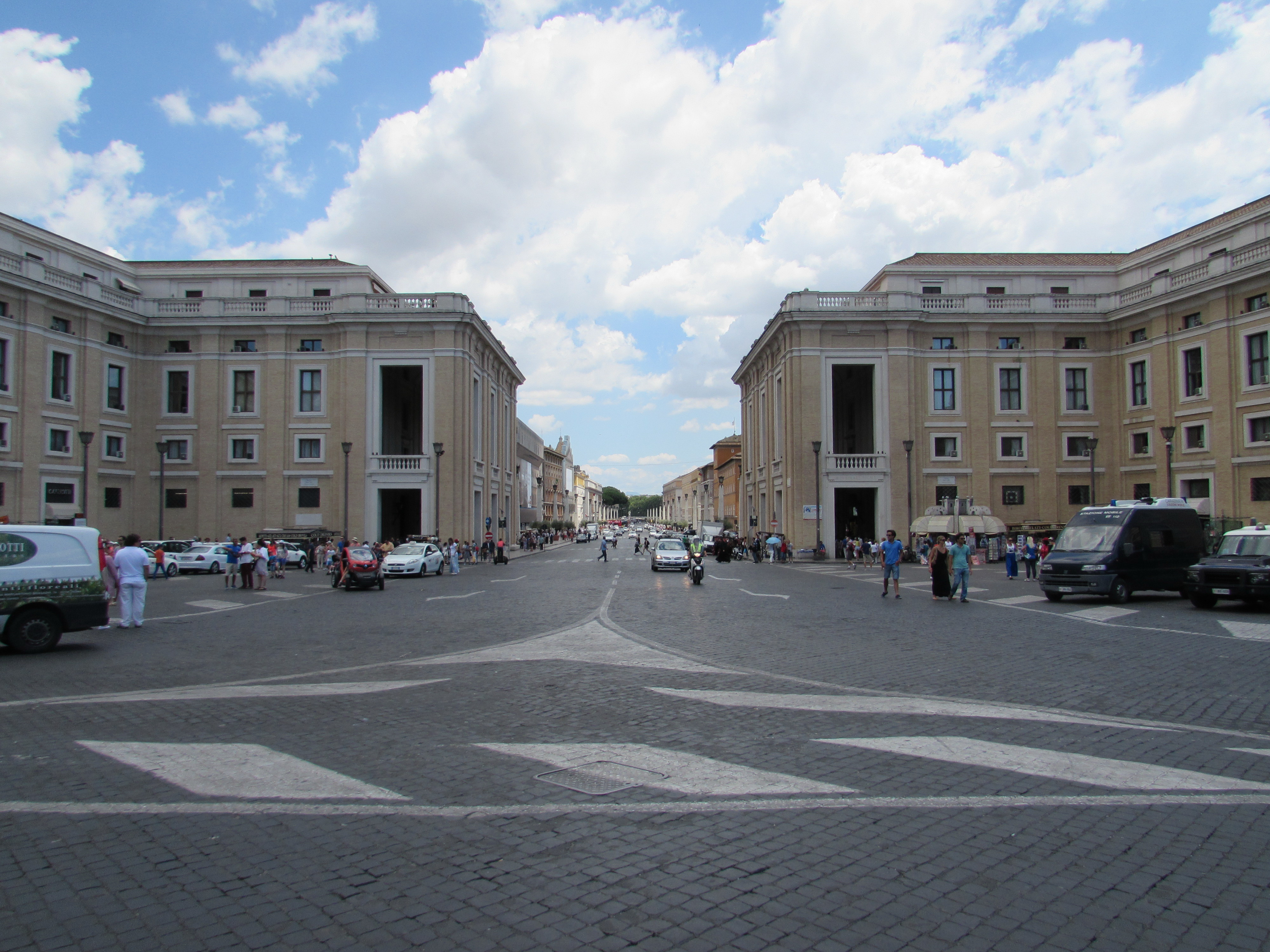
- Palazzo delle Congregazioni in Piazza Pio XII (in front of St. Peter's Square) is the workplace for most congregations of the Roman Curia

Dicastery overview
- Formed: January 22, 1588; 438 years ago
- Preceding agencies: Congregation for the Erection of Churches and Consistorial Provisions; Congregation for Bishops
- Type: Dicastery
- Headquarters: Palazzo delle Congregazioni, Piazza Pio XII, Rome, Italy
- Dicastery executives: Filippo Iannone, Prefect; Ilson de Jesus Montanari, Secretary
- Website: www.congregazionevescovi.va

The Dicastery for Bishops, formerly named Congregation for Bishops (Latin: Congregatio pro Episcopis), is the dicastery of the Roman Curia of the Catholic Church that oversees the selection of most new bishops. Its proposals require papal approval to take effect, but are usually followed. The Dicastery also schedules the visits at five-year intervals ("ad limina") that bishops are required to make to Rome, when they meet with the pope and various departments of the Curia. It also manages the formation of new dioceses. It is one of the more influential Dicasteries, since it strongly influences the human resources policy of the church.

The jurisdiction of the Dicastery does not extend to mission territories, under the Dicastery for Evangelization, or areas managed by the Dicastery for the Eastern Churches (which has responsibility for all Eastern Catholics, and for Latin Catholics in the Middle East and Greece). Where appointment of bishops and changes in diocesan boundaries require consultation with civil governments, the Secretariat of State has primary responsibility, but must consult the Dicastery for Bishops. The Dicastery also have oversight of investigations into allegations of abuse and negligence by bishops.

The Dicastery for Bishops has jurisdiction over the Pontifical Commission for Latin America, and the dicastery's prefect also serves as the commission's president.

== History ==
The Dicastery for Bishops has its origins in the "Congregation for the Erection of Churches and Consistorial Provisions", commonly known as "Concistorial Congregation", founded by Pope Sixtus V on 22 January 1588. Before the Second Vatican Council, when the pope announced the names of new cardinals at a Secret Consistory, that is, a consistory that only churchmen attended, the names of new cardinals would be read out, followed by those of archbishops and bishops.

The congregation of Bishops and Regulars was suppressed by Pope Pius X with the apostolic constitution Sapienti Consilio of 29 June 1908 and responsibilities regarding bishops and seminaries passed to the Consistorial Congregation (while those concerning religious went to the new Congregation for Religious). Alongside the Congregation of Bishops and Regulars, the Congregation for the Residence of Bishops (Congregatio super residentia episcoporum) was also important. Established by Pope Urban VIII in 1634, it was to ensure that bishops, in obedience to the precepts of the Council of Trent, actually resided in the dioceses of which they were titulars and to which prelates had to apply in order to obtain dispensations from these obligations. This congregation too was suppressed in 1908 following the reforms of Pius X.

The name was changed from the Sacred Consistorial Congregation to the Congregation for Bishops in 1967.

On 13 July 2022, Pope Francis appointed women as members of this Dicastery for the first time, two religious and one laywoman (Raffaella Petrini, Yvonne Reungoat, and María Lía Zervino). In addition, Pope Leo XIV appointed Sr. Simona Brambilla, M.C., prefect of the Dicastery for the Institutes of Consecrated Life and the Societies of Apostolic Life, as member of the Dicastery for Bishops on 14 February 2026.

=== Current procedure ===
The Dicastery's members who live in Rome meet every other Thursday for an entire morning. Appointments for four dioceses are reviewed in a typical session. Before the meeting, dicastery members are sent documentation on the candidates for each diocese. At the meeting, one member takes the role of the presenter (ponente), reviews the information and makes his own recommendation from the list (terna) of three candidates. Each member, in order of seniority, offers his assessment. The Dicastery's recommendations, including any doubts, questions or minority opinions, are sent to the pope. He usually approves the dicastery's decision, but may choose to send it back for further discussion and evaluation. The prefect then meets with the pope every Saturday and presents the recommendations of the dicastery. A few days later, the pope informs the dicastery of his decision. The dicastery then notifies the nuncio, who in turn contacts the candidate and asks if he will accept the appointment.

=== Course of Formation for New Bishops ===
Every September the Dicastery holds the "Annual Course of Formation for New Bishops", also known as "New Bishop School" and informally "Baby Bishop School". Attendance is mandatory for those ordained in the previous year. Topics are spiritual and practical, from imitating the leadership of Jesus to handling crises. There was a particular focus on "synodality", which was defined as listening and engaging the faithful. The event also involves meeting the pope.

There are talks such as on the new media in relation to evangelisation; and the rapport between psychological development and spiritual commitment. There were also talks on administration, canon law, and the reform of the Roman Curia.

== Leadership ==
Prefect of Dicastery for Bishops
- Incumbent; Filippo Iannone since 26 September 2025
- Dicastery for Bishops
- Style: His Excellency
- Member of: Roman Curia
- Reports to: The Pope
- Appointer: The Pope
- Term length: Five years, renewable
- Constituting instrument: Immense; Pastor Bonus
- Formation: 22 January 1588
- First holder: Domenico Riviera

=== Secretaries of the Congregation for the Erection of Churches and Consistorial Provisions (1588–1965) ===
- Domenico Riviera (1710–1730)
- Carlo Gaetano Stampa (1735–1737)
- Niccola Paracciani Clarelli (1860–1872?)
- Carmine Gori-Merosi (1882–1886)
- Carlo Nocella (1892–1903)
- Gaetano de Lai (1908–1928)
- Carlo Perosi (1928–1930)
- Raffaele Rossi (1930–1948)
- Adeodato Giovanni Piazza (1948–1957)
- Marcello Mimmi (1957–1961)
- Carlo Confalonieri (1961–1965)

=== Prefects ===
In 1965, the head of the congregation took the title prefect, while the prefect's deputy took that of secretary.

- Carlo Confalonieri (1965–1973)
- Sebastiano Baggio (1973–1984)
- Bernardin Gantin (1984–1998)
- Lucas Moreira Neves, OP (1998–2000)
- Giovanni Battista Re (2000–2010)
- Marc Ouellet, PSS (2010–2023)
- Robert Francis Prevost, OSA (2023–2025) (elected Pope Leo XIV at the 2025 conclave)
- Filippo Iannone, OCarm (2025–present)

=== Secretaries ===
The secretary of the Dicastery for Bishops is concurrently the secretary of the College of Cardinals. During a papal election the secretary of the Dicastery acts as the secretary to the conclave.

- Francesco Carpino (1961–1967)
- Ernesto Civardi (1967–1979)
- Lucas Moreira Neves, OP (1979–1987)
- Giovanni Battista Re (1987–1989)
- Justin Francis Rigali (1989–1994)
- Jorge María Mejía (1994–1998)
- Francesco Monterisi (1998–2009)
- Manuel Monteiro de Castro (2009–2012)
- Lorenzo Baldisseri (2012–2013)
- Ilson de Jesus Montanari (2013–present)

== See also ==
- Appointment of Catholic bishops
- Congregation of Bishops and Regulars
