= Olga Krizova =

Slovak secular consecrated and academic

- Born: 1950 (age 75–76)
- Occupation: Don Bosco Volunteer

Olga Krizova V.D.B. (born 1950) is a Slovak Catholic and academic. She is a member of the Secular Volunteers of Don Bosco, a female-only Secular Institute of the Catholic Church with Salesian spirituality. As a member of the Volunteers of Don Bosco she is a consecrated layperson who has taken the vows of chastity, poverty and obedience but who does not live in a community and works in society.

Born in 1950 in Bratislava, then in Czechoslovakia, she entered the Secular Institute of Volunteers of Don Bosco (VDB) in 1970. The VDB was formed in 1917 by Fr Philip Rinaldi and was not initially recognised by the Catholic Church. In 1956 it was recognised as a Secular Institute with Pontifical rights.

She was elected to the leadership of the institute, as Moderator General, on 25 July 2007. She was reelected in 2013 and held office until July 2019 when she was replaced by Dagmar K, who is also from Slovakia. She is a former member of the Executive Council of CMIS, the World Council of Secular Institutes.

Krizova is one of the first seven women appointed to the Congregation for Institutes of Consecrated Life and Societies of Apostolic Life, the second highest-ranking department of the Roman Curia, the administrative institution of the Holy See. She became a member of the Congregation of Consecrated Life on 8 July 2019, when she was appointed by Pope Francis.

When appointed she said that she welcomed the appointment "on a personal level with great humility and trust in the Holy Spirit, on an institutional level with joy and gratitude, because the Church chose a woman of a secular institute in particular.”
