= Raffaella Petrini =

Italian Vatican official (born 1969)

Reverend Sister Raffaella Petrini FSE
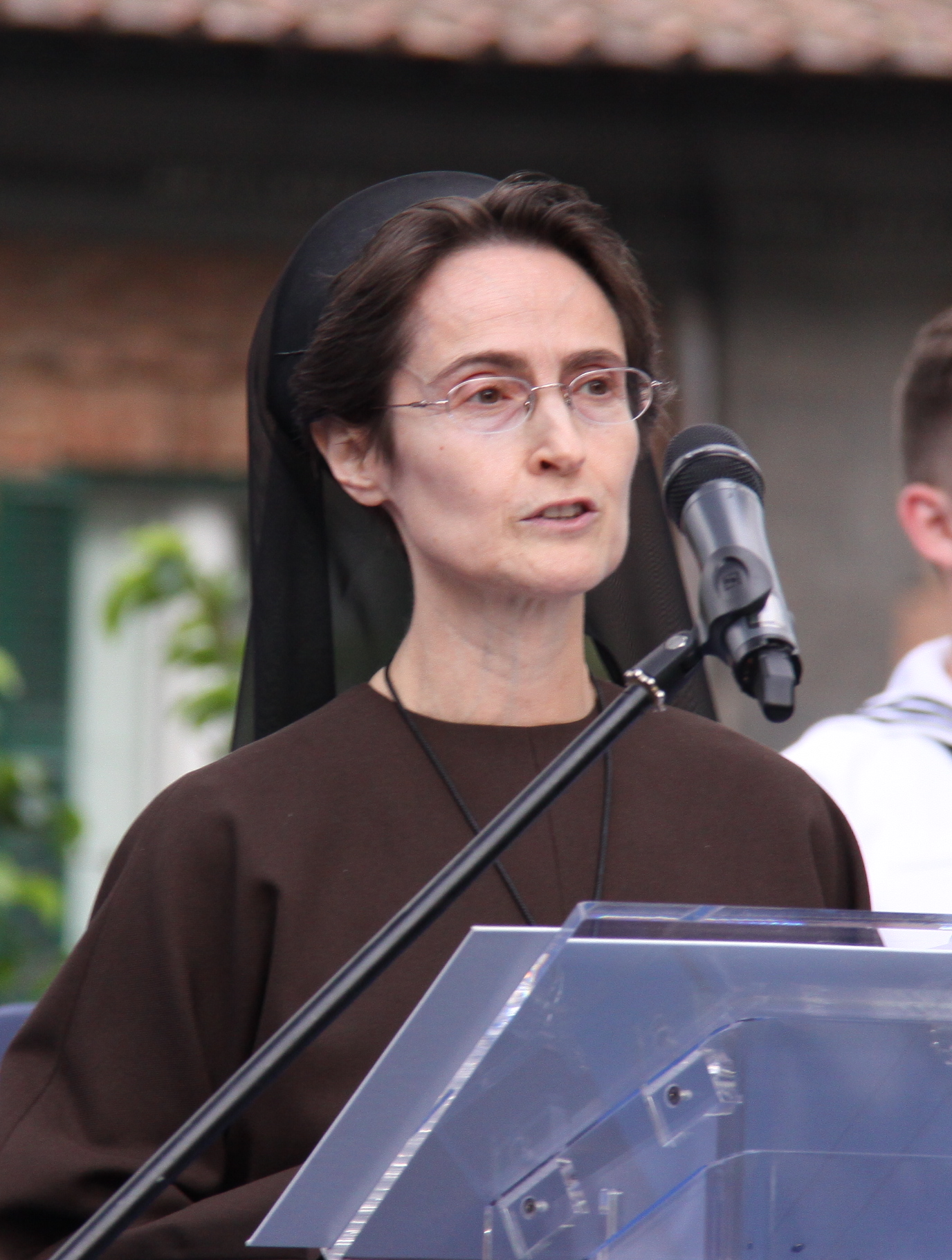
- Petrini in 2023

President of the Pontifical Commission for Vatican City State & President of the Governorate of Vatican City State
- Incumbent
- Assumed office 1 March 2025
- Preceded by: Cardinal Fernando Vérgez Alzaga

Secretary General of the Governorate of Vatican City State
- In office 4 November 2021 – 1 March 2025
- Preceded by: Bishop Fernando Vérgez Alzaga
- Succeeded by: Archbishop Emilio Nappa & Giuseppe Puglisi-Alibrandi

Personal life
- Born: 15 January 1969 (age 57) Rome, Italy
- Education: Libera Università Internazionale degli Studi Sociali; University of Hartford; Pontifical University of Saint Thomas Aquinas
- Known for: Professor at the Pontifical University of Saint Thomas Aquinas

Religious life
- Religion: Catholic
- Institute: Franciscan Sisters of the Eucharist

Raffaella Petrini FSE (born 15 January 1969) is an Italian Catholic religious sister who has served as president of the Pontifical Commission and Governorate of Vatican City State since March 2025. She was previously the commission's secretary general from 2021 to 2025. She is the first woman to hold those positions, two of the highest-ranking in the government. She is a member of the Franciscan Sisters of the Eucharist.

== Biography ==
Raffaella Petrini was born in Rome on 15 January 1969, and graduated with a degree in political science from the Libera Università Internazionale degli Studi Sociali in Rome. She then studied at the Barney School of Business at the University of Hartford in Connecticut, receiving a master's degree in organizational behavior in 2001. She entered the Pontifical University of Saint Thomas Aquinas in 2008, earning a licentiate 2011 and a doctorate in 2014. She was later appointed professor there and taught courses in welfare economics and the sociology of economic processes.

From 2005 to 2021, Petrini worked on the staff of the Congregation for the Evangelization of Peoples. On 4 November 2021, Pope Francis appointed her secretary general of the Governorate of Vatican City State, the first woman to hold that position. He later noted that she was the highest-ranking woman in the world's smallest state. On 13 July 2022, Pope Francis appointed women as members of the Dicastery for Bishops for the first time, including Petrini, Yvonne Reungoat, and María Lía Zervino.

On 15 February 2025, Pope Francis named Petrini president of the Pontifical Commission for Vatican City State and president of the Governorate of Vatican City State, effective 1 March. She was the first woman to occupy these positions. (Note: Because the statutes governing her positions did not allow for the appointment of a non-cardinal, Pope Francis gave her explicit authority over the two men named on 25 February, effective 1 March, to succeed her as secretaries general of the Governorate of Vatican City State, and on 21 November Pope Leo XIV modified the statutes of the Pontifical Commission to allow for the appointment of non-cardinals.)

Her authority was automatically suspended along with that of most Curial appointments upon the death of Pope Francis on 21 April 2025. His successor Pope Leo XIV confirmed her role on 9 May, the day after he took office. Article 8 n. 1, of the Fundamental Law, promulgated in 2023, previously stated: “The Pontifical Commission is composed of Cardinals, including the President, and of other members, appointed by the Supreme Pontiff for a five-year term.” But in 2025, Pope Leo XIV replaced this with, “The Pontifical Commission for Vatican City State is composed of Cardinals and other members, including the President, appointed by the Supreme Pontiff for a five-year term”, thus allowing people who are not Cardinals, including women, to be President.

== Notes ==
Catholic Church titles
| Preceded by Fernando Vérgez Alzaga | Secretary General of the Governorate of the Vatican City State; 4 November 2021 – 1 March 2025 | Succeeded by Emilio Nappa; Giuseppe Puglisi-Alibrandi |
| Preceded by Fernando Vérgez Alzaga | President of the Governorate of the Vatican City State; 1 March 2025 – present | Incumbent |
