= Dicastery for Institutes of Consecrated Life and Societies of Apostolic Life =

Dicastery of the Roman Curia

- Dicasterium pro Institutis vitae consecratae et Societatibus vitae apostolicae
- Coat of arms of the Holy See

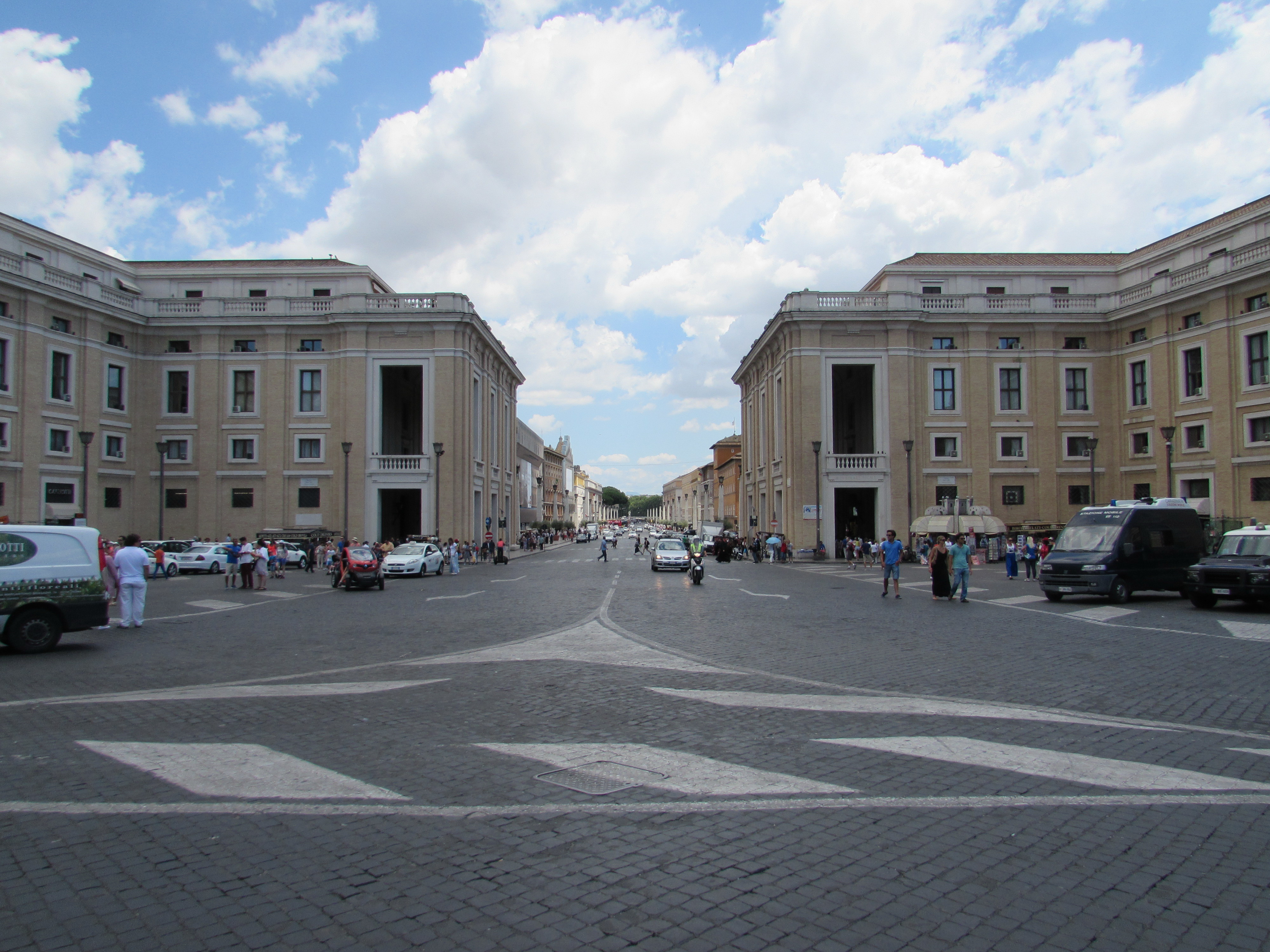
- Palazzo delle Congregazioni in Piazza Pio XII (in front of St. Peter's Square) is the workplace for most congregations of the Roman Curia

Dicastery overview
- Formed: May 27, 1586; 440 years ago
- Preceding agencies: Sacred Congregation for Consultations About Regulars; Congregation for Consultations About Bishops and Other Prelates; Congregation for Religious; Congregation for Religious and for Secular Institutes; Congregation for Institutes of Consecrated Life and Societies of Apostolic Life
- Type: Dicastery
- Headquarters: Palazzo delle Congregazioni, Piazza Pio XII, Rome, Italy
- Dicastery executives: Simona Brambilla, Prefect; Ángel Fernández Artime, Cardinal Pro-Prefect; Carmen Ros Nortes, Under-Secretary; F. Pier Luigi Nava, Under-Secretary
- Website: www.vitaconsacrata.va/it.html

The Dicastery for Institutes of Consecrated Life and Societies of Apostolic Life (DICLSAL; Latin: Dicasterium pro Institutis vitae consecratae et Societatibus vitae apostolicae), formerly called Congregation for Institutes of Consecrated Life and Societies of Apostolic Life (CICLSAL; Latin: Congregatio pro Institutis Vitae Consecratae et Societatibus Vitae Apostolicae), is the dicastery of the Roman Curia with competency over everything which concerns institutes of consecrated life (orders and religious congregations, both of men and of women, as well as secular institutes) and societies of apostolic life, regarding their government, discipline, studies, goods, rights, and privileges.

== Description ==
On 26 May 1587, Pope Sixtus V founded the Sacred Congregation for Consultations About Regulars (Congregatio super consultationibus regularium). In 1593 it was united to the Congregation of Bishops to form the Congregation of Bishops and Regulars. In addition to the Congregation for Bishops and Regulars, other congregations existed that exercised control over religious. One was the Congregation for the Discipline of Regulars (Congregatio super disciplina regularium), founded in 1649 by Pope Innocent X, reformed by Pope Innocent XII in 1695 and suppressed in 1906. Another was the Congregation on the State of Regular Orders (Congregatio de statu regularium ordinum), established by Pope Pius IX in 1846, and united with the former in 1856.

In 1908 Pope Pius X changed its name to the Congregation for Religious. In 1967 Pope Paul VI changed its name to the Congregation for Religious and Secular Institutes. Pope Francis gave the Congregation its current name with the March 19, 2022 apostolic constitution Praedicate evangelium.

The Dicastery is responsible for everything which concerns religious orders and congregations, and societies of apostolic life, regarding their government, discipline, studies and so on. It is competent also for matters regarding hermits, consecrated virgins, and new forms of consecrated life. Its jurisdiction is not limited territorially, but rather by the types of matters and organisations with which it deals – it may refer certain matters to other Vatican Dicasteries depending on the nature of the issue. The Dicastery also handles matters concerning associations of the faithful formed with the intention of becoming institutes of consecrated life or societies of apostolic life, and for Third Orders Seculars.

In 1994, the Congregation noted:

In some places it seems that religious community has lost its relevance in the eyes of women and men religious and is perhaps no longer an ideal to be pursued. [...] In many countries, increased state programs in areas in which religious have traditionally been active—such as social service, education and health—together with the decrease in vocations, have resulted in a diminished presence of religious in works which used to be typically those of apostolic institutes. [...] it is necessary to have religious communities with a clear charismatic identity, assimilated and lived, capable of transmitting them to others and disposed to share them, religious communities with an intense spirituality and missionary enthusiasm for communicating the same spirit and the same evangelizing thrust; religious communities who know how to animate and encourage lay people to share the charism of their institute, according to their secular character and according to their different style of life, inviting them to discover new ways of making the same charism and mission operative.

On 21 November 2014, Pope Francis declared a "Year of Consecrated Life" to begin on 30 November 2014, the First Sunday of Advent and continue to the Feast of the Presentation of Jesus at the Temple, 2 February 2016. The Congregation for Institutes of Consecrated Life and for Societies of Apostolic Life planned a number of initiatives to facilitate encounters between members of different expressions of consecrated and fraternal life in the various Churches.

Pope Francis addressed the Congregation in January 2017 on the theme of "Fidelity and perseverance" saying, "it is clear that one must first let oneself be evangelised in order to engage in evangelisation."

=== Institutes of consecrated life ===
Institutes of consecrated life are canonically erected institutes in the Roman Catholic Church whose members profess the evangelical counsels by vows of chastity, poverty, and obedience. There are two types:

==== Religious institutes ====
Religious institutes are characterized by the public profession of vows, communal life, and a degree of separation from the world. Some institutes are called Orders. These are Institutes in which, for historical reasons or because of their character or nature, solemn vows are made by at least some of the members. All members of these orders are called regulars (because they are governed by a Rule (regula)), and if they are women they are called nuns (moniales). The orders are older than the congregations. Other religious institutes are called congregations. Their members make simple vows; women who have taken these vows are known as sisters.

==== Secular institutes ====
A secular institute is an organization of consecrated individuals who, unlike members of a religious institute who live in community, live in the world, and work for the sanctification of the world from within.

Institutes may also be classified as a "clerical" or "lay institute" depending on whether the members exercise Holy Orders.

=== Society of apostolic life ===
A society of apostolic life is a group of men or women within the Catholic Church who have come together for a specific purpose and live fraternally.

Both Institutes of Consecrated Life and Societies of Apostolic Life need the written approval of a bishop to operate within his diocese, although a diocesan bishop can establish an institute of consecrated life or society in his own territory, after consulting the Apostolic See.

== Leadership ==
Prefect of Congregation for Institutes of Consecrated Life and Societies of Apostolic Life
- Coat of arms of the Holy See

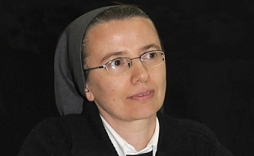
- Incumbent; Simona Brambilla since 2025
- Congregation for Institutes of Consecrated Life and Societies of Apostolic Life
- Member of: Roman Curia
- Reports to: The Pope
- Appointer: The Pope
- Term length: Five years, renewable

Since 6 January 2025, the Prefect has been Sister Simona Brambilla and the Pro-Prefect has been Cardinal Ángel Fernández Artime; the two undersecretaries are Father Pier Luigi Nava, S.S.M. and Sister Carmen Ros Nortes, a member of the Sisters of Our Lady of Consolation.

Until the appointment of Fernández Artime as pro-prefect, that title was assigned on a temporary basis to a prelate who was not yet a cardinal and his title became prefect when he became a cardinal. Now that prefect need not be a cardinal or even a cleric, its significance awaits clarification.

On 8 July 2019, in naming 21 new members to the Congregation, Pope Francis included women for the first time. All seven of them were superiors of their orders: six are leaders of international religious orders, and one leads an institute of consecrated laywomen: Kathleen Appler, Yvonne Reungoat, Françoise Massy, Luigia Coccia, Simona Brambilla, Rita Calvo Sanz and Olga Krizova. Catherine Clifford, of Saint Paul University in Ottawa, said "The recent move of Pope Francis represents a new and significant development in that it would give women a deliberative voice in the governing body of the congregation, which until now has been the domain of cardinals, bishops, and the heads of men's religious orders."

=== Prefects since 1908 ===
- José Calassanç Vives y Tuto, OFM Cap (1908–1913)
- Ottavio Cagiano de Azevedo (1913–1915)
- Domenico Serafini, OSB (1916)
- Diomede Falconio, OFM (1916–1917)
- Giulio Tonti (1917–1918)
- Raffaele Scapinelli di Léguigno (1918–1920)
- Teodoro Valfre di Bonzo (1920–1922)
- Camillo Laurenti (1922–1928)
- Alexis Lépicier, OSM (1928–1935)
- Vincenzo Lapuma (1935–1943)
- Luigi Lavitrano (1945–1950)
- Clemente Micara (1950–1953)
- Valerio Valeri (1953–1963)
- Ildebrando Antoniutti (1963–1973)
- Arturo Tabera Araoz, CMF (1973–1975)
- Eduardo Francisco Pironio (pro-prefect 1975–1976, prefect 1976–1984)
- Jean Jérôme Hamer, OP (pro-prefect 1984–1985, prefect 1985–1992)
- Eduardo Martínez Somalo (1992–2004)
- Franc Rode, CM (2004–2011)
- João Braz de Aviz (2011–2025)
- Simona Brambilla (2025–present)

=== Secretaries since 1908 ===
- Donato Sbarretti (1910–1916)
- Adolfo Turchi (1916–1918)
- Mauro Serafini (1918–1925)
- Vincenzo Lapuma (1925–1935)
- Luca Ermenegildo Pasetto (1935–1950)
- Arcadio Larraona Saralegui, CMF (1950–1959)
- Paul-Pierre Philippe, OP (1959–1967)
- Antonio Mauro (1967–1969)
- Edward Louis Heston, CSC (1969–1971)
- Paul Augustin Mayer, OSB (1971–1984)
- Vincenzo Fagiolo (1984–1990)
- Francisco Javier Errázuriz Ossa, P.Schönstatt (1990–1996)
- Piergiorgio Nesti, CP (1996–2006)
- Gianfranco Gardin, OFM Conv. (2006–2009)
- Joseph William Tobin, CSSR (2010–2012)
- José Rodríguez Carballo, OFM (2012–2023)
- Simona Brambilla, M.C. (2023–2025)
- Tiziana Merletti, SFP (22 May 2025–)

== See also ==
- Perfectae caritatis, Decree on the Adaptation and Renewal of Religious Life
- Exclaustration, which is granted by the congregation
