= Pontifical Commission for Vatican City State =

Vatican City legislative body

- Coat of arms of Vatican City

Type
- Type: Unicameral

History
- Founded: 1939

Leadership
- President: Raffaella Petrini since 1 March 2025

Structure
- Seats: 7
- Length of term: 5 years

Meeting place
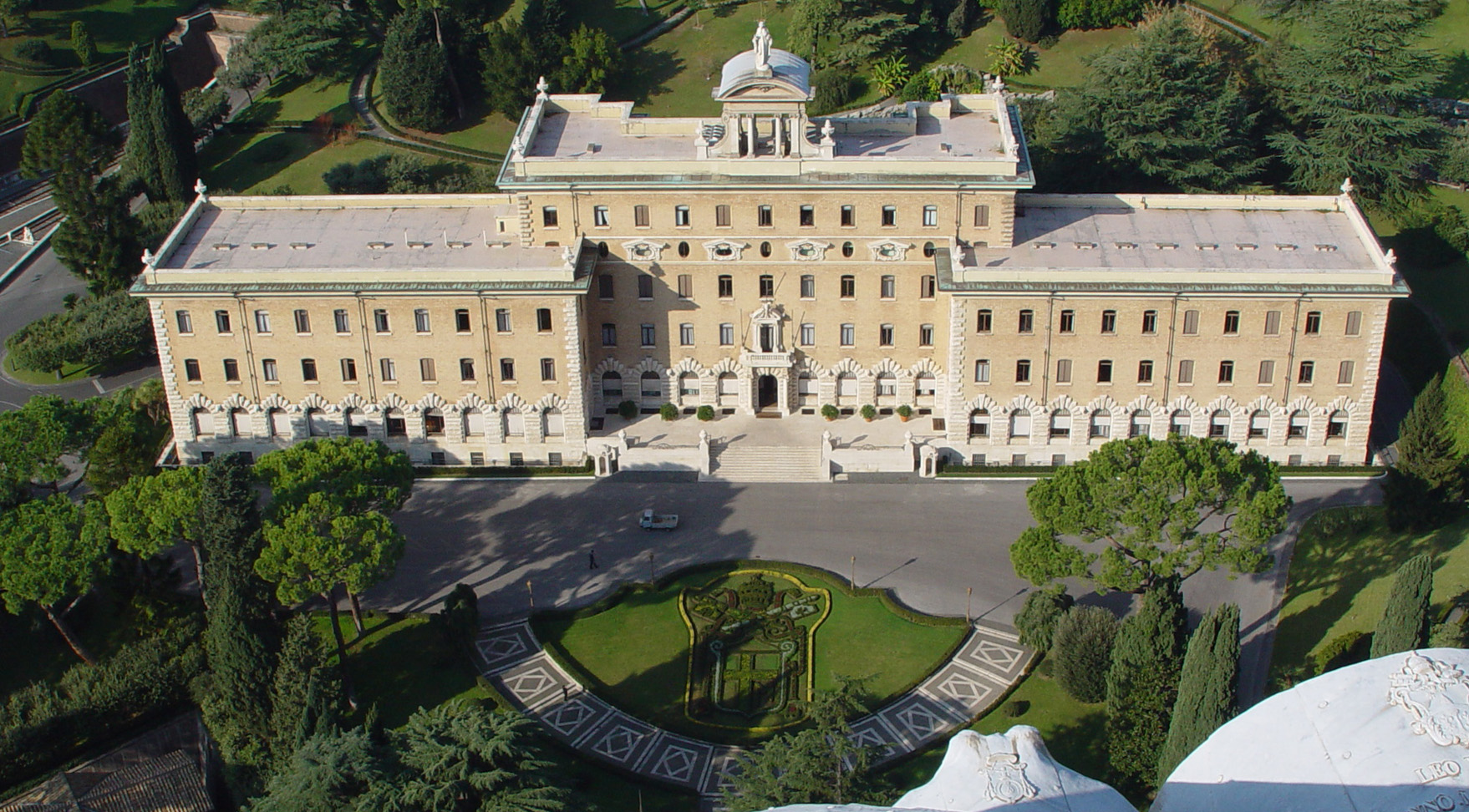
- Palace of the Governorate

Website
- Official website

The Pontifical Commission for Vatican City State (Latin: Pontificia Commissio pro Civitate Vaticana, Italian: Pontificia Commissione per lo Stato della Città del Vaticano) is the legislative body of Vatican City. It consists of a president, who also holds the title of President of the Governorate and deputizes as the head of government of Vatican City, as well as six cardinals appointed by the Pope, the head of state of Vatican City, for five-year terms.

The Pontifical Commission was created in 1939 by Pius XII. Laws and regulations proposed by the Commission must be submitted to the Pope through the Secretariat of State prior to being made public and taking effect. Laws, regulations, and instructions enacted by the Commission are published in the Acta Apostolicae Sedis.

== Current members ==
Following the most recent changes on 15 October 2025, the president and the members are:

Position	Name	National origin	Other positions
President	Sister Raffaella Petrini	Italy	President of the Governorate of Vatican City State
Members	Cardinal Kevin J. Farrell	United States	Camerlengo of the Holy Roman Church; Prefect of the Dicastery for the Laity, Family and Life
Members	Cardinal Claudio Gugerotti	Italy	Prefect of the Dicastery for the Eastern Churches
Members	Cardinal Arthur Roche	UK	Prefect of the Dicastery for Divine Worship and the Discipline of the Sacraments
Members	Cardinal Lazzaro You Heung-sik	South Korea	Prefect of the Dicastery for the Clergy
Members	Cardinal Blase Cupich	United States	Archbishop of Chicago
Members	Cardinal Baldassare Reina	Italy	Vicar General of the Diocese of Rome

== Governorate of Vatican City State ==
Administrations and departments of Vatican City's government, including the Corps of Gendarmerie of Vatican City, the Vatican Observatory, the Vatican Museums and the Department of Pontifical Villas, which administers Castel Gandolfo, report to the Governorate.

The functions of the Governorate include:

- Legal office
- Office for Personnel
- Office for Civil Records
- Archives
- Accounting Office
- Numismatic and Philatelic office
- Post and Telegraph office
- Shipping office
- Police Department (Corps of Gendarmerie of Vatican City)
- Tourist Information Office
- Department of Museums and Galleries (Vatican Museums)
- Department of Economic Services
- Department of Technical Services
- Vatican Observatory
- Castel Gandolfo
- Office for Archaeological Research

== President ==
President of the Governorate of Vatican City State
- Incumbent; Sister Raffaella Petrini since 1 March 2025
- Type: Delegated head of government (Note: The pope wields all executive power in the Vatican City State; however, the pope, as head of state and de jure head of government, delegates the day-to-day exercise of this and the running of government departments to the President of the Governorate of Vatican City State, making them de facto head of government.)
- Member of: Governorate of Vatican City State; Pontifical Commission for Vatican City State
- Reports to: The Pope
- Appointer: The Pope

The president of the Pontifical Commission also serves as the Vatican City State's de facto head of government, as the president of the Governorate of Vatican City State, an office that is distinct from the former title of governor of Vatican City. (Note: The post of Governor of the Vatican City State (Italian: Governatore dello Stato della Città del Vaticano) was held by Marchese Camillo Serafini from the foundation of the state in 1929 until his death in 1952. The governor had power to appoint and supervise the people running the city state. During Serafini's lifetime, the powers of the governor were limited by Pope Pius XII in 1939 by the establishment of the Pontifical Commission for Vatican City State. No successor was appointed and the position was abolished on Serafini's death.) In addition to their legislative role, the president is delegated executive authority for Vatican City by the Pope. As a senior member of the Roman Curia, the president has usually been a cardinal. Raffaella Petrini is the first woman to hold the position. Article 8 n. 1, of the Fundamental Law, promulgated in 2023, previously stated: "The Pontifical Commission is composed of Cardinals, including the President, and of other members, appointed by the Supreme Pontiff for a five-year term." But in 2025, Pope Leo XIV replaced this with "The Pontifical Commission for Vatican City State is composed of Cardinals and other members, including the President, appointed by the Supreme Pontiff for a five-year term", thus allowing people who are not cardinals to be president.

When the papacy is vacant, the term of the president ends, as do most other offices in the Curia, and the person occupying the position becomes a member of the Commission that handles some of the functions of head of state until a new pope is chosen, along with the Cardinal Secretary of State and the Cardinal Camerlengo.

=== List ===
No.	Image	Name	Nationality	Term	Reigning pope(s)
1		Cardinal; Nicola Canali (1874–1961)	Italy	20 March 1939 – 3 August 1961	Pius XII; John XXIII
2		Cardinal; Amleto Giovanni Cicognani (1883–1973)	Italy	12 August 1961 – 30 April 1969	John XXIII; Paul VI
3		Cardinal; Jean-Marie Villot (1905–1979)	France	2 May 1969 – 9 March 1979	Paul VI; John Paul I; John Paul II
4		Cardinal; Agostino Casaroli (1914–1998)	Italy	28 April 1979 – 8 April 1984	John Paul II
5		Cardinal; Sebastiano Baggio (1913–1993)	Italy	8 April 1984 – 31 October 1990	John Paul II
6		Cardinal; Rosalio José Castillo Lara (1922–2007)	Venezuela	31 October 1990 – 15 October 1997	John Paul II
7		Cardinal; Edmund Szoka (1927–2014)	United States	15 October 1997 – 15 September 2006	John Paul II; Benedict XVI
8		Cardinal; Giovanni Lajolo (born 1935)	Italy	15 September 2006 – 1 October 2011	Benedict XVI
9		Cardinal; Giuseppe Bertello (born 1942)	Italy	1 October 2011 – 1 October 2021	Benedict XVI; Francis
10		Cardinal; Fernando Vérgez Alzaga (born 1945)	Spain	1 October 2021 – 1 March 2025	Francis
11		Sister; Raffaella Petrini (born 1969)	Italy	1 March 2025 – present	Francis; Leo XIV

== See also ==
- Index of Vatican City–related articles
- Politics of Vatican City
- Pontifical commission
