= Yvonne Reungoat =

French religious sister (born 1945)

Mother Yvonne Reungoat
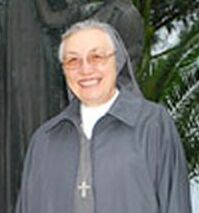
- Mother Yvonne Reungoat
- Title: President of the Union of Major Superiors of Italy

Personal life
- Born: 14 January 1945 (age 81) Plouénan, France
- Education: University of Lyon
- Known for: First non-Italian Superior General of the Salesian Sisters of Don Bosco

Religious life
- Religion: Catholic
- Institute: Congregation for Institutes of Consecrated Life and Societies of Apostolic Life

Senior posting
- Present post: Member of the Congregation for Institutes of Consecrated Life and Societies of Apostolic Life

Yvonne Reungoat FMA (born 14 January 1945) is a French religious sister, who is a former Superior General of the Daughters of Mary Help of Christians. In July 2022, she has been appointed as a member in the Vatican's Dicastery for Bishops.

== Biography ==
Yvonne Reungoat was born in Plouénan, France on 14 January 1945 and entered into religious life on 5 August 1965. She earned a degree in History and Geography at the University of Lyon and became a school teacher in Lyon for 11 years.

From 1983 to 1989 she was in charge of the French province of the Sacred Heart, then she was sent to Africa. In 1991, she became the first provincial superior of the African province of the Mother of God. In setting up the newly founded works in West Africa, she placed particular value on the training of young African sisters, the founding of youth and school centers and the promotion of women's projects.

Between 1996 and 2008, she was a member of the General Chapter and in 2002 was elected Vicary General of this institute. In 2008, when elected Superior General by the chapter, she was after 136 years of Italian mother superiors the first French to hold this post. On 5 April 2018, she was elected president of the Union of Major Superiors of Italy in its 65th National Assembly.

On 8 July 2019, Reungoat is one of the first seven women appointed members of the Congregation for Institutes of Consecrated Life and Societies of Apostolic Life by Pope Francis. On 13 July 2022, Pope Francis appointed women as members of the Dicastery for Bishops for the first time, two religious and one consecrated virgin: Yvonne Reungoat, Raffaella Petrini, and María Lía Zervino.

In January 2021, Reungoat she promoted to Officier of the Légion d’Honneur. She had previously been appointed a Chevalier of the Légion d’Honneur.
