= Colonus (person) =

Tenant farmer in the late Roman Empire

In the Late Roman Empire and the Early Middle Ages a colonus (plural: coloni) was a tenant farmer. Known collectively as the colonate, these farmers operated as sharecroppers, paying landowners with a portion of their crops in exchange for use of their farmlands.

The tenant-landlord relationship eventually degraded into one of debt and dependence. As a result, the colonus system (colona, colonatus) became a new type of land tenancy, placing the occupants in a state between freedom and slavery. The system can be considered a predecessor of European feudal serfdom.

== History ==
In Roman Italy, much of the agricultural land was leased to tenants. There was a concept in place that allowed the tenants to have tenure on the land, even though they were not the owners. Tax liabilities went with the sales of a land plot, but most of the taxed public land in Italy was leased rather than owned. Therefore, many of the taxes were imposed upon the tenants rather than the land owners. These tenants could also sell and buy leases, which indicates a somewhat flexible and fair property system. According to the Roman courts, agricultural tenants also had rights against landowners who tried to unjustly infringe upon their contracts. This time period indicated a degree of fairness and justice toward the coloni.

Originally, a colonus was in a mutual relationship in which a landowner allowed a tenant the use of their land, in return for a portion of the farmed crops. However, during the reign of Diocletian (284–305), there was a reform in the taxation system, which many historians view as causing the shift in the tenant-landowner relationship. Several edicts tied coloni to the land in order to increase land taxes and poll taxes. Diocletian created a complex tax system based on persons as well as a regular census of the people to monitor the empire's population and wealth. The tax rates were computed by complex mathematical formula. The system was distributive, i.e. it did not take in consideration capacity to pay as would be the case in a contributive system (adopted by the Eastern Empire in the later 7th century). By converting ad hoc requisitions and regular tax demands into a regular system of tax collectives, Diocletian had given the Empire a budget for the first time.

The status of these farm workers gradually declined until they reached an all-time low during the reign of Justinian (527–565). His top goal was to eliminate corruption in tax collecting by giving governors more direct control. In Book 11 of his codification of Roman law, the Corpus juris civilis, Justinian updated laws based upon taxation, distribution of land, and types of coloni. When describing the agricolae censiti, Justinian explicitly mentions a type of coloni, the coloni adscripticii, which were considered non-free and comparable to slaves.

== Adscripticii ==
An estate owner could claim a laborer as a colonus adscripticius with the intention that this person would provide him services. The landowner would also need to show proof through two documents, such as a conductionale instrumentum or a conductio (a labor contract), or a copy of the publici census adscriptio (a receipt of his enrollment into the public tax register). These documents would prevent people from being unknowingly drawn into the adscripticii, as such contracts were often not able to be annulled. By signing onto a contract, a man would sign his family, children, and self into the adscripticii. The birth status, or origo, of this family and descendants would thus be adscripticii.

According to the rules of international private law (ius gentium), one's origo determined their hometown, public and private law system, and the public tasks they must perform (munera and honores). In the cases of the colonus adscripticius, their hometown was substituted or replaced with the estate of the landowner. Therefore, the land owner could summon one of his colonus farmers to perform duties, such as the way a town could summon its citizen to perform public duties. If the landowner of the estate should sell his property, the coloni adscripticii tied to the estate would be forced to work for the new owner. Thus, they were forced to do the bidding of the landowner, attached to a specific plot of land, and bound to the contract indefinitely. The only difference between the coloni and slaves was that the coloni were attached to a specific piece of land, and could not be sold or separated from it.

The adscripticii had many obligations to the estate. They had to perform tasks on the estate, till and farm the land, perform the work that a colonus would perform, and remain on the estate. They were also unable to litigate or lodge complaints against the estate owner. Adscripticii who tried to leave the estate without permission were punished, with the methods ranging from being forced to wear chains to corporal punishment. The free coloni, although subjected to the estate owner with whom they had a contract, were able to leave the estate. Most important were the differences concerning their right to possessions (peculium). Coloni adscripticii were forced to subject their possessions to the estate owner and were forbidden from removing them from the house without permission. Free coloni were able to move their possessions as they wished and were not subjected to orders of the estate owners.

=== Adscriptus glebae ===
A laborer was called an "adscript of the soil" (adscriptus glebae) when he could be sold or transferred with the land, as under feudal villeinage and with serfdom in the Russian Empire until 1861.

== Taxation ==
Free coloni were responsible for the taxes of the leased land on which they farmed crops and lived. They had two options of paying this: either by paying the tax directly to the imperial officials, or they could turn over a lump sum to the landowner. If the colonus decided to give the owner the lump sum, or tota summa, the estate owner turned over the appropriate amount to the tax collector and kept the remaining balance as income. When a colonus adscripticius signed a contract to work for the landowner indefinitely, the landowner was then forced to take responsibility for the taxes that the farmer would have paid if he was just a tenant leasing the land. Free tenants paid their own taxes to the government. The person who housed the adscripticius had the use of his labor, so they were liable for his taxes.

During the fourth and fifth centuries, the leasing contracts were very formal and had strict requirements. Tenancy agreements had to be registered in the municipal tax rolls, and had to include the tenant's name, a particular plot of land, and the landowner's name. The tenant was then added to the tax roll for that specific field and could therefore be identified as part of the chain of responsibility for that parcel of land. Being registered in the imperial or municipal tax rolls also provided additional benefits. Tenants who were registered taxpayers were lawfully protected against eviction and the raising of their rents.

== Latifundia and estates ==
Latifundia were large parcels of land, which specialized in agriculture for export, such as grain, olive oil, and cattle. Latifundia relied on slave labor to produce large quantities of crops. These were developed in the 2nd century BC. In some cases, estate villages were formed, in which many parcels of land owned by the same landlord were leased to villagers who owned their own homes but had no land.

Large estates expanded by consolidating the neighboring, smaller farms, which had to sell their land to the estate, as they could not compete in terms of productivity. As small farms were bought up by the wealthy landowners they were folded into their expansion. They tended to go out of fashion with the increase in the cost of the purchase slaves by 200 A.D.

Estates, massa, were the successors of the latifundia. The rich Roman landowners preferred rents gathered from free or tied tenants who outnumbered enslaved agricultural workers many times over, hence ptiicoloni and adscripticii. The state and the rich patrons benefited from the labor of an immobilized tenantry.
