= Pecci =

Pecci may refer to:

== People ==
- Eraldo Pecci (born 1955), Italian footballer
- Giuseppe Pecci (1807–1890), theologian and Roman Catholic Cardinal
- Víctor Pecci (born 1955), Paraguayan tennis player.
- Pope Leo XIII (1810–1903), born Count Vincenzo Gioacchino Raffaele Luigi Pecci, Pope of the Roman Catholic Church (from 1878 to 1903)

== Places ==
- Centro per l'arte contemporanea Luigi Pecci (Centre for Contemporary Art Luigi Pecci), Prato near Florence, Italy
