= Cardinal Howard =

Cardinal Howard may refer to:

- Philip Howard (cardinal) (1629–1694)
- Edward Henry Howard (1829–1892)
