= Pontifical Academy of Saint Thomas Aquinas =

Pontifical academy established in 1879

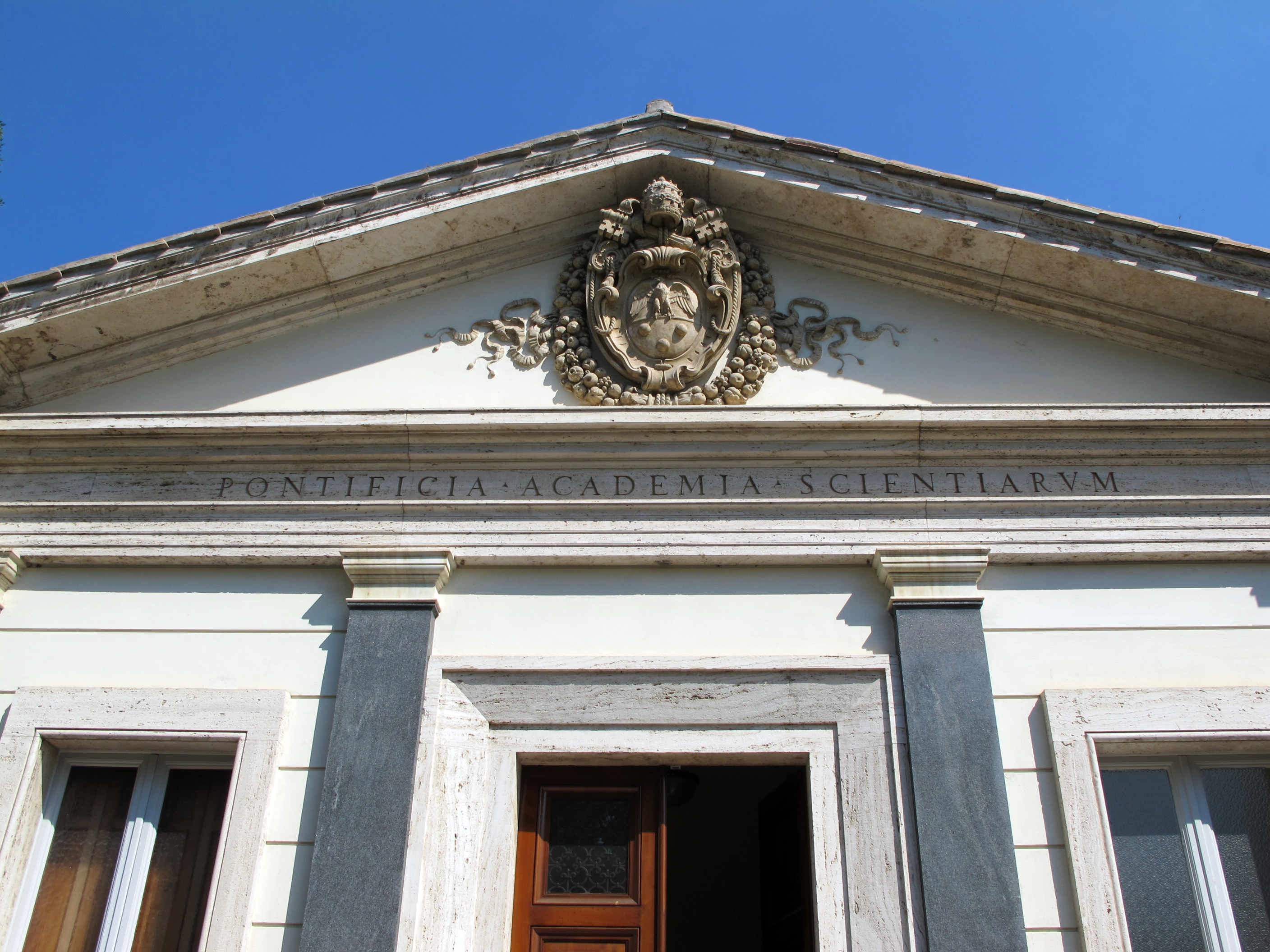
The Pontifical Academy of Saint Thomas Aquinas

The Pontifical Academy of Saint Thomas Aquinas (PAST; Latin: Pontificia Academia Sancti Thomae Aquinati) is a pontifical academy established on 15 October 1879 by Pope Leo XIII. The academy is one of the pontifical academies housed along with the academies of science at Casina Pio IV in Vatican City, Rome.

== History ==
The Pontifical Academy of St. Thomas Aquinas was established on 15 October 1879 by Leo XIII, who approved its statutes with a brief of 9 May 1895. Leo appointed his brother, Giuseppe Pecci (1879–1890) a prominent Thomistic scholar, as first Prefect. The academy was founded with thirty members: ten from Rome, ten from the rest of Italy, and ten from other countries. Through Pecci, PAST helped establish Thomist programs at Bologna, Fribourg (Switzerland), Paris, and Lowden.

Upon the death of Pecci in 1890, Tommaso Maria Zigliara, professor of theology at the Collegium Divi Thomae (the future Pontifical University of Saint Thomas Aquinas, Angelicum) became Prefect. The academy was confirmed by Pope Pius X with his apostolic letter of 23 January 1904. Under Pius X, neo-Thomism became the blueprint for theology.

Until 1965 the presidency of the PAST was held by a group of cardinals. Pope Paul VI appointed the first single cardinal as president, Cardinal Michael Browne. After his death in 1971, the presidency remained vacant until the appointment of Cardinal Mario Luigi Ciappi in 1979. After his death in 1996, Pope John Paul II reformed the academy on 28 January 1999 with his apostolic letter Inter munera Academiarium, issued shortly after his encyclical Fides et ratio. The office of president would no longer be bestowed on a cardinal and its appointment would be for a five-year period. Abelardo Lobato, professor of philosophy at the College of Saint Thomas, the future Pontifical University of Saint Thomas Aquinas, Angelicum, served as president from 1999 to 2005.

== Present day ==
With Pope Francis' reorganization of the Roman Curia as of 5 June 2022 as provided for in the apostolic constitution Praedicate evangelium, the new Dicastery for Culture and Education became responsible for coordinating the work of the academy with its own work and that of a number of other bodies.

The academy was founded in 1879 by Pope Leo XIII to study and promote the thought of St. Thomas Aquinas in service to the Church and the world.

The Pontifical Academy of Saint Thomas Aquinas is temporarily headquartered in the Casina Pio IV in the Vatican City. Its objectives, as stated in the academy's Yearbook 2007, are the following:

- Carry out research, explain, and disseminate the teaching of Thomas Aquinas
- Propose Aquinas as a model Christian teacher, seeker of truth, lover of good, and scholar of all learning
- Be at the service of all the teaching of Aquinas in accord with the Christian tradition and the magisterium of the church, especially as set out in the encyclicals Aeterni Patris and Fides et ratio
- Explain, in as much as this is possible, the mystery of faith and the analogical connections between articles of faith according to the thinking of Aquinas, thereby also honouring his title, Doctor Communis
- Encourage interaction between faith and reason, and foster increasing dialogue between philosophy and theology
- Amicable cooperation with members of other academies to promote Christian philosophy and theology
- Stimulate international interaction between scholars of Aquinas and his work
- Further the role of Thomistic thought in society
- Promote education in Thomistic studies and the public's understanding of the ideas of Aquinas
- Encourage research into the work and thought of Aquinas

The Academy meets annually in Rome. The scholars decided to adopt annual themes for their meetings to align with the interests and priorities expressed by the pope. In 2019 the theme was "salvation", drawn from the letter "Placuit Deo" on aspects of Christian salvation.

The current president of the PAST is Serge-Thomas Bonino. The current secretary is Bishop Marcelo Sánchez Sorondo.

== See also ==
- Index of Vatican City–related articles
- Pontifical Academy of Sciences
- Pontifical Academy of Social Sciences
