= Pope Leo XIII =

Head of the Catholic Church from 1878 to 1903

- Bishop of Rome
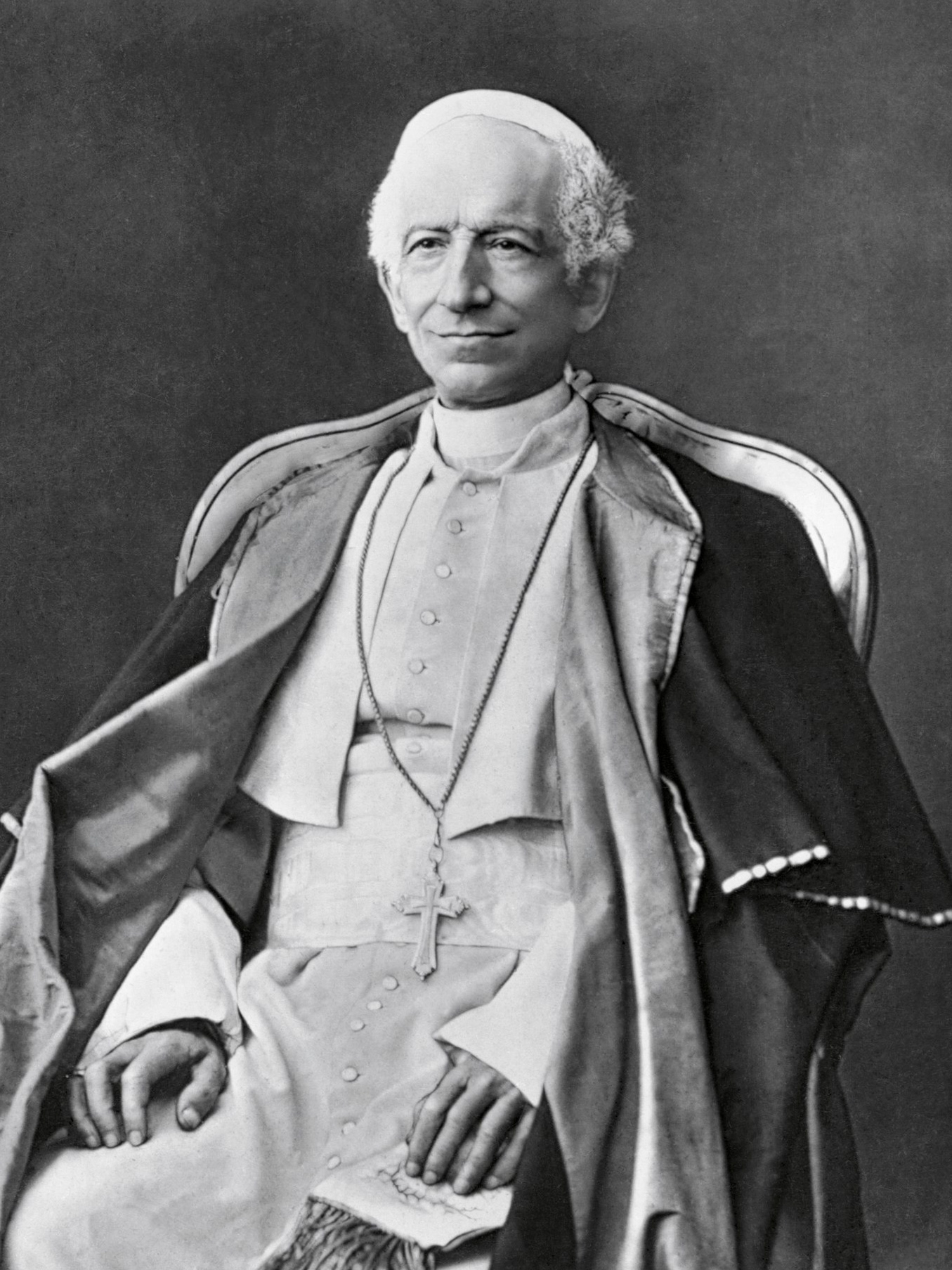
- Leo XIII, c. 1878
- Church: Catholic Church
- Papacy began: 20 February 1878
- Papacy ended: 20 July 1903
- Predecessor: Pius IX
- Successor: Pius X
- Previous posts: Titular Archbishop of Tamiathis (1843‍–‍1846); Apostolic Nuncio to Belgium (1843‍–‍1846); Archbishop of Perugia (1846‍–‍1878); Cardinal Priest of San Crisogono (1853‍–‍1878); Camerlengo of the Apostolic Chamber (1877‍–‍1878)

Orders
- Ordination: 31 December 1837 by Carlo Odescalchi
- Consecration: 19 February 1843 by Luigi Lambruschini
- Created cardinal: 19 December 1853 by Pius IX
- Rank: Cardinal priest

Personal details
- Born: Gioacchino Vincenzo Raffaele Luigi Pecci; 2 March 1810 Carpineto Romano, Rome, French Empire
- Died: 20 July 1903 (aged 93) Apostolic Palace, Rome, Italy
- Signature: Leo XIII's signature

- Coat of arms: Leo XIII's coat of arms

Ordination history
History
Priestly ordination
- Ordained by: Carlo Odescalchi
- Date: 31 December 1837
Episcopal consecration
- Principal consecrator: Luigi Lambruschini
- Co-consecrators: Fabio Maria Asquini; Giuseppe Maria Castellani
- Date: 19 February 1843
Cardinalate
- Elevated by: Pope Pius IX
- Date: 19 December 1853
Episcopal succession
Bishops consecrated by Pope Leo XIII as principal consecrator
- Antonio Briganti: 19 November 1871
- Carmelo Pascucci: 19 November 1871
- Carlo Laurenzi: 24 June 1877
- Edoardo Borromeo: 19 May 1878
- Francesco Latoni: 1 June 1879
- Jean-Baptiste-François Pitra: 1 June 1879
- Bartholomew Woodlock: 1 June 1879
- Agostino Bausa: 24 March 1889
- Giuseppe Antonio Ermenegildo Prisco: 29 May 1898

Pope Leo XIII (Italian: Leone XIII; born Gioacchino Vincenzo Raffaele Luigi Pecci; (Note: Italian: [dʒoakˈkiːno vinˈtʃɛntso raffaˈɛːle luˈiːdʒi ˈpettʃi]) 2 March 1810 – 20 July 1903) was head of the Catholic Church from 1878 until his death in 1903. He had the fourth-longest reign and third-longest verified reign of any pope, behind those of St. Peter, Pius IX (his predecessor), and John Paul II.

Born in Carpineto Romano, near Rome, Leo XIII is well known for his intellectualism and for seeking to define the position of the Catholic Church with regard to modern thinking. Pope Leo XIII wrote a total of 86 encyclicals during his papacy from 1878 to 1903. In his 1891 encyclical Rerum novarum, Pope Leo outlined the rights of workers to a fair wage, safe working conditions, and the formation of trade unions, while affirming the rights to property and free enterprise, opposing both atheistic communism and laissez-faire capitalism. With that encyclical, Leo XIII became popularly called the "Social Pope" and the "Pope of the Workers", also having created the foundations for modern thinking in the social doctrines of the Catholic Church, influencing his successors. He influenced the Mariology of the Catholic Church and promoted both the rosary and the scapular. Upon his election, he immediately sought to revive Thomism, the theological system of Thomas Aquinas, wishing to make it the official political, theological, and philosophical foundation of the Catholic Church. As a result, he sponsored the Editio Leonina in 1879.

Leo XIII is remembered for his belief that pastoral activity in political sociology is also a vital mission of the church as a vehicle of social justice and maintaining the rights and dignity of the human person. He issued a record eleven papal encyclicals on the rosary, earning him the title "Rosary Pope". He also approved two new Marian scapulars. He was the first pope never to have held any control over the Papal States, which had been dissolved by 1870, since Stephen II in the 8th century. Similarly, many of his policies were oriented toward mitigating the loss of the Papal States in an attempt to overcome the loss of temporal power, but nonetheless continuing the Roman Question.

Leo XIII was also a prominent opponent of Freemasonry. In the 1884 encyclical Humanum Genus, he reaffirmed earlier papal condemnations of Masonic organizations and argued that their principles were incompatible with Catholic doctrine. The encyclical presented Freemasonry as a leading force behind secularism, religious indifferentism, and efforts to diminish the influence of Christianity in public life. Leo returned to the subject in several subsequent documents, making opposition to Freemasonry a recurring theme of his pontificate.

On July 1903, Leo XIII died at the age of 93 from pneumonia, followed by hemorrhagic pleurisy; he was buried in the Vatican Grottoes. In 1924, his remains were transferred to the Archbasilica of Saint John Lateran.

== Early life and education (1810–1836) ==
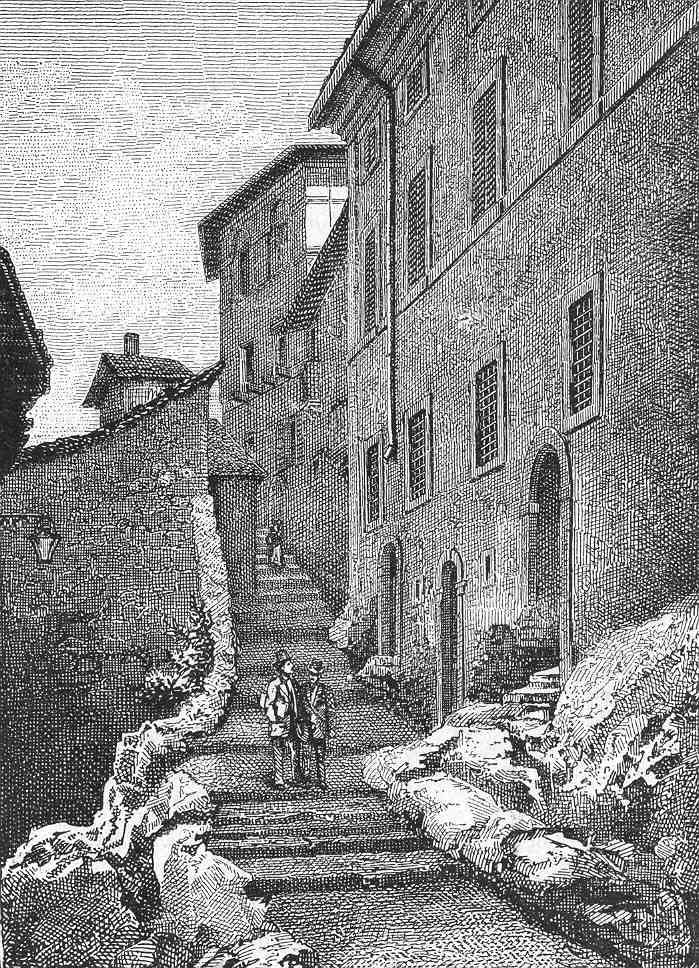
The house in Carpineto Romano in which the Pecci brothers grew up

Gioacchino Vincenzo Raffaele Luigi Pecci was born in Carpineto Romano, near Rome, the sixth of the seven children of Count Domenico Ludovico Pecci (2 June 1767 – 8 March 1833), Patrician of Siena, Colonel of the French Army under Napoleon, and his wife Anna Francesca Prosperi-Buzzi (1773 – 9 August 1824). His uncle Giuseppe Pecci was a protonotary apostolic and referendary of the Signature of Justice and died in 1806. His brothers included Giuseppe and Giovanni Battista or Giambattista Pecci (26 October 1802 – 28 March 1882), 1st Count Pecci (Comes Romanus by Papal brief in 1880), who married on 8 August 1851 Angela Salina (7 February 1830 – 9 October 1899) and had issue, and sister Anna Maria Pecci, wife of Michelangelo Pecci. Until 1818, he lived at home with his family "in which religion counted as the highest grace on earth, as through her, salvation can be earned for all eternity". Together with Giuseppe, he studied in the Jesuit College in Viterbo until 1824. He enjoyed Latin and was known to have written his own Latin poems at the age of eleven. (Note: Leo is said to have been the last Pope to have directly composed his writings in Latin, rather than have them translated into Latin.) Leo was a descendant of the Italian leader Cola di Rienzo on his mother's side.

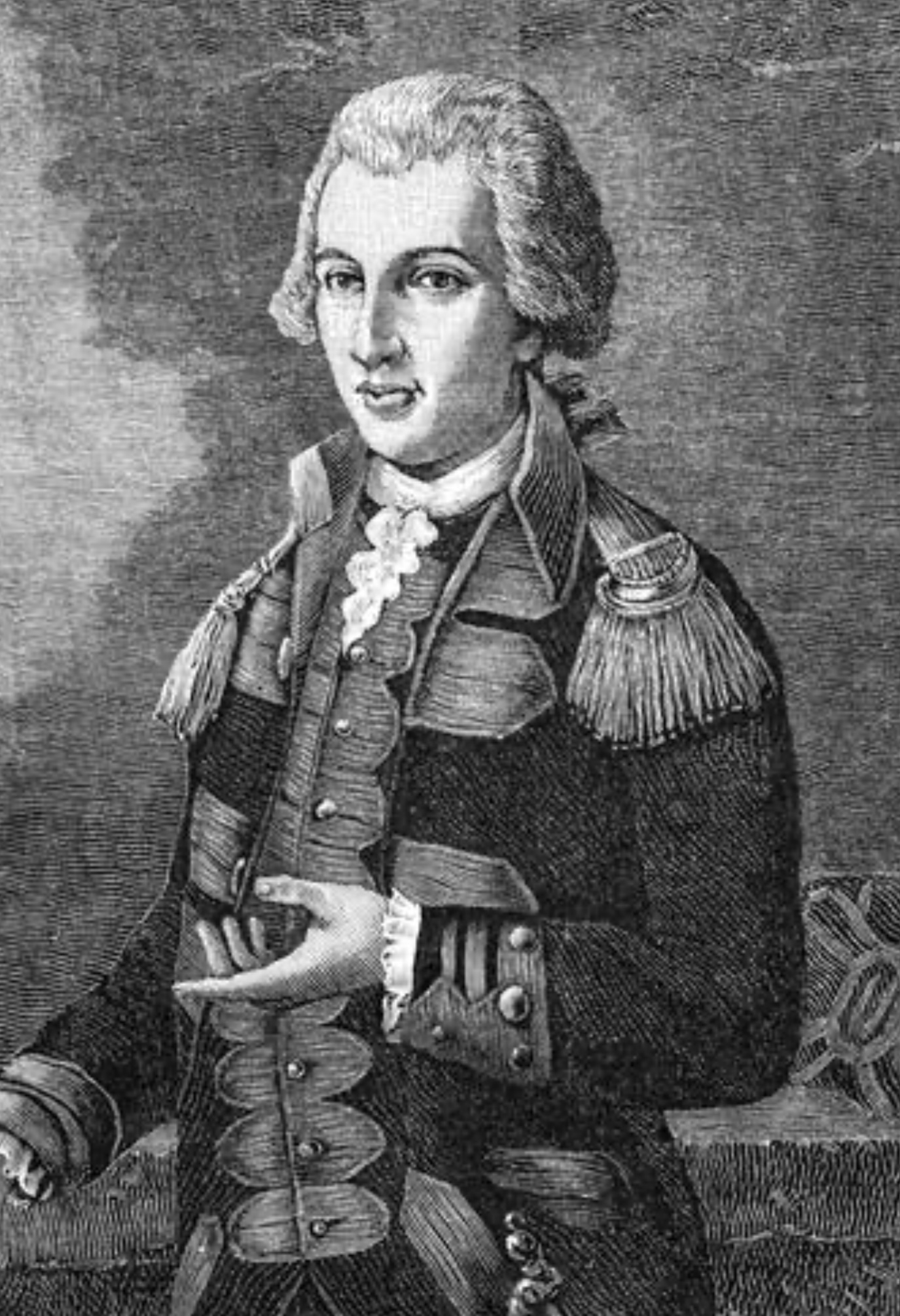
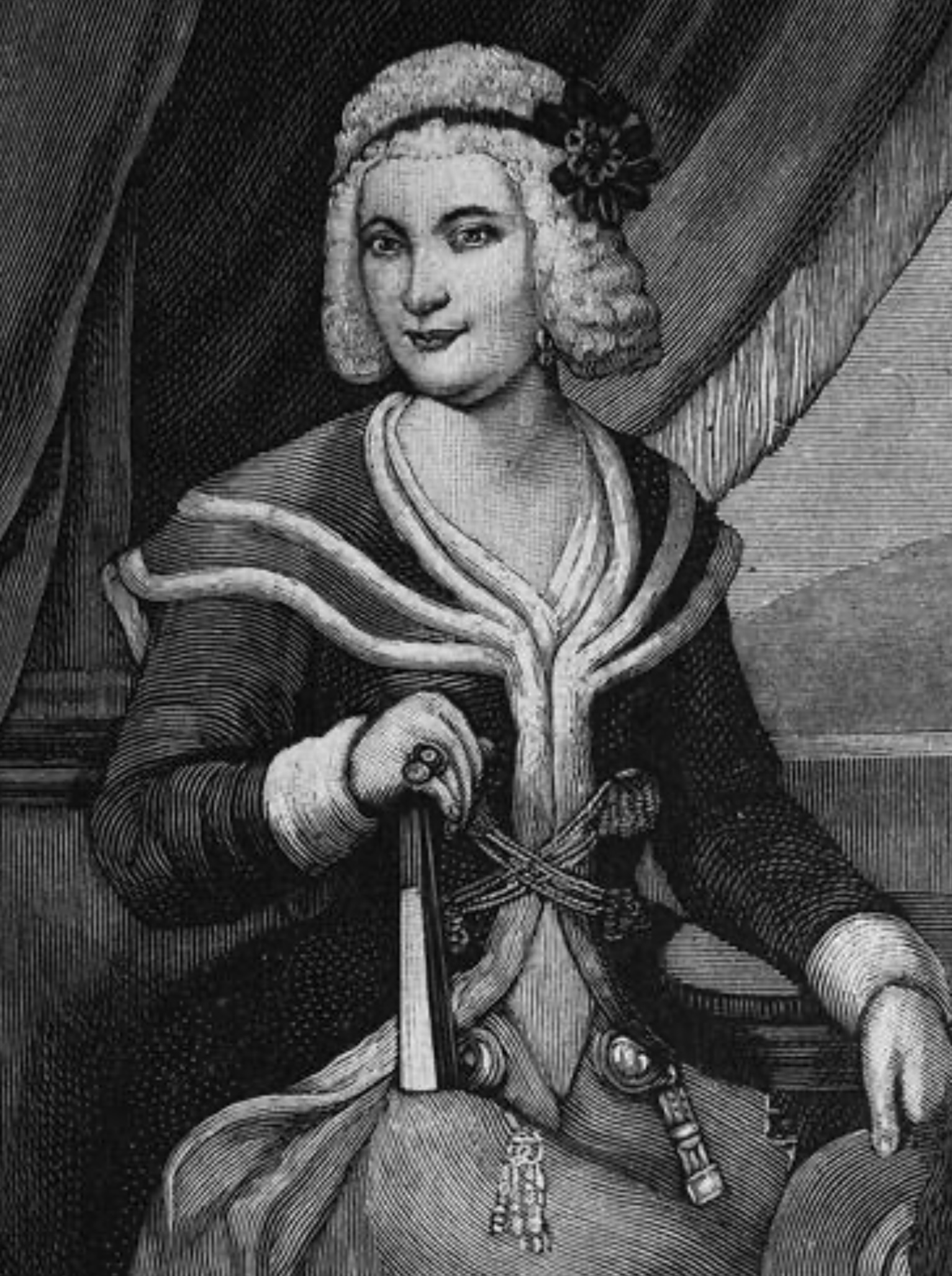
Count and Countess Pecci, parents

His siblings were:

- Carlo (1793–1879)
- Anna Maria (1798–1870)
- Caterina (1800–1867)
- Giovanni Battista (1802–1881)
- Giuseppe (1807–1890)
- Fernando (1813–1830)

In 1824, he and Giuseppe were called to Rome, where their mother was dying. Count Pecci wanted his children near him after the loss of his wife and so they stayed with him in Rome and attended the Jesuit Collegium Romanum.

In 1828, the 18-year-old Vincenzo decided in favour of secular clergy, and Giuseppe entered the Jesuit order. Vincenzo studied at the Academia dei Nobili, mainly diplomacy and law. In 1834, he gave a student presentation, attended by several cardinals, on papal judgments. For his presentation, he received awards for academic excellence and gained the attention of Vatican officials. Cardinal Secretary of State Luigi Lambruschini introduced him to Vatican congregations. During a cholera epidemic in Rome, he assisted Cardinal Giuseppe Antonio Sala in his duties as overseer of all the city hospitals. In 1836, he received his doctorate in theology and doctorates of civil and Canon Law in Rome.

== Provincial administrator (1837–1843) ==
On 14 February 1837, Pope Gregory XVI appointed the 27-year-old Pecci as personal prelate even before he was ordained a priest on 31 December 1837 by the Cardinal Vicar Carlo Odescalchi. He celebrated his first Mass with his priest brother Giuseppe. Shortly thereafter, Gregory XVI appointed Pecci as Papal legate (provincial administrator) to Benevento, the smallest Papal province, with a population of about 20,000.

The main problems facing Pecci were a decaying local economy, insecurity from widespread bandits, and pervasive Mafia or Camorra structures, which were often allied with aristocratic families. Pecci arrested the most powerful aristocrat in Benevento his troops captured others, who were either killed or imprisoned by him. With public order restored, he turned to the economy and a reform of the tax system to stimulate trade with the neighboring provinces.

Pecci was first destined for Spoleto, a province of 100,000. On 17 July 1841, he was sent to Perugia with 200,000 inhabitants. His immediate concern was to prepare the province for a papal visitation in the same year. Pope Gregory XVI visited hospitals and educational institutions for several days, asking for advice and listing questions. The fight against corruption continued in Perugia, where Pecci investigated several incidents. When it was claimed that a bakery was selling bread below the prescribed pound weight, he personally went there, had all bread weighed and confiscated it if below legal weight. The confiscated bread was distributed to the poor.

== Nuncio to Belgium (1843–1846) ==
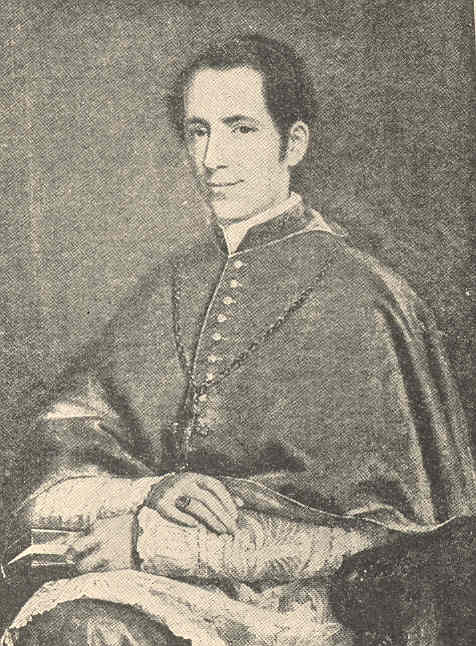
Archbishop Pecci as Nuncio in Brussels

In 1843, Pecci, at only 33, was appointed Apostolic Nuncio to Belgium, a position that guaranteed the cardinal's hat after completion of the tour.

On 27 April 1843, Pope Gregory XVI appointed Pecci Archbishop and asked his Cardinal Secretary of State Lambruschini to consecrate him. Pecci developed excellent relations with the royal family and used the location to visit neighboring Germany, where he was particularly interested in the architectural completion of the Cologne Cathedral.

In 1844, upon his initiative, a Belgian College in Rome was opened; 102 years later, in 1946, the future Pope John Paul II would begin his Roman studies there. Pecci spent several weeks in England with Bishop Nicholas Wiseman, carefully reviewing the condition of the Catholic Church in that country.

In Belgium, the school question was sharply debated between the Catholic majority and the liberal minority. Pecci encouraged the struggle for Catholic schools, but he was able to win the good will of the Court not only of the pious Queen Louise but also of King Leopold I, who was strongly liberal in his views. The new nuncio succeeded in uniting Catholics. At the end of his mission, the King granted him the Grand Cordon in the Order of Leopold.

== Archbishop-Bishop of Perugia (1846–1878) ==
=== Papal assistant ===
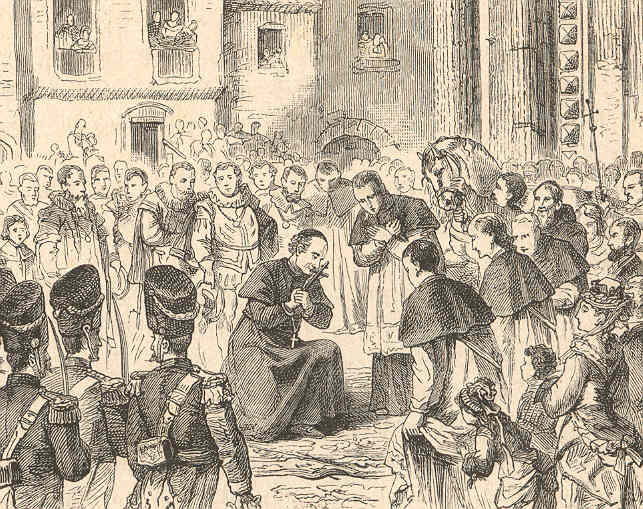
Archbishop Pecci enters Perugia in 1846.

In 1843, Pecci had been named papal assistant. From 1846 to 1877, he was considered a popular and successful Archbishop of Perugia. In 1847, after Pope Pius IX granted unlimited freedom for the press in the Papal States, Pecci, who had been highly popular in the first years of his episcopate, became the object of attacks in the media and at his residence. In 1848, revolutionary movements developed throughout Western Europe, including France, Germany and Italy. Austrian, French and Spanish troops reversed the revolutionary gains but at a price for Pecci and the Catholic Church, who could not regain their former popularity.

=== Provincial council ===
Pecci called a provincial council in 1849 to reform the religious life in his dioceses in Spoleto and it was in this council that the need for a Syllabus of Errors was discussed. He invested in enlarging the seminary for future priests and in hiring new and prominent professors, preferably Thomists. He called on his brother Giuseppe Pecci, a noted Thomist scholar, to resign his professorship in Rome and to teach in Perugia instead. His own residence was next to the seminary, which facilitated his daily contacts with the students.

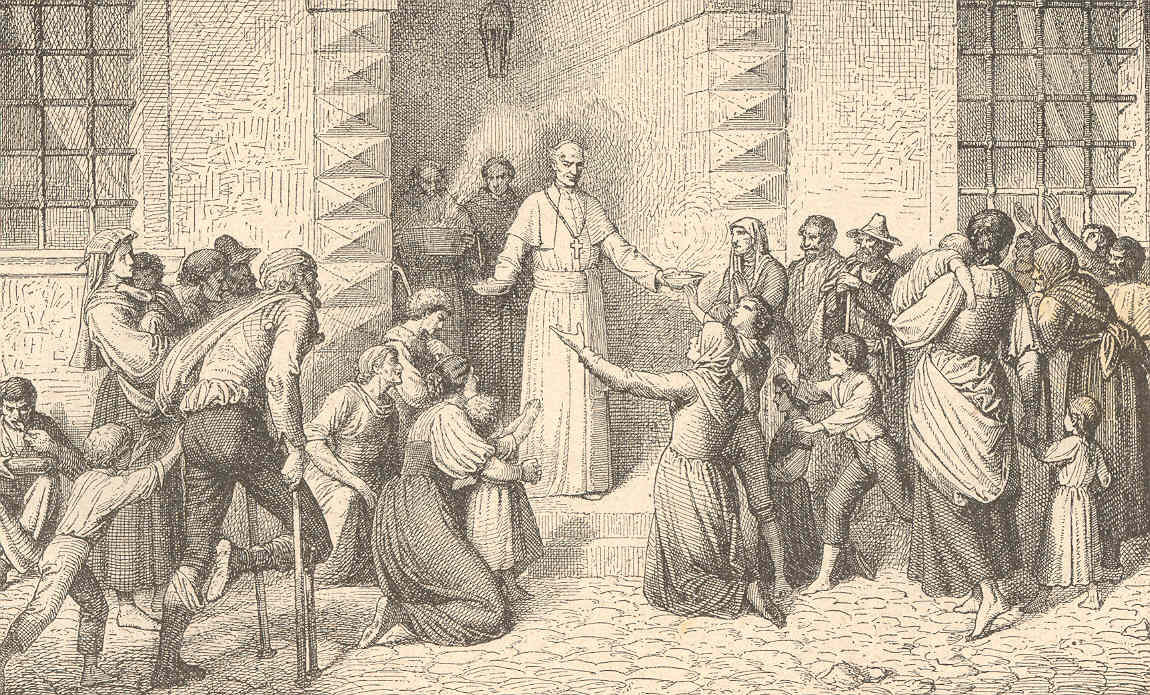
Archbishop Pecci aids the poor in Perugia.

=== Charitable activities ===
While archbishop, Pecci developed several activities in support of various Catholic charities. He founded homeless shelters for boys, girls and elderly women. Throughout his dioceses, he opened branches of a Bank, Monte di Pietà, which focused on low-income people and provided low-interest loans. He created soup kitchens, which were run by the Capuchins. Upon his elevation to the cardinalate in late 1853, and in light of continuing earthquakes and floods, he donated all resources for the festivities of his elevation to the victims. Much of the public attention turned on the conflict between the Papal States and Italian nationalism, which aimed at the Papal States' annihilation to achieve the Unification of Italy.

=== Cardinalate ===
In the consistory of 19 December 1853, he was elevated to the College of Cardinals, as Cardinal-Priest of San Crisogono. Pope Gregory XVI originally intended to name him as a cardinal; however, his death in 1846 put pause to that idea while the events that characterized the beginning of the papacy of Pius IX further postponed the idea of Pecci's elevation. By the time that Gregory XVI died, Leopold II repeatedly asked that Pecci be named as a cardinal. While Pius IX strongly desired having Pecci as close to Rome as possible, and repeatedly offered him a suburbicarian diocese, Pecci continually refused due to his preference for Perugia. It is possible that the archbishop did not share the views of the Cardinal Secretary of State, Giacomo Antonelli. It is not true that Pius IX deliberately sent him to Perugia as a way of exiling him from Rome simply because Pecci's views were perceived to be liberalistic and conciliatory, as opposed to the conservatism of the papal court.

Allegedly, Pecci had been a cardinal reserved "in pectore" by Gregory XVI in the consistory of 19 January 1846, with the pope's death just over four months later invalidating the appointment since his name was never actually revealed publicly.

==== Defending the papacy ====
Pecci defended the papacy and its claims. When Italian authorities expropriated convents and monasteries of Catholic orders, turning them into administration or military buildings, Pecci protested but acted moderately. When the Italian state took over Catholic schools, Pecci, fearing for his theological seminary, simply added all secular topics from other schools and opened the seminary to non-theologians. The new government also levied taxes on the Catholic Church and issued legislation according to which all episcopal or papal utterances were to be approved by the government before their publication.

==== Organization of the First Vatican Council ====
On 8 December 1869, an ecumenical council, which became known as the First Vatican Council, was to take place in the Vatican per Pope Pius IX. Pecci was likely well informed since the pope named his brother Giuseppe to help prepare the event.

During the 1870s, in his last years in Perugia, Pecci addressed the role of the church in modern society several times, defining the church as the mother of material civilization because it upheld human dignity of working people, opposed the excesses of industrialization, and developed large-scale charities for the needy.

In August 1877, on the death of Cardinal Filippo de Angelis, Pope Pius IX appointed him Camerlengo, which required him to reside in Rome. Reportedly, Pius IX is alleged to have said to Pecci: "Monsignor, I have decided to summon you to the Senate of the Church. I feel sure this will be the first act of my pontificate that you will not feel called upon to criticize." These comments were reported to have been said due to the stories that Pecci and Pius IX had a mutual animosity for each other and disagreed with each other in terms of policy; however, this purported animosity has never been proven. It was further alleged that by this stage Pecci desired a change of scenery from Perugia and hoped for either the bishopric of Albano or the position of datary of the Apostolic Dataria. It has also been said that Pecci was reportedly in line to succeed Cardinal Alessandro Barnabò as the prefect for Propaganda Fide; however, it was stymied by his opponent, Cardinal Antonelli.

== Papacy (1878–1903) ==
=== Election ===
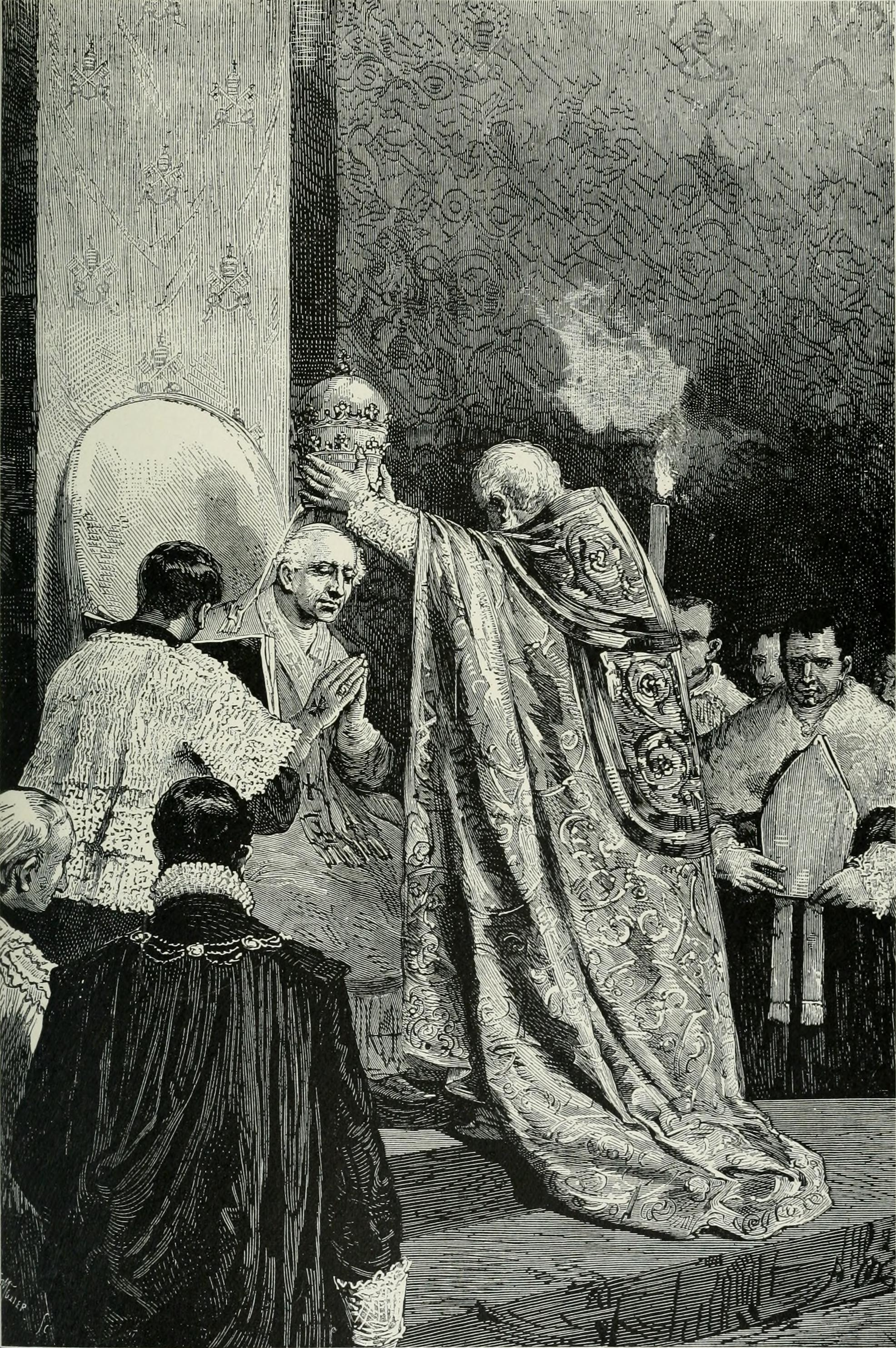
Depiction of Leo XIII's papal coronation, c. 1900

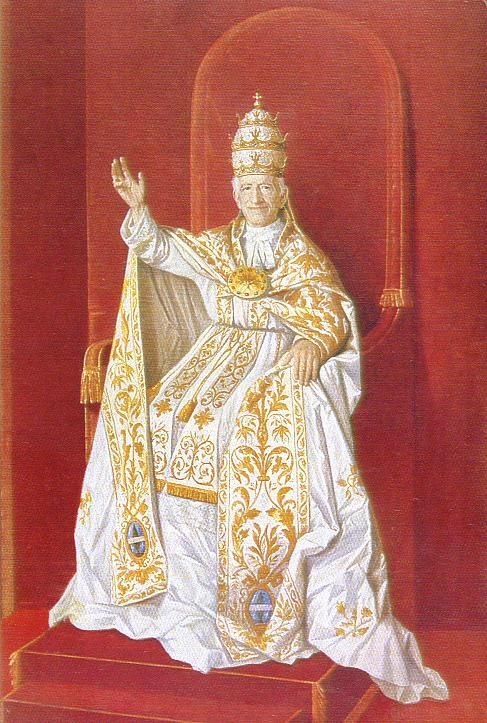
Portrait depiction of Leo XIII's papal coronation. He is wearing a papal tiara.

Pope Pius IX died on 7 February 1878. In the conclave, the cardinals faced varied questions and discussed issues like church–state relations in Europe, specifically Italy; divisions in the church; and the status of the First Vatican Council. It was also debated that the conclave be moved elsewhere, but Pecci decided otherwise in his capacity as the camerlengo. On 18 February 1878, the conclave assembled in Rome. Cardinal Pecci was elected on the third ballot and chose the name Leo XIII. He was crowned on 3 March 1878.

During the conclave, he secured his election on the third scrutiny with 44 out of 61 votes, more than the requisite two-thirds majority. While the 1878 conclave was characterized by fewer political influences than in previous conclaves due to a variety of European political crises, it was generally believed that the long papacy of the conservative Pius IX led many of the cardinals to vote for Pecci because his age and health created the expectation that his papacy would be somewhat brief. Following the conclave, John Henry Newman is reported to have said: "In the successor of Pius I recognize a depth of thought, a tenderness of heart, a winning simplicity, and a power answering to the name of Leo, which prevent me from lamenting that Pius is no longer here." In the conclave, Pecci was perceived as the main "papabile" candidate; however, Cardinals Flavio Chigi and Tommaso Martinelli were also considered as potential candidates. But some cardinals who opposed Pecci, and were alarmed at the rising votes he was securing, banded together to cast their ballots for Cardinal Alessandro Franchi; however, Franchi secured no votes in the final ballot that saw Pecci duly elected. Allegedly, those who were dedicated to thwarting his election were Cardinals Luigi Oreglia di Santo Stefano, Pietro Giannelli, Chigi, Lorenzo Ilarione Randi, Carlo Sacconi, Raffaele Monaco La Valletta, Luigi Amat di San Filippo e Sorso, and Johann Baptist Franzelin. It was also suggested that, before his death, Pius IX heavily favored Cardinal Luigi Bilio to succeed him, and while many of the cardinals created by the late pope intended to vote for Bilio to honor the man who elevated them in the first place, they feared that voting for an ultra-conservative could potentially evoke a veto from one of the European powers and stall the election more than was necessary. To that end, there had been early talks about Austria possibly vetoing Bilio; however, this never occurred. Before the conclave, Cardinals Domenico Bartolini, Monaco, Bilio, Henry Edward Manning, Lorenzo Nina, and Franchi (proposed by Pecci's opponents) all agreed on supporting Pecci's candidacy, also determining that the next pope needed to be an Italian. Both Manning and Edward Henry Howard agreed to persuade the foreign cardinals to back Pecci's candidacy.

Upon his election, he announced that he would assume the name "Leo" in memory of Pope Leo XII due to his admiration for the late pope's interest in education and his conciliatory attitude toward foreign governments. When asked what name he would take, the new pope responded: "As Leo XIII, in remembrance of Leo XII, whom I have always venerated". His election was formally announced to the people of Rome and the world at 1:15 pm.

He retained the administration of the Perugia see until 1880.

=== Pontificate ===
As soon as he was elected to the papacy, Leo XIII worked to encourage understanding between the church and the modern world. When he firmly reasserted the scholastic doctrine that science and religion coexist, he required the study of Thomas Aquinas and opened the Vatican Secret Archives to qualified researchers, among whom was the noted historian of the Papacy Ludwig von Pastor. He also refounded the Vatican Observatory "so that everyone might see clearly that the Church and her Pastors are not opposed to true and solid science, whether human or divine, but that they embrace it, encourage it, and promote it with the fullest possible devotion."

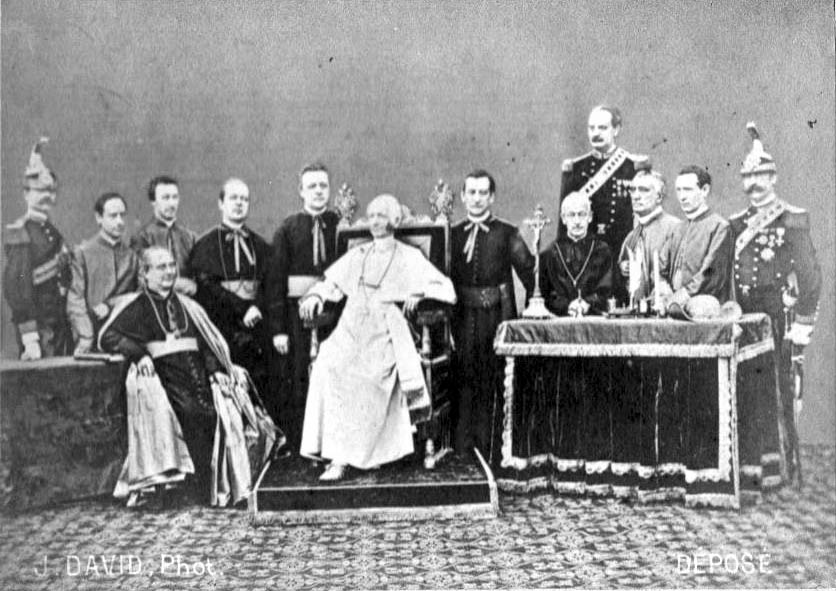
Pope Leo XIII and his inner court at the Vatican, photographed by Jules David in June 1878

Leo XIII brought normality back to the Catholic Church after the tumultuous years of Pius IX. Leo's intellectual and diplomatic skills helped regain much of the prestige lost with the fall of the Papal States. He tried to reconcile the church with the working class, particularly by dealing with the social changes that were sweeping Europe. The new economic order had resulted in the growth of an impoverished working class who had increasing anticlerical and socialist sympathies. Leo helped reverse that trend.

Although Leo XIII was no radical in either theology or politics, his papacy moved the Catholic Church back to the mainstream of European life. Considered a great diplomat, he managed to improve relations with Russia, Germany, France, Britain and other countries.

Pope Leo XIII was able to reach several agreements in 1896 that resulted in better conditions for the faithful and additional appointments of bishops. During the fifth cholera pandemic in 1891, he ordered the construction of a hospice inside the Vatican. That building would be torn down in 1996 to make way for construction of the Domus Sanctae Marthae.

Leo was a drinker of the cocaine-infused wine tonic Vin Mariani, a precursor drink to Coca-Cola. He awarded a Vatican gold medal to the wine's creator, Angelo Mariani, and also appeared on a poster endorsing it. Leo XIII was a semi-vegetarian. In 1903, he attributed his longevity to the sparing use of meat and the consumption of eggs, milk and vegetables.

His favourite poets were Virgil and Dante.

=== Foreign relations ===
During the Papacy of Leo XIII, the Holy See sought to regain international standing (following the loss of the Papal States) by positioning itself as an arbiter of international disputes.

Leo XIII prioritized common interests between the Holy See and the European colonial powers, tacitly supporting ecclesiastical colonization of Church missions along national lines.

==== Russia ====
Pope Leo XIII began his pontificate with a friendly letter to Tsar Alexander II in which he reminded the Russian monarch of the millions of Catholics living in his empire who would like to be good Russian subjects if their dignity were respected.

After the assassination of Alexander II, the pope sent a high ranking representative to the coronation of his successor, Alexander III, who was grateful and asked for all religious forces to unify. He asked the pope to ensure that his bishops abstain from political agitation. Relations improved further when Pope Leo XIII, because of Italian considerations, distanced the Vatican from the Rome-Vienna-Berlin alliance, and helped to facilitate a rapprochement between Paris and St. Petersburg.

==== Germany ====
Under Otto von Bismarck, the anti-Catholic Kulturkampf in Prussia led to significant restrictions on the Catholic Church in the German Empire, including the Jesuits Law of 1872. During Leo's papacy, compromises were informally reached and the anti-Catholic attacks subsided.

The Centre Party in Germany represented Catholic interests and was a force for social change. It was encouraged by Leo's support for social welfare legislation and the rights of working people. Leo's forward-looking approach encouraged Catholic Action in other European countries, where the social teachings of the church were incorporated into the agenda of Catholic parties, particularly the Christian democratic parties, which became an acceptable alternative to socialist parties. Leo's social teachings were reiterated throughout the 20th century by his successors.

In his Memoirs, Emperor Wilhelm II discussed the "friendly, trustful relationship that existed between me and Pope Leo XIII." During Wilhelm's third visit to Leo: "It was of interest to me that the Pope said on this occasion that Germany must be the sword of the Catholic Church. I remarked that the old Roman Empire of the German nation no longer existed, and that conditions had changed. But he adhered to his words."

==== France ====
Leo XIII possessed a great affection for France, and feared that the Third Republic would take advantage of the fact that most French Catholics were Royalists to abolish the Concordat of 1801. At the advisement of Cardinal Rampolla, he urged French Catholics to "rally" to the republic. Leo's decision upset many French monarchists, who felt they were being forced to betray their king for their faith. Ultimately, this move split the French Church politically and decreased its influence in France. Leo's move also failed to prevent the Concordat's eventual repealment, as it was abrogated after his death by the 1905 French law on the Separation of the Churches and the State.

==== Italy ====
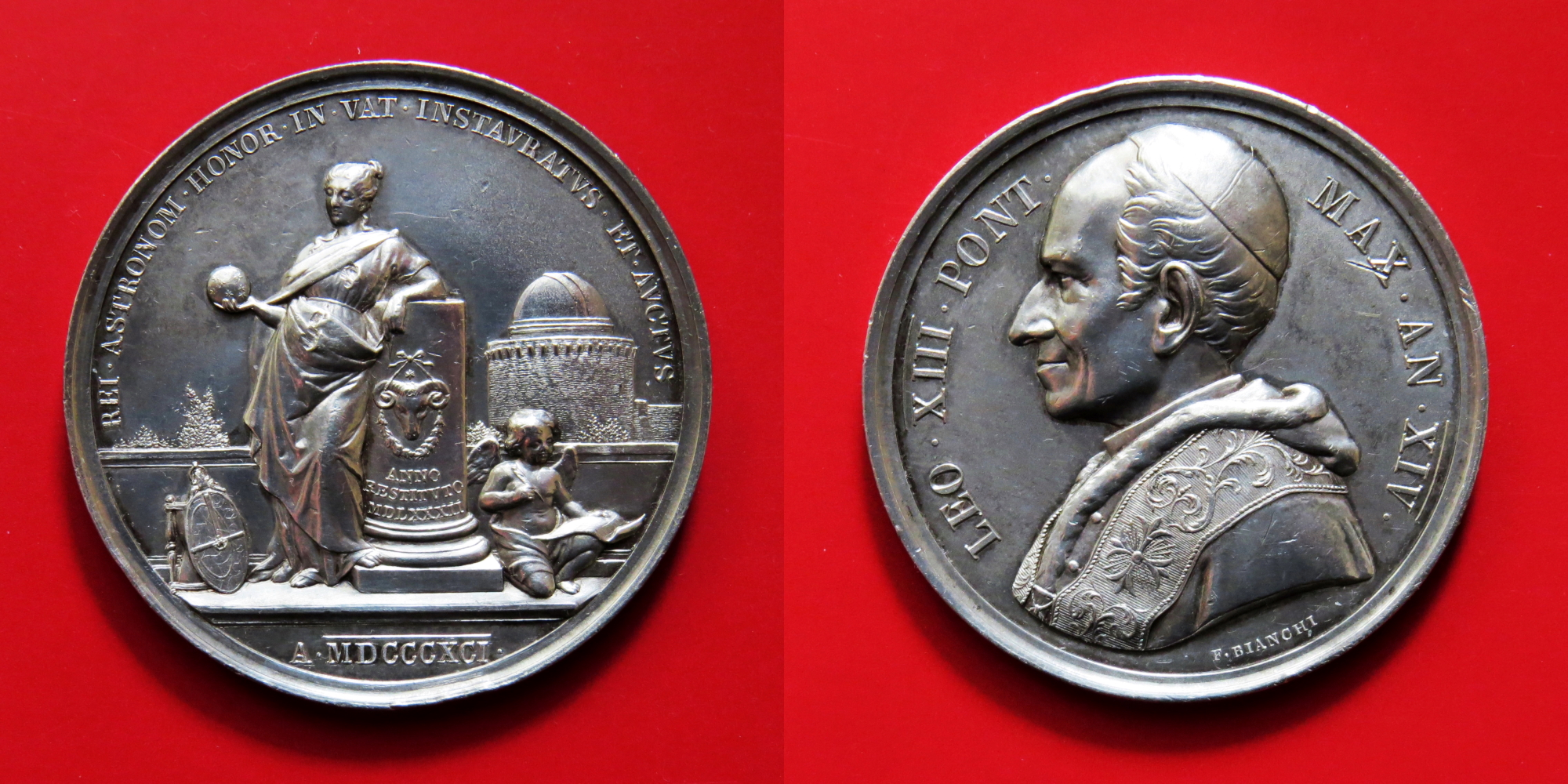
Silver medal celebrating Pope Leo XIII's 1891 inauguration of the new observatory

In the light of a climate hostile to the Catholic Church, Leo continued the policies of Pius IX towards Italy without major modifications. In his relations with the Italian state, Leo continued the Papacy's self-imposed incarceration-in-the-Vatican stance and continued to insist that Italian Catholics should not vote in Italian elections or hold any elected office. In his first consistory in 1879, he elevated his older brother, Giuseppe, to the cardinalate. He had to defend the freedom of the church against what Catholics considered Italian persecution and discrimination in the area of education, expropriation and violation of Catholic Churches, legal measures against the church and acts of terrorism such as anticlerical groups attempting to throw the corpse of Pope Pius IX into the Tiber on 13 July 1881. The pope even considered moving his residence to Trieste or Salzburg, two cities in Austria, an idea that Emperor Franz Joseph I gently rejected.

==== United Kingdom ====
Among the activities of Leo XIII that were important for the English-speaking world, he restored the Scottish hierarchy in 1878. The following year, on 12 May 1879, he raised to the rank of cardinal the convert theologian John Henry Newman, who would eventually be beatified by Pope Benedict XVI in 2010 and canonized by Pope Francis in 2019. In British India, too, Leo established a Catholic hierarchy in 1886 and regulated some longstanding conflicts with the Portuguese authorities. A papal rescript (20 April 1888) condemned the Irish Plan of Campaign and all clerical involvement in it as well as boycotting, followed in June by the papal encyclical "Saepe Nos" that was addressed to all the Irish bishops. Of outstanding significance, not least for the English-speaking world, was Leo's encyclical Apostolicae curae on the invalidity of the Anglican orders, published in 1896. In 1899, he declared the Venerable Bede a Doctor of the Church.

==== Spain ====
In 1880, the Santa Maria de Montserrat Abbey in Catalonia celebrated 1000 years of existence. On 11 September 1881, to coincide with the Catalan national day, Leo XIII proclaimed the Virgin of Montserrat to be Patron of Catalonia. This had implications beyond the purely religious sphere, influencing the development of Catalan nationalism.

==== Bulgaria ====
Leo XIII welcomed the elevation of Prince Ferdinand of Saxe-Coburg (the later Ferdinand I of Bulgaria) to Prince of Bulgaria in 1886. A fellow Catholic, whose wife was a member of the Italian House of Bourbon-Parma, the two had a lot in common. However, relations between the two degenerated when Ferdinand expressed his intention to allow his eldest son Crown Prince Boris (later Tsar Boris III) to convert to Orthodoxy, the majority religion of Bulgaria. Leo strongly condemned the action, and when Ferdinand went through with the conversion anyway, Leo excommunicated him.

==== United States ====
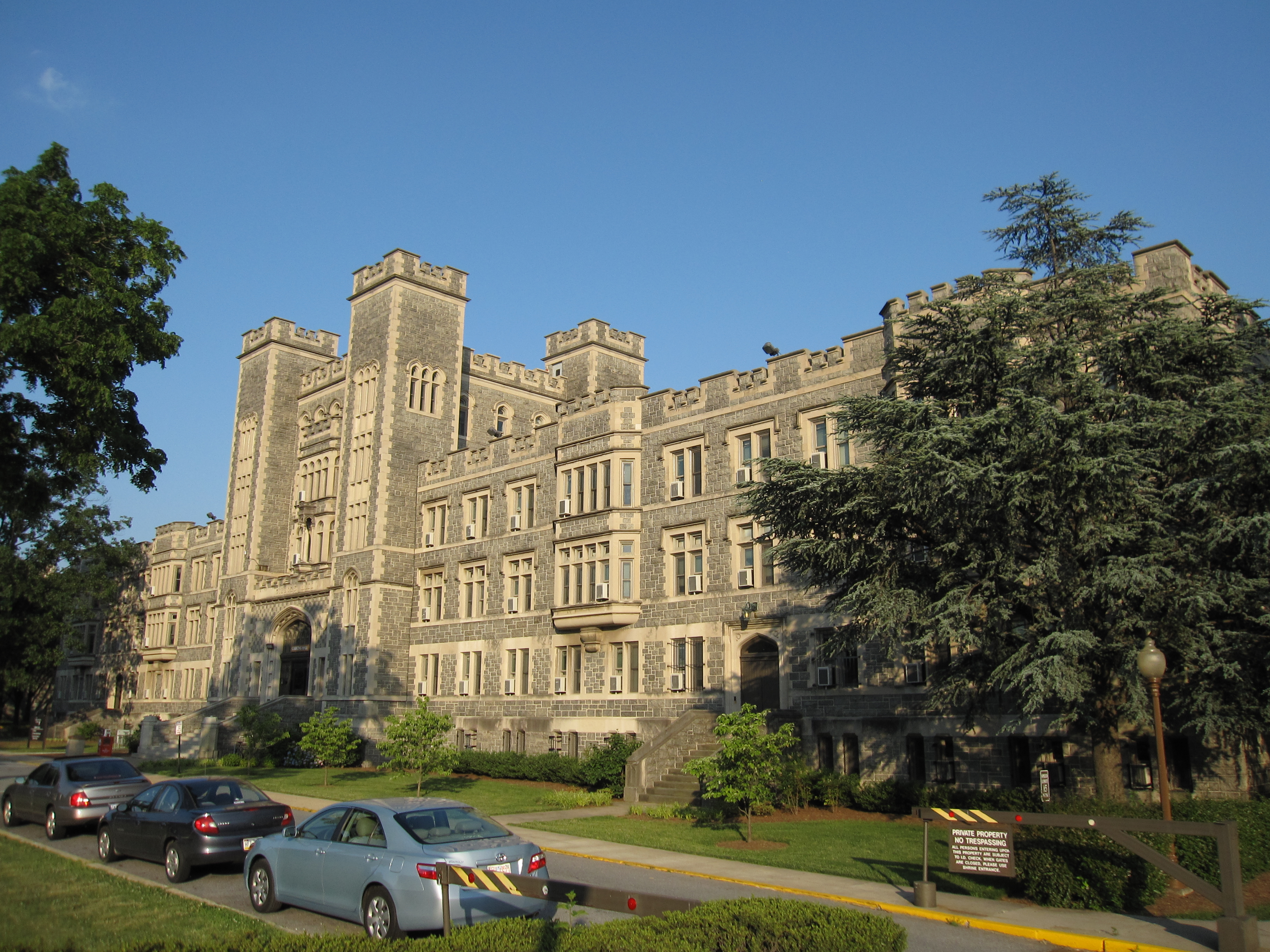
In 1889, Pope Leo XIII authorized the founding of Catholic University of America in Washington, D.C., and granted it Papal degrees in theology.

The United States frequently attracted his attention and admiration. He confirmed the decrees of the Third Plenary Council of Baltimore (1884) and raised James Gibbons, the archbishop of that city, to the cardinalate in 1886.

On 10 April 1887, a pontifical charter from Pope Leo XIII founded the Catholic University of America, establishing the national university of the Catholic Church in the United States.

American newspapers criticized Pope Leo because they claimed that he was attempting to gain control of American public schools. One cartoonist drew Leo as a fox unable to reach grapes that were labeled for American schools; the caption read "Sour grapes!"

In 1892, Pope Leo XIII opened the Vatican archives to William Eleroy Curtis, a special envoy planning the commemoration of Christopher Columbus at the 1893 World's Columbian Exposition.

==== Brazil ====
Pope Leo XIII is remembered for the First Plenary Council of Latin America held at Rome in 1899, and for his encyclical of 1888 to the bishops of Brazil, In plurimis, on the abolition of slavery. In 1897 he published the Apostolic Letter Trans Oceanum, which dealt with the privileges and ecclesiastical structure of the Catholic Church in Latin America.

==== Chile ====
He bestowed his pontifical benediction over Chilean troops on the eve of the Battle of Chorrillos during the War of the Pacific in January 1881. The Chilean soldiers looted the cities of Chorrillos and Barranco, including the churches, and their chaplains headed the robbery at the Biblioteca Nacional del Perú, where the soldiers ransacked various items along with much capital, and Chilean priests coveted rare and ancient editions of the Bible that were stored there.

==== China ====
Leo XIII attempted to establish bilateral relations with China in the 1880s. France, which had asserted its religious protectorate in China following the unequal treaties, blocked these attempts by threatening the Holy See that France would withdraw its own ambassador to the Holy See and apply punitive measures against the Catholic Church in France. The Holy See acquiesced. According to Leo XIII, the failure to establish relations with China was "the greatest sorrow of [his] pontificate."

==== India ====
Pope Leo XIII urged "Filii tui India, administri tibi salutis" (Your own sons, O India, will be the heralds of your salvation) and founded the national seminary, called the Papal Seminary. He entrusted this task to the then Apostolic Delegate to India Ladislaus Michael Zaleski, who founded the Seminary in 1893.

==== Philippines ====
Leo XIII was pope during the Spanish–American War in 1898, in which the United States, a then largely Protestant nation, took control of the Philippines from Spain. In a 1902 meeting with the American Governor-General William Howard Taft, Leo XIII refused to allow the United States government to buy land from Catholic friars in the Philippines.

==== Evangelization ====
Pope Leo XIII sanctioned the missions to Eastern Africa beginning in 1884. In 1887, he approved the foundation of Missionaries of St. Charles Borromeo, which were organized by the Bishop of Piacenza, Giovanni Battista Scalabrini. The missionaries were sent to North and South America to do pastoral care for Italian immigrants. In 1879 Catholic missionaries associated with the White Father Congregation (Society of the Missionaries of Africa) came to Uganda and others went to Tanganyika (present-day Tanzania) and Rwanda.

== Theology ==
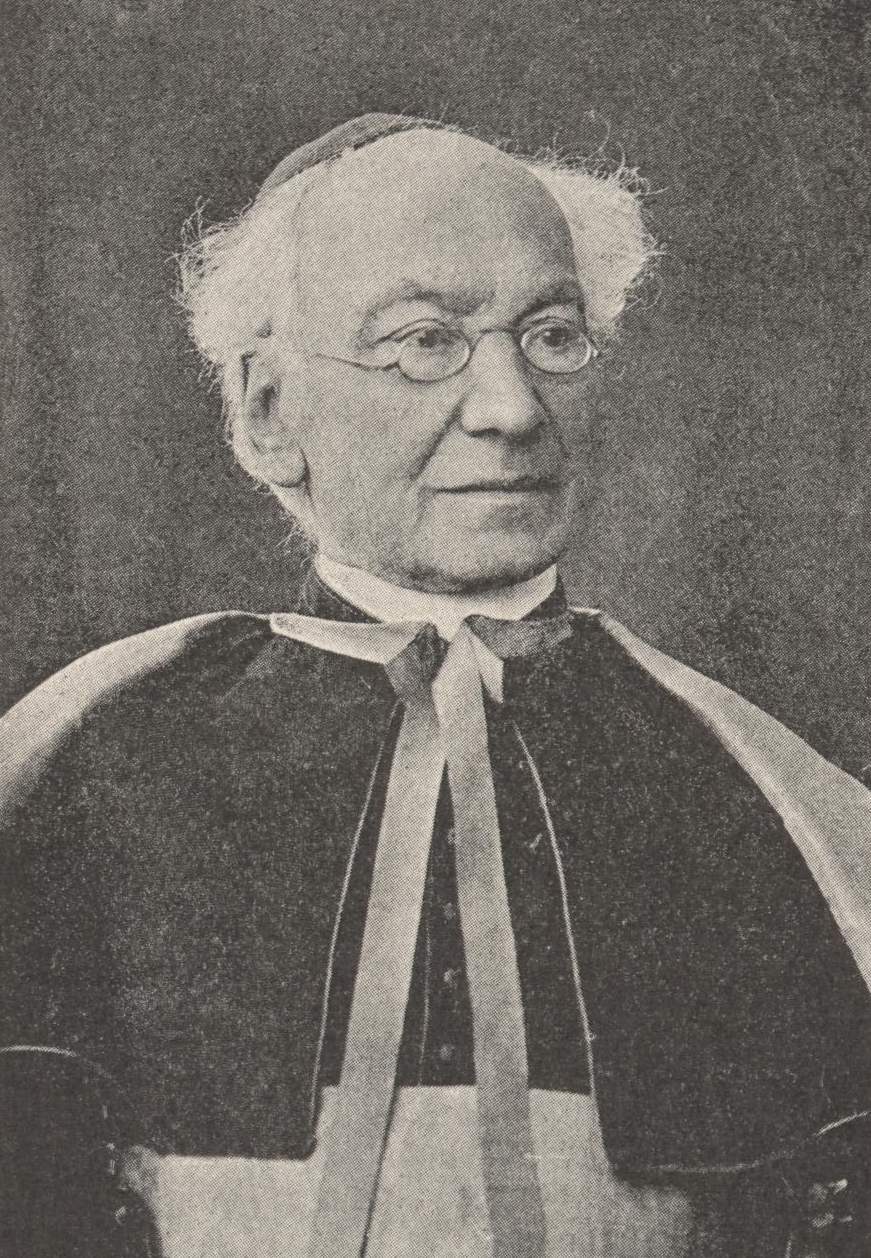
Giuseppe Pecci in 1887. At the urgent requests of the College of Cardinals, Leo XIII in 1879 elevated his brother, Giuseppe Pecci, a Jesuit and prominent Thomist theologian, into their ranks.

Leo XIII also approved a number of Scapulars. In 1885, he approved the Scapular of the Holy Face, (also known as The Veronica) and elevated the Priests of the Holy Face to an archconfraternity. He also approved the Scapular of Our Lady of Good Counsel and the Scapular of St. Joseph, both in 1893, and the Scapular of the Sacred Heart in 1900.

=== Thomism ===
As pope, he used all his authority for a revival of the theology of Thomas Aquinas. On 4 August 1879, Leo XIII promulgated the encyclical Aeterni Patris ("Eternal Father") — which, more than any other single document, provided a charter for the revival of Thomism, the medieval theological system based on the thought of Aquinas – as the official philosophical and theological system of the Catholic Church. It was to be normative not only in the training of priests but also in the education of the laity at universities.

Pope Leo XIII later created the Pontifical Academy of St. Thomas Aquinas on 15 October 1879 and ordered the publication of the critical edition, the so-called Leonine Edition, of the complete works of the doctor angelicus. The superintendence of the Leonine edition was entrusted to Tommaso Maria Zigliara, professor and rector of the Collegium Divi Thomae de Urbe, the future Pontifical University of Saint Thomas Aquinas, today called Angelicum. Leo also founded the Angelicum's Faculty of Philosophy in 1882 and its Faculty of Canon Law in 1896.

=== Freemasonry ===
Leo XIII was a prominent critic of Freemasonry. In the 1884 encyclical Humanum genus, he reaffirmed earlier papal condemnations of Masonic organizations and argued that their principles were incompatible with Catholic doctrine. The encyclical argued Freemasonry was a leading force behind secularism, religious indifferentism, and efforts to diminish the influence of Christianity in public life. Leo returned to the subject in several subsequent documents, making his criticism of Freemasonry a recurring theme of his pontificate.

=== Consecration of the world to the Sacred Heart ===
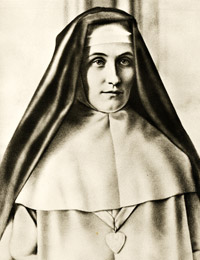
The Blessed Sister Mary of the Divine Heart was a religious sister from the Congregation of Our Lady of Charity of the Good Shepherd who asked Pope Leo XIII to consecrate the entire world to the Sacred Heart of Jesus.

Leo entered new theological territory in consecrating the world to the Sacred Heart of Jesus. After he had received many letters from Sister Mary of the Divine Heart, the countess of Droste zu Vischering and Mother Superior in the Convent of the Good Shepherd Sisters in Porto, Portugal, asking him to consecrate the entire world to the Sacred Heart of Jesus, he commissioned a group of theologians to examine the petition on the basis of revelation and sacred tradition. The outcome of this investigation was positive and so in the encyclical letter Annum sacrum (on 25 May 1899), he decreed that the consecration of the entire human race to the Sacred Heart of Jesus should take place on 11 June 1899.

The encyclical letter also encouraged the entire Catholic episcopate to promote the First Friday Devotions, established June as the Month of the Sacred Heart, and included the Prayer of Consecration to the Sacred Heart.

=== Prayer ===
Leo introduced the promotion of monthly prayer intentions in 1890, which he entrusted to the Apostleship of Prayer (now the Pope's Worldwide Prayer Network).

=== Scriptures ===
In his 1893 encyclical Providentissimus Deus, he described the importance of scriptures for theological study. It was an important encyclical for Catholic theology and its relation to the Bible, as Pope Pius XII pointed out 50 years later in his encyclical Divino afflante Spiritu.

=== Eastern Catholics ===
He devoted his encyclical Orientalium dignitas of 1894 to preserving Eastern Catholic liturgies.

=== Theological research ===
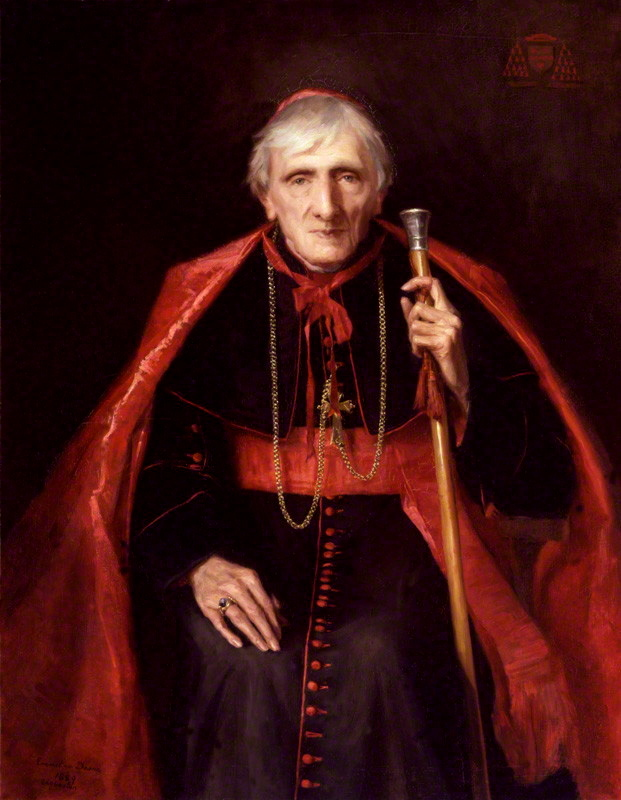
John Henry Newman was raised into the College of Cardinals by Pope Leo XIII.

Leo XIII is credited with great efforts in the areas of scientific and historical analysis. He opened the Vatican Archives and personally fostered a 20-volume comprehensive scientific study of the Papacy by Ludwig von Pastor, an Austrian historian.

=== Mariology ===
His predecessor, Pope Pius IX, became known as the Pope of the Immaculate Conception because of his dogmatization in 1854. Leo XIII, in light of his unprecedented promulgation of the rosary in 11 encyclicals, was called the Rosary Pope because he promulgated Marian devotion. In his encyclical on the 50th anniversary of the Dogma of the Immaculate Conception, he stresses Mary's role in the redemption of humanity and calls her Mediatrix and Co-Redemptrix. While allowing the title "Mediatrix", recent popes, following on the Second Vatican Council, have warned away from the term "co-redemptrix" as derogating from the one mediator, Jesus Christ.

== Social teachings ==
=== Rerum novarum ===
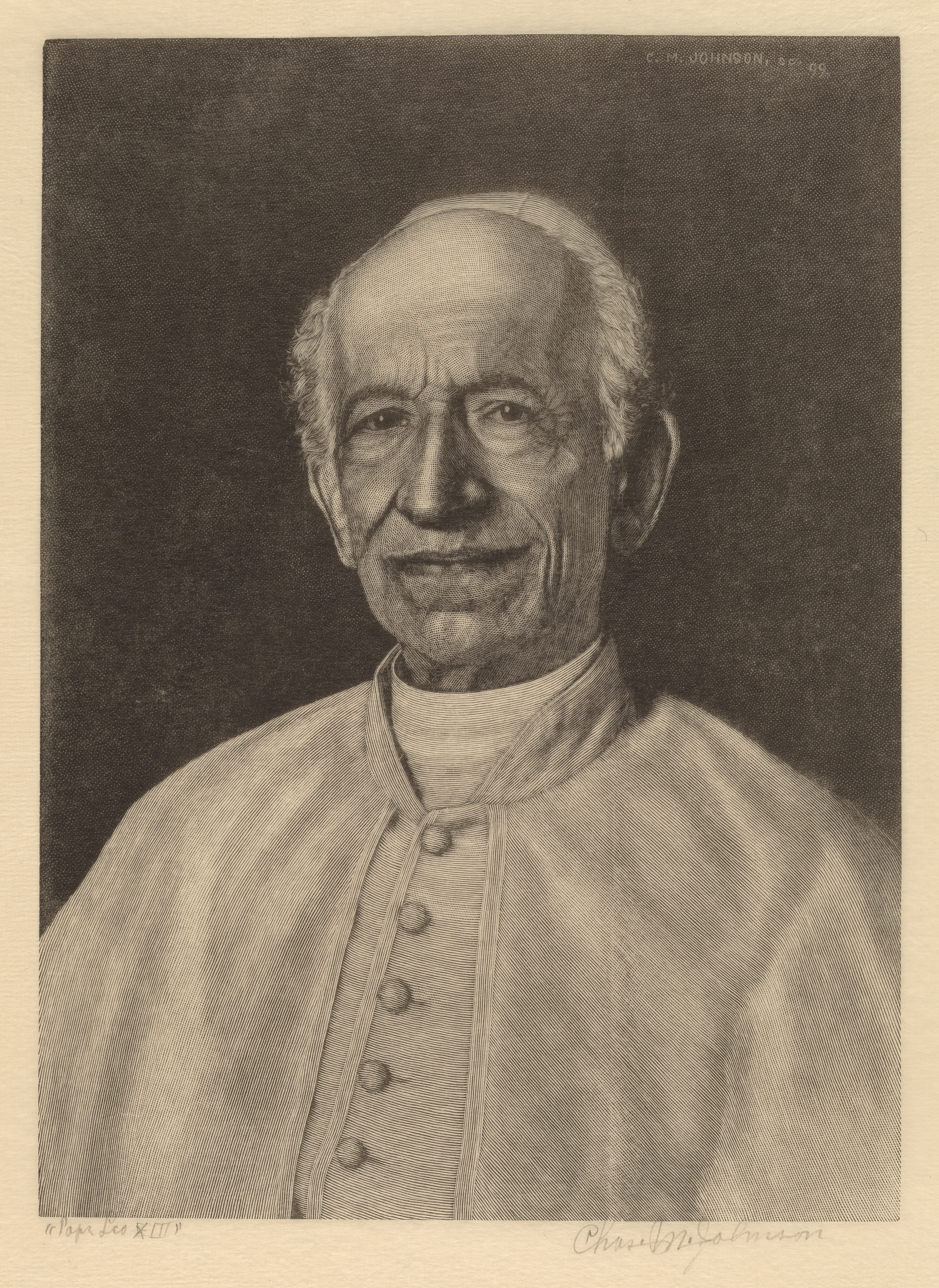
Charles M. Johnson, Pope Leo XIII, 1899, National Gallery of Art

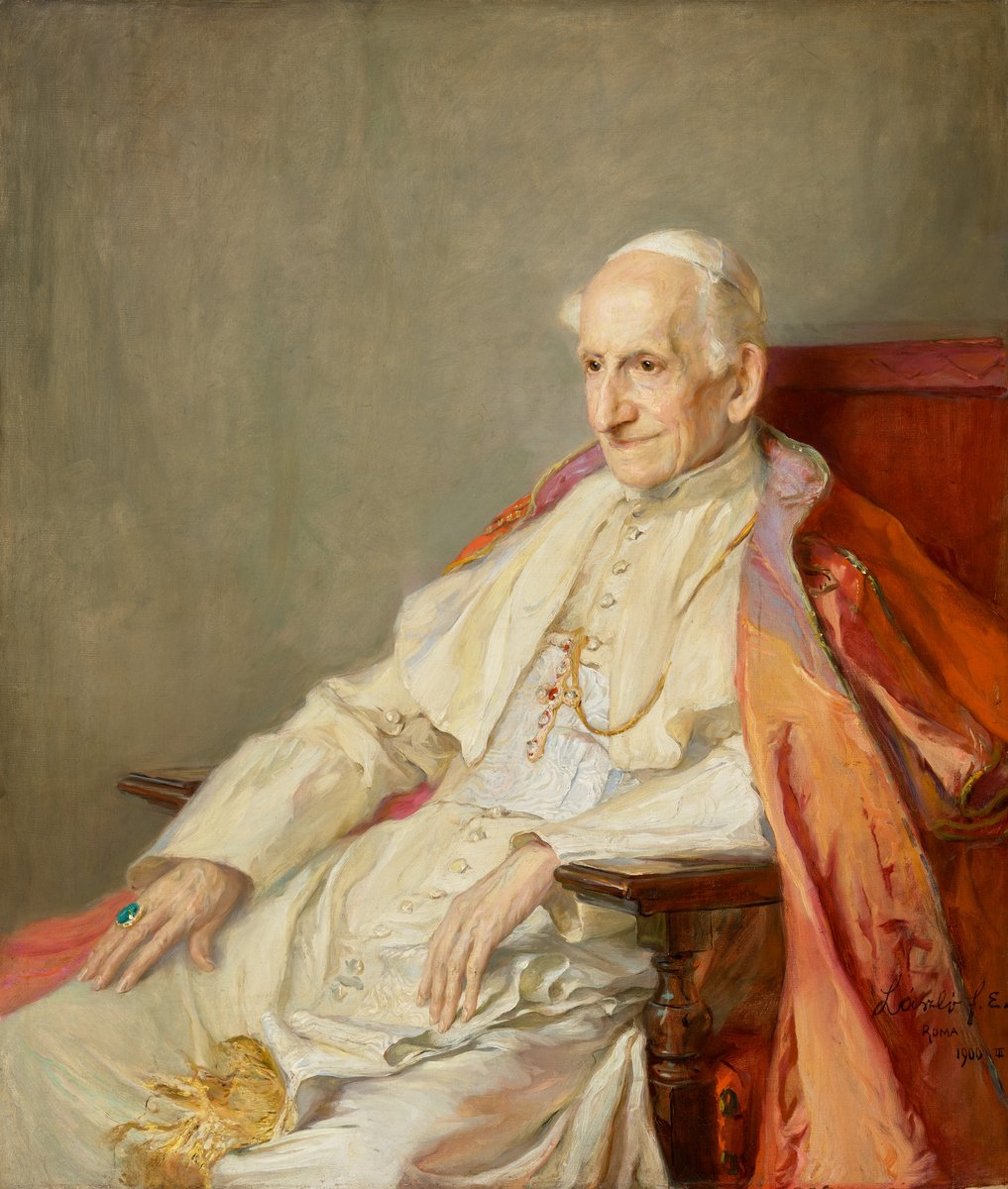
Portrait by Philip de László, 1900

His encyclicals changed the church's relations with temporal authorities; the 1891 encyclical Rerum novarum, for the first time, addressed social inequality and social justice issues with papal authority by focusing on the rights and duties of capital and labour. He was greatly influenced by Wilhelm Emmanuel von Ketteler, a German bishop who propagated siding with the suffering working classes in his book Die Arbeiterfrage und das Christentum. Since Leo XIII, many papal teachings have expanded on the rights and obligations of workers. Leo argued that both capitalism and communism are flawed. Rerum novarum introduced the idea of subsidiarity, the principle that political and social decisions should be taken at a local level, if possible, rather than by a central authority, into Catholic social thought.

== Consistories ==
Throughout his pontificate, Leo XIII elevated 147 cardinals in 27 consistories. While the limit of the College of Cardinals had been set at 70 since the papacy of Pope Sixtus V, Leo XIII never exceeded nor reached the limit, only ever coming close at 67 in 1901. Amongst the noteworthy cardinals whom he elevated, he named John Henry Newman as a cardinal while also elevating his own brother Giuseppe Pecci, though not a nepotistic act (it was based purely on recommendation and merit), in the same consistory. In 1893, he elevated Giuseppe Melchiorre Sarto to the cardinalate, who would go on to be his immediate successor, Pope Pius X in 1903. The pope also nominated the brothers, Serafino and Vincenzo Vannutelli and the cousins Luigi and Angelo Jacobini to the Sacred College. Other noteworthy inclusions were Andrea Carlo Ferrari (later beatified in 1987) and Girolamo Maria Gotti.

Of the 147 cardinals he elevated, 85 were Italian since Leo XIII nominated cardinals from beyond Europe, including the first cardinals from Australia, Canada, Slovenia, and Armenia, the latter of which would be the first Oriental selection since 1439.

In 1880, the pope named three cardinals "in pectore", announcing them in 1882 and 1884. In 1882, he named another cardinal in pectore, announcing the name later that same year. On 30 December 1889, Leo XIII named only one cardinal whom he reserved in pectore, only announcing the name roughly six months later. In early 1893, he named another two cardinals in pectore, announcing their names in 1894 and 1895, while in April 1901 announcing the names of another two cardinals whom he had reserved in pectore in June 1899. In June 1896, Leo XIII named two other cardinals in pectore, announcing in March 1898 that both had died, hence, vacating the red hats he would have bestowed upon them.

With the elevation of Newman in 1879, it was widely praised throughout the English-speaking world, not simply on the account of Newman's virtues and reputation, but on the basis that Leo XIII had a broader episcopal vision in mind than Pius IX ever did. His similar appointments of two prominent participants of the First Vatican Council, Lajos Haynald and Friedrich Egon von Fürstenberg both in 1879 was also noteworthy due to their roles in the short-lived Council. It was even alleged that Félix Antoine Philibert Dupanloup, a vocal opponent of papal infallibility like Newman, would have been elevated to the cardinalate in 1879 had he not died in October 1878. Additionally, in 1884, the Polish priest and former Curial official Stefan Pawlicki was offered but refused an offer of elevation. Leo XIII later intended to name the Archbishop of Santiago Mariano Santiago Casanova Casanova as a cardinal in 1895; however, the pope abandoned the idea after the Peruvian Church objected that the Archbishop of Lima was the Primate of South America and hence the one that needed to be made a cardinal. In order to avoid a conflict between Chile and Peru, the pope abandoned the idea reluctantly.

In 1897, the pope intended to name the Archbishop of Turin Davide Riccardi as a cardinal but the cardinal died before the promotion could take place. In 1891 and again in 1897, the pope offered the cardinalate to Johannes Montel Edler von Treuenfels, the dean of the Sacred Rota, though he refused the honor (he refused again in 1908 when invited by Pope Pius X). In 1899, Leo XIII hoped to nominate the Dominican procurator general Hyacinthe-Marie Cormier (later beatified) to the cardinalate; however, he was unable to do so because the French government did not favor a cardinal from a religious order to seek its best interests as a Curial member. In 1901, he planned to name Agapito Panici as a cardinal at the next consistory, but Panici died before the nomination could take place in 1903. Allegedly, before deciding to name him, Leo XIII asked his brother Diomede to renounce his claim to the red hat, but when Agapito died in 1902, the pope informed Diomede that he would ignore his previous missive asking him to renounce his claim to the red hat, a position that Diomede was never then given. According to witnesses, Leo XIII failed three times to invite Vincenzo Tarozzi (whose cause for beatification has since been launched) to receive the red hat. According to a conversation in 1904 between Pope Pius X and Antonio Mele-Virdis, the former is alleged to have said, "he should have been in my place".

== Canonizations and beatifications ==
Leo XIII canonized the following saints during his pontificate:

- 8 December 1881: Clare of Montefalco (d. 1308), John Baptist de Rossi (1696–1764), Lawrence of Brindisi (d. 1619), and Benedict Joseph Labre (1748–1783)
- 15 January 1888: Seven Holy Founders of the Servite Order, Peter Claver (1581–1654), John Berchmans (1599–1621), and Alphonsus Rodriguez (1531–1617)
- 27 May 1897: Anthony Zaccaria (1502–1539) and Peter Fourier (1565–1640)
- 24 May 1900: John Baptist de la Salle (1651–1719) and Rita of Cascia (1381–1457)

Leo XIII beatified several of his predecessors: Urban II (14 July 1881), Victor III (23 July 1887) and Innocent V (9 March 1898). He canonized Adrian III on 2 June 1891.

He also beatified the following:

- Giancarlo Melchiori on 22 January 1882
- Edmund Campion and Ralph Sherwin in 1886
- John Haile on 29 December 1886
- Jean-Baptiste de La Salle (whom he later canonized) on 19 February 1888
- Inés de Benigánim on 26 February 1888
- Antonio Maria Zaccaria (whom he later canonized) on 3 January 1890
- Giovanni Giovenale Ancina on 9 February 1890
- Pompilio Maria Pirrotti on 26 January 1890
- Gerard Majella on 29 January 1893
- Leopoldo Croci on 12 May 1893
- Antonio Baldinucci on 16 April 1893
- Rodolfo Acquaviva and 4 Companions on 30 April 1893
- Diego José López-Caamaño on 22 April 1894
- Bernardino Realino on 12 January 1896
- Francis Regis Clet on 27 May 1900
- Ignatius Delgado y Cebrian as one of 64 Martyrs of Vietnam on 27 May 1900
- Gabriel-Taurin Dufresse on 27 May 1900
- John Lantrua of Triora on 27 May 1900
- Maria Maddalena Martinengo on 3 June 1900
- Dénis Berthelot of the Nativity and Redento Rodríguez of the Cross on 10 June 1900
- Jeanne de Lestonnac on 23 September 1900
- Antonio Grassi on 30 September 1900

He approved the cult of Cosmas of Aphrodisia. He beatified several of the English martyrs in 1895.

=== Doctors of the Church ===
Leo XIII named four individuals as Doctors of the Church:

- Cyril of Alexandria (28 July 1882) – he named him as "Doctor Incarnationis" ("Doctor of the Incarnation")
- Cyril of Jerusalem (28 July 1882)
- John of Damascus (29 August 1890)
- Bede the Venerable (13 November 1899) – he named him as "Anglorum doctor" ("Doctor of the English")

== Audiences ==
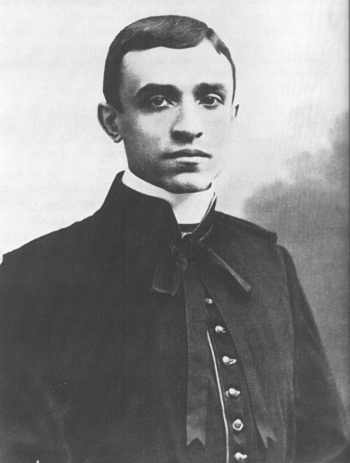
In 1901, Pope Leo XIII welcomed Eugenio Pacelli, later Pope Pius XII, on his first day of 57 years of service in the Vatican (1901–1958).

One of the first audiences that Leo XIII granted was to the professors and students of the Collegio Capranica, where in the first row knelt in front of him the young seminarian Giacomo Della Chiesa, the future Pope Benedict XV, who would be pope from 1914 to 1922.

On a pilgrimage with her father and sister in 1887, Thérèse of Lisieux attended a general audience with Pope Leo XIII and asked him to allow her to enter the Carmelite order. Even though she was strictly forbidden to speak to him because she was told that it would prolong the audience too much, she addressed him with the Pope telling her: "If it is God's will that you should enter the Convent, then it shall be".[a story of a soul]

In July 1884 Pope Leo received the French author Jules Verne and his family in a private audience; he was aware of Verne's scientific style of writing.

== St. Michael Prayer and alleged vision ==
There are several versions of a story of how Leo came to compose the Prayer to Saint Michael. Various dates are given. A common account says that on the morning of 13 October 1884, Leo XIII celebrated Mass but as he finished, he turned to step down the stairs and allegedly collapsed, falling into what was originally thought to be a coma, but was rather a mystical ecstasy. As the priests and cardinals rushed to his side, Leo XIII rose and visibly shaken, brushed off his aides and rushed back towards his apartment where he immediately wrote the Prayer to Saint Michael the Archangel. Leo XIII reportedly saw a vision of demons being released from Hell, and as the vision ended, he saw Saint Michael charge in and drive them all back into Hell. Leo XIII mandated that the prayer be said after every Low Mass from that point forth.

In 1934, a German writer, Fr. Bers, tried to trace the origin of the story and declared that, though the story was widespread, nowhere could he find a trace of proof. Sources close to the institution of the prayer in 1886, including an account of a conversation with Leo XIII about his decision, say nothing of the alleged vision. Bers concluded that the story was a later invention that spread like a virus.

== Health ==
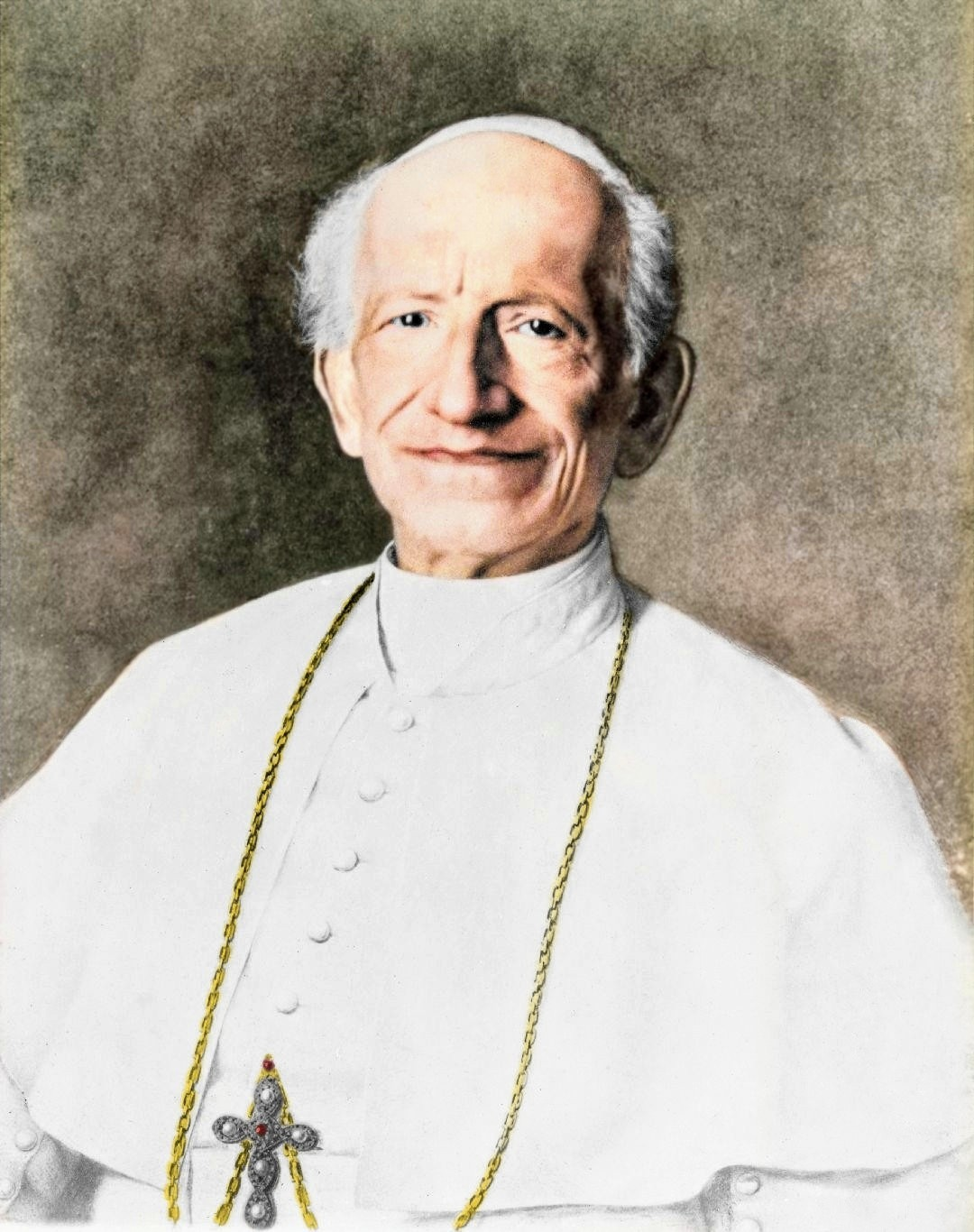
Pope Leo XIII in 1898

At the time of his election in 1878, the pope had started to experience a slight tremor in his hand due to a poorly undertaken bloodletting procedure for a previous malady.

In March 1899, it had been believed that the pope was gravely ill and that he was nearing death. Originally, it was presumed that the pope was suffering from a violent case of pneumonia and that the alarm was raised regarding his health. However, it was soon discovered that the reason for the pope's illness was the sudden inflammation of a cyst which had been troubling him for almost thirty years and which had never been previously removed. The only reason it had never been of any particular concern was due to incisions designed for pain relief. While Leo XIII strongly rejected the notion of surgery at first, he was persuaded by Cardinal Mariano Rampolla del Tindaro that it was necessary to ensure his good health. Before the pope was taken for surgery, he asked that his chaplain celebrate Mass in his private chapel while the operation was taking place. Reportedly, the cyst removed "was the size of an ordinary-sized orange".

Towards the end of his life, Leo XIII resorted to using a gold-headed cane when going on walks, as he often found it difficult to do so. While Leo XIII was certainly able to walk without it, he only walked without a cane if he truly felt comfortable doing so. When there were ever rumors about his health, Leo XIII was known to mischievously walk about briskly to dispel the rumors.

== Death ==
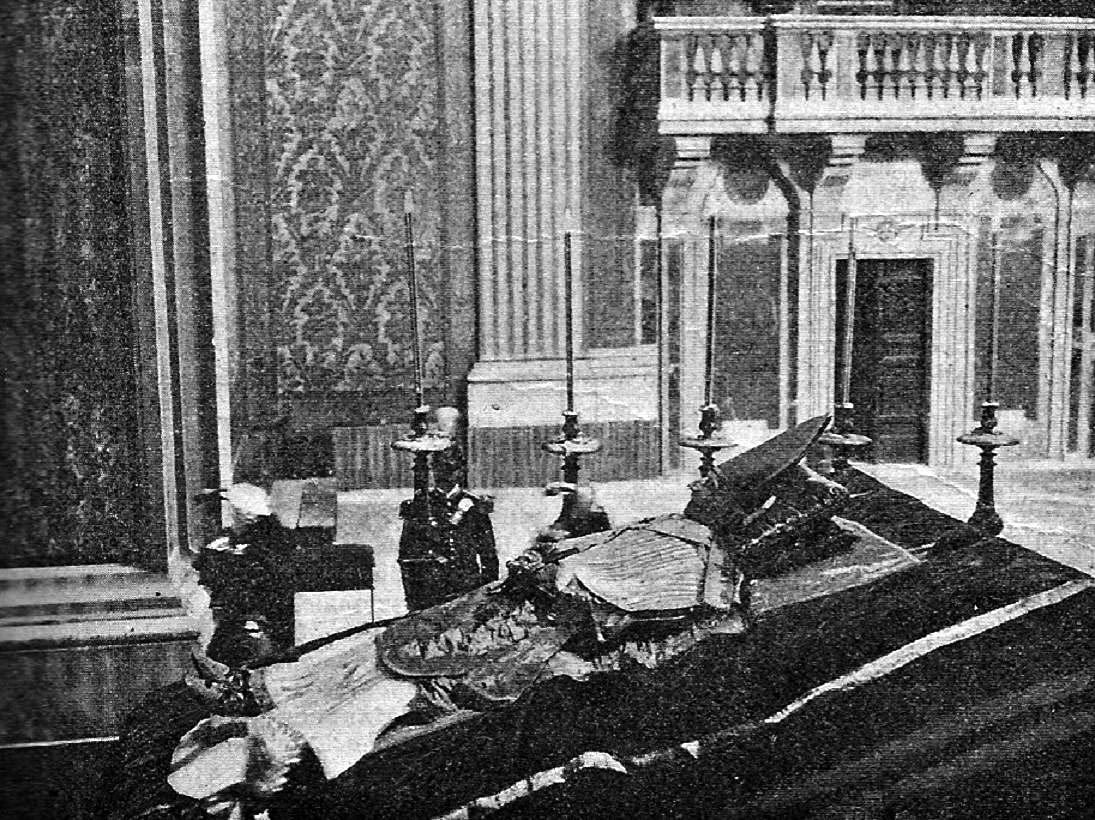
Pope Leo XIII lying in state in July 1903

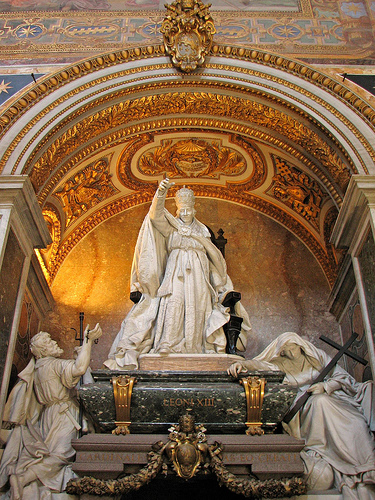
The monument and tomb to Leo XIII in the Archbasilica of Saint John Lateran

On 30 June 1903, Leo XIII reported slight feelings of dyspepsia and said that he would take a dose of castor oil to help himself recuperate, shrugging off concerns about his health. While it seemed to work, and the pope resumed his duties with a renewed vigor, it was not to last.

Leo XIII originally contracted a cold while taking an outing in the Vatican Gardens on 3 July 1903; however, his condition rapidly deteriorated to the point that he had contracted pneumonia. That night, he immediately went to bed and lost consciousness. Originally, the pope refused his doctor's desire to secure a second opinion from a colleague, insisting on a doctor who had previously tended to him in 1899 when he suffered a previous serious illness. When the doctor was immediately summoned to the pope's bedside, he determined that the castor oil had disturbed his stomach and exacerbated his condition. The pope's nephews were immediately notified of their uncle's illness, as were Cardinals Mariano Rampolla del Tindaro and Luigi Oreglia di Santo Stefano in their capacities as the Secretary of State and Camerlengo respectively. On 4 July, the pope made his last confession to Cardinal Serafino Vannutelli and later was barely able to recite the profession of faith. That same day, he experienced a loss of appetite and suffered from shortness of breath. On 5 July, the doctor reported that the hepatisation affected the upper and middle lobes of the right lung, while Leo XIII suffered from considerable cardiac weakness and difficulties in breathing, while reporting the absence of any fever or coughing fits. That same day, after having received the sacraments, the pope said, "I am now near my end. I do not know if all I have done has been good, but I certainly obeyed my conscience and our faith".

On 6 July 1903, he was administered an injection to ease the pain that he was experiencing, while it was reported that the pneumonia he had contracted was starting to spread to the left lung. The pope, who had an imperceptible pulse, had a restless night and was given oxygen by his doctors. When given the oxygen, Leo XIII replied, "That is much better. Before I felt as though I had lost my liberty". That morning, he intimated to those with him that he would prefer it if Cardinal Girolamo Maria Gotti succeeded him in the next conclave. When doctors ordered him to rest, so as not to further aggravate his declining health, Leo XIII said: "If it were only of any use, but I do not believe it would be. The brief remainder of my life must be given to God's Church, not to my own poor comfort". The pope lost consciousness but was awake to receive the sacraments at 9:00 pm before experiencing yet another restless night, marveling, "God's will be done. Who would have believed it when only ten days ago I was presiding over a public consistory?" Leo XIII only slept three hours but severe pain saw him immediately awaken, complaining of pain on both sides of the thorax that forced doctors to move his frail form for better comfort. His situation had previously been critical that afternoon when he was given the Last Rites, while his doctors apprised him of his sudden deterioration. On 7 July, the feeble pope asked that the shutters of his window be opened, saying "I wish to see once more, perhaps for the last time, the rays of the sun". In the nights following, the pope suffered from several coughing fits, perspiring heavily due to his rising fever. The pope felt slightly better enough on 10 July to receive a group of Hungarian pilgrims; however, the pope was exhausted and collapsed after the meeting.

Leo XIII deteriorated further until he died at 3:55 pm on 20 July 1903, whispering a final blessing before he died. However, Vatican officials gave the time of his death as 4:06 pm when officials officially confirmed that the pope had died. Officially, Leo XIII had died of pneumonia, followed by hemorrhagic pleurisy.

Leo XIII was the first pope to be born in the 19th century and was also the first to die in the 20th century, living to the age of 93. He is the oldest verified pope to have served in the office. (Note: Pope Benedict XVI served as "Pope emeritus" from his resignation as pope at the age of 86 to his death at 95.) There are three other popes that are claimed to have lived longer than Pope Leo XIII: Pope St Agatho (c. 577–681), who died aged approximately 104; Pope Gregory IX (1145–1241), who died at the age of 96; and Pope Adrian I (700–795), who died at the age of 95. However, although there is some contemporary documentation attesting to their ages, there is not sufficient evidence for them to be verified with complete certainty.

At the time of his death, Leo XIII was the third-longest-reigning pope (25 years), exceeded only by his immediate predecessor, Pius IX (31 years), and Saint Peter (38 years).

He was entombed in Saint Peter's Basilica only briefly after his funeral; he was later moved to the Basilica of Saint John Lateran, his cathedral church as the Bishop of Rome, and a church in which he took a particular interest. He was moved there in late 1924. Leo was the last pope not to be buried in St. Peter's Basilica until Pope Francis was interred at Santa Maria Maggiore in 2025.

== Tributes ==
Pope Paul VI described Leo XIII as "great and wise", his "first teacher", from whom he had inherited "a pastoral outlook and a pastoral approach".

Upon his election in 2025, Cardinal Robert Francis Prevost assumed the name Leo XIV in honor of Leo XIII. Leo XIV stated that one of the main reasons he chose his papal name was because of the social justice encyclical Rerum novarum that was written by Pope Leo XIII.

Saint Leo University in Saint Leo, Florida, is partially named for Pope Leo XIII, as well as for Pope Leo I.

== In sound recording and film ==
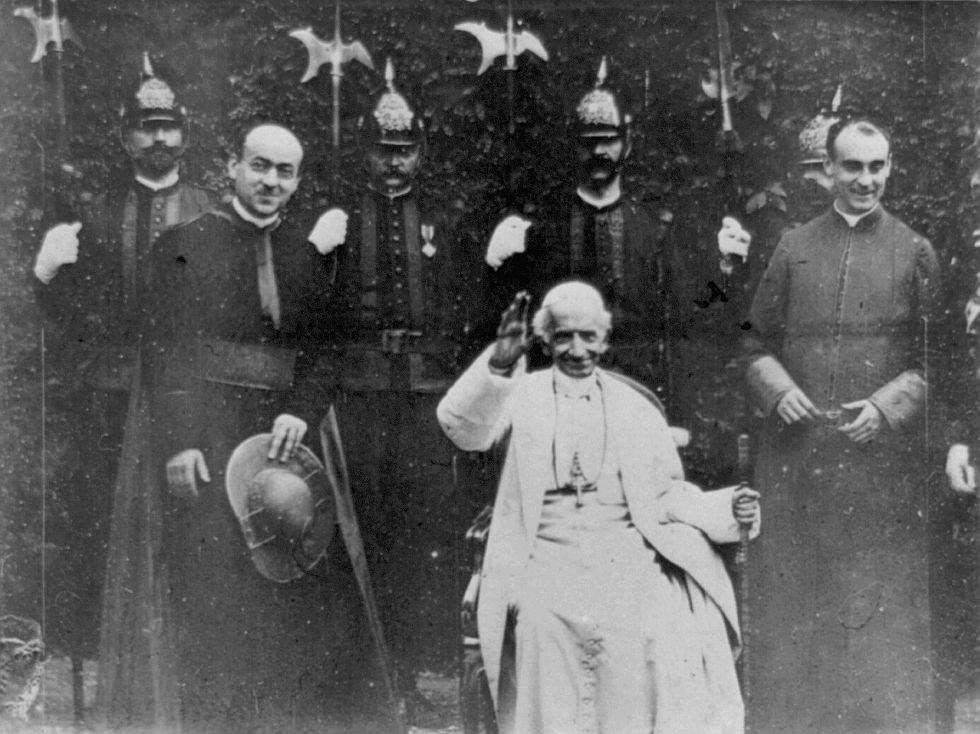
Photogram of Sua Santità papa Leone XIII, the first time a Pope appeared on film

Leo XIII was the first pope whose voice was recorded. The recording can be found on a compact disc of Alessandro Moreschi's singing; a recording of his praying of the Ave Maria is available on the web. He was also the first pope to be filmed by a motion picture camera. He was filmed in 1898 by inventor W. K. Dickson, and blessed the camera while being filmed. The video contains three segments: the pope on a throne, the pope arriving in a horse-drawn carriage, and the pope taking a seat on a bench. Born in 1810, he may also be the earliest-born known person to appear in a film.

In the 2024 film Cabrini, Pope Leo XIII is depicted by Giancarlo Giannini in several scenes offering his support to Mother Cabrini for her mission in the United States in 1889 and thereafter.

== See also ==
- Cardinals created by Leo XIII
- Distributism
- List of popes
- List of popes by length of reign
- Papal Navy
- Prayer to Saint Michael
- Restoration of the Scottish hierarchy

== Bibliography ==
=== In English ===
- Chadwick, Owen (2003). A History of the Popes 1830–1914. pp. 273–331. Archived from the original on 24 May 2018 – via Questia.
- Chadwick, Owen. The Popes and European Revolution (1981) 655pp excerpt; also online
- Duffy, Eamon (1997), Saints and Sinners, A History of the Popes, Yale University Press.
- Thérèse of Lisieux (1996), Story of a Soul – The Autobiography of St. Thérèse of Lisieux, Clarke, John Clarke trans (3rd ed.), Washington, DC: ICS.
- Quardt, Robert, The Master Diplomat; From the Life of Leo XIII, Wolson, Ilya trans, New York: Alba House.
- O'Reilly, Bernard (1887), Life of Leo XIII – From An Authentic Memoir – Furnished By His Order, New York: Charles L Webster & Co.

=== In German ===
- Ernesti, Jörg (2019), Leo XIII – Papst und Staatsmann, Herder (in German), Freiburg.
- Bäumer, Remigius (1992), Marienlexikon [Dictionary of Mary], Eos (in German), et al, St Ottilien.
- Franzen, August; Bäumer, Remigius (1988), Papstgeschichte (in German), Freiburg: Herder.
- Kühne, Benno (1880), Papst Leo XIII [Pope Leo XIII] (in German), New York & St. Louis: C&N Benzinger, Einsideln.
- Quardt, Robert (1964), Der Meisterdiplomat [The Master Diplomat] (in German), Kevelaer, DE: Butzon & Bercker
- Schmidlin, Josef (1934), Papstgeschichte der neueren Zeit (in German), München: Kösel-Pustet.

=== In Italian ===
- Regoli, Roberto (2009). "L'elite cardinalizia dopo la fine dello stato pontificio". Archivum Historiae Pontificiae. 47: 63–87. JSTOR 23565185.

Diplomatic posts
| Preceded by Raffaele Fornari | Apostolic Nuncio to Belgium; 1843–1846 | Succeeded by Innocenzo Ferrieri |
Catholic Church titles
| Preceded by Giovanni Giacomo Sinibaldi | — TITULAR — Archbishop of Tamiathis; 1843–1846 | Succeeded by Diego Planeta |
| Preceded by Carlo Filesio Cittadini | Archbishop-Bishop of Perugia^{1} 1846–1878 | Succeeded by Federico Pietro Foschi |
| Preceded by Filippo de Angelis | Camerlengo of the Holy Roman Church; 22 September 1877 – 20 February 1878 | Succeeded by Camillo di Pietro |
| Preceded by Pius IX | Pope; 20 February 1878 – 20 July 1903 | Succeeded by Pius X |
Notes and references
1. Retained personal title
