= Sua Santità papa Leone XIII =

1898 short film featuring Pope Leo XIII

- Complete copy from the Vatican Film Library
- Directed by: William Kennedy Dickson
- Starring: Pope Leo XIII; Francesco S. Della Volpe; Rafael Merry del Val
- Distributed by: Biograph Company
- Release date: 1898
- Running time: 156 seconds
- Country: Kingdom of Italy
- Language: Italian

Sua Santità papa Leone XIII (Italian for 'His Holiness Pope Leo XIII') is an 1898 short film directed by William Kennedy Dickson for the Biograph Company and is one of the first existing films shot in the Kingdom of Italy. The short film was shot in the Vatican gardens between June and July of that year, after a long wait and negotiations with the prefect of the Apostolic Chamber Francesco Salesio Della Volpe and with the intercession of the pontiff's nephew, Count Pecci. It is a montage of three different shots with the blessing of Pope Leo XIII, eighty-eight years old at the time, and was probably filmed on Kodak film.

The film was long thought to have been directed in 1896 and attributed to the Lumière brothers' company and to the Turinese cinema pioneer Vittorio Calcina. The Holy See, in fact, had revoked the concession of the images to the American company, disapproving the screening of the film in variety theaters; at that point the footage was given to the Lumières. The story was reconstructed by the historian and researcher Gianluca della Maggiore by studying the Vatican archives.
