= Tommaso Maria Zigliara =

French cardinal, philosopher and theologian

His Eminence Tommaso Maria Zigliara OP
- Cardinal-Bishop-Elect of Frascati
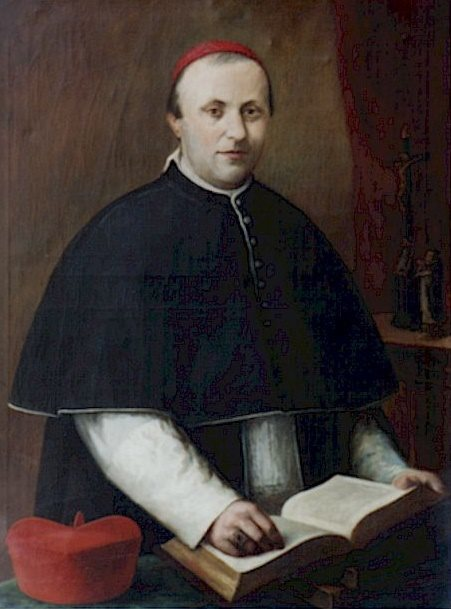
- See: Frascati
- Appointed: 16 January 1893
- Predecessor: Edward Henry Howard
- Successor: Serafino Vannutelli
- Other post: Prefect of the Congregation for Studies
- Previous posts: Cardinal-Deacon of Santi Cosma e Damiano (1879–1891); Prefect of the Congregation for Indulgences and Relics (1886–1887); Cardinal-Priest of Santa Prassede (1891–1893)

Orders
- Ordination: 17 May 1856 by Vincenzo Gioacchino Raffaele Luigi Pecci
- Created cardinal: 12 May 1879 by Pope Leo XIII
- Rank: Cardinal Bishop

Personal details
- Born: Francesco Zigliara; 29 October 1833 Bonifacio, Corsica, France
- Died: 10 May 1893 (aged 59) Rome
- Denomination: Roman Catholic
- Coat of arms

Tommaso Maria Zigliara (29 October 1833 – 11 May 1893) was a Corsican priest of the Catholic Church, a member of the Dominicans, a theologian, philosopher and a cardinal.

== Early life ==
Zigliara was born on 29 October 1833 at Bonifacio a seaport of Corsica. He was baptized "Francesco". His early classical studies were made in his native town under the Jesuit teacher, Father Aloysius Piras. At the age of eighteen he was received into the Order of Preachers at Rome, and made his religious profession in 1852 and studied philosophy at the College of Saint Thomas, the future Pontifical University of Saint Thomas Aquinas, Angelicum. From the beginning Zigliara was a student of uncommon brilliancy. He completed his theology studies at Perugia where, on 17 May 1856, he was ordained by Gioacchino Pecci, Archbishop of Perugia and the future Pope Leo XIII.

== Career ==
Soon after ordination the young priest was appointed to teach philosophy, first in Rome, then at Corbara in his native Corsica, and later in the diocesan seminary at Viterbo while master of novices in the neighbouring convent at Gradi.

When his work at Viterbo was finished, he was called to Rome, again made master of novices. Zigliara taught at the Collegium Divi Thomae, the future Pontifical University of Saint Thomas Aquinas, Angelicum, from 1870 to 1879, becoming a master in sacred theology and serving as regent of the college after 1873. Before assuming this latter duty, he was raised to the dignity of master in sacred theology. When his community was forced by the Italian Government in 1873 to give up the convent of the Minerva, Zigliara with other professors and students took refuge with the Fathers of the Holy Ghost, who had charge of the French College in Rome. Here the lectures were continued until a house near the Minerva was secured. Zigliara's fame was now widespread in Rome and elsewhere. French, Italian, German, English, and American bishops were eager to put some of their most promising students and young professors under his tuition.

Zigliara had a role in composing papal encyclicals that supported the revival of Thomism and responded to the modernist crisis: Aeterni Patris and Rerum novarum.

Pope Leo XIII, long a friend of Zigliari, included him among the first group of prelates he made cardinals, creating him a cardinal deacon on 12 May 1879. He confirmed him as a cardinal priest assigned the titular church of Santa Prassede on 1 June 1891.

In a consistory held on 16 January 1893, Zigliari exercised his option to join the highest order of cardinals, cardinal bishop, choosing to become Bishop of Frascati, one of the seven suburbicarian sees. His health prevented him from being consecrated a bishop before his death in Rome on 11 May 1893.

== Works ==
He was a member of seven Roman congregations, besides being prefect of the Congregation of Studies and co-president of the Pontifical Academy of St. Thomas Aquinas. He was a man of deep piety and devotion, and a tireless student to the end of his life. In addition to his many duties as cardinal, he was entrusted with the superintendence of the Leonine edition of the works of St. Thomas, the first volume of which contains his own commentary. He also found time to publish his "Propaedeutica ad Sacram Theologiam" and to write an extensive work on the sacraments, of which only the tracts on baptism and penance received final revision before his death. The most important, however, of Zigliara's works is his "Summa philosophica in usum scholarum" (3 vols.)(Romae: Ex Typographia Polyglotta, 1876), which has been reprinted many times by various publishers, and which enjoys a worldwide circulation. For many years this work has been the preferred textbook on philosophy in a great number of the Roman Catholic seminaries and colleges of Europe, Canada, and the United States. Around the turn of the 20th century it was adopted as the textbook for the philosophical examination in the National University of Ireland. Zigliara's other works are:

- Osservazioni su alcune interpretazioni di G.C. Ubaghs sull' ideologia di San Tommaso d'Aquino (Viterbo, 1870)
- Della luce intellettuale e dell'ontologismo secondo la dottrina di S. Bonaventura e Tommaso d'Aquino (2 vols., Rome, 1874)
- De mente Concilii Viennensis in definiendo dogmate unionis animae humanae cum corpore (1878)
- Commentaria S. Thomae in Aristotelis libros Peri Hermeneias et Posteriorum analyticorum, in fol. vol. I new edit. "Opp. S. Thomae": (Rome, 1882)
- Saggio sui principi del tradizionalismo
- Dimittatur e la spiegazione datane dalla S. Congregazione dell' Indice.

By his teaching and through his writings, he was one of the chief instruments, under Leo XIII, of reviving and propagating Thomistic philosophy throughout the entire Church. In his own order and in some universities and seminaries, the teaching of St. Thomas had never been interrupted, but it was reserved for Zigliara to give a special impetus to the movement which has made Thomistic philosophy and theology dominant in the Catholic world.

Catholic Church titles
Preceded by Joseph Hergenröther	Cardinal Protodeacon; 1890–1891	Succeeded by Isidoro Verga
