= Edward Henry Howard =

English Catholic priest and archbishop

His Eminence Edward Henry Cardinal Howard
- Cardinal-Bishop of Frascati
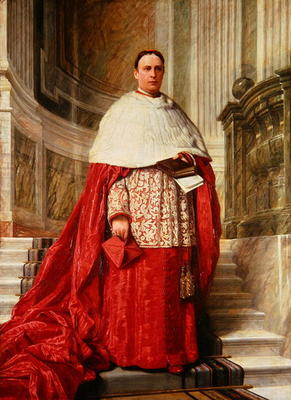
- See: Frascati
- Appointed: 24 March 1884
- Term ended: 16 September 1892
- Predecessor: Filippo Maria Guidi
- Successor: Tommaso Maria Zigliara
- Other post: Archpriest of St. Peter's Basilica
- Previous posts: Titular Archbishop of Neocaesarea in Ponto (1872–1877); Cardinal-Priest of Ss. Giovanni e Paolo (1877–1884)

Orders
- Ordination: 8 December 1854
- Consecration: 30 June 1872 by Carlo Sacconi
- Created cardinal: 12 March 1877 by Pope Pius IX
- Rank: Cardinal-Bishop

Personal details
- Born: 13 February 1829 Hainton, Nottingham, England
- Died: 16 September 1892 (aged 63) Hatch Beauchamp, Brighton, Sussex, England
- Buried: Fitzalan Chapel, Arundel Castle, Sussex, England
- Denomination: Catholic Church
- Parents: Edward Giles Howard and Frances Anne Heneage

Edward Henry Howard (13 February 1829 – 16 September 1892) was an English Catholic priest and archbishop, who was made a cardinal in 1877. He was a relative of the Dukes of Norfolk.

Howard is in the episcopal lineage of Pope Francis.

== Life ==
Howard was the son of Edward Gyles Howard, by his marriage to Frances Anne Heneage, and was educated at St Mary's College, Oscott. His father was the son of Edward Charles Howard, the youngest brother of Bernard Howard, 12th Duke of Norfolk. His father's sister Julia Barbara Howard was married to Henry Stafford-Jerningham, 9th Baron Stafford, from 1829 until she died in 1856.

After a short stint of service as a British Army officer with the Life Guards, during which he commanded the detachment escorting the hearse at the Duke of Wellington's funeral in 1852, Howard resigned his commission to study for the priesthood at the Academy of Noble Ecclesiastics in Rome, and was ordained a priest in 1854. He served as a missionary in Goa, Portuguese India. After his return to Rome, he continued to work with Englishmen who wished to convert from Anglicanism to Catholicism. In June 1871, he was made titular Archbishop of Neocaesaria in partibus and assistant bishop to the Cardinal Bishop of Frascati.

Howard was elevated to Cardinal-Priest of Ss. Giovanni e Paolo on 12 March 1877 and in 1878 appointed Protector of the English College at Rome, an institution to which he later left his valuable library. For about a year, he was papal envoy to Goa, India, to negotiate between the British and the Portuguese authorities the settlement of the problems concerning the ecclesiastical government of the Province of Goa. He wanted to become a missionary in the East but the Pope Pius IX insisted that he stay in Rome. He served in pastoral ministry in Rome as confessor of the poor and the soldiers. In December 1881 he became Archpriest of Saint Peter's Basilica. On 24 March 1884 he became Cardinal-Bishop of the suburbicarian diocese of Frascati.

In failing health, he retired to Brighton shortly before his death, which occurred on 16 September 1892. He is buried at the Fitzalan Chapel in Arundel, West Sussex.

== Honours ==
- (Hawaiian Kingdom) Knight Grand Cross of the Royal Order of Kalākaua I, 1881

Catholic Church titles
Preceded by Pompeo Aldrovandi	Titular Archbishop of Neocaesarea in Ponto; 1872–1877	Succeeded by Gaetano Aloisi Masella
Preceded by Mariano Barrio Fernández	Cardinal-Priest of Santi Giovanni e Paolo; 1877–1884	Succeeded by Placido Maria Schiaffino
Preceded by Jean Baptiste François Pitra	Cardinal-Bishop of Frascati; 1884–1892	Succeeded by Tommaso Maria Zigliara
