= 2022 in Vatican City =

- Decades: 2000s; 2010s; 2020s
- See also: History of Vatican City; List of years in Vatican City

Events in the year 2022 in Vatican City.

== Incumbents ==
- Pope: Francis
- Cardinal Secretary of State: Pietro Parolin
- President of the Pontifical Commission: Fernando Vérgez Alzaga

== Events ==
Ongoing – COVID-19 pandemic in Vatican City

=== January ===
- 1 January – Pope Francis recited his New Year's wishes to the world, encouraging people to focus on the good which united them, calling out violence against women as an "insult [to] God", and acknowledging that the coronavirus pandemic has left many scared and struggling amid economic inequality.
- 5 January – A decree was signed tightening COVID-19 regulations by requiring the use of FFP2 masks inside "all closed spaces," and making vaccinations and booster shots mandatory for employees and visitors wishing to enter the Vatican Museums and gardens, with fines ranging from $28 to more than $1,700.
- 25 January – Vatican prosecutors issued new indictments against four more individuals involved in the financial scandal over the Church's investment in the London real estate deal. Italian financier Raffaele Mincione, attorney Nicola Squillace, former SoS employee Fabrizio Tirabassi, and former secretary to Cardinal Giovanni Angelo Becciu (also a defendant in the trial) Monsignor Mauro were those newly indicted in the "mega trial".
- 26 January – Pope Francis called for this day to be "a day of prayer for peace for Ukraine," expressing concern over the increasing tensions threatening peace and security in the nation and in the rest of Europe.

=== February ===
- 10 February – News surfaced that Archbishop Edgar Peña Parra allegedly invited Italian intelligence operatives into the Vatican's inner sanctum and outsourced internal Vatican intelligence, potentially with the use of bugged rooms. The testimony came from former SoS protocol officer Vincenzo Mauriello who reportedly helped connect Peña Parra with an Italian intelligence agent, after "his private conversations he had had were regularly becoming known around the Vatican".
- 14 February – Ukraine's new ambassador Andriy Yurash announced that his nation was open to a Vatican mediation of its conflict with Russia in the Donbas region, and wanted Pope Francis to visit as soon as possible, despite the danger in the region.
- 18 February – The Vatican's fraud and extortion trials resumed today. Ten people, including a Cardinal, were on trial in connection with the 350 million euro investment of a London property, and Archbishop Edgar Peña Parra was on trial for extortion after Mauriello's 10 February testimony.
- 25 February – Pope Francis made a visit "not follow[ing] typically protocol" to the Russian Embassy to express his concern about the outbreak of the Russian Invasion of Ukraine. "the Pope personally wanted to ask about the situation in Donbas and Ukraine" Russian Ambassador Aleksandr Avdeyev at the embassy commented.

=== March ===
- 6 March – Pope Francis described the Russian invasion of Ukraine as a war and not a special military operation, as per Russian terminology.
- 12 March
  - Pope Francis announced further updates to Vatican legislation "to strengthen the tools for preventing and combating crimes and respond to the growing demand for justice. which is also registered in our state," while opening the nation's judicial year.
  - The Vatican expressed "surprise and pain" at Nicaragua's expulsion of the papal nuncio Polish Msgr. Waldemar Stanisław Sommertag because of pressure on opposition figures in the nation, also calling the action "grave and unjustified" in a statement.
- 18 March – Rosalie LaBillois of the Eel River Bar First Nation, is to travel with Elders, knowledge keepers, residential school survivors, and youth, to meet with Pope Francis at the end of the month.
- 19 March – A new Apostolic Constitution reforming the Roman Curia titled Praedicate Evangelium ("Preach the Gospel") was published and promulgated by Pope Francis.
- 20 March – Pope Francis described the Russian invasion of Ukraine as an "aggression", emphasizing that the Russians had invaded a sovereign territory.
- 30 March – Monsignor Mauro Carlino testified in the ongoing financial fraud trial which concerned corruption linked to the 2017 London real estate deal, that his involvement in the deal was limited to obeying orders. "Before the cross, I have asked myself many times what I did wrong... I only obeyed," he added.
- 31 March – A delegation from the Assembly of First Nations perform in St. Peter's Square at the Vatican, seeking an apology for the Catholic Church's role in helping run the Canadian Indian residential school system.

=== April ===
- 1 April – Pope Francis issued a historic apology for the "deplorable" abuses to the Métis, Inuit, and First Nations communities who came yesterday seeking a papal apology. The Pope further said he hoped to visit Canada around the Feast of St. Anna, which would be on 26 July.
- 2–3 April – Pope Francis on a visit to Malta delivered his strongest condemnation at that time on the Russian invasion of Ukraine, calling Russia "caught up in anachronistic claims of nationalist interests" and "provoking and fomenting conflicts," while also criticizing the UN for inaction. The Pope said this while holding a Ukrainian flag from Bucha. The Pope also said that a possible trip to Kyiv in the future was "on the table".
- 7 April – Cardinal Parolin announced to reporters that a papal visit to Ukraine's capital city Kyiv was "not impossible... it's a matter of seeing what consequences this trip would have and assessing whether it would really contribute to ending the war".
- 10 April – During Holy Week mass, Pope Francis called for "weapons to be laid down to begin an Easter truce, not to reload weapons and resume fighting," while not specially mentioning Ukraine and Russia.
- 11 April
  - The Vatican announces the possibility of extending Pope Francis' trip to Lebanon in June so that he could also fly to Jerusalem to meet pro–Russian Orthodox bishop Patriarch Kirill.
  - The new US ambassador to the Vatican Joe Donnelly presented his credentials to Pope Francis at the apostolic palace. This was met with some controversy by the press because of Donnelly's previous pro-life voting record was just 28%, a key stance of the Catholic Church.
- 12 April – Archbishop Sviatoslav Shevchuk of the Ukrainian Greek Catholic Church asked Pope Francis to scrap plans to have a Ukrainian woman and a Russian woman carry the cross together during the Way of the Cross service at Rome's Colosseum on 15 April. Shevchuk stated the gesture could be perceived as "incoherent and even offensive" with the war still active in Ukraine.
- 14 April – Papal Almoner Cardinal Konrad Krajewski delivered a second ambulance donated by Pope Francis to the cardiological hospital in Kyiv.
- 16 April – Easter Vigil Mass was held in the nation, and was attended by most notably Melitopol Mayor Ivan Fedorov and Ukrainian lawmakers Maria Mezentseva, Olena Khomenko, and Rusem Umerov, who sat all together in the front row.
- 20 April – Another meeting was held between a Métis delegation and Pope Francis in the nation. President of the Manitoba Métis Federation David Chartrand said to reporters after the meeting the Pope "actually asked for our forgiveness. He said how ashamed he was for this to happen to our people and he asked us to pray for him also".
- 25 April – Pope Francis and six of the seven members of his international Council of Cardinals met in-person to discuss the war in Ukraine and how to find a peaceful solution to end the war, according to Vatican press.
- 27 April – Former director of the financial watchdog agency Tommaso Di Ruzza testified that Pope Francis asked him to help the Vatican secretariat of state get full control of the 350 million euro investment in the luxury London property.
- 27–29 April – Members of the Pontifical Academy of Social Sciences held a plenary meeting to primarily discuss the role of the family and "the challenge of love".
- 30 April – Due to the Pope's ongoing struggle with an inflamed ligament in his right knee and leg causing pain, the Pope's doctor ordered him not to walk.

=== May ===
- 2 May – Due to an ongoing struggle with knee pain, Pope Francis met with members of the International Federation of Catholic Pharmacists at his Vatican residence, instead of the apostolic palace which was previously planned.
- 2–6 May – Rome's yearly plenary was held with a primary focus on substantive changes for more religious women to have a permanent seat at the table.
- 3 May
  - Pope Francis asked to meet with Russian President Vladimir Putin in Moscow to help bring about the end of the war in Ukraine. The Pope further warned Putin-supporter Orthodox Bishop Patriarch Kirill, that he should not become Putin's "altar boy".
  - Bishops and Cardinals deliberated the positio of the late Archbishop Teofilo Camomot. If approved, this would be the first step towards sainthood.
  - Vatican officials exonerated Cardinal Rainer Maria Woelki and his vicar general, Msgr. Markus Hofmann, announcing they did not violate canon law in their funding and findings in an investigation of a priest accused of sex abuse.
- 4 May
  - Japanese PM Fumio Kishida met with Pope Francis to discuss his deep concern about China's actions in the South China Sea, human rights violations in Hong Kong and Xinjiang, "North Korea", "the Russian invasion of Ukraine", and the threat of nuclear weapons to the world.
  - The Secretariat of State signed the protocol for the "Foundation for the Renovation of the Papal Swiss Guard Barracks in the Vatican" into law, which would renovate the Swiss Guards barracks to be able to accommodate female members if Pope Francis allowed it.
- 5 May – Giovanni Angelo Becciu held a two-and-a-half hour testimony in the ongoing financial fraud trial. In the testimony, Becciu discussed his relations with manager Cecilia Marogna and Monsignor Alberto Perlasca, bank transfers to Australia and the details of the sale of the London property, and allegedly that Pope Francis authorized spending up to 1 million euros to free a Colombian nun kidnapped by al-Qaeda-linked militants in Mali, also revealing previously secret papal approval to hire a British security firm to find the nun and secure her freedom. The nun was eventually let go last year on 21 October, but it is still unclear if any Vatican money actually was given to the militants.
- 6 May – Pope Francis, using a wheelchair due to knee pain, welcomed and thanked the 36 men from Switzerland who were to be sworn in as Swiss Guards that day.
- 11 May – The Vatican announced "concern" for the arrest of Cardinal Joseph Zen in Hong Kong, stating they would follow any developments very closely.
- 13 May – Vatican officials announced Pope Francis will be "Accepting the invitation... [of] the Indigenous communities," and would visit them in Canada from 24–29 July, and would return on 30 July.
- 15 May – Pope Francis recognized 10 new saints of the Catholic Church during a canonization mass in St. Peter's Square. St. Titus Brandsma, St. Devasahayam, St. César de Bus, St. Luigi Maria Palazzolo, St. Giustino Russolillo, St. Charles de Foucauld, St. Anne-Marie Rivier, St. Maria Francesca Rubatto, St. Carolina Santocanale, and St. Maria Domenica Mantovani were officially declared "to be saints".
- 18 May
  - Foreign minister Archbishop Paul Gallagher arrived in Kyiv to "balance its concern for Ukrainians" while keeping an open "channel of dialogue with Russia". Gallagher was expected to meet with Ukrainian Foreign Minister Dmytro Kuleba and visit nearby destruction on 20 May in a visit originally scheduled for before Easter but was postponed after Gallagher caught COVID-19.
  - At the ongoing financial fraud trial, Cardinal Angelo Becciu testified that Pope Francis himself ordered the ouster of auditor-general Libero Milone back on 20 June 2017. Until then, the departure had no explanation for why Milone left with little notice.
- 19 May – Pope Francis congratulated and thanked participants from the Institute of Psychology at the Pontifical Gregorian University for the institute's contributions to the Church over the past half century at their 50th anniversary ceremony.
- 23 May – Two Italian priests of the Vatican Observatory discovered a new mathematical approach which they claimed would help astronomers better understand how gravity behaved at the time of the Big Bang. They further said the finding "confirms that our universe appears mathematically ordered and harmonious".
- 24 May – Pope Francis named Cardinal Matteo Zuppi, as the new head of the Episcopal Conference of Italy during the second day of the conference spring meeting.
- 29 May – Pope Francis, in a surprise announcement three months ahead of schedule, called for a consistory for 27 August for the creation of 21 new Cardinals.
- 31 May – New testimony from a former employee at the Secretariat of State Fabrizio Tirabassi in the London real estate trail stated the decision to invest funds into a luxury London apartment complex was made "abruptly and unjustifiably".

=== June ===
- 2 June
  - The nation's stamp and coin office released several commemorative coins, including one promoting the importance of vaccinations and another silver medal calling for peace in Ukraine. Proceeds from the sales will be used to help victims of the war.
  - A decree passed updating COVID-19 protocols which allowed most employees and visitors to enter the nation without a vaccination certificate or proof of recovery. The vaccine mandate still "remain(s) in effect for the Pontifical Swiss Guards," according to the decree.
- 5 June – The new Apostolic Constitution reforming the Roman Curia titled Praedicate Evangelium ("Preach the Gospel") published on 19 March, became law and entered into force. The new constitution provides economic reforms, changes on how power is exercised in the Church, and unifications and creations of new offices and dicasteries within the nation.
- 6 June – London fund manager Raffaele Mincione testified during the London real estate trail that the nation would have turned a profit on its valuable investment if it had not pulled out funding for the property prematurely.
- 7 June – A new Investment Committee, headed by cardinal Kevin Joseph Farrell and other four outside financial experts who each have 5-year terms, is established to oversee the ethics of the nations investments as the corruption trial related to the botched London real estate deal continues. The establishment of the investment committee is expected to bring financial decline, but "moral reform" to the church.
- 8 June
  - Cardinal Óscar Andrés Rodríguez Maradiaga in an interview dismissed circulating online rumors of the pope resigning as "a cheap soap opera".
  - About 30 Italians wearing red T-shirts bearing the words "Fuck Cancer Choir" are given "VIP treatment" to sit in the front section at St. Peter's Square to sing to the Pope during his daily address.
- 9 June – World Taekwondo President Chungwon Choue visits the Pontifical Council for Culture to meet secretary Paul Tighe and seven students training in taekwondo, as part of an effort to continue the recent success of the sport in the nation.
- 10 June
  - Pope Francis postpones a trip to the Democratic Republic of the Congo and South Sudan scheduled for the first week of July because of his knee injury, at his doctor's request.
  - London-based Italian financier Raffaele Mincione testified again restating what he claimed on 6 June at the ongoing London real estate trial that the Vatican Secretariat of State's decision to back out of investing the property is to blame for the financial losses.
- 11 June – Pope Francis thanked the Grenadiers of Sardinia brigade stationed in Rome for making the streets of the city "safer, more secure, and more livable". The brigade was stationed as part of "Operation Safe Streets," which involved various branches of Italy's armed forces "guaranteeing security, public order, and tranquility, mainly in the bigger cities".
- 12 June – In celebration of Trinity Sunday, Pope Francis preached to the visitors gathered at St. Peter's Square that the Holy Trinity shows us to be open to others, and that "we are not islands, we are in the world to live in God's image: open, in need of others and in need of helping others," before reciting the Angelus prayer.
- 14 June – Pope Francis named Florida-born Father Mark Lewis, to be the next rector of the Pontifical Gregorian University in Rome.
- 15 June
  - Pope Francis decreed, in a decision approved on 7 February, that diocesan bishops now must receive a "written license" from the Dicastery for Institutes of Consecrated Life and Societies of Apostolic Life before erecting "a public association of the faithful with a view to becoming an institute of consecrated life or a society of apostolic life of diocesan right".
  - The Vatican released a document written in Italian and Spanish titled "Catechumenal Itineraries for Married Life" by Pope Francis. The document provides guidance for couples "who have experienced the failure of their marriages and live in a new relationship or have been remarried civilly".
- 29 June – The Vatican published the official translations of the Praedicate Evangelium for the Arabic, English, Portuguese, and Spanish languages. The official French, German, and Polish language texts were also announced to become available "in the coming weeks".

=== July ===
- 3 July - Sunday Mass and the Angelus prayer in Vatican City.
- 4 July - Audience with the European Swimming League delegation.
- 8 July
  - Secretary for Relations with States Archbishop Paul Richard Gallagher announced that plans for a Papal visit to Kyiv had begun, with the trip possibly taking place as early as August, on Italian TV news program TG1. Archbishop Gallagher further said that the Pope is "very convinced that if he were to make a visit it would have positive results".
  - In a statement released by the Vatican, Permanent Observer to the UN Archbishop Gabriele Giordano Caccia "in the name and on behalf of Vatican City State" announced the nation's accession into the UN Framework Convention on Climate Change (UNFCCC) and Paris Climate Agreement.
- 10 July – During the Sunday Angelus, Pope Francis urged the leaders of Sri Lanka "not to ignore the cry of the poor and the needs of the people", with the news of the President's Palace in the nation being stormed by the people in response to widespread government corruption and mismanagement over the weekend.
- 11 July – 4 September was announced as the date for Pope Francis to beatify Pope John Paul I on that Sunday's mass in St. Peter's Square.
- 17 July – Pope Francis urged both parties in Sri Lanka to "seek a peaceful solution to the present crisis" and to "refrain from any form of violence" while re-management was taking place in the nation after former-President Gotabaya Rajapaksa's resignation from office was accepted by parliament on 15 July.
- 19 July – In a press release, the Secretariat for the Economy (SPE) announced a new unitary policy for the financial investments of the nation which would seek to be "more aligned" with the Church's teachings. The policy was set to go into effect on 1 September.

=== August ===
- 3 August - Weekly general audience led by pope Francis.
- 7 August - Angelus prayer in Vatican City.
- 10 August - General audience and a video message to missionaries in Argentina.
- 11 August - Funeral Mass for Jozef Tomko in Vatican City.
- 14 August - Angelus prayer.
- 15 August - Angelus for the feast of the assumption of Mary.
- 17 August - General audience and announcement of the upcoming consistory for the creation of the new cardinals.
- 18 August
  - Pope Francis sent €100,000 of monetary support to 400 families of victims and survivors of the 2019 Sri Lanka Easter bombings "out of his own volition," according to Archbishop of Colombo Cardinal Malcolm Ranjith, who expressed great gratitude towards the Pope.
  - Three Italian environmental activists who demanded the increase of solar and wind energy kept their hands attached to the base of the Laocoon in the Vatican Museum, also attaching a banner to the statue reading "No gas, No coal". The three were shortly arrested and sent to an Italian police station.
- 19 August – The Vitae Global Foundation announced it would conduct its first summit meeting inside the Vatican at the Casina Pio IV from 31 August to 1 September, with Pope Francis expected to participate in the event.
- 20 August – Pope Francis approved Father Francois Beyrouti as the new Melkite Greek Catholic Church leader in the United States. Beyrouti was chosen to fill the position back in June by the church, with the Pope's approval making the election valid.
- 21 August – In an address from St. Peter's Square, Pope Francis called for "open and sincere dialogue" in response to the 19 August raid of Nicaraguan Bishop Rolando Alvarez's residence, which led to police detaining several Catholic clergies critical of the president's administration.
- 27 August – Pope Francis swore in 21 new Cardinals, 16 of whom under the age of 80 years old.

=== September ===
- 29–30 September – The Dicastery for Laity, Family and Life hosted an international summit with the theme "Sports for All," with the goal to provide "cohesive, accessible and tailored" sports to everyone.

=== October ===
- 9 October – Pope Francis canonized Bishop Giovanni Battista Scalabrini and Artémides Zatti.

=== December ===
- 31 December – Pope Emeritus Benedict XVI, who served from 2005 until his resignation in 2013, dies at the age of 95.

== Deaths ==
- 31 December – Benedict XVI, 95, Pope (2005–2013) and archbishop of Munich and Freising (1977–1982).

== See also ==
- Roman Catholic Church
- COVID-19 pandemic in Europe
- 2022 in Europe
- City states
