= 2027 in Vatican City =

- Decades: 2000s; 2010s; 2020s
- See also: History of Vatican City; List of years in Vatican City

Events in the year 2027 in Vatican City.

== Incumbents ==
- Pope: Leo XIV

== Events ==
- 10 January – The end of the holy year of the Extraordinary Jubilee of St. Francis.

== Holidays ==
The holidays in Vatican City in 2027 will include:

- 1 January – Solemnity of Mary, Mother of God
- 6 January – Epiphany
- 11 February – Lateran Treaty
- 19 March – Saint Joseph's Day
- 28 March – Easter Sunday
- 29 March – Easter Monday
- 23 April – Saint George's Day
- 1 May – Saint Joseph the Worker
- 8 May – Anniversary of the election of Pope Leo XIV
- 29 June – Saints Peter and Paul
- 15 August – Assumption Day
- 8 September – Nativity of Mary
- 17 September – Feast Day of Saint Robert Bellarmine
- 1 November – All Saints' Day
- 8 December – Immaculate Conception
- 25 December – Christmas Day
- 26 December – Saint Stephen's Day

== See also ==
- Roman Catholic Church
- 2027 in Europe
- 2027 in religion
- City states
