= 2020 in Vatican City =

- Decades: 2000s; 2010s; 2020s
- See also: History of Vatican City; List of years in Vatican City

Events in the year 2020 in Vatican City.

== Incumbents ==
- Pope: Francis
- Cardinal Secretary of State: Pietro Parolin
- President of the Pontifical Commission: Giuseppe Bertello

== Events ==
Ongoing – COVID-19 pandemic in Vatican City

- 15 January – Francesca Di Giovanni is appointed undersecretary for multilateral affairs in the Secretariat of State, becoming the first woman to hold a management position.
- 6 March – The Vatican City reports its first case of COVID-19.
- 10 March – Saint Peter's Square and St. Peter's Basilica closes to tourists between 10 March and 3 April due to the lockdown in Italy.
- 27 March – Pope Francis delivers a special Urbi et Orbi blessing in an empty Saint Peter's Square, praying for the end of the coronavirus pandemic.
- 6 June – The Vatican announces that the last patient has recovered and that there are zero COVID-19 active cases in the state.
- 30 June – Police in Vatican City raid the department in charge of the maintenance and restoration of St. Peter's Basilica. The raid came due to suspicion of corruption in the awarding of building contracts.
- 16 September – Pope Francis appoints Bishop Mario Grech, the former Bishop of Gozo, as secretary-general of the Synod of Bishops.
- 6 October – The Vatican announces that facemasks are mandatory outdoors when social distancing isn't possible.
- 8 December – Pope Francis issues the apostolic letter Patris Corde ("With a Father's Heart") for the 150th anniversary of the declaration of Saint Joseph as patron of the universal Church. The Pope declares a special Year of St. Joseph (December 8, 2020 — December 8, 2021).

== Deaths ==
There have been no known deaths in Vatican City in the year 2020.

== See also ==
- Roman Catholic Church
- COVID-19 pandemic in Europe
- 2020 in the European Union
- City states
