= 1930 in Vatican City =

- Decades: 1910s; 1920s; 1930s; 1940s; 1950s
- See also: History of Vatican City; List of years in Vatican City

Events in the year 1930 in Vatican City.

== Incumbents ==
- Pope: Pius XI
- Cardinal Secretary of State: Pietro Gasparri (until 7 February), Eugenio Pacelli (since 9 February)
- Governor of Vatican City: Camillo Serafini

== Events ==
=== January–June ===
- Early February – Pope Pius XI "vigorously protests" in a letter addressed to the Soviet government against the persecution of religion in the Soviet Union, and asks the faithful throughout the world join him in praying for the end of the oppression.
- 6 February – Pope Pius XI issues a Motu Proprio establishing the "historical section" of the sacred congregation of rites.
- 7 February – Secretary of State Pietro Gasparri resigns from his position, prompting Pope Pius XI to appoint Cardinal Eugenio Pacelli as the new Secretary of State.
- 25 March – SoS Cardinal Pacelli becomes the archpriest of St. Peter's Basilica.

=== July–December ===
- 15 July
  - The quadrennial Marian Congress takes place in Lourdes, France, with Cardinal Jean Verdier serving as the Pope's Papal legate.
  - The National Congress of Prayer's Apostolate takes place in Braga, Portugal, with Cardinal Manuel Gonçalves Cerejeira serving as the Pope's Papal legate.
- 24 December – Pope Pius XI holds the Vatican's annual Christmas address in the Consistorial Hall in the Apostolic Palace.
- 31 December – Pope Pius XI publishes the Casti connubii, which condemns neo-paganism and supports the formal emancipation of women.

=== Unspecified date ===
- Early 1930 – The official English translation of the Pope Pius XI's encyclical on education is released.
- 1930–1933 – SoS Cardinal Eugenio Pacelli makes attempts to obtain a German treaty for protection and continued rights of the Catholic Church and her Priests in the nation with the representatives of successive German governments, which turn out ultimately unsuccessful.

== Deaths ==
There were no deaths in the year 1931 in Vatican City, and there would not be until the year 1961.

== See also ==
- Roman Catholic Church
- City states
