= 1929 in Vatican City =

- Decades: 1900s; 1910s; 1920s; 1930s; 1940s
- See also: History of Vatican City; List of years in Vatican City

Events in the year 1929 in Vatican City.

== Incumbents ==
- Pope: Pius XI
- Cardinal Secretary of State: Pietro Gasparri
- Governor of Vatican City: Camillo Serafini

== Events ==
=== February–June ===
- 11 February
  - The Lateran Treaty is signed by the Prime Minister and Head of Government of the Kingdom of Italy Benito Mussolini on behalf of King Victor Emmanuel III and by Cardinal Secretary of State Pietro Gasparri for Pope Pius XI.
  - The Vatican lira is introduced as the nation's official currency on par with the Italian lira.
- 13 February – The nation's postal system (Poste Vaticane) begins operations.
- 30 May – SoS Cardinal Pietro Gasparri asks Pope Pius XI to approve his signing of the Lateran Treaty.
- 7 June – The Lateran treaty goes into full effect, establishing the independent state of Vatican City and reaffirming the special status of Catholic Christianity in Italy.

=== July–December ===
- 1 August – The first nationally printed postal stamps are produced and released under the authority of the Philatelic and Numismatic Office of the Vatican City State.
- 16 December – Pope Pius XI appoints Manuel Gonçalves Cerejeira, Eugenio Pacelli, Luigi Lavitrano, Carlo Dalmazio Minoretti, Joseph Mac Rory, and Jean Verdier as cardinal priests.
- 19 December – All six new cardinal priests from 16 December receive their red hats and title.
- 31 December – Pope Pius XI publishes the Divini illius Magistri, which claims that Church and family have an inviolable and primary right to educate young people that precedes that of the State.

== Deaths ==
There is a very documented list of all of the people who have died in Vatican City, for being the smallest nation in the world and the head of the Catholic church. There were no deaths in the year 1929, and there would not be until the year 1961 with the death of Nicola Canali.

== See also ==
- Roman Catholic Church
- City states
