= 2021 in Vatican City =

- Decades: 2000s; 2010s; 2020s
- See also: History of Vatican City; List of years in Vatican City

Events in the year 2021 in Vatican City.

== Incumbents ==
- Pope: Francis
- Cardinal Secretary of State: Pietro Parolin
- President of the Pontifical Commission: Fernando Vérgez Alzaga

== Events ==
Ongoing – COVID-19 pandemic in Vatican City

=== January ===
- 9 January –
  - Pope Francis states that the vaccination campaign in the city-state will begin next week. He also confirms that he will take the vaccine himself.
  - Fabrizio Soccorsi, Pope Francis' personal physician, dies at a hospital in Rome due to "complications due to COVID-19".
- 13 January – On the first day of a COVID-19 vaccination campaign in the city-state, Pope Francis and Pope Emeritus Benedict XVI receive their firsts doses.

=== February ===
- 1 February – Cardinal Pietro Parolin, begins a week long visit to Cameroon.
- 22 February – The Vatican Press Office issues a statement to journalists accompanying Pope Francis on his trip to Iraq in March. All journalists will need to show a Certificate of Vaccination to prove vaccination against COVID-19.

=== March ===
- 15 March – The Congregation for the Doctrine of the Faith rules that priests cannot bless same-sex unions or marriages, describing such blessing "not licit".
- 20 March – The pope said that the International Eucharistic Congress of 2024 would be held in the Archdiocese of Quito in Ecuador.
- 24 March – Pope Francis issues a decree that cuts the 10% of the cardinals' and other officials' salaries due to the Vatican foreseeing a financial deficit of 50 million euros this year.

=== May ===
- 11 May – Pope Francis formally institutes the office of catechist as a ministry within the Church. With an apostolic letter entitled Antiquum Ministerium, released on May 11, the Pope establishes the lay ministry, and announces that the Vatican would soon publish a ritual for the commissioning of catechists.

=== July ===
- 16 July - Pope Francis issues the motu proprio, Traditionis custodes, which imposes new restrictions on use of the Tridentine Mass.

=== August ===
- 9 August – A barely legible letter to Pope Francis regarding the Vatican's financial scandals, which contained three bullets and is believed to have originated from France, is intercepted by postal workers in Peschiera Borromeo, near Milan. The letter is being treated by authorities as a possible death threat against Francis.
- 26 August – Pope Francis appoints Italian nun Alessandra Smerilli as Secretary of the Dicastery for Promoting Integral Human Development, becoming the first woman to do so.

=== September ===
- 1 September – Pope Francis defended an agreement with China allowing the appointment of new Catholic bishops, on the grounds that "uneasy dialogue is better than no dialogue at all", and recalling that in the Cold War era, talks with countries in Eastern Europe yielded positive results. The Vatican and China have had strained relations since the communist party took power in 1949.
- 20 September – The Vatican issues a decree that would require visitors to show proof of vaccination (Italian Green Pass or an immunity passport), or a negative test an beginning October 1.

=== October ===
- 5 October – The trial against Giovanni Angelo Becciu resumes. The Cardinal was fired by Pope Francis in 2020 after being accused of fraud and embezzlement.
- 31 October –Indian Prime Minister Narendra Modi is welcomed to the Vatican by Pope Francis.

=== November ===
- November –Raffaella Petrini is appointed secretary general of the Pontifical Commission for Vatican City State. She is the first woman to hold the position.
- Ignazio Cassis, the Swiss Foreign Minister meets with Cardinal Pietro Parolin to celebrate 100 years of diplomatic ties between the Vatican and Switzerland.

== Deaths ==
There have been no known deaths in Vatican City in the year 2021.

== See also ==
- Roman Catholic Church
- COVID-19 pandemic in Europe
- 2021 in the European Union
- City states
