= 2025 in religion =

This is a timeline of events during the year 2025 which relate to religion.

== Events ==
=== January ===
- 6 – The resignation of Justin Welby as Archbishop of Canterbury (since 2013) comes into effect. Welby announced his resignation on November 12, 2024 after the Makin Review criticised his failure to investigate allegations of abuse committed by John Smyth. Stephen Cottrell, Archbishop of York, serves as the acting leader of the Church of England until a new Archbishop of Canterbury is selected.
- 25 – Anastasios, Archbishop of Tirana, Durrës and All Albania and Primate of the Albanian Orthodox Church (since 1992), dies at the age of 95. Metropolitan John of Korça is elected Locum Tenens of the Archbishopric in an extraordinary session of the Holy Synod.

=== February ===
- 4 – Prince Karim Aga Khan IV, Imam of the Nizari (since 1957), dies at the age of 88. He is succeeded by his eldest son Prince Rahim Aga Khan V.
- 11 – Prince Rahim Aga Khan V officially accedes to the Nizari Imamate in a ceremony in Lisbon, Portugal.
- 28 – A suicide bombing at Darul Uloom Haqqania kills eight people, including the perpetrator. Among the dead is the target of the bombing, Islamic scholar Hamid Ul Haq Haqqani, who, since the assassination of his father in 2018, has served as Emir of the Pakistani Islamist party Jamiat Ulema-e-Islam (S).

=== March ===
- 16 – Metropolitan John of Korça is elected Archbishop of Tirana, Durrës and All Albania and Primate of the Albanian Orthodox Church by the Church's 7-member Holy Synod.
- 29 – John is officially enthroned as Archbishop of Tirana, Durrës and All Albania and Primate of the Albanian Orthodox Church in a ceremony in the Resurrection of Christ Orthodox Cathedral in Tirana, Albania.

=== April ===
- 15 – In the United States, The Arkansas governor Sarah Huckabee Sanders signs into law a bill that mandates the display of the Ten Commandments and In God We Trust in Arkansas classrooms.
- 21 - Pope Francis dies at the age of 88.

=== May ===
- 7 – The 2025 papal conclave begins.
- 8 –
  - The fourth ballot of the papal conclave elects a new pope after the second and third ballots failed earlier in the day.
  - American-born Cardinal Robert Francis Prevost is announced as the new pope, choosing the name Pope Leo XIV.
- 18 – The papal inauguration of Pope Leo XIV is held.

=== June ===
- 1 – Stassi D. Cramm is sustained as Prophet-President of Community of Christ at the denomination's annual World Conference in Independence, Missouri. She succeeds the retiring Stephen M. Veazey who has served in the role since 2005. Cramm, who had been nominated for the post in 2024, is the first woman to lead Community of Christ.
- 21 - In the United States, Texas Governor Greg Abbott signs a law that will require all public schools to display the Ten Commandments in their classrooms.
- 27 – Andy John, Archbishop of Wales and Bishop of Bangor, resigns after two reports alleged financial mismanagement and found a culture of excessive drinking, promiscuity and inappropriate language at Bangor Cathedral. John's resignation as Archbishop of Wales is immediate, while is resignation as Bishop of Bangor is effective August 31.

=== July ===
- 1 – At his 90th birthday celebrations in Dharamshala, India, the 14th Dalai Lama confirms that the office of Dalai Lama will continue after his death, his successor will be appointed by the Gaden Phodrang Trust with no input from the Chinese government, and reiterates that his successor will be born outside China. The Chinese government responds insisting that the next Dalai Lama must be approved by them.
- 4 – Erton Köhler unseats Ted N. C. Wilson as President of the General Conference of the Seventh-day Adventist Church at the Church's 62nd General Conference (GC) in St. Louis, Missouri. In the GC Nominating Committee Köhler was nominated with 170 votes against 104 for Wilson, who had served as President since 2010, and 3 abstentions. Köhler's name was then put to the 1,909 GC delegates for a confirmation vote. In this vote Köhler was approved as President 1,721 to 188.
- 7 – The United States Internal Revenue Service allows churches and other houses of worship to endorse political candidates without losing their tax-exempt status.

=== August ===
- 21 – The Polish Maków County council voted to accept a citizens' initiative, enthroning Jesus Christ as the "King of Powiat Maków" and declared 21 June as "Day of Jesus Christ King of the Powiat". The Voivodeship authorities would invalidated the law in September 2025.
- 26 – A committee recommends strengthening Quebec's religious symbol ban.
- 28 – The Coalition Avenir Québec government of Quebec announces it will ban public prayer in public places.

=== September ===
- 23 – Abdulaziz Al Sheikh, Grand Mufti of Saudi Arabia (since 1999), dies at the age of 84.
- 23 or 24 – #RaptureTok predicts the end of the world.
- 27 – Russell M. Nelson, President of The Church of Jesus Christ of Latter-day Saints (since 2018), dies at the age of 101.

=== October ===
- 1 – Yehiel Curry takes office as Presiding Bishop of the Evangelical Lutheran Church in America. His installation ceremony takes place on October 4. Curry is the first black person to hold the office.
- 3 – Sarah Mullally is announced as the new Archbishop of Canterbury, becoming the first woman to lead the Church of England and the Anglican Communion.
- 14 – Dallin H. Oaks becomes President of The Church of Jesus Christ of Latter-day Saints following a meeting of the Quorum of the Twelve Apostles in Salt Lake City. Oaks appoints Henry B. Eyring to serve as his First Counselor and D. Todd Christofferson as Second Counselor. Jeffrey R. Holland becomes President of the Quorum of the Twelve Apostles.

=== November ===
- 6 - Gérald Caussé is appointed to the Quorum of the Twelve Apostles of The Church of Jesus Christ of Latter-day Saints, to fill the vacancy caused by the death of Russell M. Nelson.
- 20 - Paul Mwazha, founder and leader of the African Apostolic Church (since the 1950s), dies at the age of 107.

=== December ===
- 27 - Jeffrey R. Holland, President of the Quorum of the Twelve Apostles of The Church of Jesus Christ of Latter-day Saints (since 2025) and a member of the Quorum (since 1994), dies aged 85.

== Religious holy days and observances ==
=== January ===
- 1 - Solemnity of Mary, Mother of God
- 6 - Epiphany
- 7 - Christmas Eastern Orthodox
- 14 - Guru Gobind Singh's birthday
- 14 - Pongal

=== February ===
- 26 - Maha Shivaratri
- 28 - Ramadan begins

=== March ===
- 5 - Ash Wednesday
- 13–14 – Purim
- 20–21 – Nowruz
- 25 - Feast of the Annunciation
- 29–30 – Eid al-Fitr
- 30 - Ramadan ends

=== April ===
- 6 - Rama Navami
- 12 - Passover begins
- 13 – Palm Sunday
- 13 – Vaisakhi
- 17 - Holy Thursday
- 18 - Good Friday (in both the Gregorian and Julian calendars)
- 20 - Easter (in both the Gregorian and Julian calendars)
- 20 - Passover ends

=== May ===
- 12 - Vesak
- 29 - Feast of the Ascension

=== June ===
- 1-3 - Shavuot
- 6–7 – Eid al-Adha
- 7 - Feast of the Sacred Heart
- 8 - Pentecost
- 15 - Trinity Sunday
- 22 – Corpus Christi
- 24 – Nativity of St. John the Baptist
- 29 – Feast of Saints Peter and Paul

=== July ===
- 16–17 – Ashura
- 31 – Feast of St. Ignatius Loyola

=== August ===
- 12–13 – Tisha B'Av
- 15 – Feast of the Assumption of Mary
- 16 – Krishna Janmashtami
- 21 – Paryushana

=== September ===
- 5 – Mawlid-al-Nabi

=== October ===
- 2–4 – Rosh Hashanah
- 11–12 – Yom Kippur
- 17 – Sukkot
- 21 - Diwali
- 23–24 – Shemini Atzeret
- 24–25 – Simchat Torah

=== November ===
- 1 - All Saints' Day
- 2 - All Souls' Day
- 2 - International Day of Prayer for the Persecuted Church
- 5 – Guru Nanak Gurpurab
- 16 – Remembering the Martyrs of the UCA
- 23 – Feast of Christ the King
- 30 – Advent Season

=== December ===
- 3 – Feast of St. Francis Xavier
- 8 – Immaculate Conception
- 12 – Feast of Our Lady of Guadalupe
- 25 - Christmas
- 25 - Hanukkah Begins
- 26–1 – Kwanzaa

== See also ==
- 2025 in Vatican City
- Religion and the Russian invasion of Ukraine
