= 1931 in Vatican City =

- Decades: 1910s; 1920s; 1930s; 1940s; 1950s
- See also: History of Vatican City; List of years in Vatican City

Events in the year 1931 in Vatican City.

== Incumbents ==
- Pope: Pius XI
- Cardinal Secretary of State: Eugenio Pacelli
- Governor of Vatican City: Camillo Serafini

== Events ==
=== January–June ===
- 12 February – Vatican Radio is formally established and inaugurated by Pope Pius XI and Guglielmo Marconi.
- 26 April – Pope Pius XI writes a chirograph titled Dobbiamo Intrattenerlato ("We must Entertain Her") to the Archbishop of Milan Alfredo Ildefonso Schuster, defending the purpose of the now-disassembled Italian Catholic Action, and correcting any misconceptions.
- 15 May – Pope Pius XI publishes the minor encyclical Quadragesimo anno ("Fortieth year"), which restates the points of the encyclical Rerum novarum of Pope Leo XIII in illustrating the complex relationship between companies and workers that characterize "social Catholicism".
- 29 June – Pope Pius XI publishes the first of three major encyclicals titled the Non Abbiamo Bisogno ("We Do Not Need to Acquaint You"), which challenges totalitarian government's policies against Christian values, referencing mainly Fascist Italy in his text.

=== July–December ===
- 2 September – The letters of protest directed towards the Fascist Italian government in the Dobbiamo Intrattenerla and Non Abbiamo Bisogno obtain partial success, with an agreement being signed with the Italian government recognizing again the Italian Catholic Action, but in a weaker diocesan form without a central direction.
- 2 October – Pope Pius XI publishes the minor encyclical Nova impendet ("New Questions Threaten"), in which he addresses the Great Depression economic crisis affecting many unemployed workers partnered with the rise in military spending among nations.
- 25 December – Pope Pius XI publishes the minor encyclical Lux Veritatis ("Light of Truth"), which discusses the heresy of Nestorius and reaffirms the divine motherhood of Mary towards the Council of Ephesus.

=== Unspecified date ===
- 1930–1933 – SoS Cardinal Eugenio Pacelli makes attempts to obtain German a treaty for protection and continued rights of the Catholic Church and her Priests in the nation with the representatives of successive German governments, which turn out ultimately unsuccessful.

== Deaths ==
There were no deaths in the year 1931 in Vatican City.

== See also ==
- Roman Catholic Church
- City states
