= 2024 in religion =

This is a timeline of events during the year 2024 which relate to religion.

== Events ==
- 2 April – The Dignitas Infinita is declared, condemning violations of human dignity.
- May 2 - In Canada, The National Assembly of Quebec votes to renewal Bill 21 (a law which bars public servants from wearing religious symbols while on duty) by using the notwithstanding clause for five more years until 2029. The assembly vote was 83 for and 26 opposed. Coalition Avenir Québec (CAQ) and Parti Québécois (PQ) vote yes, while the Quebec Liberal Party and Québec solidaire vote against.
- 14–19 June – At least 1300 people die because of extreme heat during the Hajj.
- June 19 – In the United States, Louisiana Governor Jeff Landry signs a bill that makes it the first state to mandate that the Ten Commandments be displayed in every public school classroom.

== Religious holy days and observances ==
=== January ===
- 1 - Solemnity of Mary, Mother of God
- 6 - Epiphany
- 7 - Christmas Eastern Orthodox
- 17 - Guru Gobind Singh's birthday

=== February ===
- 14 - Ash Wednesday

=== March ===
- 8 - Maha Shivaratri
- 10 - Ramadan begins
- 20–21 – Nowruz
- 23 – Purim
- 24 – Palm Sunday
- 25 - Feast of the Annunciation
- 28 - Holy Thursday
- 29 - Good Friday
- 31 - Easter

=== April ===
- 9 - Ramadan ends
- 9–10 – Eid al-Fitr
- 13 – Vaisakhi
- 17 - Rama Navami
- 22 - Passover begins
- 30 - Passover ends

=== May ===
- 3 - Orthodox Good Friday
- 5 - Orthodox Easter Sunday
- 9 - Feast of the Ascension
- 19 - Pentecost
- 23 - Vesak
- 26 - Trinity Sunday
- 30 – Corpus Christi

=== June ===
- 7 - Feast of the Sacred Heart
- 11-13 - Shavuot
- 16–17 – Eid al-Adha
- 24 – Nativity of St. John the Baptist
- 29 – Feast of Saints Peter and Paul

=== July ===
- 16–17 – Ashura
- 31 – Feast of St. Ignatius Loyola

=== August ===
- 12–13 – Tisha B'Av
- 15 – Feast of the Assumption of Mary
- 26 – Krishna Janmashtami

=== September ===
- 7 – Paryushana
- 16 – Mawlid-al-Nabi

=== October ===
- 2–4 – Rosh Hashanah
- 11–12 – Yom Kippur
- 17 – Sukkot
- 23–24 – Shemini Atzeret
- 24–25 – Simchat Torah

=== November ===
- 1 - All Saints' Day
- 1 - Diwali
- 2 - All Souls' Day
- 15 – Guru Nanak Gurpurab
- 16 – Remembering the Martyrs of the UCA
- 24 – Feast of Christ the King

=== December ===
- 1 – Advent Season
- 3 – Feast of St. Francis Xavier
- 8 – Immaculate Conception
- 12 – Feast of Our Lady of Guadalupe
- 25 - Christmas
- 25 - Hanukkah Begins
- 26–1 – Kwanzaa

== See also ==
- 2024 in Vatican City
- Religion and the Russian invasion of Ukraine
