= 2026 in Vatican City =

- Decades: 2000s; 2010s; 2020s
- See also: History of Vatican City; List of years in Vatican City

Events in the year 2026 in Vatican City.

== Incumbents ==
- Pope: Leo XIV

== Events ==
=== January ===
- 6 January – The end of the 2025 Jubilee.

=== March ===
- 12 March – Pope Leo XIV appoints Archbishop Luis Marín de San Martín of Spain as Prefect of the Dicastery for the Service of Charity, replacing Konrad Krajewski, who is reassigned as Archbishop of Łódź in Poland.
- 17 March – The Apostolic Signatura declares a mistrial in the financial misconduct case against Cardinal Giovanni Angelo Becciu due to procedural errors by the prosecution and then-Pope Francis and orders a new trial scheduled on 22 June.

=== May ===
- 25 May – Pope Leo XIV issues his first encyclical, Magnifica Humanitas, which expresses concerns about artificial intelligence.

=== June ===
- 2 June — Pope Leo XIV appoints EWTN News president Maria Montserrat Alvarado as head of the Dicastery for Communication.

=== October ===
- 8 October — Luis Antonio Tagle is elected as Dean of the College of Cardinals.
- 13 October — The Vatican announces that Pope Leo XIV underwent surgery which verified that he has lung cancer and removed the bottom lobe of his right lung.

== Holidays ==
The holidays in Vatican City in 2026 will include:

- 1 January – Solemnity of Mary, Mother of God
- 6 January – Epiphany
- 11 February – Lateran Treaty
- 19 March – Saint Joseph's Day
- 5 April – Easter Sunday
- 6 April – Easter Monday
- 23 April – Saint George's Day
- 1 May – Saint Joseph the Worker
- 8 May – Anniversary of the election of Pope Leo XIV
- 29 June – Saints Peter and Paul
- 15 August – Assumption Day
- 8 September – Nativity of Mary
- 17 September – Feast Day of Saint Robert Bellarmine
- 1 November – All Saints' Day
- 8 December – Immaculate Conception
- 25 December – Christmas Day
- 26 December – Saint Stephen's Day

== See also ==
- Roman Catholic Church
- 2026 in Europe
- 2026 in religion
- City states
