= 2014 in Vatican City =

- Decades: 1990s; 2000s; 2010s; 2020s
- See also: History of Vatican City; List of years in Vatican City

Events from the year 2014 in Vatican City.

== Incumbents ==
- Pope: Francis

== Events ==
=== January ===
- 5 January – 50th anniversary of the meeting between Pope Paul VI and Patriarch Athenagoras I of Constantinople. An international trip for Pope Francis is announced for the Holy Land to meet Bartholomew I.
- 12 January – Announcement of the creation of 19 new cardinals: 16 eligible to vote in future papal conclaves and 3 non-voting cardinals.

=== February ===
- 17–19 February – The 3rd meeting of the Council of Cardinal Advisers. This council was the first attended by Cardinal Pietro Parolin.
- 22 February – 19 new cardinals elevated by Pope Francis in the presence of Pope Emeritus Benedict XVI.
- 24 February – Establishment of the Secretariat for the Economy.

=== March ===
- 8 March – The nomination for five years of the 15 members of the Secretariat for the Economy.
- 22 March – Creation of the Pontifical Commission for the Protection of Minors.

=== April ===
- 3 April – The equivalent canonizations of José de Anchieta, Marie of the Incarnation and Francis-Xavier de Montmorency-Laval.
- 27 April – Canonization of Pope John XXIII and Pope John Paul II in the presence of Pope Emeritus Benedict XVI
- 28–30 April – The 4th meeting of the Council of Cardinal Advisers.

=== July ===
- 1–4 July – The 5th meeting of the Council of Cardinal Advisers.

=== September ===
- 15–17 September – The 6th meeting of the Council of Cardinal Advisers.

=== October ===
- 5–19 October – Extraordinary General Synod of Bishops on the topic of the pastoral challenges to the family.
- 19 October – Beatification of Pope Paul VI.

=== November ===
- 23 November – The canonization of Giovanni Antonio Farina, Kuriakose Elias Chavara, Ludovico of Casoria, Nicholas Longobardi, Amato Ronconi and Euphrasia Eluvathingal.

=== December ===
- 20 December – nomination of Jean-Louis Tauran as vice-camerlengo of the Roman Catholic church.

== See also ==
- Roman Catholic Church
- 2014 in Europe
- City states
