= 2025 in Vatican City =

- Decades: 2000s; 2010s; 2020s
- See also: History of Vatican City; List of years in Vatican City

Events in the year 2025 in Vatican City.

== Incumbents ==
- Pope:

Francis (until April 21)
Leo XIV (from May 8)

- Cardinal Secretary of State: Pietro Parolin
- President of the Pontifical Commission: Raffaella Petrini

== Events ==
=== Ongoing ===
- 2025 Jubilee

=== January ===
- 6 January – Sister Simona Brambilla becomes the first woman appointed to head a dicastery, the Dicastery for Institutes of Consecrated Life and Societies of Apostolic Life.
- 10 January – Homosexuals can now be allowed to become priests.

=== February ===
- 14 February – Pope Francis is admitted at Gemelli Hospital in Rome due to breathing difficulties; diagnosed with bronchitis and later pneumonia.

=== March ===
- 1 March – Sister Raffaella Petrini becomes the first woman to become President of the Pontifical Commission for Vatican City State and President of the Governorate of Vatican City State.

=== April ===
- 21 April – Pope Francis dies at the age of 88.

=== May ===
- May 7 – The 2025 papal conclave begins.
- May 8 –
  - The fourth ballot of the papal conclave elects a new pope after the second and third ballots failed earlier in the day. American-born Cardinal Robert Francis Prevost is announced as the new pope, choosing the name Leo XIV.
- May 18 – The papal inauguration of Pope Leo XIV is held.

=== July ===
- 31 July – The Italian government signs an agreement with the Holy See to convert the 430-hectare rural site of Santa Maria Galeria north of Rome into a solar farm as part of efforts by the Vatican City to generate its energy needs and become a carbon-neutral state.

=== September ===
- 6–7 September – The first official pilgrimage by members of the LGBT community to the Vatican City is held as part of the 2025 Jubilee.
- 7 September – Italy's Carlo Acutis and Pier Giorgio Frassati are canonized as saints of the Roman Catholic Church by Pope Leo XIV at an open-air mass in Saint Peter's Square.
- 25 September – The Apostolic Signatura rejects an appeal by prosecutors against the acquittal of Cardinal Giovanni Angelo Becciu and nine others accused of embezzling 350 million euros ($410 million) in church funds in 2023.

=== October ===
- 2 October – The Swiss Guard releases a new uniform to be used on nonceremonial, formal occasions including diplomatic receptions and official dinners outside the Vatican.
- 19 October – Pope Leo XIV canonizes seven new saints (José Gregorio Hernández, Carmen Elena Rendiles Martínez, Ignatius Maloyan, Vincenza Maria Poloni, Maria Troncatti, Bartolo Longo and Peter To Rot) at an open-air mass in Saint Peter's Square.
- 23 October – King Charles III and Pope Leo XIV hold the first joint prayer between a British monarch and a Catholic pope since 1534, at the Sistine Chapel.

=== November ===
- 15 November – Pope Leo XIV formally returns 62 indigenous artefacts taken from Canada and held in the Vatican's Anima Mundi museum to the Canadian Conference of Catholic Bishops on behalf of members of the First Nations community.
- 21 November – Pope Leo XIV signs an amendment to the 2023 law allowing women to become President of the Pontifical Commission, removing a requirement that would-be officeholders must hold the rank of cardinal.

== Holidays ==
- 1 January – Solemnity of Mary, Mother of God
- 6 January – Epiphany
- 11 February – Lateran Treaty
- 13 March – Anniversary of the election of Pope Francis
- 19 March – Saint Joseph's Day
- 20 April – Easter Sunday
- 21 April – Easter Monday
- 21 April – (Death of Pope Francis)
- 23 April – Saint George's Day
- 1 May – Saint Joseph the Worker
- 8 May – (Election of Pope Leo XIV)
- 29 June – Saints Peter and Paul
- 15 August – Assumption Day
- 8 September – Nativity of Mary
- 17 September – Feast Day of Saint Robert Bellarmine
- 1 November – All Saints' Day
- 8 December – Immaculate Conception
- 25 December – Christmas Day
- 26 December – Saint Stephen's Day

== See also ==
- Roman Catholic Church
- 2025 in Europe
- 2025 in religion
- City states
