= 2018 in Vatican City =

- Decades: 1990s; 2000s; 2010s; 2020s
- See also: History of Vatican City; List of years in Vatican City

Events in the year 2018 in Vatican City.

== Incumbents ==
- Pope: Francis
- Cardinal Secretary of State: Pietro Parolin
- President of the Pontifical Commission: Giuseppe Bertello

== Events ==
- 14 February – High-level delegations from the Vatican and the Patriarchate of Moscow meet in Vienna discussing the gains in ecumenical work in the two years since Pope Francis met in Havana with Russian Orthodox Patriarch Kirill.
- 14 June – Cardinal Pietro Parolin addresses participants in the Second Holy See – Mexico Conference on International Migration. The Vatican Secretary of State assesses the current political climate, calls for the humane treatment of migrants and discusses the “primary right” to live with dignity in one's home country.
- 22 September – The Vatican signs a provisional agreement with China on the process used to appoint bishops, a breakthrough after years of contentious negotiations on the management of Catholic leadership in the communist country.
- 5 November – Pope Francis, threatens to order the abdication of Andorran co-monarch Joan Enric Vives Sicília, Archbishop-Bishop of Urgell, if the country decriminalises or legalises abortion.

== See also ==
- Roman Catholic Church
- COVID-19 pandemic in Europe
- 2018 in the European Union
- City states
