= Oratory of Santissimo Crocifisso =

Oratorio del Santissimo Crocifisso
- Oratory of the Most Holy Crucifix
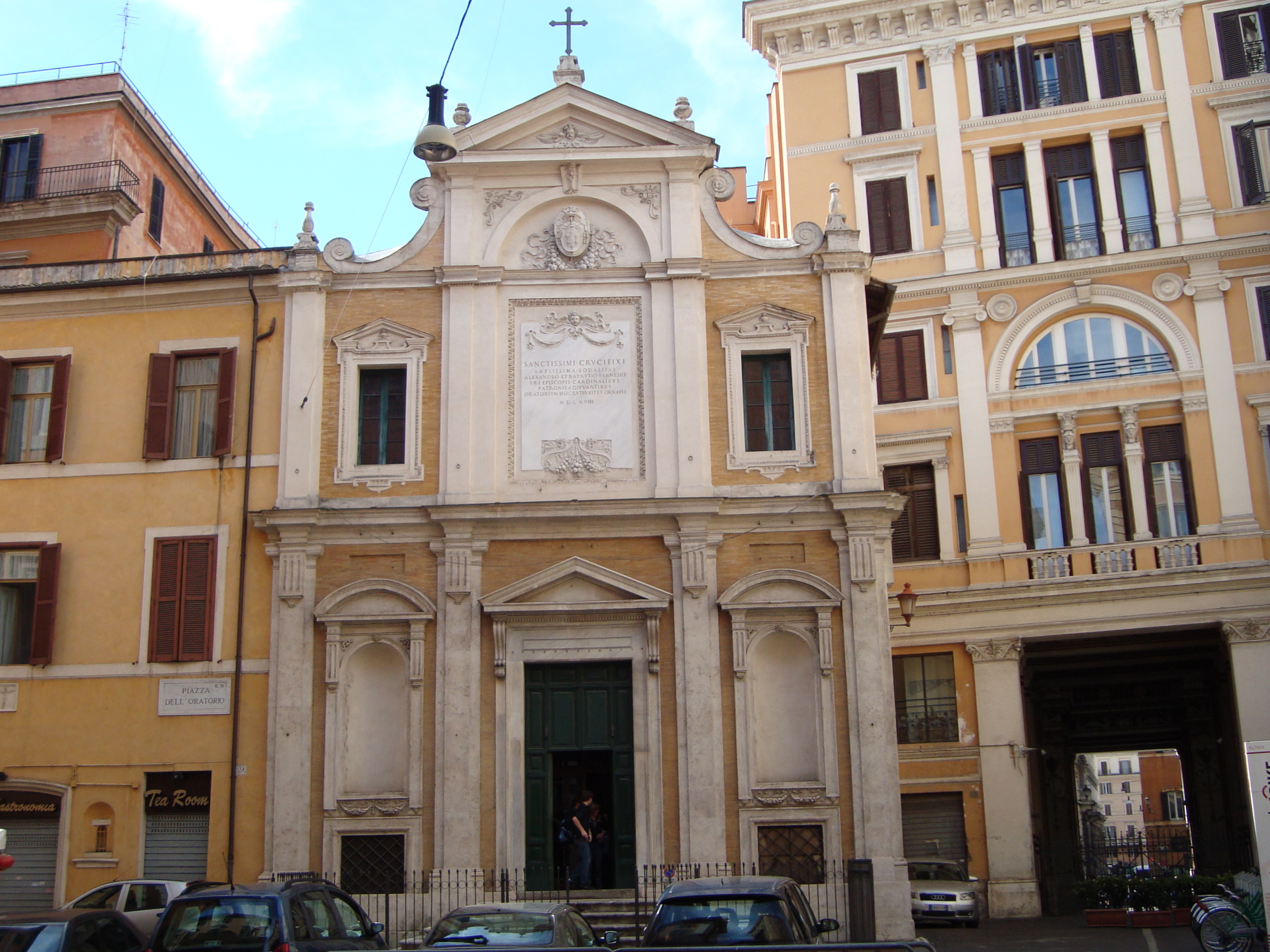
- The Oratory of Santissimo Crocifisso.
- Click on the map for a fullscreen view
- 41°53′59″N 12°28′55″E
- Location: Rome
- Country: Italy

Architecture
- Architect: Giacomo Della Porta
- Completed: 1568

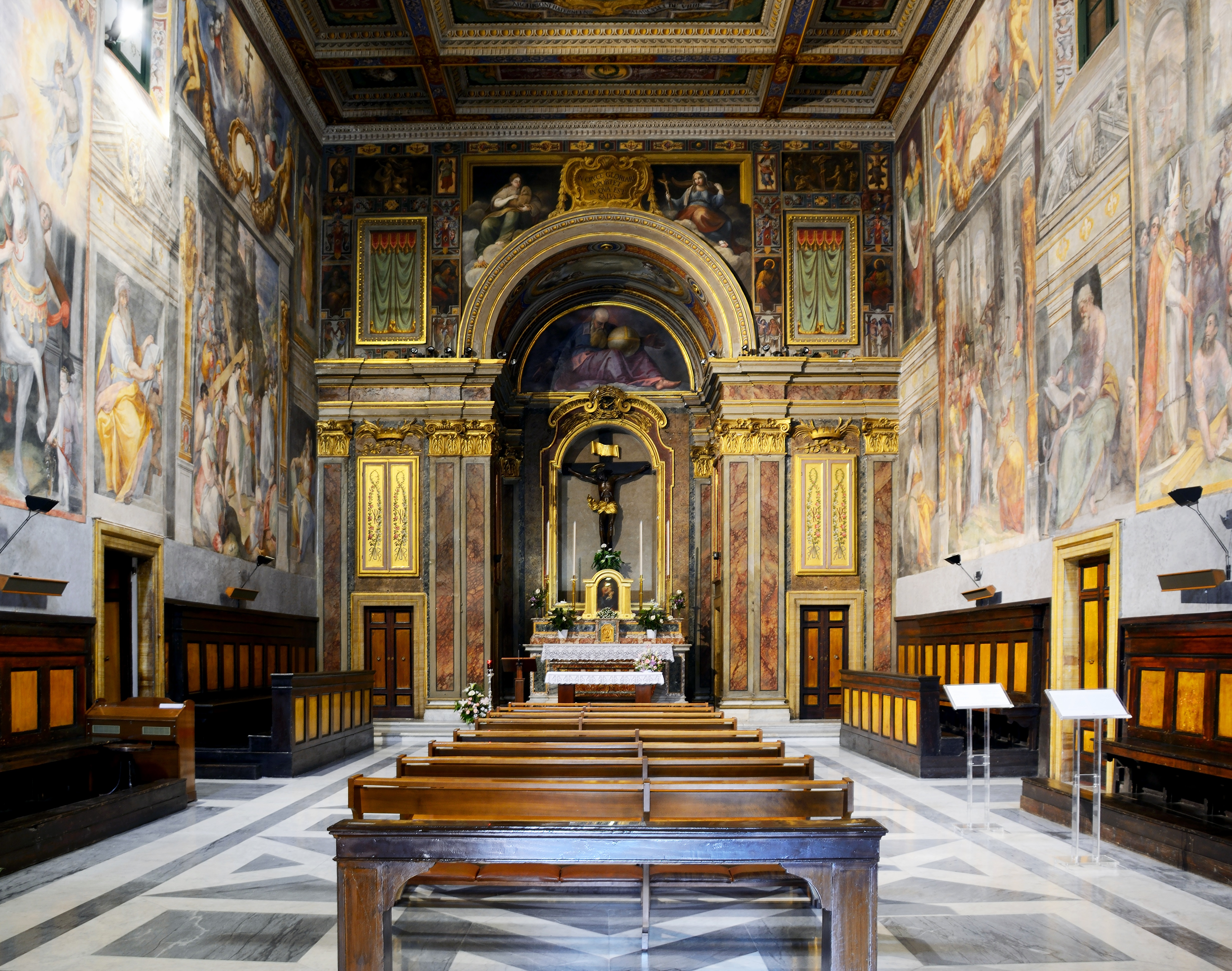
Interior of the Oratory of Santissimo Crocifisso.

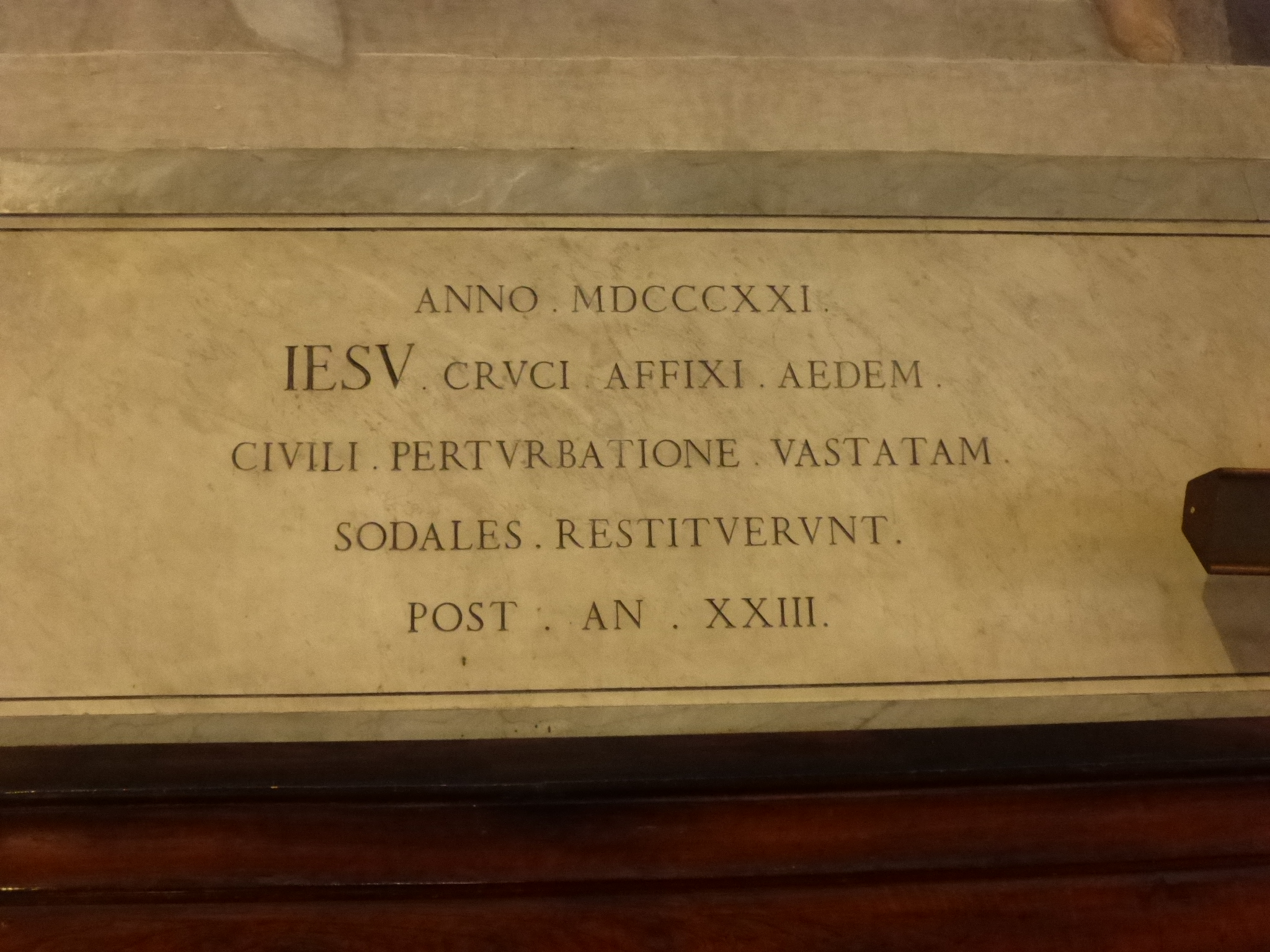
This epigraph remembers the memory of the restoration in 1821

The Oratorio del Santissimo Crocifisso or the Oratory of the Most Holy Crucifix is a building in central Rome, Italy. Connected to the nearby church of San Marcello al Corso, it houses the Crucifix of San Marcello and served as a chapel and meeting place for the Archconfraternity of the Most Holy Crucifix (Arciconfraternita del Santissimo Crocifisso in Urbe) devoted to the image. It is best known, like the Oratorio del Gonfalone, which shares the same artists, for its Mannerist decorations.

The structure was built by Giacomo Della Porta in 1568, near the church of San Marcello. The confraternity was composed of some of the richest men in Rome, including the cardinals Ranuccio and Alessandro Farnese, nephews of the Pope. The theme of the interior decoration is the Triumph of the Cross. It employed Giovanni de' Vecchi, Cesare Nebbia, Niccolò Circignani, and Cristoforo Roncalli.

It was also host of musical concerts, starting in 1639, when the first performances of fifteen musical oratorios by Giacomo Carissimi and Emilio de' Cavalieri occurred here.

It was damaged during the end of the 18th century. It was restored in 1821, as documented in an epigraph.

== See also ==
- San Marcello al Corso
- The Miraculous plague cure of 1522 is attributed to the processioning of the crucifix.
