= Crucifix of San Marcello =

Crucifix associated with the 1522 plague epidemic in Rome

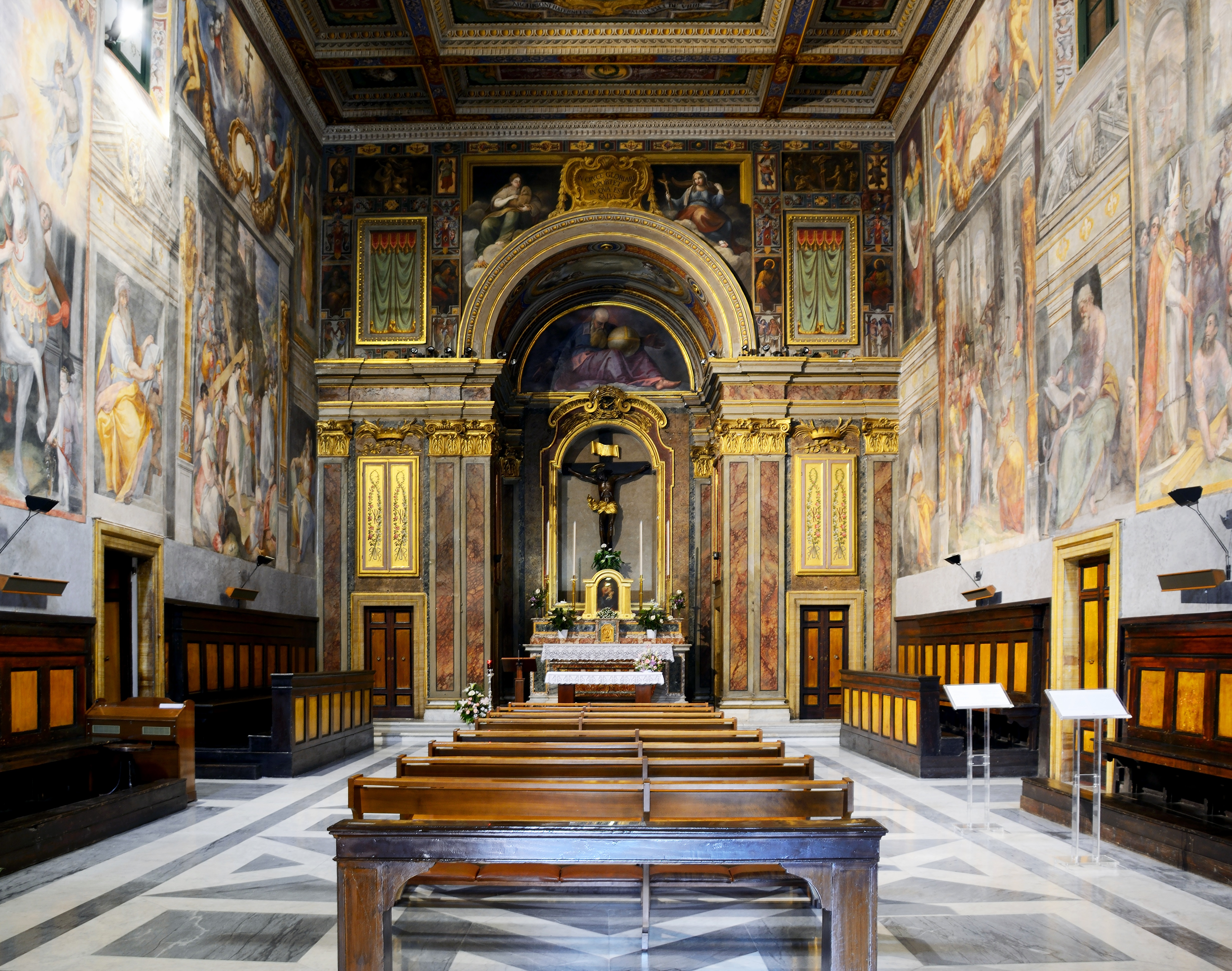
Interior of the Oratory of Santissimo Crocifisso illustrating its murals and crucifix

The crucifix of San Marcello is a medieval work of religious art that is venerated in the Oratory of Santissimo Crocifisso of the Church of San Marcello al Corso in Rome. Having survived a fire that destroyed the church in 1519, the crucifix was popularly believed to possess intercessory powers. During an epidemic of plague in 1522 the crucifix was carried in a procession through the city. According to popular belief at the time, the procession caused the plague to leave the neighborhoods through which the crucifix passed, and eventually to die out in Rome.

Because contemporaries then believed that the crucifix had proven its spiritual efficacy twice, a confraternity was set up which quickly became one of the largest in Rome. The procession of 1522 is considered by some scholars to be the origin of modern Holy Thursday processions held annually in Catholic cities, and the crucifix itself is still part of modern Roman religious processionary, particularly at Easter, although also at times of emergency. Pope Francis had it brought to St Peter's Square on several occasions during the COVID-19 pandemic in March 2020.

== Background ==
Epidemics of plague had been occurring continuously in Europe since the Black Death and the beginning of the Second plague pandemic in the 14th century, and Italy had rarely gone more than a few years without an outbreak. (Note: The historian Arthur White has calculated that the peninsula had experienced 127 outbreaks over the last 175 years.) It was "the most perennial of medieval threats". The scholar Daniel McCann notes that when the plague reached Rome in 1522, it took hold of the popular imagination to the extent that many blamed Pope Adrian VI for the outbreak. Adrian had recently arrived from Spain, and it was assumed that he had brought the pestilence with him. (Note: Adrian was to remain associated with plague for the remainder of his pontificate: one contemporary wrote how having rid itself of one pest—the plague—it had gained another, the Pope. After Adrian's death, the poet Antonio Tebaldeo wrote a faux-epitaph for him: "Here lies Adrian. Be careful not to touch his throne, whoever succeeds him. He was a plague.") Some of the population was able to leave Rome in time; most were not. This outbreak was the second most deadly to reach Rome in the 16th century.

== Plague ==
When the second plague pandemic hit Rome again in 1522, the local authorities banned processions so as to stop the disease spreading. However, some Catholics made a 16-day procession with a crucifix from S. Marcello al Corso, through the streets of Rome, to St Peter's Basilica. As a processional cross they carried the wooden crucifix now housed in the Oratory of Santissimo Crocifisso. This crucifix was thought to be miraculous because it had survived a fire in 1519.

=== The crucifix ===
The crucifix, notes Anna Somers Cocks in The Art Newspaper, when viewed objectively and stripped of its religious context, is "rather ordinary, one of hundreds of workmanlike crucifixes" created by an unknown sculptor probably toward the end of the 14th century. (Note: Cocks notes that it is similar to another crucifix in San Lorenzo, which itself may have been brought from Northern Europe.) On the night of 25 May 1519 it was nearly destroyed in a fire. The fire burned the interior of the church to the ground; residents found only the outer walls still standing. The crucifix—still alight—was almost the only recoverable item of note, while many valuable artworks, liturgical items and vestments were destroyed. Because the crucifix—although deformed by the heat—had survived the flames, it was believed to possess thaumaturgical powers, a belief that was further enhanced by its perceived role in ridding the city of plague in 1522. Following the fire, Romans venerated the cross in the church's ruins every Friday evening.

The crucifix survives into the 21st century, and usually has hung above the altar's tabernacle. Made of wood and dusted with gold, it is probably a product of the Sienese School of art. McCann notes, however, that unlike other crucifixes in Rome—which are ubiquitous on account of the importance the symbol plays in Christian theology—this one possessed "darker tones and hues" than most. This particular crucifix's origins were surrounded by "disturbing rumours", one of which claimed that the original sculptor, wishing to make his Christ figure as realistic as possible, kidnapped a local peasant and killed him slowly. The sculptor sketched the peasant's dying moments, it was claimed, for authenticity in representing Christ's death agonies. Although almost certainly a myth, argues McCann—probably designed to boost the object's reputation—it illustrates how, to the medieval popular imagination, plague and healing, life and death were inextricably linked in the crucifix.

== Procession ==
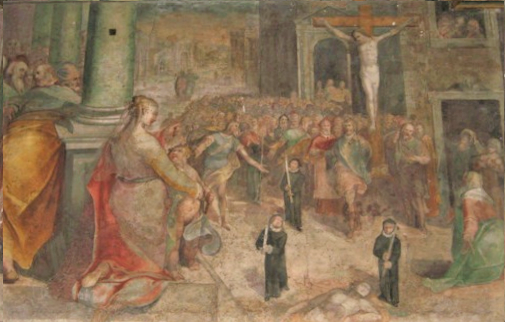
Paris Nogari, Procession of the Crucifix Against the Plague of 1522 (1583–84), Oratorio del Crocifisso fresco

In response to popular clamour, Cardinal Raimondo de Vico arranged a penitential procession from San Marcello to St Peter's. This was a particularly bold move, suggests McCann, reflecting the desire of the citizenry who remained in Rome to be proactive rather than merely await death quietly. The French religious historian Jean Delumeau describes it as, effectively, a "neo-pagan demonstration". Led by friars of the Servants of Mary, the procession began on August 4 and ended on August 20, and comprised members of the nobility and churchmen alongside ordinary Roman citizens (wearing black habits and carrying crosses), as well as "barefoot youths with their heads covered in ashes", notes Kira Albinsky. As the procession passed, the Romans implored the crucifix to intercede on the city's behalf with calls of "Mercy, Holy Crucifix!" while flagellating themselves. The city authorities, mindful of contagion, attempted unsuccessfully to halt the procession.

According to local tradition, as the crucifix toured a neighbourhood, the people of that neighbourhood were allegedly cured of the Black Death, so that each neighbourhood sought to have the crucifix stay with them as long as possible. By the time the crucifix reached St Peter's, the plague had begun to ebb in the city, and eventually in the whole Italian Peninsula. (Note: Although not for long, as another wave swept Florence in March the following year.) Contemporaries saw this as a miracle in which the crucifix played a key role. According to contemporary chroniclers, the reason for the long duration of the procession despite the relatively short distance between the church and the Vatican was that each district attempted to delay the crucifix due to the good it was doing.

Cardinal de Vico established a confraternity to promote its cult. The crucifix's power, comments Delumeau, was now twice proven in people's eyes.

== Later events ==
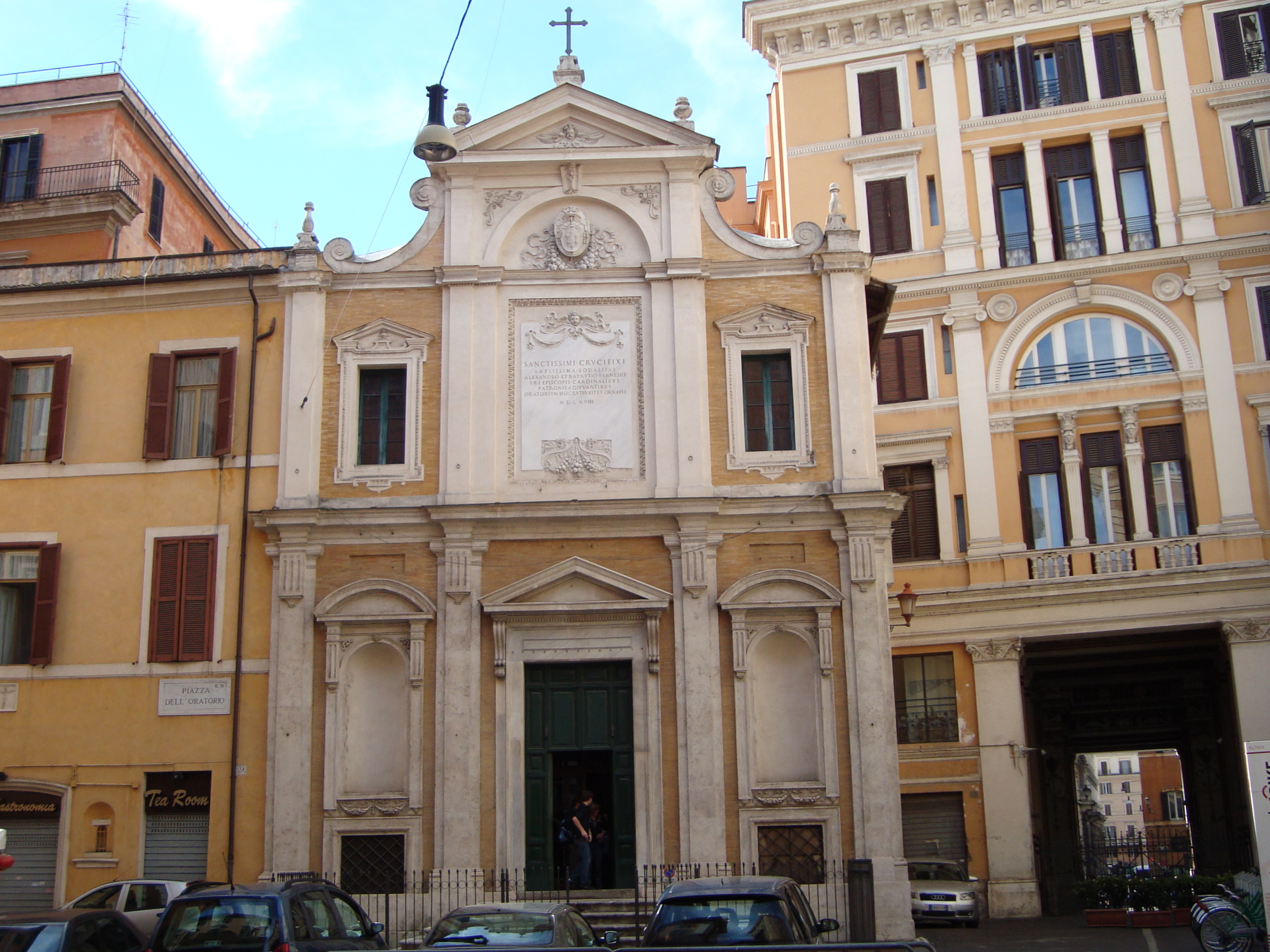
External view of the Oratory of Santissimo Crocifisso where the cross is in place today

The confraternity formed to promote the crucifix, says Albinsky, soon became one of Rome's "most elite and influential". It based its uniform—black habits with an image of the crucifix on the left shoulder—on the dress of many who originally marched. By the middle of the 16th century, its membership had increased exponentially, and Albinsky estimates that 4% of the city's population were members. (Note: Specifically, 1,800 men, an unknown number of women, and an "even greater share of the laity in a city dominated by clerics", comments Albinsky.) The crucifix itself was protected, venerated and its stories promulgated by its sodality, which also limited physical access to it in order to heighten the mysticism surrounding it. The confraternity's standing orders stated that:

So that more honoured, and with more devotion and greatness to His holy name, it be desired to see it, we order and decree that the most holy image of the most holy crucifix be kept closed with its keys and not opened but for four times a year. Good Friday, the Feast of the Cross in May, the day of the procession of Corpus Christi, and the Feast of the Cross in September.

The crucifix was also led in procession to celebrate the return of England to the Catholic church under Queen Mary I in 1554. The crucifix has since been carried in processions during the Jubilees, and the names of the popes who called each Jubilee were written on the back of it.

Contemporary Frescos on the oratory walls commemorating the founding of the confraternity—the Miraculous Survival of the Crucifix from the Fire in San Marcello and Procession of the Crucifix Against the Plague in 1522—reside in the church's oratory. Every Easter since 1650 the crucifix has been carried from the church to St Peter's on the Thursday of Holy Week. It has also been brought out on occasions of political and social emergency.

=== 21st-century use ===
Pope John Paul II embraced the crucifix in the Jubilee Year of 2000.

On 15 March 2020, Pope Francis prayed before the crucifix for an end to the COVID-19 pandemic. The Pope blessed Rome in what The Art Newspaper describes as a "scene of great dramatic power, at dusk, under driving rain, and facing the vast emptiness of St Peter’s Square". Behind him, against two columns of St Peter's Basilica, were two artworks. The Art Newspaper suggests that in this situation they were not actual pieces of art, but rather were protective icons that were being put to the same use as they had been hundreds of years earlier. (Note: The other piece present in St Peter's Square was a portrait. Alongside the crucifix was the painting Maria Salus Populi Romani, traditionally believed to have been painted by Luke the Evangelist in Jerusalem. It is a Virgin and Child painted on cloth applied to panels of limewood, with a frame of ash. When it was restored by Vatican conservators in 2017, radiocarbon analysis dated the wood with 80% certainty to some time between the late 9th and early 11th centuries. Cocks suggests that in a spiritual sense it was also "Rome's most venerated image of Mary"; it was carried in a procession by Gregory the Great during the Roman Plague of 590, also in a call for a plague to leave Rome.)

Cocks asks, hypothetically, "Does this mean that he [Pope Francis] believes they are capable of bringing about a miracle?", to which she replies in the negative. The Catholic Church, she says, has firm rules against idolatry, which would apply if one attributes holy powers to a temporal object. Francis, says Cocks, was praying to God through Marian intercession, "as represented by the two works of art". (Note: Cocks notes also that it is rarely, if ever, the famous and expensive icons that receive such popular veneration; rather, she says, "it is the old, often strange or downright ugly pictures or statues to which legends and events have become attached".) The art historian Liz Lev has commented that some of the recent reports on the crucifix almost "run the risk of idolatry", because they suggest that "the object itself is more important than what the object stands for".

The crucifix was again utilised on 27 March 2020 in an urbi et orbi prayer in St Peter's Square, (Note: Urbi et orbi ("to the city and the world") prayers are usually only offered at Easter and Christmas.) which was empty due to the Italian COVID-19 lockdown. Due to the heavy rain which fell during the event, there were concerns that the old wood had been damaged, but the rector of San Marcellus, Enrico Casini, believed that the damage was minimal and that, although the crucifix had been sent for examination, it was not expected to be gone long. It was suspected that the old wood had become waterlogged and split, the stucco paintwork had also split, and the tempera used as blood on Christ's face had washed away, with some detail being lost on the figure's hair and arms.

=== Study ===
Delumeau suggests that study of the S. Marcello crucifix allows scholars to trace the development of popular religious sentiment in 16th century Italy. The 1522 procession was a forerunner of the Holy Thursday processions which began in Rome in 1578 and form the basis of similar processions today, for example in Seville. It was also the basis for future Papal processions against plague and heresy, themselves an expression of the general tendency of greater popular piety following the Council of Trent.
