= 2023 in Vatican City =

- Decades: 2000s; 2010s; 2020s
- See also: History of Vatican City; List of years in Vatican City

Events in the year 2023 in Vatican City.

== Incumbents ==
- Pope: Francis
- Cardinal Secretary of State: Pietro Parolin
- President of the Pontifical Commission: Fernando Vérgez Alzaga

== Events ==
- 5 January – The funeral for Pope emeritus Benedict XVI takes place in St. Peter's Square, Vatican City, with at least 100,000 attendees.
- 30 March – The Vatican officially repudiates the discovery doctrine, writing that the 15th-century papal bulls which promoted it were "manipulated for political purposes by competing colonial powers in order to justify immoral acts against indigenous peoples that were carried out, at times, without opposition from ecclesiastical authorities".
- 10 October – Sixteenth Ordinary General Assembly of the Synod of Bishops
- 8 November – The Holy See's Dicastery for the Doctrine of the Faith states that transgender Catholics can be baptized "if it would not cause scandal or confusion", while also acknowledging the possibility of baptizing children of same-sex couples.
- 16 December – A court in the Holy See sentences Cardinal Giovanni Angelo Becciu to five and a half years in prison for embezzlement.
- 18 December – Pope Francis issues Fiducia supplicans, making it possible to bless same-sex couples and others in "irregular situations."

== See also ==
- Roman Catholic Church
- COVID-19 pandemic in Europe
- 2023 in Europe
- City states
