= 2019 in Vatican City =

- Decades: 1990s; 2000s; 2010s; 2020s
- See also: History of Vatican City; List of years in Vatican City

Events in the year 2019 in Vatican City.

== Incumbents ==
- Pope: Francis
- Cardinal Secretary of State: Pietro Parolin
- President of the Pontifical Commission: Giuseppe Bertello

== Events ==
- 4 March – Pope Francis announces the Vatican's historical archives of Pope Pius XII's pontificate (1939–1958) will be accessible to scholars next year, effective 2 March 2020.
- 26 March – The all-female board of Women Church World, a monthly supplement in the L'Osservatore Romano (the Vatican City daily newspaper), resign citing a campaign to discredit them and put them "under the direct control of men".
- 21 April – Pope Francis speaks words of solidarity to the Christian community of Sri Lanka, lamenting that the attacks have wrought grief and sorrow.
- 26 April – Pope Francis meets with Milorad Dodik, head of the joint presidency of Bosnia-Herzegovina. They discuss bilateral relations, the presence of the Catholic community, coexistence and reconciliation, and the economic and social challenges facing Bosnia and Herzegovina.
- 10 June – The Vatican issues a teaching instruction, Male and Female He Created Them, which criticizes the theory of gender as being more complex than the binary division of sexes. The document draws criticism from LGBT groups.
- 28 June – The Vatican asks China's communist government to stop intimidating Catholic clergy who want to remain unequivocally loyal to the pope and refuse to sign ambiguous official registration forms.
- 8 July – Pope Francis names for first time in Vatican history female members of the Congregation for Institutes of Consecrated Life and Societies of Apostolic Life.
- 11 August – Pope Francis recalls the 70th anniversary of the Geneva Conventions after his Sunday afternoon Angelus address. The 1949 conventions concern the treatment of the sick, the wounded, prisoners, and civilians in war.
- 20 August – Holy See–Vietnam relations:
  - The two sides meet in the Vatican and discuss bilateral relations, ecclesial life and the future visit of Vatican secretary of state, Cardinal Pietro Parolin. The Vietnam — Holy See Joint Working Group first met in 2009. Vietnam, a Communist nation of 97 million, is 7% Catholic.
- 17 September – Ecumenical Patriarch Bartholomew meets with Pope Francis at the Vatican. In his brief remarks, Patriarch Bartholomew talks about the value of synodality in the Eastern Orthodox Church.
- 13 October – At Saint Peter's Square, Vatican City, Pope Francis canonizes the 19th-century Anglican convert John Henry Newman, who was a unifying figure in both the Anglican and Catholic churches.
- 28 October – Pope Francis officially renames the Vatican Secret Archive to the Vatican Apostolic Archive.

== Deaths ==
- 29 August: Achille Silvestrini, 95, Italian-born Vatican diplomat and Roman Catholic cardinal, Prefect of the Congregation for the Oriental Churches (1991–2000)

== See also ==
- Roman Catholic Church
- COVID-19 pandemic in Europe
- 2019 in the European Union
- City states
