= EWTN News =

American news agency for Catholic Church news

- Logo used since 2026
- Formerly: Catholic News Agency
- Type: Division
- Industry: News agency
- Founded: 2004; 22 years ago
- Headquarters: Washington, D.C., United States
- Owner: EWTN
- Website: ewtnnews.com

EWTN News, formerly the Catholic News Agency (CNA), is a news service owned by Eternal Word Television Network (EWTN) that provides news related to the Catholic Church to a global Anglophone audience. It was founded in 2004 in Denver, Colorado, United States as the English section of the worldwide ACI Group, which publishes the Spanish-language news service ACI Prensa. It was acquired by EWTN together with ACI Prensa in 2014. It is now based in Washington, D.C.

In 2011, CNA said its editors would provide free news, features, commentary, and photojournalism to editors of newspapers.

On January 15, 2026, EWTN announced that it would merge the Catholic News Agency and ACI Prensa and folded these into the EWTN News division.

== See also ==
- Catholic World News
- National Catholic Register
