= List of Prophet-Presidents of the Community of Christ =

This article lists the Prophet-Presidents of the Community of Christ. The included persons have served as President of the organization. The Community of Christ was formerly (1872–2001) known as the Reorganized Church of Jesus Christ of Latter Day Saints (RLDS).

No.	Portrait	Prophet-President	Birth	Ordination	End of term	Tenure	Death
1		Joseph Smith	December 23, 1805	April 6, 1830	June 27, 1844	14 years, 82 days	June 27, 1844
	Formal reorganization occurred on April 6, 1860 at the Amboy Conference.					15 years, 284 days	
2		Joseph Smith III	November 6, 1832	April 6, 1860	December 10, 1914	54 years, 248 days	December 10, 1914
3		Frederick M. Smith	January 21, 1872	May 15, 1915	March 20, 1946	30 years, 309 days	March 20, 1946
4		Israel A. Smith	February 2, 1876	April 6, 1946	June 14, 1958	12 years, 69 days	June 14, 1958
5		W. Wallace Smith	November 18, 1900	October 6, 1958	April 5, 1978	19 years, 181 days	August 4, 1989
6		Wallace B. Smith	July 29, 1929	April 5, 1978	April 15, 1996	18 years, 10 days	September 22, 2023
7		W. Grant McMurray	June 12, 1947	April 15, 1996	November 29, 2004	8 years, 228 days	Living
8		Stephen M. Veazey	May 3, 1957	June 3, 2005	June 1, 2025	19 years, 363 days	Living
9		Stassi D. Cramm	June 3, 1962	June 1, 2025	Incumbent	1 year, 7 days	Living
