= Markus Hofmann =

- Occupation: Professional Memory Trainer
- Employer: MEMO-MIND
- Known for: Memory training, Keynote Speaker, Author, Lecturer
- Board member of: Global Speakers Federation, German Speakers Association, Steinbeis-Transfer-Institut “Professional Speaker GSA”
- Website: http://www.unvergesslich.de

Markus Hofmann (born 5 April 1975 in Nabburg) is a professional memory trainer, a Keynote Speaker having received a manifold of achievement awards, associate lecturer and author concerning the topics Memory Training and the Brain. He is actively engaged as a lecturer at the Steinbeis Hochschule Berlin as well as the Management Universität St.Gallen. He holds lectures on Brain and Memory Training at the ZfU International Business School in Switzerland. He is, among others, a member of the Global Speakers Federation (GSF) as well as a member of the Board of the German Speakers Association (GSA). Hofmann also is a director of the STI – Steinbeis-Transfer-Institut “Professional Speaker GSA”. In 2009 he wrote the bestseller “Brain in Top Form” focused on the topic Memory Training. Since 2010 he has been one of the Top-100 Speakers in Germany.

== Memory trainer ==
After the completion of a trainee-ship as a bank clerk, Markus Hofmann started his professional career as a speaker for Public Relations at a Sparkasse (savings bank) in the county of Schwandorf, following that he worked at Sparkassenverband Bayern in the field of advertising and communication. Later on he studied at Bayerische Akademie für Werbung und Marketing and qualified as a marketing expert (BAW). He became a memory trainer after finalizing his studies in 2002. He expanded his scope of activities by training as a MAT Trainer (Mental Activation Training) at the Gesellschaft für Gehirntraining as well as by his studies as a European Business Trainer at the Köppel Akademie. Markus Hofmann currently has a close cooperation with Mega-Memory and he is a partner of Gregor Staub.

Markus Hofmann calls his own method MEMO-MIND. The basis of the special Hofmann style of training is the ancient Greek Mnemotechnique. Consequently, the well-known Loci-Method as well as the Figure-Symbol-Technique are among the techniques he applies. These are based on pictures, imagination and creativity. Hofmann combines antique techniques with modern findings referring to the brain and the memory. His uniqueness rests upon the particular way the techniques and the knowledge as such are being communicated by him. Positive motivation as well as positive feedback during learning processes are crucial for him – so are special learning cycles to transport the just learned from the short-term memory to the long-term memory. Markus Hofmann calls the special memory training communicated by him infotainment. According to him, learning has got to be fun because an interactively and positively focused knowledge transfer, enhanced by experiences, supports the memorizing processes. As a consequence Markus Hofmann is of the opinion that the particular way knowledge and techniques are communicated are path breaking for the success of the learning processes of special as well as general knowledge. This, he is convinced, applies to adults as well as to children.

Furthermore, Markus Hofmann is an advocator of brain jogging by means of which the different parts of the brain are trained and which are allocated to numerous tasks (among others the ability of creating word formations, logical thinking, visual and mathematical imagination and concentration). He continuously works out his own brain jogging exercises. An additional purpose of this training is the increase of memory potential.

As a memory trainer Markus Hofmann became well known by his training activities for the “Schottenwette” ("Scots Bet") of a German TV show called “Wetten, dass..?” ("I’ll bet you").

== Keynote speaker ==
Markus Hofmann is not only a memory trainer, he is also an internationally operating Keynote Speaker. He got a lot of publicity in Germany by numerous expert forums such as e.g. “Die Erfolgsmacher” ("The Makers of Success") of the News Magazine FOCUS, which rates him among the “10 Success Makers” in Germany. In the year 2006 he was awarded with the Excellence Award for Trainers and Lecturers. Added to that he works as an assistant lecturer at schools and renowned universities such as the Steinbeis Hochschule Berlin as well as the Management Universität St. Gallen. He holds lectures about that subject at the ZfU, International Business School in Switzerland. He has been a director at the STI Steinbeis Transfer Institut “Professional Speaker GSA” since 2010. In July 2010 he was the first European to receive the CPS (Certified Speaking Professional) certification in Orlando.

== Bibliography ==
- WARUM? 22 Fragen an TOP-Referenten („Why? 22 Questions to TOP Speakers“) (GABAL Verlag, 2010) ISBN 978-3-86936-056-0
- Hirn in Hochform – So funktioniert Ihr Gehirn (“Brain in top form - That’s the way your brain works”) (Verlag Carl Ueberreuter/Vienna, 2009) ISBN 978-3-8000-7391-7
- Das merk ich mir! („I’ll remember that!“) (Audiobook, inTune Verlag, 2007) ISBN 978-3-939675-01-3
- FOCUS Forum: Die Erfolgsmacher II („The Success Makers II“) (Campus Verlag, 2005) ISBN 978-3-593-37769-8
- Familie in Hochform (“Families in top form“) (Verlag Carl Ueberreuter/Vienna, 2010) ISBN 978-3-8000-7479-2
