= Carolina Santocanale =

Italian nun, foundress, saint

Saint Carolina Santocanale O.F.S.
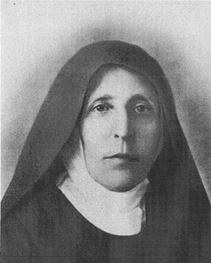

Religious
- Born: 2 October 1852; Palermo, Italy
- Died: 27 January 1923 (aged 70); Cinisi, Palermo
- Venerated in: Roman Catholic Church
- Beatified: 12 June 2016, Monreale, Italy by Cardinal Angelo Amato
- Canonized: 15 May 2022, Saint Peter's Square, Vatican City by Pope Francis
- Feast: 27 January
- Attributes: Religious habit
- Patronage: Capuchin Sisters of the Immaculata of Lourdes

Carolina Santocanale (2 October 1852 - 27 January 1923) was an Italian Roman Catholic nun who assumed the name of "Maria of Jesus" and established the Capuchin Sisters of the Immaculata of Lourdes. Santocanale became well known for her treatment of the ill and the poor to whom she devoted her life and work to and was also a member of the Secular Franciscan Order.

The recognition of her life of heroic virtue in 2000 allowed for Pope John Paul II to declare Santocanale to be Venerable while a miracle attributed to her intercession allowed for her beatification in Monreale on 12 June 2016; Cardinal Angelo Amato presided on the behalf of Pope Francis. She was canonized on 15 May 2022 in Rome.

== Life ==
Carolina Concetta Angela Santocanale was born on 2 October 1852 in Palermo to nobles from the house of Celsa Raele; her father, Giuseppe, was a lawyer, and her mother was donna Caterina Andriolo Stagno. She was baptized on 3 October and received her First Communion at the age of eight.

She attended her primary studies at a school managed by two nuns, helped by other teachers of literature, music and French. In 1861, during the Lent period, Carolina left that school and continued her education at home, guided by private tutors, but she did not get any tiles of study.

At the age of nineteen she was called to the bedside of her ailing grandfather who died a short while following their encounter. As a result of the encounter she met Mauro Venuti who soon became Santocanale's spiritual director. She soon became the target of marriage offers but she felt a strong call to religious life in which she was torn between the contemplative cloister and working with the poor and the sick. It was at the age of 21 that she agreed to become the President of the Daughters of Mary in the parish of San Antonio in Palermo.

Santocanale contracted a disease during this period and endured sixteen months of severe pain but managed to stave off the disease in 1887. Due to being torn between the contemplative and the active religious life she hoped to combine the two together and decided to join the Secular Franciscan Order - the promotion of the order in 1887 from Pope Leo XIII inspired her to turn towards the order. On 13 June 1887 she received the Franciscan habit as a professed member of the Secular Franciscan Order; she assumed the new name of "Maria di Gesù".

She travelled across Palermo from door to door giving alms to the poor and to the sick to whom she devoted her life and work to; she became recognized for her backpack of supplies. She decided also to establish a branch of the Franciscans in order to do this and thus established the Capuchin Sisters of the Immaculata of Lourdes on 8 December 1909. The congregation was approved on 24 January 1923 as an Institute of Consecrated Life of Diocesan Right on a diocesan level from the Archbishop of Palermo Alessandro Lualdi.

Santocanale died in the week following the approval of her order in 1923. Her funeral was celebrated on the following 29 January and her remains were later moved to the church of her institute on 24 October 1926. Pope Pius XII recognized her congregation in 1947 as an Institute of Pontifical Right and Pope Paul VI issued a decree of praise for the order in 1968.

== Canonization ==
The beatification process commenced on 2 April 1982 under Pope John Paul II with the declaration of the title Servant of God being conferred upon her and the commencement of a diocesan process. Upon the completion of the tribunal's work the Congregation for the Causes of Saints validated the process on 19 September 1991. The postulation compiled the Positio on Santocanale's life and works and submitted it to Rome in 1992 for further inspection.

John Paul II approved her life of heroic virtue and on 1 July 2000 proclaimed her to be Venerable.

The miracle required for her beatification was investigated and was validated in 2005; Pope Francis approved the findings in regards to the miracle on 14 December 2015 which allowed for the beatification of Santocanale to take place; it was celebrated in Monreale on 12 June 2016 and Cardinal Angelo Amato presided on the pope's behalf.

Pope Francis canonized Santocanale on 15 May 2022.

The postulator assigned to the cause is Carlo Calloni.
