= Ludovico of Casoria =

Christian saint

Saint Ludovico of Casoria O.F.M.
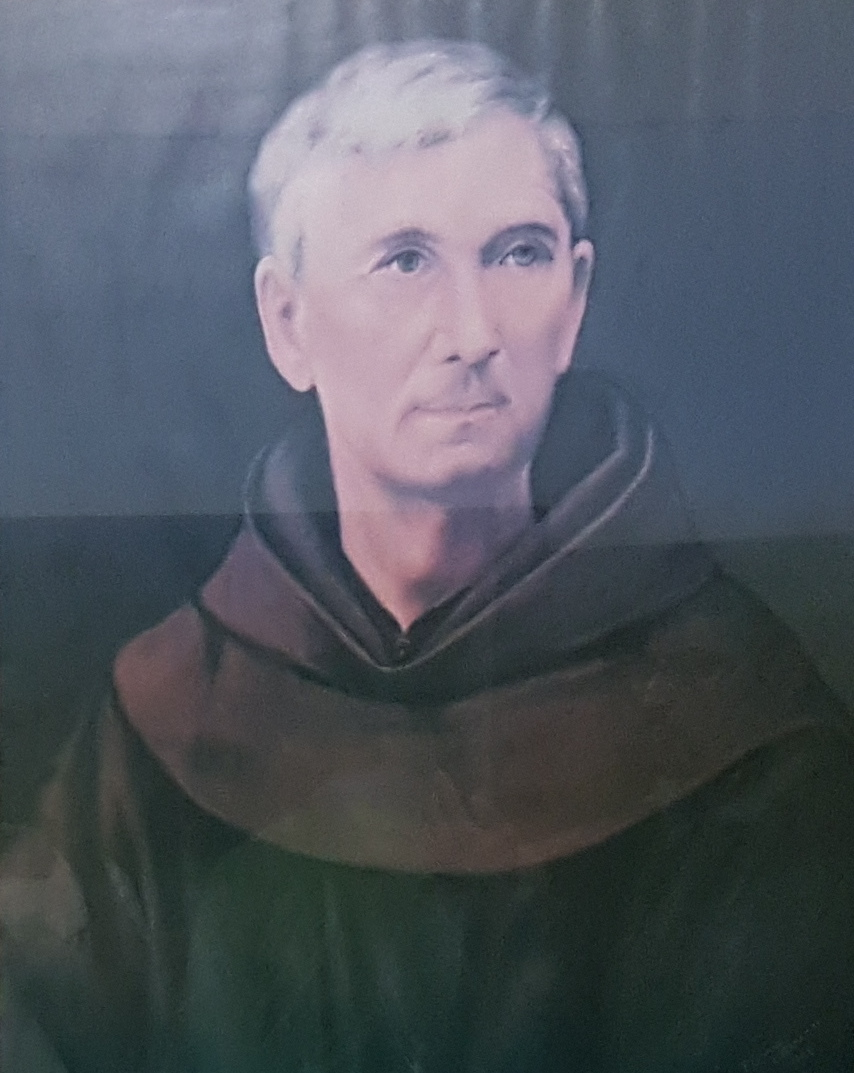
- Born: 11 March 1814; Naples, Kingdom of Naples
- Died: 30 March 1885 (aged 71); Naples, Kingdom of Italy
- Venerated in: Roman Catholic Church
- Beatified: 18 April 1993, Saint Peter's Square, Vatican City by Pope John Paul II
- Canonized: 23 November 2014, Saint Peter's Square, Vatican City by Pope Francis
- Feast: 30 March
- Attributes: Franciscan habit
- Patronage: Casoria; Grey Friars of Charity; Sisters of Saint Elizabeth

Ludovico da Casoria (Italian pronunciation: [ludoˈviːko da kaˈzɔːrja]; 11 March 1814 – 30 March 1885) - born Arcangelo Palmentieri - was an Italian Roman Catholic priest and a professed member of the Order of Friars Minor. He was a renowned social reformer who founded both the Grey Friars of Charity and the Grey Sisters of Saint Elizabeth.

Pope Francis canonized him as a saint of the Roman Catholic Church on 23 November 2014; he remains a patron of Casoria and of his religious orders.

== Life ==
=== Early life ===
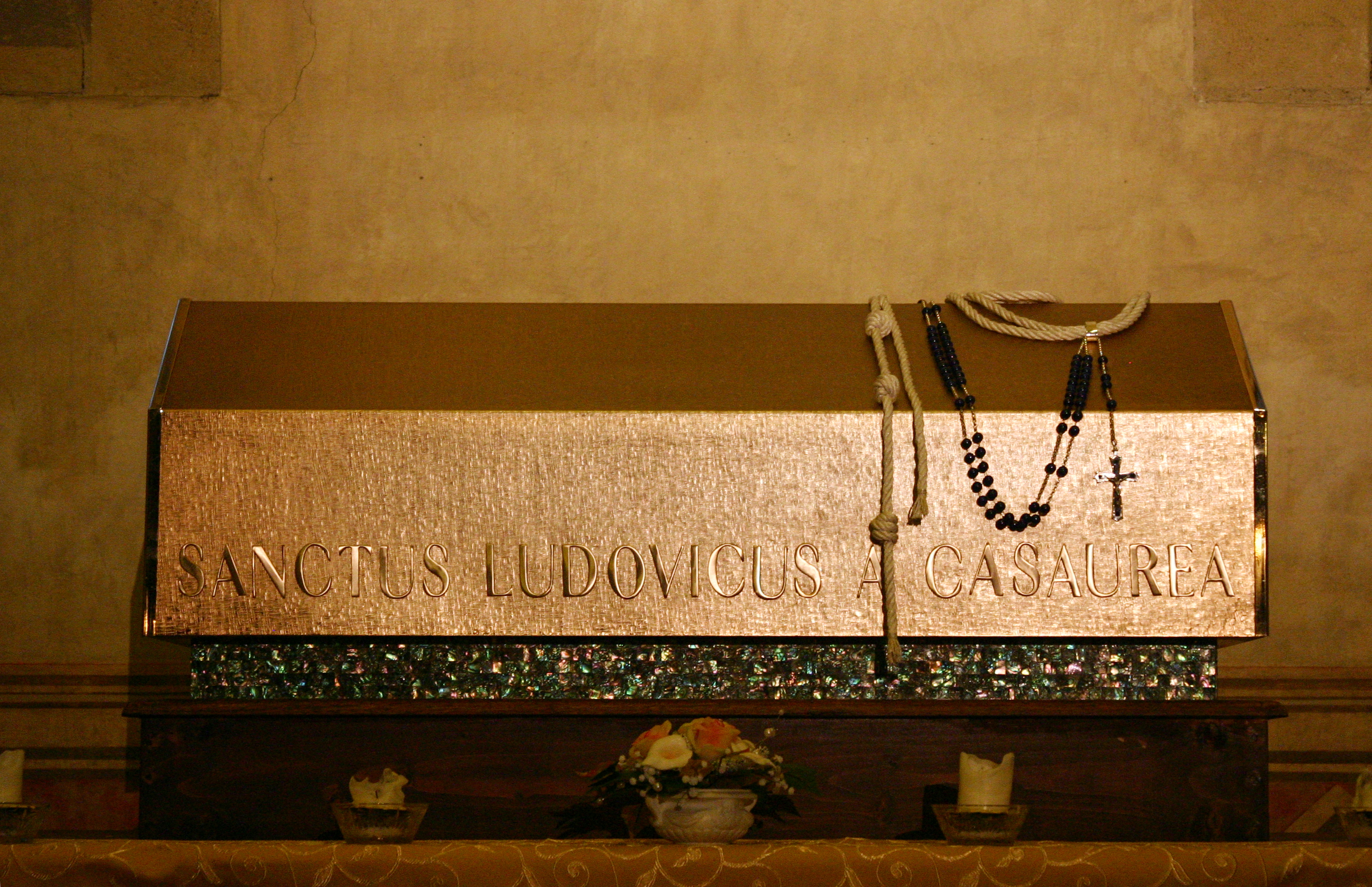
Tomb at Santa Chiara in Naples.

Arcangelo Palmentieri, was born in Casoria, near Naples, on 11 March 1814. He apprenticed as a cabinet maker in his youth. He entered the novitiate of the Order of Friars Minor on 1 July 1832, taking the name Ludovico. Ludovico was ordained five years later and was appointed to teach philosophy, mathematics, and chemistry to the younger members of the Order at the Franciscan priory of Saint Peter (San Pietro) in Naples.

Ludovico reported having a mystical experience in 1847, after which he embarked on a lifetime of establishing works to care for the poor and needy of the time, founding dispensaries and orphanages. About 1852 he opened a school for the education of African boys and girls redeemed from slavery. He also founded institutions for the deaf and the mute. He also worked to provide care for the elderly members of his own Order. In addition to an infirmary for friars of his province, he began charitable institutes in Naples, Florence and Assisi.

=== Founder ===
Following the advice of his superiors to find others to whom he could entrust this work, in 1859 he instituted a community of men as a religious congregation of the Franciscan Third Order Regular at San Pietro. The group was composed of men who had belonged to the Secular Franciscans. They became known as the Gray Friars of Charity (Italian: Frati Bigi della Carità) on account of the traditional grayish color of the Franciscan religious habit. Three years later, he instituted likewise a congregation of religious women, known as the Franciscan Sisters of Saint Elizabeth (Suore Elisabettiane Bigie), whom he placed under the protection of Elizabeth of Hungary, one of the first members of the Third Order of Saint Francis and its patron saint.

The work of the friars spread to the United States, where they served the Italian American community in New Jersey; the Holy See formally approved the friars in 1877. Due to the small number of members still in the congregation, the Holy See disbanded the friars in 1971. A new group of men and women, dedicated to his vision, however, currently exists in the process of forming.

The Franciscan Sisters of Saint Elizabeth currently serve in Italy, the United States of America, Ethiopia, India, Panama and the Philippines.

=== Death and veneration ===
A serious and painful illness attacked Ludovico around 1876; he never completely recovered and died nine years later.

Within months after the death of Ludovico, the cause for his canonization was introduced in Rome. Pope John Paul II beatified him on 18 April 1993 and Pope Francis canonized him on 23 November 2014. His feast day is celebrated on 30 March.

His spiritual testament begins: "The Lord called me to himself with a most tender love, and with an infinite charity he led and directed me along the path of my life." (Saint of the Day)

The reconstructed body of San Ludovico da Casoria is visible in the Basilica of Santa Chiara. The new transparent urn replaces the small reliquary that contained the bones of the friar since 2015. On 1 November, after the mass celebrated by the provincial father of the Friars Minor, Carlo D'Amodio, the urn showing the body in its natural was discovered anatomical conformity, covered by the Franciscan habit. The skeleton, preserved in its entirety, was reconstituted by medical experts Professor Michele Papa, Professor of Normal Human Anatomy at the Luigi Vanvitelli University of Naples, Professor Rosaria Maria Anna Costanzo, Pathological Anatomy Researcher and Doctor Domenico Ronga, emeritus Primary Pascale Institute of Naples. The body is visible in the plastic image of the moment of death, which occurred at 7.15 am on 30 March 1885 in the Marino hospice of Posillipo.

== Sources ==
- Acta Ordinis Minorum (May, 1907), 156–158;
- The Catholic World (November, 1895), 155–166;
- Voce di Sant' Antonio (July, 1907), 23–26.
