= Francesca Di Giovanni =

Italian lawyer and Catholic official

Undersecretary for Multilateral Affairs of the Roman Curia's Section for Relations with States
- In role 15 January 2020 – 10 January 2023
- Monarch: Francis
- Succeeded by: Daniel Pacho

Personal details
- Born: 24 March 1953 (age 73) Palermo, Sicily, Italy
- Occupation: Lawyer

Francesca Di Giovanni (born 24 March 1953) is an Italian lawyer who has worked in the Secretariat of State of the Holy See since 1993. In January 2020 she was appointed by Pope Francis to serve as the Undersecretary for Multilateral Affairs in the Section for Relations with States, becoming the first woman to hold a managerial position in that branch of the Roman Curia.

== Biography ==
Di Giovanni was born on 24 March 1953 in Palermo. She studied law and completed her training as a notary. She then worked in the administration of the international center of the Focolare Movement. On 15 September 1993, she joined the Secretariat of State of the Holy See, where she worked in the field of multilateral relations. Her responsibilities included refugee and migration issues as well as international human rights, communications, private law, the position of women, copyright issues, and tourism.

On 15 January 2020, Pope Francis appointed her an Undersecretary for Multilateral Affairs in the Section for Relations with States of the Secretariat of State. She is the first woman and the first lay person to hold a managerial position in the Secretariat of State, a position normally reserved for a member of the clergy. Her responsibilities include the Holy See's interests in intergovernmental organizations and international treaties, while the bilateral sector is headed by another undersecretary, Mirosław Wachowski, a Polish cleric. (Note: Both multilateral and bilateral relations were previously the responsibility of a single undersecretary, most recently Antoine Camilleri until his appointment as an Apostolic Nuncio on 31 October 2019.)

In 2023 she retired from service to the Holy See on her seventieth birthday. She described her appointment thus "It was a novelty that surprised me greatly: it had never happened that a lay person, let alone a woman, was called by the Pope to this service."
