= Ganden Phodrang (disambiguation) =

Ganden Phodrang was the Tibetan government established by the 5th Dalai Lama, which lasted until the 2011, when the 14th Dalai Lama devolved power to a democratically elected Lobsang Sangay Prime Minister, also known as Sikyong.

Ganden Phodrang may also refer to:

- The institution of Dalai Lama that holds the rights for his next reincarnation
- The estate of the Dalai Lamas at Drepung Monastery of the same name.
- The labrang, or the institution of the Dalai Lamas.
- The Tibetan Government in Exile, see Central Tibetan Administration.
