= Fabrizio Soccorsi =

Italian physician (1942–2021)

Fabrizio Soccorsi (2 February 1942 – 9 January 2021) was an Italian physician. He was personal physician to Pope Francis from 2015 until his death.

== Biography ==
Soccorsi graduated in medicine and surgery from La Sapienza University in 1968 and, after obtaining his license to practice the following year, he carried out a wide range of activities, both at the medical and teaching levels, until he was appointed head of the department of Hepatology and director of the Department of Liver Diseases, Digestive System and Nutrition and of the Department of Internal and Specialized Medicine of the San Camillo Forlanini Hospital in Rome.

He taught immunology at the School of Medicine of the Hospitals of Rome and the Lazio Region, took refresher courses on liver pathologies at the San Camilo Hospital and was appointed to the chair of Clinical Medicine and Pharmacology at the Faculty of Medicine and Surgery of the University of Rome La Sapienza. He also developed several collaborations and consultancies in the public sector, with more than a hundred publications and scientific contributions. He was also a consultant for the Directorate of Health and Hygiene of the Government of the Vatican City State and an expert on the Medical Consultation of the Congregation for the Causes of Saints.

In June 2017, he was deeply affected by the death of his daughter Cristiana, who died prematurely after a long illness. And, delicately, Pope Francis, in the sanctuary of Our Lady of Fátima where he had gone a few days before, had wanted him by his side when he placed two bouquets of white roses before the image of Mary.

In late 2020, Soccorsi was admitted to the Agostino Gemelli Hospital in Rome, infected with COVID-19 and due to the existence of oncological complications that previously afflicted him. He died from pneumonia caused by COVID-19 on 9 January 2021, at age 78, during the COVID-19 pandemic in Italy.
