= 2024 in Vatican City =

- Decades: 2000s; 2010s; 2020s
- See also: History of Vatican City; List of years in Vatican City

Events in the year 2024 in Vatican City.

== Incumbents ==
- Pope: Francis
- Cardinal Secretary of State: Pietro Parolin
- President of the Pontifical Commission: Fernando Vérgez Alzaga

== Events ==
- 17 May: Cardinal Víctor Manuel Fernández revealed the "Norms for Proceeding in the Discernment of Alleged Supernatural Phenomena", overhauling the 1978 norms.
- 5 July: Catholic Archbishop Carlo Maria Viganò is found guilty of schism for denying the legitimacy of Pope Francis and rejecting the Second Vatican Council, and is subsequently excommunicated by the Dicastery for the Doctrine of the Faith.
- 14 August: After more than a year of high-level investigation, the Vatican expels Luis Fernando Figari, the leader of the Peruvian society of apostolic life Sodalitium Christianae Vitae, for financial corruption and for downplaying allegations of sexual and psychological abuse.
- 24 December: The 2025 Jubilee began.

== Holidays ==
- 1 January - Solemnity of Mary, Mother of God
- 6 January - Epiphany
- 11 February - Lateran Treaty
- 13 March - Anniversary of the election of Pope Francis
- 19 March – Saint Joseph's Day
- 1 April - Easter Monday
- 23 April – Saint George's Day
- 1 May - Saint Joseph the Worker
- 29 June – Saints Peter and Paul
- 15 August – Assumption Day
- 8 September - Nativity of Mary
- 1 November - All Saints' Day
- 8 December – Immaculate Conception
- 25 December - Christmas Day
- 26 December – Saint Stephen's Day

== See also ==
- Roman Catholic Church
- 2024 in Europe
- City states
