= Camillo Serafini =

Italian noble

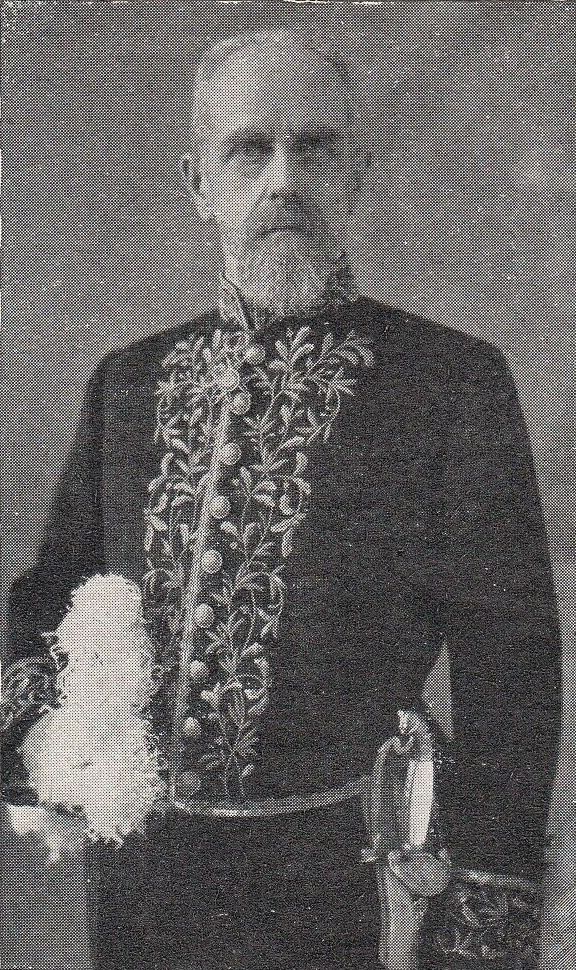
Governor Camillo Serafini, 1930

Camillo Serafini (April 21, 1864 – March 21, 1952) was an Italian Marquis and the first and only Governor of Vatican City, from 11 February 1929 to 21 March 1952. He was also notable as a numismatist.

In 1898, Serafini was appointed as curator of the numismatic collections of the Vatican Library. He published a catalogue of the Vatican collections between 1910 and 1928. He was also president of the Circolo San Pietro, a support organization for the Prefecture of the Papal Household.

Pope Pius XI appointed Serafini as Governor of Vatican City in 1929, on the foundation of the State, and he remained in office until his death in 1952. Pius XI built the Governor's Palace in the Vatican Gardens to house the Governor's administration.

In 1929, it fell to Serafini to welcome the king and queen of Italy when they visited the Vatican.

In December 1934, Pius XI ordered Serafini to reorganize the civil administration of the Vatican City and gave him absolute legislative powers for six months, reported by The New York Times under the headline "Dictator named for Vatican City".

As governor, Serafini signed the convention of 6 September 1932 between the Holy See and the Kingdom of Italy. In 1943, he signed with the German-controlled Italian Social Republic the guarantee of extraterritoriality for religious buildings not included in the Lateran Treaty.

On 20 December 1939, the king and queen of Italy made a further state visit to the Vatican, and Serafini read an address to welcome them.

In 1950, Charles H. Doyle described Serafini as "a colorful layman" who was a frequent visitor to Pope Pius XII.

Serafini died in Rome of angina pectoris on March 21, 1952, aged 88.

The office of Governor of Vatican City was brought to an end by Pope Pius XII on the death of Serafini, and its functions were transferred to the Pontifical Commission for Vatican City State.

The marquis was a cousin of Cardinal Domenico Serafini, who served as Prefect of the Sacred Congregation for the Propagation of the Faith between 1916 and 1918.

== Publications ==
- Camillo Serafini, Catalogo delle monete e bolle plumbee pontificie del Medagliere Vaticano,
- Camillo Serafini, "Le monete e le bolle plumbee pontificie del Medagliere Vaticano", 4 voll., Milano, 1908–1927.
- Camillo Serafini, Della collezione di Celati di monete pontificie acquistata per il Medagliere Vaticano dal Pontefice Benedetto XV.
- Camillo Serafini, L’arte nei ritratti della moneta romana repubblicana; [Camillo Serafini]. - Roma, 1897. - p. 3-34, 1 tav.; 27 cm. - Estr. da: Bullettino della commissione archeologica comunale di Roma, 25 (1897), fasc.1
- Camillo Serafini, Saggio intorno alle monete e medaglioni antichi ritrovati nelle catacombe di Panfilo sulla via Salaria Vetus in Roma, in Scritti in onore di Bartolomeo Nogara raccolti in occasione del suo LXX anno, Roma, Tipografia del Senato, 1937, pp. 421–443.
