= Governor of Vatican City =

Vatican government office (1929–1952)

Governor of the Vatican City State
- Governatore dello Stato della Città del Vaticano (Italian)
- Flag of Vatican City

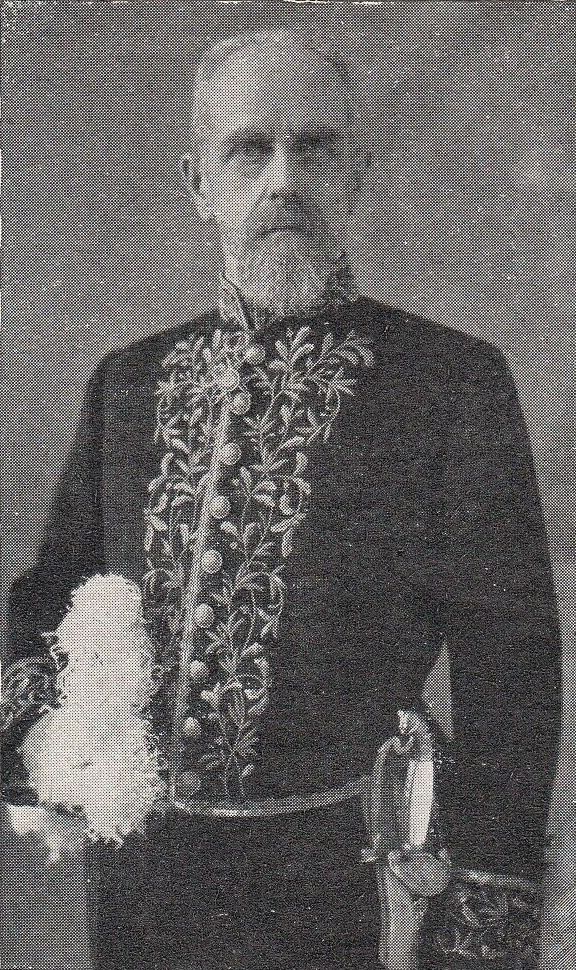
- Governor Camillo Serafini, 1930
- Residence: Governor's Palace
- Appointer: Pope
- Formation: 11 February 1929
- First holder: Camillo Serafini
- Final holder: Camillo Serafini
- Abolished: 21 March 1952
- Superseded by: Pontifical Commission for Vatican City State

The post of Governor of the Vatican City State (Italian: Governatore dello Stato della Città del Vaticano) was held by Marchese Camillo Serafini from the foundation of the state in 1929 until his death in 1952. The governor had power to appoint and supervise the people running the city state. During Serafini's lifetime, the powers of the governor were limited by Pope Pius XII in 1939 by the establishment of the Pontifical Commission for Vatican City State. No successor was appointed and the position was abolished on Serafini's death.

The Pontifical Commission for Vatican City State has exercised the functions that were previously attributed to the governor since 1952. The President of the commission has also held the title of President of the Governorate of the Vatican City State since 2001, which has the responsibilities of the governor of the state.

== History ==
After the rise of Fascist Italy, there was a drive to introduce a governo (governor) to take responsibility for running the remaining Papal estate, which, following the unification of Italy, was limited to the Leonine City in Rome. The term governo was used as the person was the "govern" the city, but their responsibility was similar to a mayor. The first person to be appointed to the role was Marchese Camillo Serafini, who took office at the creation of the Vatican City on 11 February 1929. On 20 March 1939, Pope Pius XII created the Pontifical Commission for Vatican City State, which had representation from the laity as well as cardinals. The role of the commission was to present the pope's positions and ensure governance of the state aligned with papal policy. Pius XII placed the commission over the governor and so limited the powers of the office. Over time, many of the governor's responsibilities were passed to a Special Delegate that was appointed by the Pontifical Commission for Vatican City State on the advice of the pope. Serafini remained in post as governor until his death on 21 March 1952.

Serafini was not replaced and the role was taken over by the Pontifical Commission for Vatican City State which consisted of two cardinals and two members of the laity, fulfilling one of Pope Pius XII's dreams that the Vatican City would be ruled by collegiate governance. However, this produced a political problem with executive power uncertain, which subsequent popes attempted to address throughout the remainder of the century. In July 1969, the roles of Special Delegate, president of the Council of State and president of the Pontifical Commission for Vatican City State were combined. This was further reformed by Pope John Paul II in the Fundamental Law of Vatican City State of 26 November 2000 with the introduction of the title of President of the Governorate of the Vatican City State, which is held by the President of the Pontifical Commission for Vatican City State. The new role has the responsibilities of the Italian: Governatore dello Stato (Governor of the State). This Law came into effect on 22 February 2001.

== Role ==
The governor's role was defined by the Lateran Treaty, signed on 11 February 1929. This conferred on the governor the right to uphold the laws of the newly founded Vatican City, particularly those to do with citizenship. The governor was to be a member of the laity, rather than an ordained member of the Catholic clergy, and a citizen and resident in the Vatican City Appointed by the pope, the individual had the power to appoint and supervise the people running the city state. To support the role, the pope could appoint a General Counsellor of State, another member of the laity, that could advise both the pope and the governor. The governor could also be assisted by a vice-governor.

The governor lived in a house, the Governor's Palace, commissioned by Pope Pius XI that was painted white and constructed of brick and stone.

== See also ==
- Index of Vatican City-related articles
