= Cardinals created by Pius IX =

Catholic appointments from 1846 to 1877

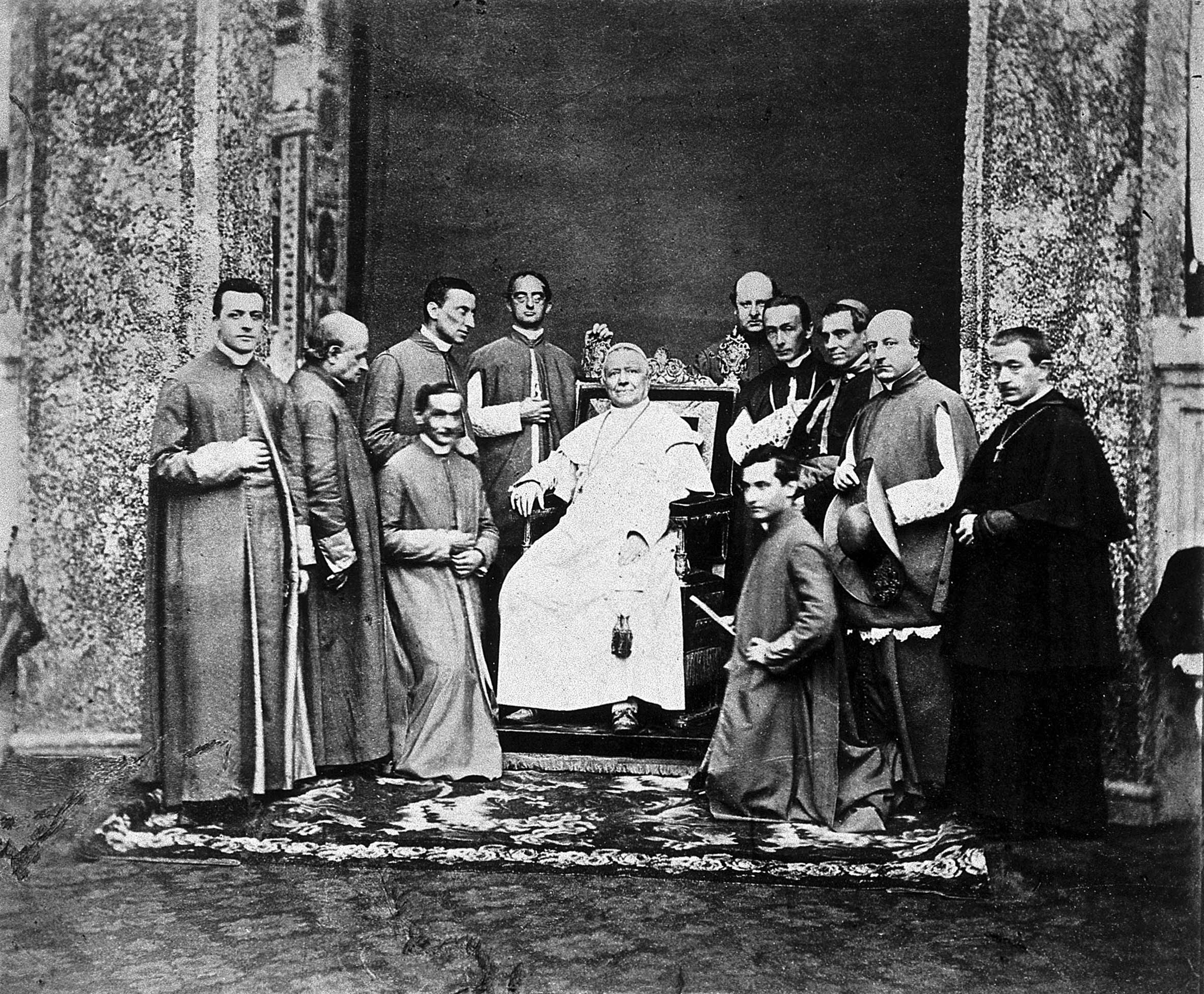
Pope Pius IX (1792-1878), surrounded by clerical members of the Papal Court.

Pope Pius IX (r. 1846–1878) created 123 cardinals in 23 consistories.

== 21 December 1846 ==
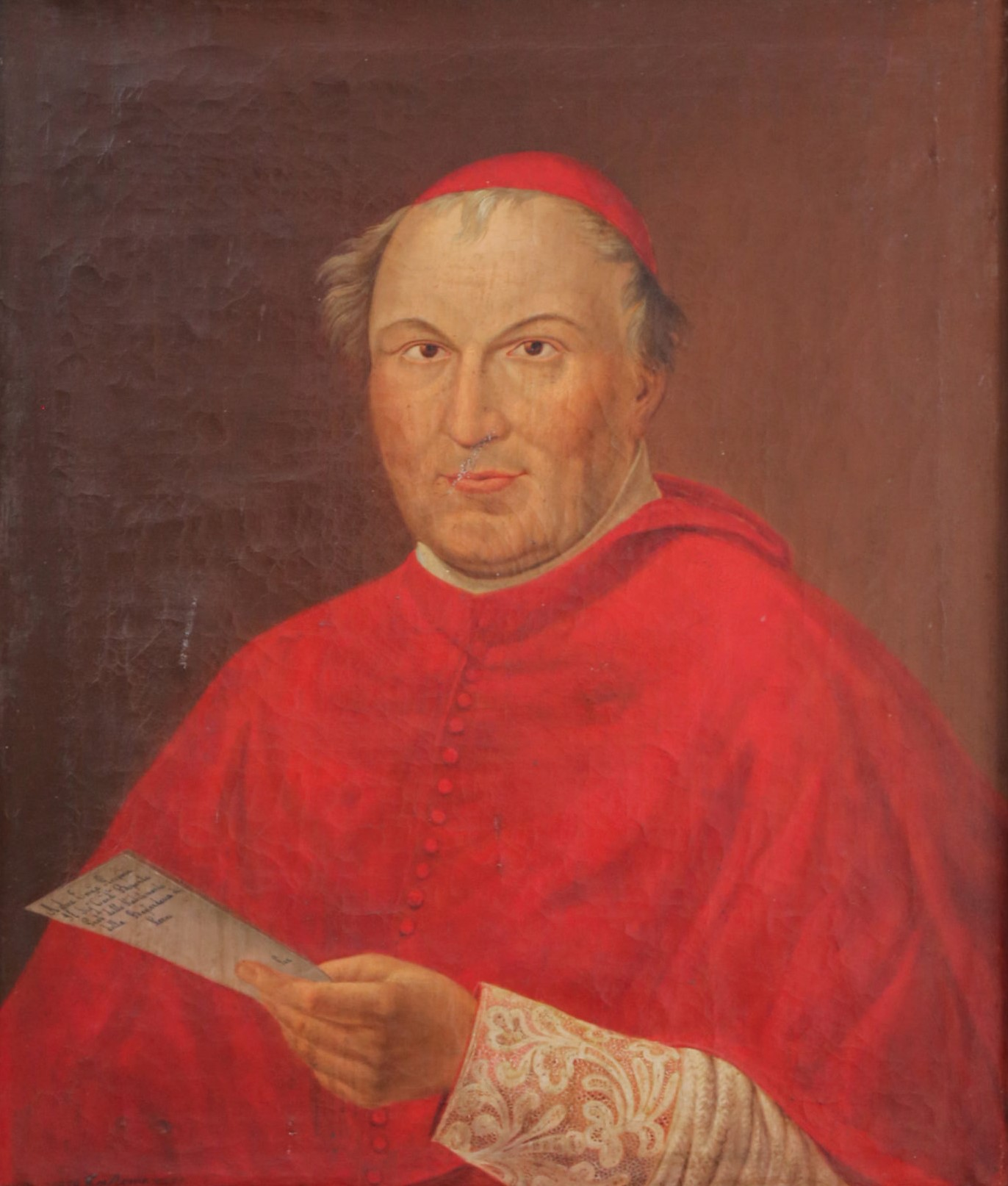
Giuseppe Bofondi (1795–1867), made a cardinal in pectore on 21 December 1846, and published on 11 June 1847.

Pius created four cardinals at his first consistory, two of them in pectore.

Name	Title when named cardinal	Country
Gaetano Baluffi (1788–1866)	Archbishop-bishop of Imola	Papal States
Pietro Marini (1794–1863)	Vice-Camerlengo of the Holy Roman Church	Papal States

=== Cardinals in pectore ===
Name	Title when named cardinal	Country	Revealed as Cardinal
Raffaele Fornari (1787–1854)	Apostolic Nuncio to France	Papal States	30 September 1850
Giuseppe Bofondi (1795–1867)	Dean of the Sacred Roman Rota	Papal States	11 June 1847

== 11 June 1847 ==
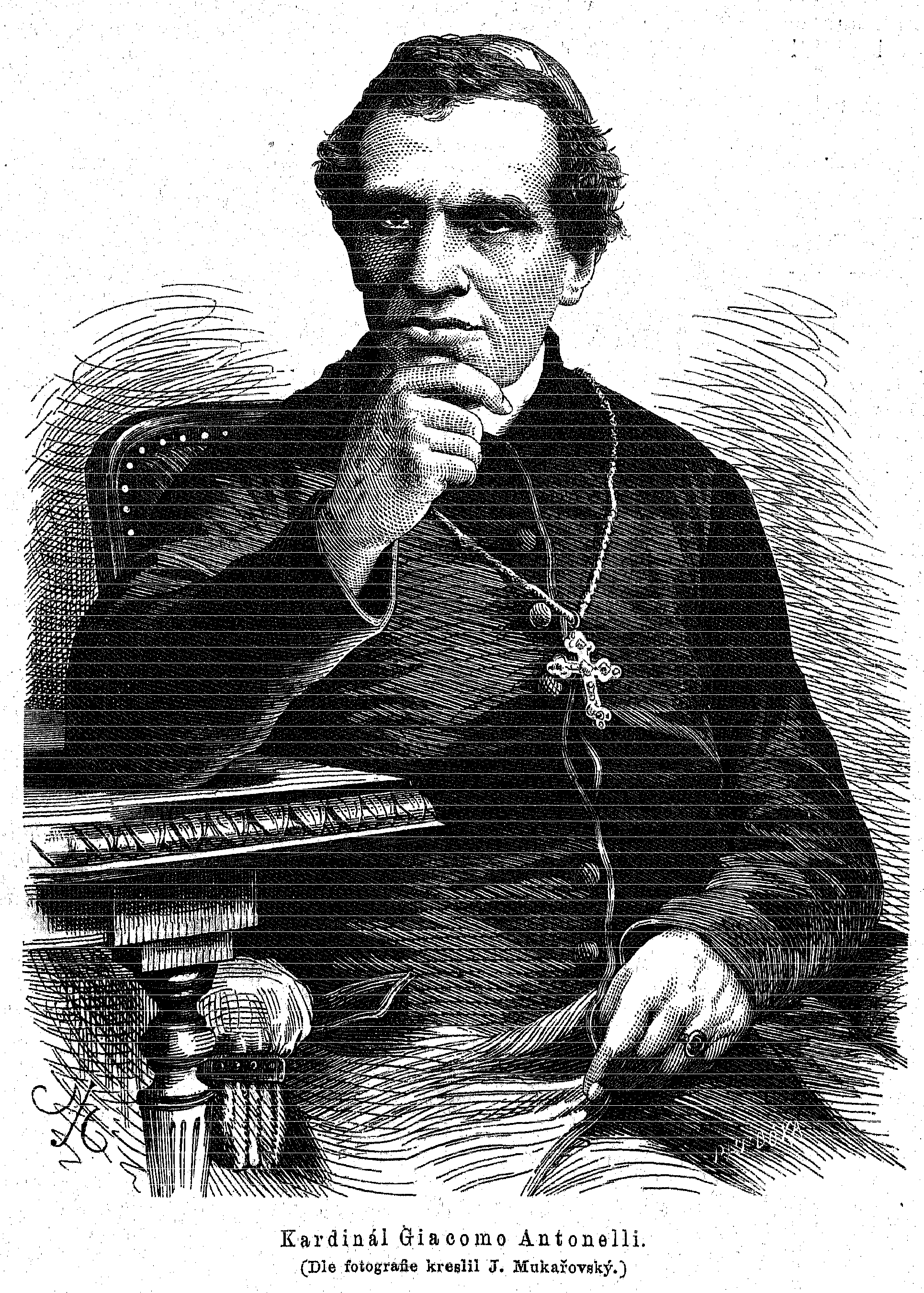
Giacomo Antonelli (1806-76), made a cardinal on 11 June 1847.

Name	Title when named cardinal	Country
Pierre Giraud (1791–1850)	Archbishop of Cambrai	France
Jacques-Marie Antoine Célestin Dupont (1792–1859)	Archbishop of Bourges	France
Giacomo Antonelli (1806–1876)	Treasurer General of the Reverend Apostolic Camera	Papal States

== 17 January 1848 ==
Name	Title when named cardinal	Country
Carlo Vizzardelli (1791–1851)	Secretary of the Sacred Congregation for Extraordinary Ecclesiastical Affairs	Papal States

== 30 September 1850 ==
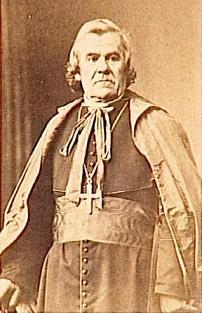
Thomas-Marie-Joseph Gousset (1792-1866), made a cardinal on 30 September 1850.

Name	Title when named cardinal	Country
Paul-Thérèse-David d'Astros (1772–1851)	Archbishop of Toulouse	France
Juan José Bonel y Orbe (1782–1857)	Archbishop of Toledo	Spain
Giuseppe Cosenza (1788–1863)	Bishop of Andria	Two Sicilies
Jacques-Marie-Adrien-Césaire Mathieu (1796–1875)	Archbishop of Besançon	France
Judas José Romo y Gamboa (1779–1855)	Archbishop of Sevilla	Spain
Thomas-Marie-Joseph Gousset (1792–1866)	Archbishop of Reims	France
Maximilian Joseph Gottfried Sommerau Beeckh (1769–1853)	Archbishop of Olomouc	Austria
Johannes von Geissel (1796–1864)	Archbishop of Cologne	Prussia
Pedro Paulo de Figueiredo da Cunha e Melo (1770–1855)	Archbishop of Braga	Portugal
Nicholas Wiseman (1802–1865)	Vicar Apostolic of London District	United Kingdom
Giuseppe Pecci (Note: Not to be confused with Giuseppe Pecci, who would be made cardinal on 1879. Neither related to him, nor Gioacchino Pecci, who would be made a cardinal on 1853.) (1776–1855)	Bishop of Gubbio	Papal States
Melchior von Diepenbrock (1798–1853)	Bishop of Breslau	Prussia
Roberto Giovanni F. Roberti (1788–1867)	Auditor General of the Reverend Apostolic Camera	Papal States

== 15 March 1852 ==
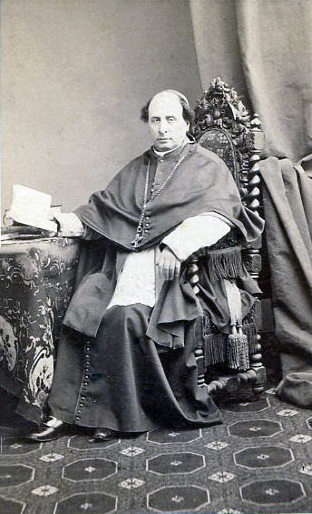
Gerolamo Marquese d'Andrea (1812-68), made a cardinal on 15 March 1852.

Name	Title when named cardinal	Country
Domenico Lucciardi (1796–1864)	Archbishop-bishop of Senigallia	Papal States
Ferdinand-François-Auguste Donnet (1795–1882)	Archbishop of Bordeaux	France
Gerolamo Marquese d'Andrea (1812–1868)	Secretary of the Sacred Congregation of the Council	Two Sicilies
Carlo Luigi Morichini (1805–1879)	Treasurer General of the Reverend Apostolic Camera	Papal States

=== Cardinals in pectore ===
Name	Title when named cardinal	Country	Revealed as Cardinal
Michele Viale-Prelà (1798–1860)	Apostolic Nuncio to Austria	France	7 March 1853
Giovanni Brunelli (1795–1861)	Apostolic Nuncio to Spain	Papal States	7 March 1853

== 7 March 1853 ==
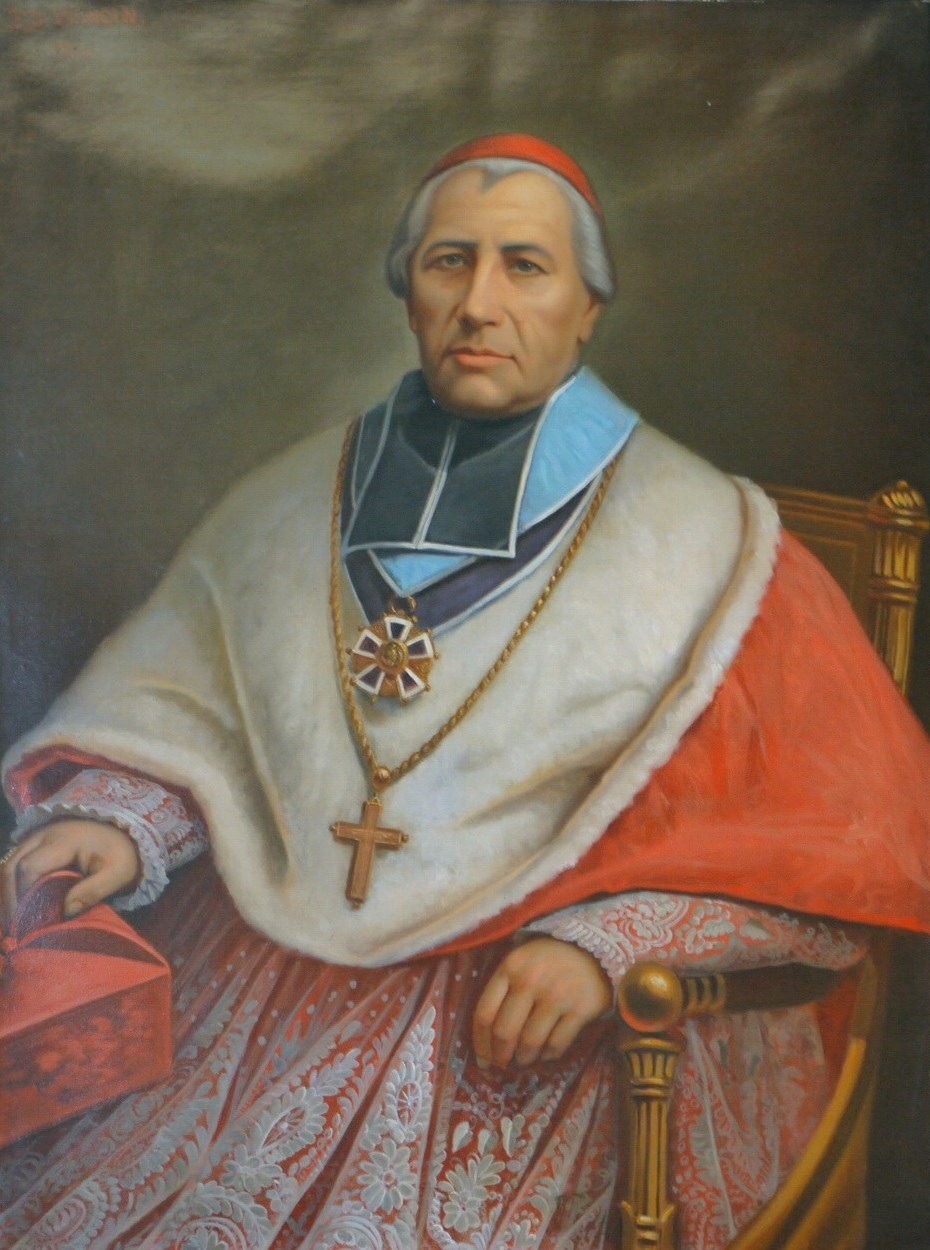
François-Nicholas-Madeleine Morlot (1795-1862), made a cardinal on 7 March 1853.

Name	Title when named cardinal	Country
János Scitovszky (1785–1866)	Archbishop of Esztergom	Austria
François-Nicholas-Madeleine Morlot (1795–1862)	Archbishop of Tours	France
Giusto Recanati OFM Cap (1789–1861)	Assistant to the papal throne	Papal States
Domenico Savelli (1792–1864)	Vice-Camerlengo of the Holy Roman Church	France
Prospero Caterini (1795–1881)	Assessor of the Sacred Congregation of the Inquisition	Papal States
Vincenzo Santucci (1796–1861)	Secretary of the Sacred Congregation for Extraordinary Ecclesiastical Affairs	Papal States

== 19 December 1853 ==
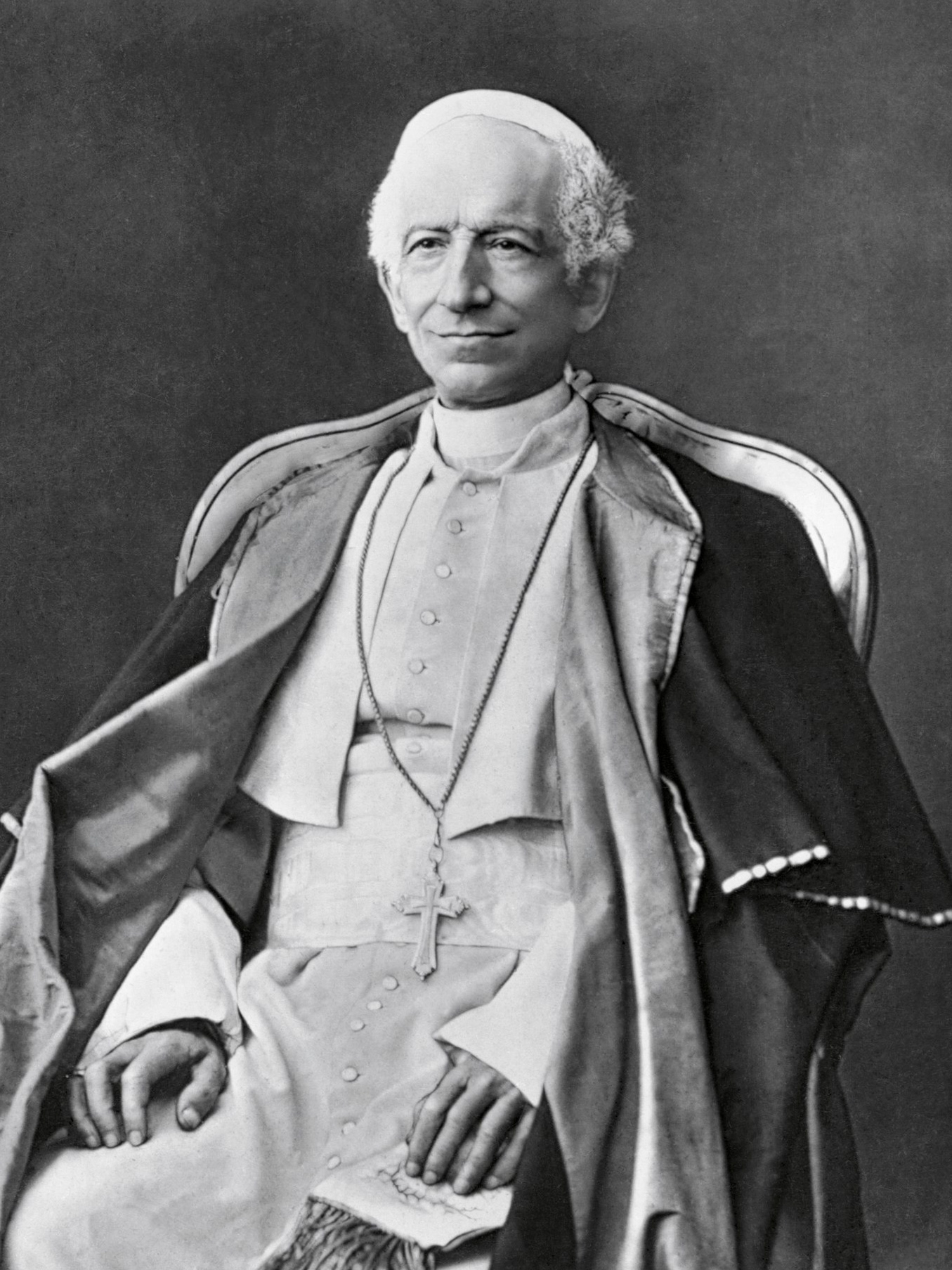
Gioacchino Pecci (1810–1903), made a cardinal on 19 December 1853, and elected as Pope Leo XIII on 20 February 1878.

Name	Title when named cardinal	Country
Gioacchino Pecci (1810–1903) (Note: Elected as Pope Leo XIII (1878–1903))	Archbishop-bishop of Perugia	Papal States

=== Cardinal in pectore ===
Name	Title when named cardinal	Country	Revealed as Cardinal
Camillo di Pietro (1806–1884)	Apostolic Nuncio to Portugal	Papal States	16 June 1856

== 17 December 1855 ==
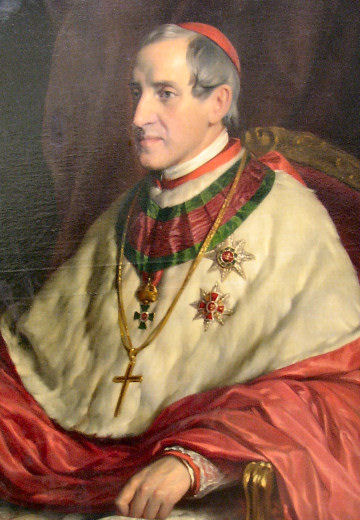
Joseph Othmar Rauscher (1797-1875), made a cardinal on 17 December 1855.

Name	Title when named cardinal	Country
Joseph Othmar Rauscher (1797–1875)	Archbishop of Vienna	Austria
Karl-August von Reisach (1800–1869)	Archbishop of Munich	Bavaria
Clément Villecourt (1787–1867)	Bishop of La Rochelle	France
Francesco Gaude OP (1809–1860)	Consultor of the Sacred Congregation of Bishops and Regulars	Sardinia

== 16 June 1856 ==
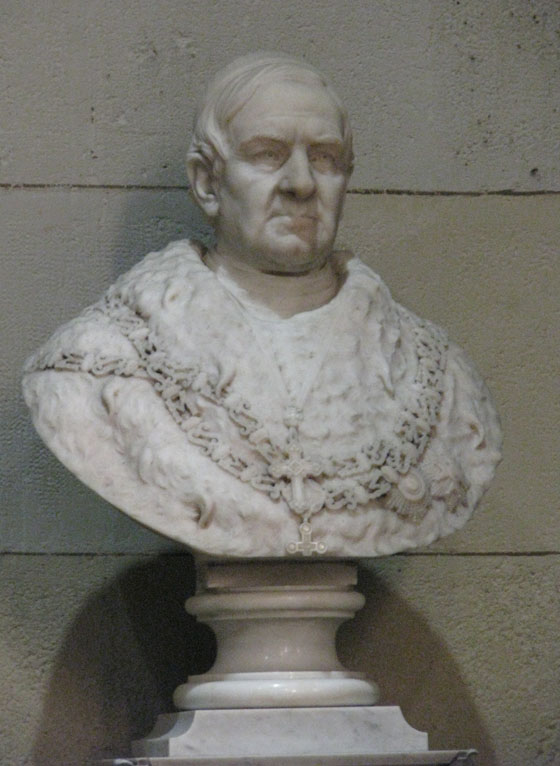
Juraj Haulik (1788-1869), made a cardinal on 16 June 1856.

Name	Title when named cardinal	Country
Mykhajlo Levitsky (1774–1858)	Archbishop of Kyiv–Galicia of the Ukrainians	Austria
Juraj Haulik (1788–1869)	Archbishop of Zagreb	Austria
Alessandro Barnabò (1801–1874)	Secretary of the Sacred Congregation of the Propagation of the Faith	Papal States
Gaspare Grassellini CO (1796–1875)	Pro-legate to Bologna	Two Sicilies
Francesco de' Medici di Ottaiano (1808–1857)	Prefect of the Prefecture of the Papal Household	Two Sicilies

== 15 March 1858 ==
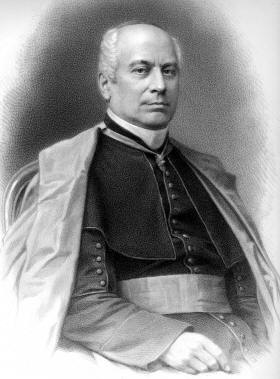
Teodolfo Mertel (1806–1899), made a cardinal on 15 March 1858.

Name	Title when named cardinal	Country
Cirilo de Alameda y Brea OFM (1781–1872)	Archbishop of Toledo	Spain
Antonio Benedetto Antonucci (1798–1879)	Bishop of Ancona and Umana	Papal States
Manuel Joaquín Tarancón y Morón (1782–1862)	Bishop of Sevilla	Spain
Enrico Orfei (1800–1870)	Bishop of Cesena	Papal States
Giuseppe Milesi Pironi Ferretti (1817–1873)	Minister of Commerce, Fine Arts and Public Works of the Papal States	Papal States
Pietro de Silvestri (1803–1875)	Dean of the Sacred Roman Rota	Papal States
Teodolfo Mertel (1806–1899) (Note: Lay cardinal)	Minister of the Interior and of Grace and Justice	Papal States

== 25 June 1858 ==
Name	Title when named cardinal	Country
Manuel Bento Rodrigues da Silva CRSJE (1800–1869)	Patriarch of Lisbon	Portugal

== 27 September 1861 ==
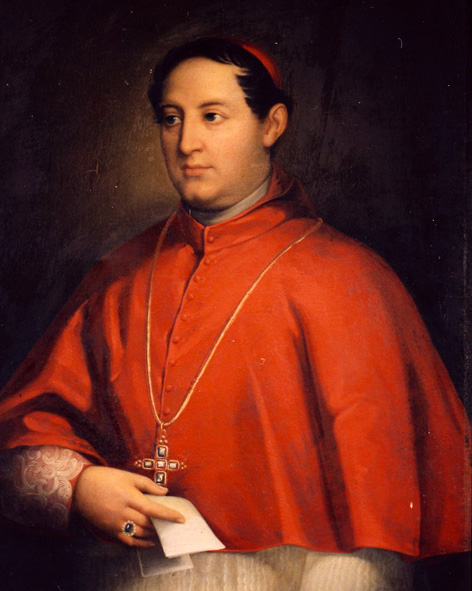
Gaetano Bedini (1806-64), made a cardinal on 27 September 1861.

Name	Title when named cardinal	Country
Alexis Billiet (1783–1873)	Archbishop of Chambéry	France
Carlo Sacconi (1808–1889)	Apostolic Nuncio to France	Italy
Miguel García Cuesta (1803–1873)	Archbishop of Santiago de Compostela	Spain
Gaetano Bedini (1806–1864)	Archbishop-bishop of Viterbo and Tuscanella	Papal States
Fernando de la Puente y Primo de Rivera (1808–1867)	Archbishop of Burgos	Spain
Angelo Quaglia (1802–1872)	Secretary of the Sacred Congregation of the Council	Papal States
Antonio Maria Panebianco OFM Conv (1808–1885)	Consultor of the Sacred Congregation of the Inquisition, and Sacred Congregation for Extraordinary Ecclesiastical Affairs	Italy

== 16 March 1863 ==
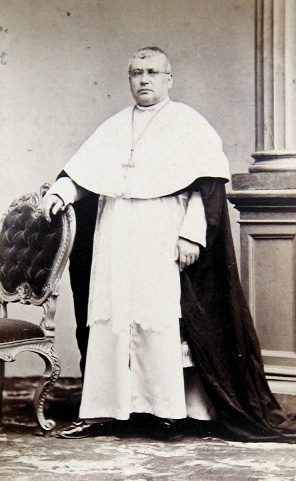
Filippo Maria Guidi (1815–1879), made a cardinal on 16 March 1863.

Name	Title when named cardinal	Country
Giuseppe Luigi Trevisanato (1801–1877)	Patriarch of Venice	Austria
Antonio Saverio De Luca (1805–1883)	Apostolic Nuncio to Austria	Italy
Giuseppe Andrea Bizzarri (1802–1877)	Secretary of the Sacred Congregation of Bishops and Regulars	Papal States
Luis de la Lastra y Cuesta (1803–1876)	Archbishop of Valladolid	Spain
Jean Baptiste François Pitra OSB (1812–1889)	Prior Emeritus of Saint-Germain-des-Prés	France
Filippo Maria Guidi OP (1815–1879)	Professor of Theology at University of Vienna	Italy
Francesco Pentini (1797–1869)	Dean of the Reverend Apostolic Camera	Papal States

== 11 December 1863 ==
Name	Title when named cardinal	Country
Henri-Marie-Gaston Boisnormand de Bonnechose (1800–1883)	Archbishop of Rouen	France

== 22 June 1866 ==
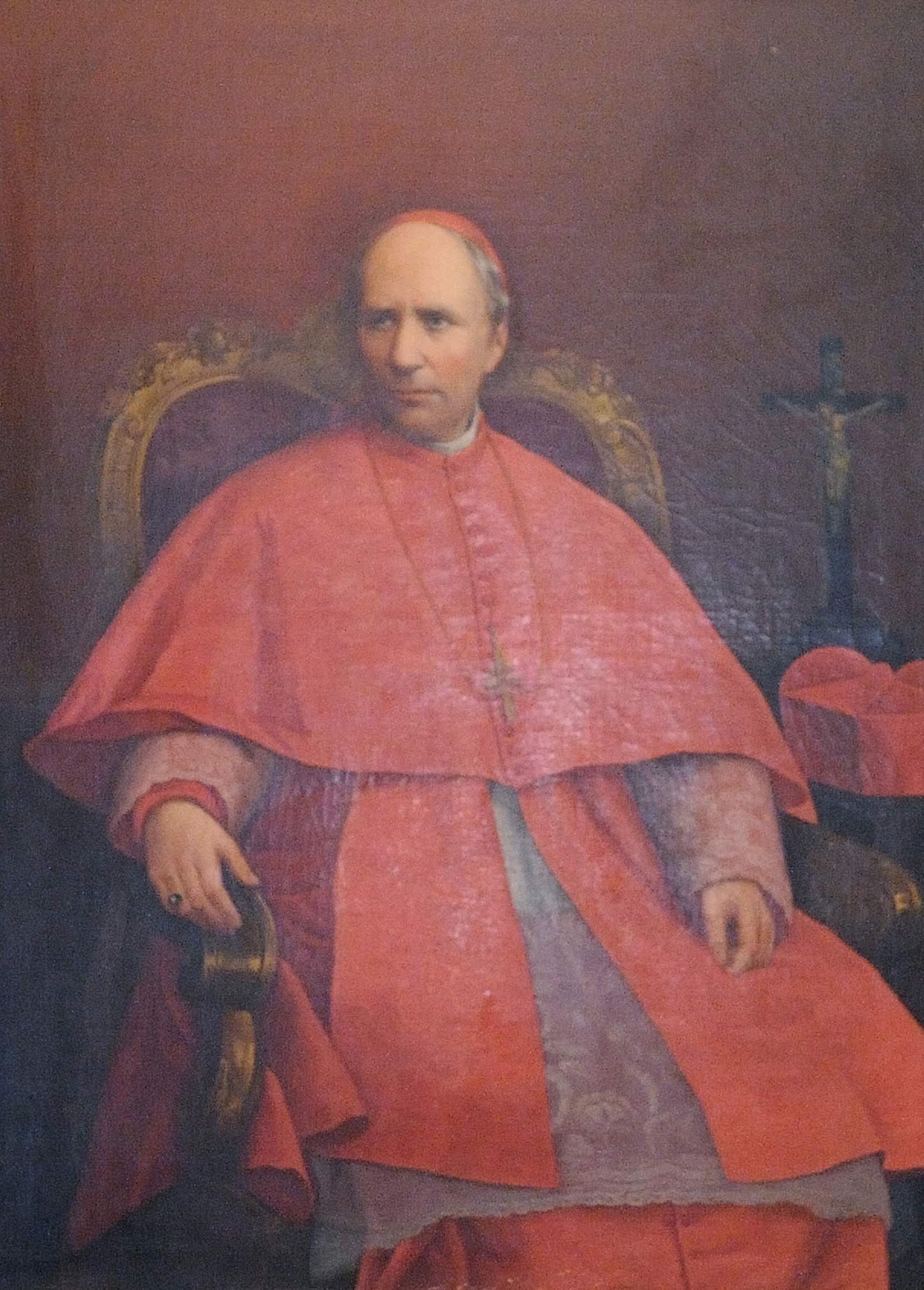
Paul Cullen (1803–1878), made a cardinal on 22 June 1866.

Pius announced the creation of five cardinals during a secret consistory on 22 June 1866, with three belonging to the rank of cardinal-priest (Cullen, Hohenlohe, and Bilio), and two to the rank of cardinal-deacon (Matteucci and Consolini). Cullen was the first Irish cardinal. The cardinals received their cardinalitial ring and title at a public consistory on June 25.

Name	Title when named cardinal	Country
Paul Cullen (1803–1878)	Archbishop of Dublin	United Kingdom
Gustav Adolf Hohenlohe (1823–1896)	Almoner of His Holiness	Bavaria
Luigi Bilio B (1826–1884)	Consultor for the Commission of Roman and Universal Inquisition, and Sacred Congregation of the Index	Italy
Antonio Matteucci (1802–1866)	Vice-Camerlengo of the Holy Roman Church	Italy
Domenico Consolini (1806–1884)	Vice-President of the Secretariat of State	Italy

== 13 March 1868 ==
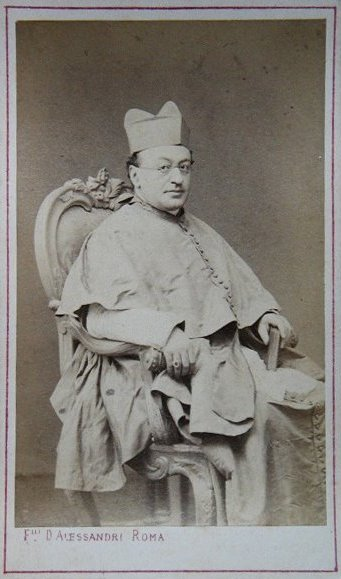
Raffaele Monaco La Valletta (1827-96), made a cardinal on 13 March 1868.

Pius announced the creation of nine cardinals during a secret consistory on the morning of 13 March 1868. He elevated Borromeo and Capalti to the rank of cardinal-deacon, with the remaining seven cardinals belonging to the rank of cardinal-priest.

Bonaparte, Gonella, Berardi, Monaco La Valletta, Borromeo, and Capalti received their cardinalitial hat, ring, and title at a public consistory on March 16. Ferrieri and Barili later received theirs at a secret consistory on September 24.

Name	Title when named cardinal	Country
Lucien Louis Joseph Napoleon Bonaparte (1828–1895)	Protonotary apostolic	Papal States
Innocenzo Ferrieri (1810–1887)	Apostolic Nuncio to Portugal	Italy
Matteo Eustachio Gonella (1802–1866)	Archbishop-bishop of Viterbo and Tuscanella	Papal States
Lorenzo Barili (1801–1875)	Apostolic Nuncio to Spain	Italy
Giuseppe Berardi (1810–1878)	Substitute for General Affairs of the Apostolic Secretariat	Papal States
Juan Ignacio Moreno y Maisanove (1817–1884)	Archbishop of Valladolid	Spain
Raffaele Monaco La Valletta (1827–1896)	Assessor of the Commission of Roman and Universal Inquisition	Italy
Edoardo Borromeo (1822–1881)	Prefect of the Prefecture of the Holy Apostolic Palaces	Italy
Annibale Capalti (1811–1877)	Secretary of the Sacred Congregation of the Propagation of the Faith	Papal States

== 22 December 1873 ==
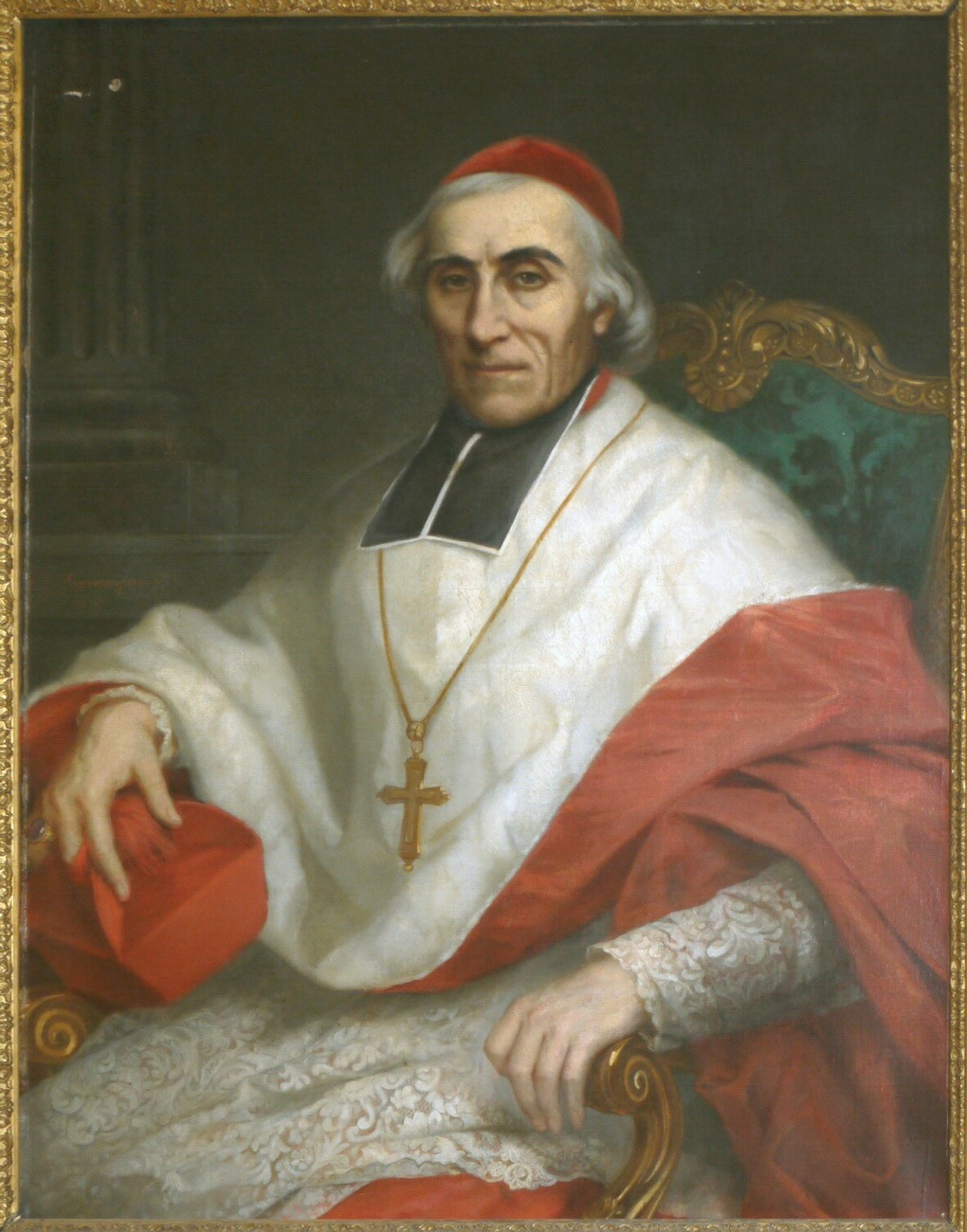
Joseph-Hippolyte Guibert (1802-86), made a cardinal on 22 December 1873.

Nascimento received his cardinal's hat, ring and titular church at a ceremony on 25 June 1877, whilst Guibert received his cardinal's hat as well. Regnier received his hat on 31 December 1877.

Name	Title when named cardinal	Country
Inácio do Nascimento de Morais Cardoso (1811–1883)	Patriarch of Lisbon	Portugal
René-François Régnier (1794–1881)	Archbishop of Cambrai	France
Maximilian Joseph von Tarnóczy (1806–1876)	Archbishop of Salzburg	Austria-Hungary
Flavio Chigi (1810–1885)	Apostolic Nuncio to France	Italy
Alessandro Franchi (1819–1878)	Apostolic Nuncio Emeritus to Spain	Italy
Joseph-Hippolyte Guibert OMI (1802–1886)	Archbishop of Paris	France
Mariano Falcinelli Antoniacci OSB Cas (1806–1874)	Apostolic Nuncio to Austria-Hungary	Italy
Mariano Benito Barrio y Fernández (1805–1876)	Archbishop of Valencia	Spain
Luigi Oreglia di Santo Stefano (1828–1913)	Apostolic Nuncio to Portugal	Italy
János Simor (1813–1891)	Archbishop of Esztergom	Austria-Hungary
Camillo Tarquini SJ (1810–1874)	Theologian of the Sacred Apostolic Penitentiary	Italy
Tommaso Martinelli OESA (1827–1888)	Consultor of the Sacred Congregation of the Index	Italy

== 15 March 1875 ==
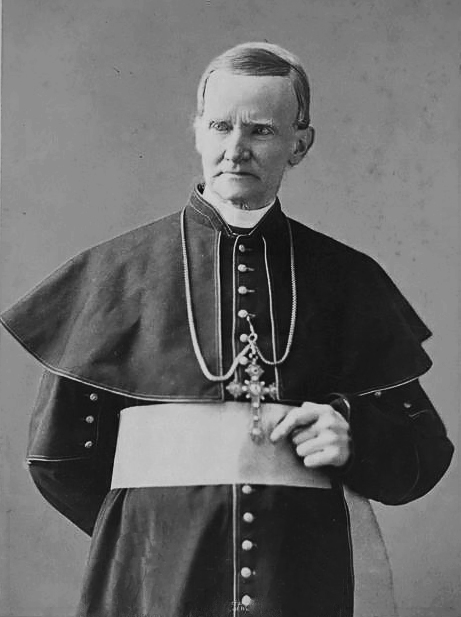
John McCloskey (1810–1885), made a cardinal on 15 March 1875.

Pius created eleven cardinals in his March 1875 consistory, reserving the names of five of them in pectore. Bartolini was given the rank of cardinal-deacon, while the remaining five cardinals announced at the time joined the rank of cardinal-priest.

McCloskey was the first American cardinal. He received the red biretta from Archbishop James Roosevelt Bayley in a ceremony at St. Patrick's Old Cathedral on 27 April 1875. Deschamps received his cardinalitial hat at a ceremony on 25 June 1877 while Manning received his on 31 December 1877.

At the time of his assignment, Ledóchowski had been in prison since 3 February 1874 for resisting the Kulturkampf. He was released and exiled from Poland on 3 February 1876, and subsequently received his ring and titular church from Pope Pius at a ceremony on 7 April 1876.

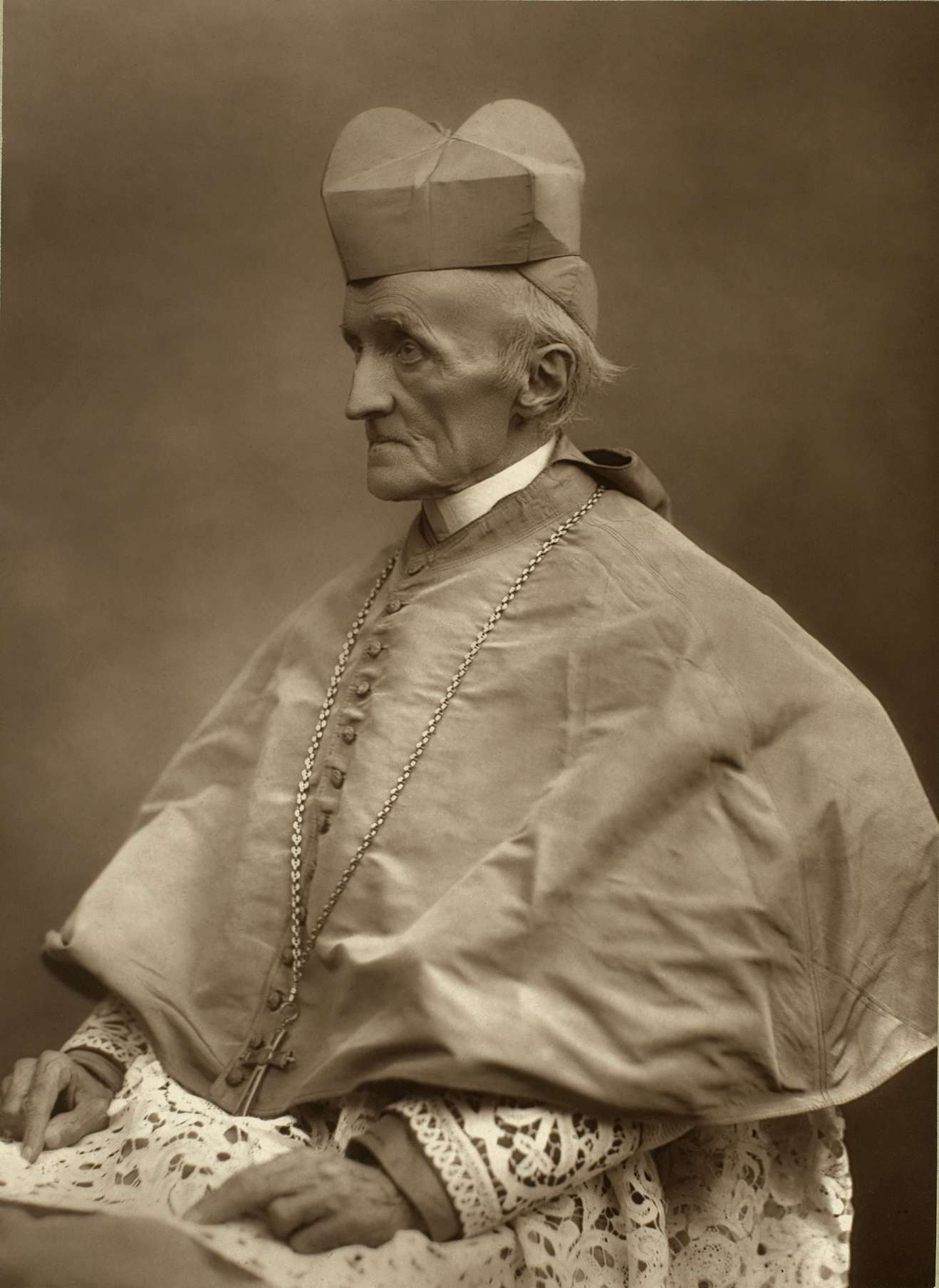
Henry Edward Manning (1808–1892), made a cardinal on 15 March 1875.

Name	Title when named cardinal	Country
Pietro Gianelli (1807–1881)	Secretary of the Sacred Congregation of the Council	Italy
Mieczysław Halka Ledóchowski (1822–1902)	Archbishop of Gniezno and of Poznań	Germany
John McCloskey (1810–1885)	Archbishop of New York	United States
Henry Edward Manning (1808–1892)	Archbishop of Westminster	United Kingdom
Victor-Auguste-Isidor Deschamps CSsR (1810–1883)	Archbishop of Mechelen	Belgium
Domenico Bartolini (1813–1887)	Secretary of the Sacred Congregation of Rites	Italy

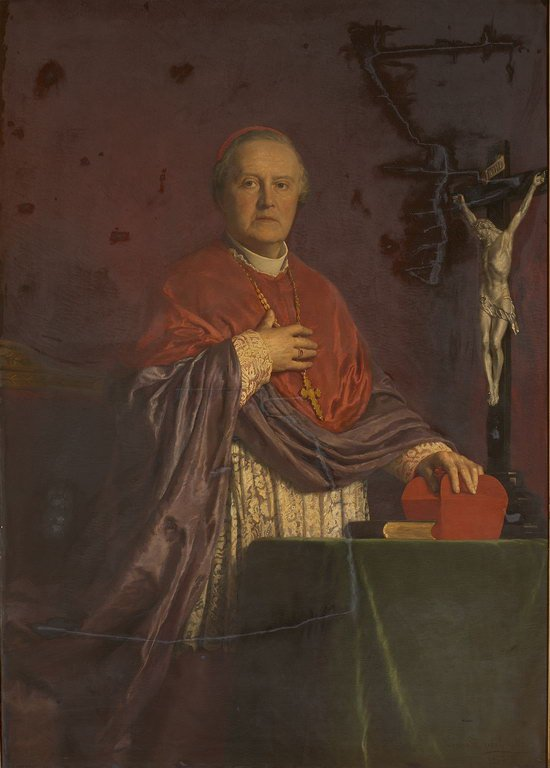
Victor-Auguste-Isidor Deschamps (1810–1883), made a cardinal on 15 March 1875.

=== Cardinal in pectore ===
Name	Title when named cardinal	Country	Revealed as Cardinal
Ruggero Luigi Emidio Antici Mattei (1811–1883)	Auditor General of the Reverend Apostolic Camera	Italy	17 September 1875
Salvatore Nobili Vitelleschi (1818–1875)	Secretary of the Sacred Congregation of Bishops and Regulars	Italy	17 September 1875
Giovanni Simeoni (1816–1892)	Apostolic Nuncio to Spain	Italy	17 September 1875
Lorenzo Ilarione Randi (1818–1887)	Vice-Camerlengo of the Holy Roman Church of the Reverend Apostolic Camera	Italy	17 September 1875
Bartolomeo Pacca, iuniore (Note: Not to be confused with his grand-uncle Bartolomeo Pacca.) (1817–1880)	Prefect of the Prefecture of the Holy Apostolic Palaces	Italy	17 September 1875

== 17 September 1875 ==
In this consistory, Pius created one cardinal, and revealed the names of the five cardinals that had been named in pectore on March 15. Among the in pectore cardinals who were published, Pacca and Randi were given the rank of cardinal-deacon, while the remaining three cardinals were elevated to the rank of cardinal-priest. Additionally, Brossais-Saint-Marc was also elevated to the rank of cardinal-priest.

Among the cardinals made in pectore, Vitelleschi, Randi, and Pacca received their rings and titles at a ceremony on 23 September, while Antici Mattei received his on 28 January 1876. Simeone was the last to receive his ring and titular church, doing so on 18 December 1876.

Cardinal Brossais-Saint-Marc received his titular church and cardinal ring at a ceremony on 3 April 1876 and his cardinalitial hat on 31 December 1877.

Name	Title when named cardinal	Country
Godefroy Brossais-Saint-Marc (1803–1878)	Archbishop of Rennes	France

== 3 April 1876 ==
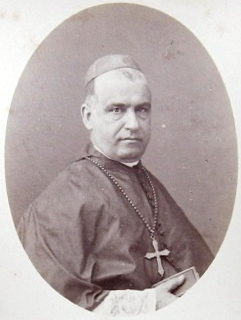
Bartolomeo D’Avanzo (1811–1884), made a cardinal on 3 April 1876.

Pius announced the creation of two cardinals on 3 April 1876, raising both to the rank of cardinal-priest. They received their rings and titular church in a ceremony held on April 7.

Name	Title when named cardinal	Country
Bartolomeo D’Avanzo (1811–1884)	Bishop of Calvi	Italy
Johannes Baptist Franzelin SJ (1816–1886)	Consultor for the Sacred Congregation for Extraordinary Ecclesiastical Affairs, Sacred Congregation of the Propagation of the Faith, and Sacred Congregation of the Council	Austria-Hungary

== 12 March 1877 ==
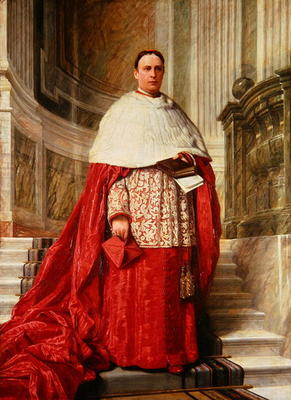
Edward Henry Howard (1829–1892), made a cardinal on 12 March 1877.

At a consistory on 12 March 1877, Pius created 11 cardinals. He elevated Nina, Sbaretti, and De Falloux as cardinal-deacons, while the remaining 8 cardinals were made cardinal-priests.

At a ceremony shortly after, Pius bestowed the cardinal's ring, hat and cardinalitial title to Apuzzo, Howard, Canossa, Serafini, Nina, Sbarretti, and De Falloux. Meanwhile, Benavides, Paya, and Caverot received theirs at a ceremony on 25 June, while Garcia Gil received his on September 21.

Name	Title when named cardinal	Country
Francisco de Paula Benavides y Navarrete (1810–1895)	Patriarch of West Indies (Note: Titular see based in Rome.)	Spain
Francesco Saverio Apuzzo (1807–1880)	Archbishop of Capua	Italy
Manuel García Gil OP (1802–1881)	Archbishop of Zaragoza	Spain
Edward Henry Howard (1829–1892)	Titular bishop of Neocaesarea in Ponto	United Kingdom
Miguel Payá y Rico (1811–1891)	Archbishop of Santiago de Compostela	Spain
Louis-Marie Caverot (1806–1887)	Archbishop of Lyon	France
Luigi di Canossa (1809–1900)	Bishop of Verona	Italy
Luigi Serafini (1808–1894)	Bishop of Viterbo and Tuscanella	Italy
Lorenzo Nina (1812–1885)	Assessor of the Commission of Roman and Universal Inquisition	Italy
Enea Sbarretti (1808–1884)	Secretary of the Sacred Congregation of Bishops and Regulars	Italy
Frédéric de Falloux du Coudray (1815–1884)	Regent of the Apostolic Chancery	France

== 22 June 1877 ==
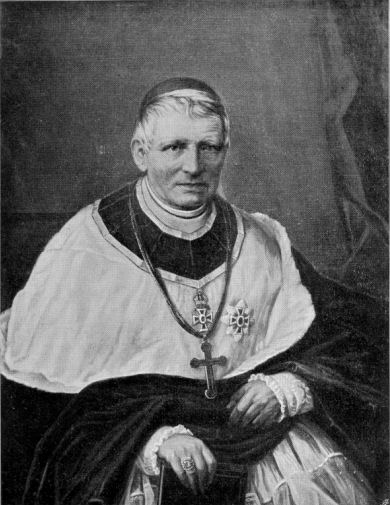
Johann Rudolf Kutschker (1810-81), made a cardinal on 22 June 1877.

Pope Pius created three cardinals, all belonging to the order of cardinal-priest. They received their hat, ring and titular church at a ceremony on 25 June 1877.

Name	Title when named cardinal	Country
Josip Mihalovic (1814–1891)	Archbishop of Zagreb	Austria-Hungary
Johann Rudolf Kutschker (1810–1881)	Archbishop of Vienna	Austria-Hungary
Lucido Parocchi (1833–1903)	Archbishop of Bologna	Italy

== 28 December 1877 ==
Pius created two cardinals at a secret consistory on 28 December 1877. Moretti was made a cardinal-priest, while Pellegrini a cardinal-deacon. They received their cardinal's hat and cardinalitial title at a ceremony on 31 December 1877.

Name	Title when named cardinal	Country
Vincenzo Moretti (1815–1881)	Archbishop of Ravenna	Italy
Antonio Pellegrini (1812–1887)	Dean of the Reverend Apostolic Camera	Italy

== Planned Elevations ==
Juan Cayetano Gómez de Portugal y Solís, the Bishop of Michoacán, was slated to be elevated to the cardinalate in 1850, but he died on 4 April 1850. Shortly after his death, a letter arrived from Cardinal Giacomo Antonelli announcing that Pope Pius IX is planning to elevate him to the dignity of Cardinal. He would have been the first cardinal from Latin American and the American continent.

In a letter addressed on 6 March 1856, Prosper Guéranger claimed that he refused an offer from Pius on November 1855 to be made a cardinal, as he did not want to move to Rome. As a result, Clément Villecourt was made a cardinal instead.

Ahead of the consistory on 27 September 1861, Pius reportedly offered the cardinalate to Ignazio Alberghini, the Dean of the Sacred Roman Rota. Alberghini declined the promotion, instead retiring on September 16. Also intended for this consistory was Angelo Ramazzotti, the Patriarch of Venice, despite the latter's objections on account of his poor health and financial hardship. Before he could be elevated however, Ramazzotti died on September 24.

Pius had intended to elevate Leon Michał Przyłuski, Archbishop of Gniezno, to the cardinalate in 1865, but the latter died on 12 March 1865, before the consistory could be held to make him a cardinal.

Pius planned to elevate Andrea Pila, the Auditor General of the Reverend Apostolic Camera, to the College of Cardinals on 24 April 1868. However, Pila died the day before the consistory, in which he would have been the only elevation.

Ahead of the opening of the First Vatican Council on 8 December 1869, Pius wanted to name a Barnabite cardinal. He approached Carlo Vercellone, who refused on account of old age and poor health and instead proposed the name of Luigi Bilio.

According to Cruz through a story relayed by Ramón Ángel Jara, Mariano Casanova reportedly claimed that Pius was impressed by the performance of José Hipólito Salas, the Bishop of Concepcion, at the First Vatican Council and offered Salas to remain in Rome as a member of the College of Cardinals. Salas would have been the first cardinal from South America, but refused the honor due to his desire to spend his last years in Chile.

Xavier de Mérode, the Almoner of His Holiness, died of acute pneumonia on 11 July 1874, a few months before the consistory that would have made him a cardinal.

Augusto Negroni, the Auditor General of the Reverend Apostolic Camera, was offered the cardinalate but declined in favor of joining the Jesuits on 20 June 1874.

== Additional sources ==
- Martin, Frederick, ed. (1876). "Church of Rome". The Statesman's Yearbook. Macmillan and Co.: 301ff. "On December 1, 1875.... The following list gives the names of these fifty-seven cardinals, together with their office, or dignity, if any, their nationality, year of birth, and year of nomination...."
- Miranda, Salvador. "Consistories for the creation of Cardinals 19th Century (1800-1903): Pius IX". The Cardinals of the Holy Roman Church. Florida International University. OCLC 53276621.
