= Fernando de la Puente y Primo de Rivera =

Spanish prelate of the Catholic Church (1808–1867)

His Eminence Doctor Fernando de la Puente y Primo de Rivera
- Cardinal Priest of Santa Maria della Pace
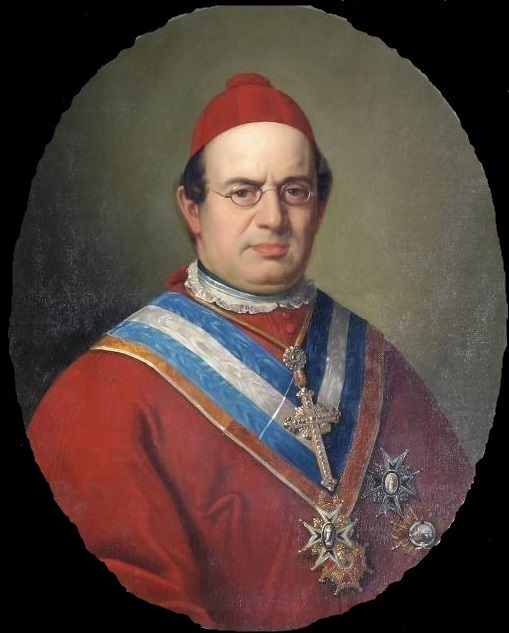
- Church: Catholic
- Province: Rome
- Appointed: 21 May 1862
- Term ended: 12 March 1867
- Predecessor: Juan Jose Bonel y Orbe
- Successor: Juan Ignacio Moreno y Maisanove
- Previous posts: Bishop of Salamanca (1852–1857); Archbishop of Burgos (1857–1867)

Orders
- Ordination: 1832
- Consecration: 19 December 1852 by Giovanni Brunelli
- Created cardinal: 27 September 1861 by Pope Pius IX

Personal details
- Born: 28 August 1808 Cádiz, Spain
- Died: 12 March 1867 (aged 58) Madrid, Spain
- Education: University of Sevilla
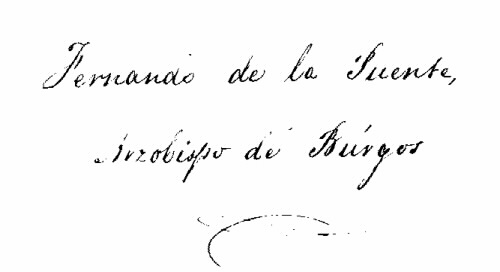
- Signature

Doctor Fernando de la Puente y Primo de Rivera (28 August 1808 – 12 March 1867) was a Spanish cardinal of the Catholic Church. He was appointed by Pope Pius IX in 1861. He served as the Bishop of Salamanca from 1852 to 1857, the Archbishop of Burgos from 1857 to 1867, and as the Cardinal Priest of Santa Maria della Pace from 1862 to 1867.

== Early life ==
Fernando de la Puente y Primo de Rivera was born on 28 August 1808 in Cádiz, Spain. At age twelve, he was orphaned and later studied at a school in England. He returned to Spain in 1832, began attending the University of Sevilla, and was ordained as a priest. He received his Doctorate in theology in 1839 and began teaching both theology and English at the university.

== Episcopal career ==
He served as the parish priest of San Miguel in Sevilla from 1841 until 1847, when he was appointed as auditor of the Tribunal de la Rota in Madrid. On 27 September 1852, he was proclaimed as Bishop of Salamanca, and was consecrated on 19 December 1852 by Giovanni Brunelli, the Apostolic Nuncio to Spain.

On 25 September 1857, Puente y Primo de Rivera was proclaimed as Archbishop of Burgos. He consecrated Juan Nepomuceno Garcia Gómez as Bishop of Coria in 1858. On 27 September 1861, he was made a cardinal by Pope Pius IX. On 21 May 1862, he was appointed as the Cardinal Priest of Santa Maria della Pace in Rome. He attended the canonization of 26 Martyrs of Japan on 8 June 1862. In 1864, he was selected by Queen Isabella II of Spain to be the moral and religious teacher of Prince Alfonso, however, he was relieved of his position by Leopoldo O'Donnell y Jorris for presenting an exposition against the recognition of Victor Emmanuel II as King of Italy.

== Death ==
Puente y Primo de Rivera died on 12 March 1867 in Madrid, Spain, aged 58.

== See also ==
- Cardinals created by Pius IX

Catholic Church titles
Preceded by Juan Jose Bonel y Orbe	Cardinal Priest of Santa Maria della Pace; 1862–1867	Succeeded by Juan Ignacio Moreno y Maisanove
Preceded by Cirilo Alameda y Brea, OFM	Archbishop of Burgos; 1857–1867	Succeeded by Anastasio Rodrigo Yusto
Preceded by Antolín García Lozano	Bishop of Salamanca; 1852–1857	Succeeded by Anastasio Rodrigo Yusto
