= Santi Vito e Modesto, Rome =

Roman Catholic church in Italy

Coordinates: 41°53′45″N 12°30′06″E

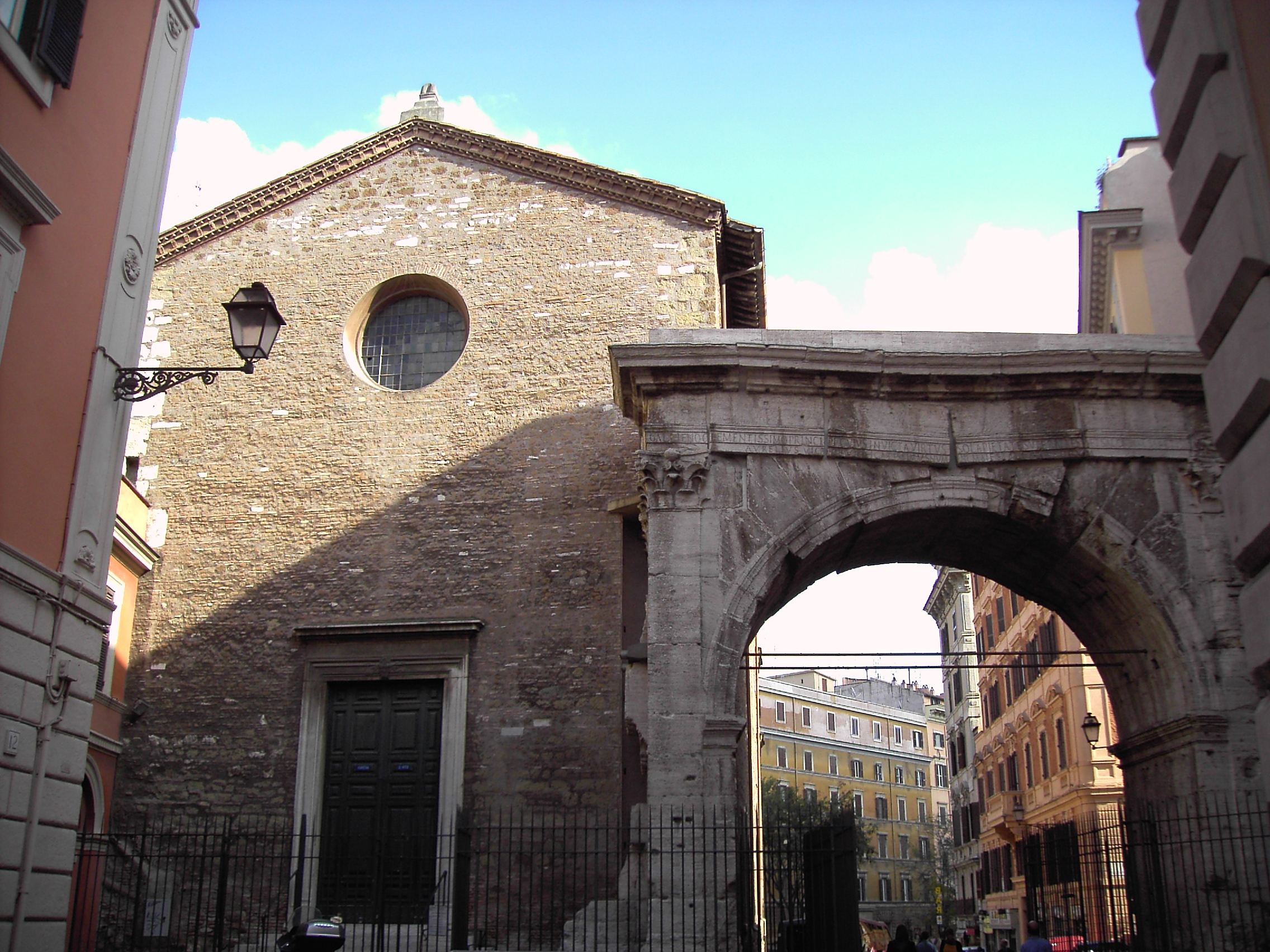
Apse of church with facade on Via San Vito and the adjacent Arch of Gallienus

Santi Vito e Modesto is a Roman Catholic church, and appears to have two facades, a 20th-century marble facade on Via Carlo Alberto, but a rustic brick older entrance, in reality the apse, on the Via San Vito in the Rione Esquilino of Rome, Italy. It has also been called Santi Vito, Modesto e Crescenzia (Saints Vito, Modesto and Crescenzia). It is located in the Rione Esquilino, adjacent to the Servian Wall, near the former Monastery of the Viperesche.

== History ==
This area was previously part of the Macellum Liviae, and the market included a inside a large basilica building, later a church, putative identified as the Basilica Sicinium (now identified with the church of Santa Maria Maggiore) mentioned by the historian Ammianus Marcellinus in the 4th century. After the persecutions of Domitian, the area was called the Macello Martyrum or "marketplace of the martyrs".

A church, titled San Vito in Macello Martyrum was first recorded in the Liber Pontificalis for the reign of Pope Leo III (795–816). The church was dedicated to St. Vitus, a 4th-century martyr in Sicily. He became very popular during the Middle Ages as the patron saint of those suffering from epilepsy, and was venerated as one of the Fourteen Holy Helpers. In England and other countries his name was mutated into "Guy" (as in Guy Fawkes), which in Italian became Guido.

The church was described as a diaconia, a center for the Church's charitable activities and received donations from Pope Leo. This implies that it was founded when there was still a local residential population to be served from the time of its founding, likely in the 6th century, as the Esquiline began to lose its population about that time. Possibly in line with its ancient orientation, it became a titular church for a Cardinal Deacon in 1088. The first cardinal to receive this title was Leo of Ostia, a Benedictine monk.

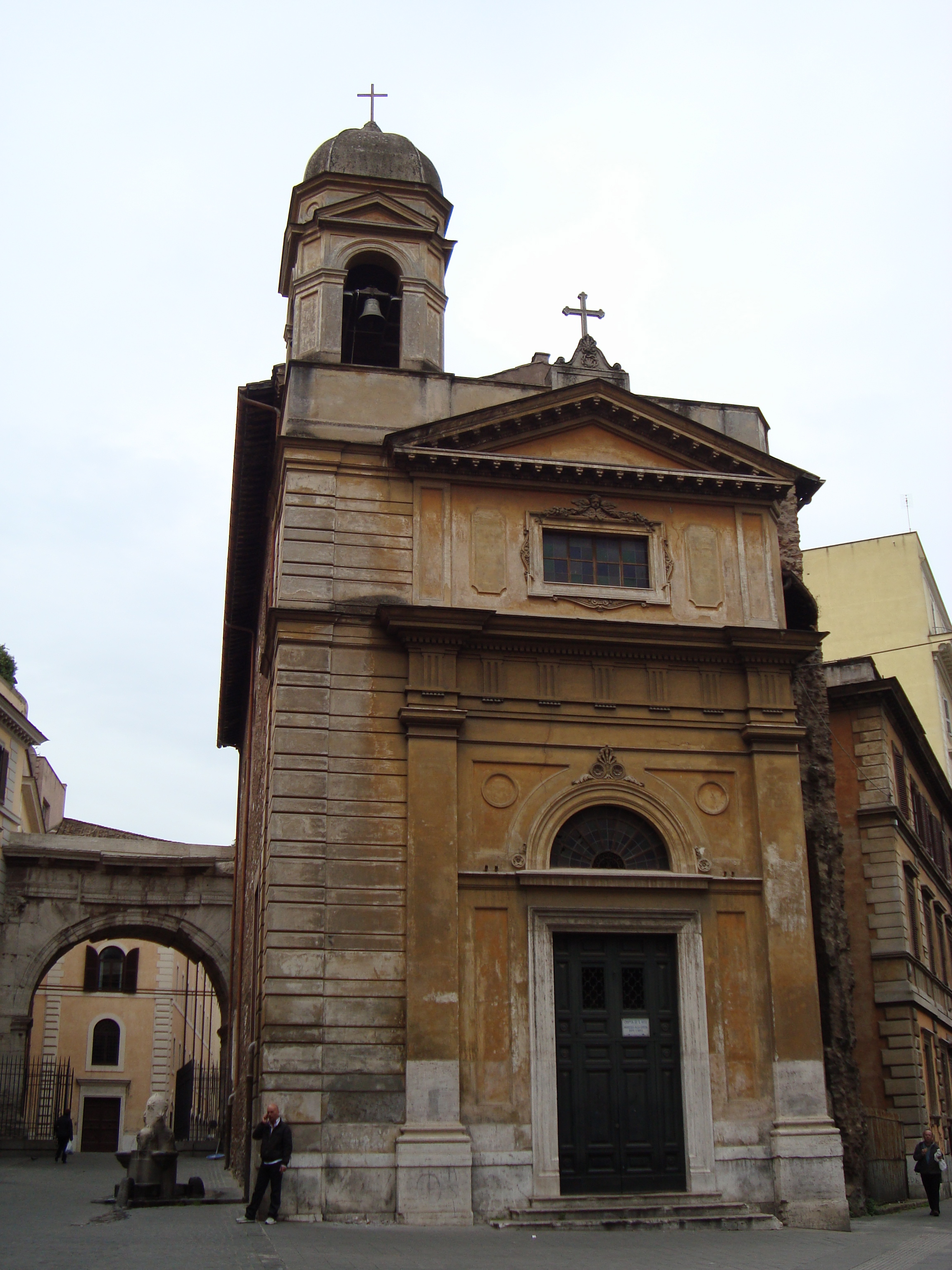
Facade of church on Via Carlo Alberto

In that same period a legend describing the martyrdom of St. Vitus became popular. This legend associated him with two other martyrs called Modestus and Crescentia who were identified as a married couple, his childhood tutor and nursemaid. As a result, the church was renamed San Vitale e Modesto in Macello Martyrum, which was also the name of the cardinalate. Later in the Middle Ages the cardinalate was renamed Santi Vitale, Modesto e Crescentia, but the church came to be called simply Santi Vito e Modesto, and the Macello Martyrum was forgotten.

By the 15th century the church had fallen into ruins. One source mentions the church was always suspect due to links to heresy under Pope Damasus I in the 4th century. It was rebuilt a parish church by 1474-1477 by Pope Sixtus IV near the original site. The church has housed multiple orders: in the 15th century, it was linked to nuns under the order of St Bernard. In 1685, it was entrusted to the Cistercian monks. They established a small monastery adjacent to the church, which served as the residence of the Procurator General of the Order. Later it passed on to other clerical orders. In 1834, the church had a major restoration under the architect Pietro Camporese il Giovane, and in 1900 by Alfredo Ricci who added the modern facade.

According to Mas Latrie, this deaconry became a title from 1477 until 1480, when it was returned to its older rank as a Cardinal-Deaconry. and again in 1565 when Pope Pius IV (1559–1565) created 23 new cardinals. It underwent a series of reconstructions in the following centuries. In the 19th century, it was occupied by a Polish order, known for ministering to the rabid. Pope Sixtus V listed it among the deaconries in his apostolic constitution Religiosa.

The interior has frescoes of the Madonna, child, and Saints attributed to Antoniazzo Romano. It also has 19th-century frescoes depicting the Madonna offering the Rosary to Saints Dominic and Catherine of Siena. The main altar has a painting by Pasqualino Marini.

The current Cardinal Deacon is Giuseppe Bertello, appointed in 2012 by Pope Benedict XVI.

== Cardinal Deacons since 1754 ==
- Luigi Maria Torregiani (1754–1765)
- Andrea Negroni (1765–1779)
- Giovanni Serafini (1843–1846)
- Vincenzo Santucci (1853–1854)
- Gaspare Grasselini (1856–1867)
- Edoardo Borromeo (1868–1878)
- Carlo Cristofori (1885–1891)
- Francesco di Paola Cassetta, in commendam (1901–1919)
- Eugène Tisserant (1936–1937); pro illa vice title (1937–1939)
- José Bueno y Monreal, pro illa vice title (1958–1987)
- Umberto Betti, O.F.M. (2007–2009)
- Giuseppe Bertello (2012– )

== Bibliography ==
- Odescalchi Pietro (1837). Notizie de' nuovi lavori eseguiti nella diaconia de' Ss. Vito e Modesto. Roma, tip. Aureli, 1837.
