= Cardinal Borromeo =

Cardinal Borromeo may refer to:

- Charles Borromeo (1538–1584), Italian saint, cardinal archbishop of Milan from 1564 to 1584
- Federico Borromeo (1564–1631), Italian cardinal from 1587, archbishop of Milan from 1595, patron of art
- Edoardo Borromeo (1822–1881), Italian cardinal from 1868, Camerlengo of the Holy Roman Church

== See also ==
- House of Borromeo, to which all belonged
