= Santa Maria della Concezione =

Santa Maria della Concezione is the name of several churches.

- Santa Maria della Concezione dei Cappuccini in Rome
- Santa Maria della Concezione in Campo Marzio in Rome
- Santa Maria della Concezione delle Viperesche in Rome
- Santa Maria della Concezione a Montecalvario in Naples
