= Barnabò =

Barnabò is an Italian surname. Notable people with the surname include:

- Alessandro Barnabò (1801–1874), Italian catholic cardinal
- Guglielmo Barnabò (1888–1954), Italian actor
