= Umberto Betti =

Italian Roman Catholic prelate

His Eminence Umberto Betti O.F.M.
- Cardinal-Deacon of Santi Vito, Modesto e Crescenzia
- Church: Roman Catholic Church
- Appointed: 24 November 2007
- Term ended: 1 April 2009
- Predecessor: José María Bueno y Monreal
- Successor: Giuseppe Bertello
- Previous post: Rector Magnificus of the Pontifical Lateran University (1991-95)

Orders
- Ordination: 6 April 1946
- Created cardinal: 24 November 2007 by Pope Benedict XVI
- Rank: Cardinal-Deacon

Personal details
- Born: Umberto Betti; 7 March 1922 Pieve Santo Stefano, Arezzo, Kingdom of Italy
- Died: 1 April 2009 (aged 87) Provincial Infirmary of Saint Francis, Fiesole, Italy
- Education: Pontifical University Antonianum; Université catholique de Louvain
- Motto: Dilexit ecclesiam
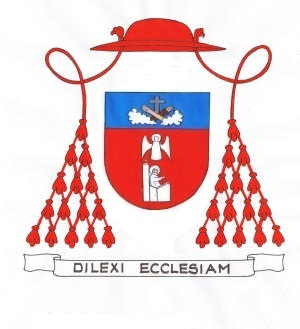
- Coat of arms: Umberto Betti's coat of arms

Styles of Umberto Betti
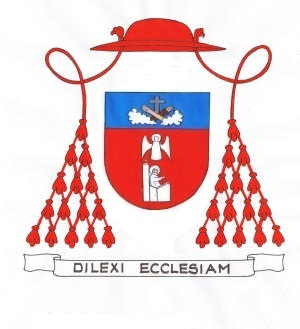
- Reference style: His Eminence
- Spoken style: Your Eminence
- Informal style: Cardinal

Umberto Betti, O.F.M., S.T.D. (7 March 1922 – 1 April 2009) was an Italian priest of the Order of Friars Minor who on 24 November 2007 was appointed a cardinal-deacon of the Roman Catholic Church.

Betti was born in Pieve Santo Stefano, Province of Arezzo. He began his novitiate in the Province of St. Francis Stigmatised in Tuscany on 23 July 1937, made his first profession on 2 August 1938 and his solemn profession on 31 December 1943. He was ordained priest on 5 April 1946.

He obtained his doctorate in Dogmatic Theology and followed specialised studies at the Catholic University of Louvain in 1951-1951, after which he taught dogmatic theology in the order's study houses in Siena and Fiesole, and again in 1963–1964, after which he was appointed professor at the Pontifical University Antonianum in Rome, where he taught until 1991.

He was a consultant to the Preparatory Theological Commission for the Vatican II Council, in which he was also an expert. He contributed to the writing of the Dogmatic Constitutions Dei Verbum and Lumen Gentium, and held several posts in the Roman Curia. He was Rector Magnificus of the Pontifical Lateran University from 1991 to 1995.

On 24 November 2007, Betti was raised to the rank of Cardinal-Deacon and assigned the titular church of Ss. Vito, Modesto e Crescenzia. He died aged 87 at the Provincial Infirmary of St. Francis on the hill of Fiesole, where he had lived since the year 2000.
