= Juan Espina y Capó =

Spanish painter and engraver

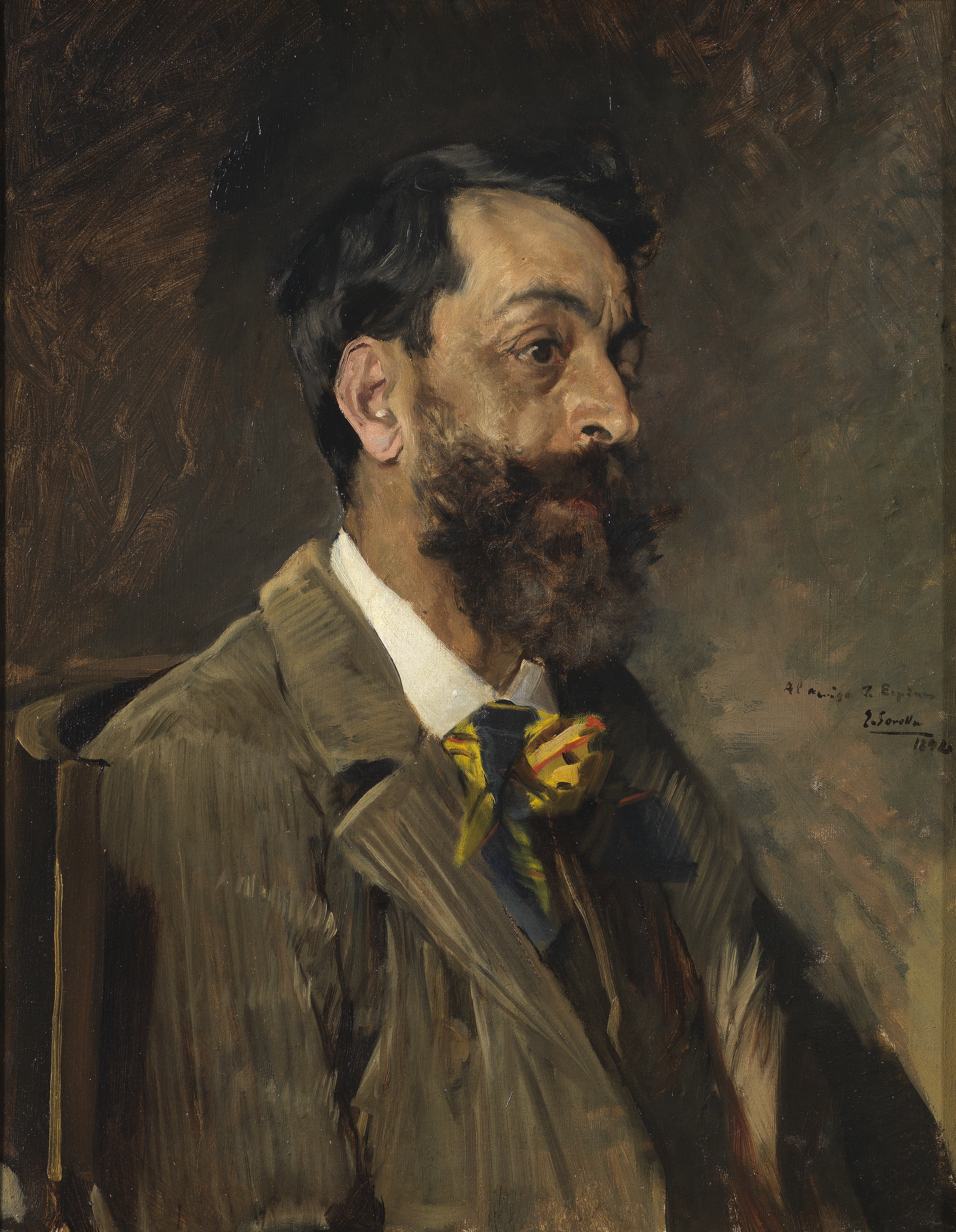
Juan Espina y Capó; portrait by Joaquín Sorolla (1892)

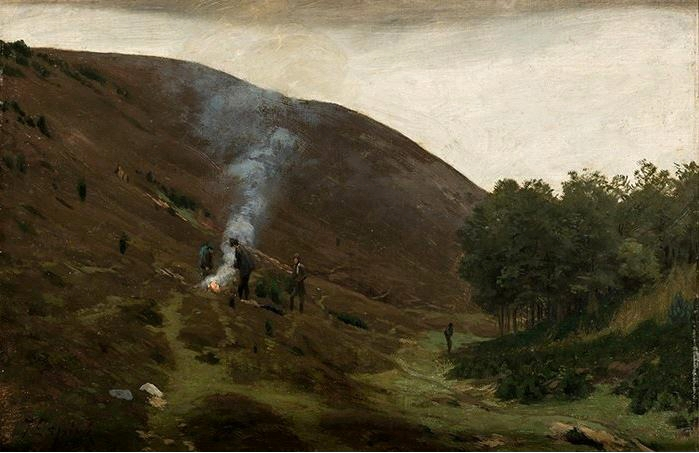
Mountain Landscape with People Starting a Bonfire

Juan Espina y Capó (1848, Madrid - 15 December 1933, Madrid) was a Spanish painter and engraver, influenced by the Barbizon school, who specialized in landscapes.

== Biography ==
His father, Pedro Espina Martínez (1815-1883), was a doctor. His younger brother, Antonio was also a doctor and his son, Antonio, became a writer and politician.

At the age of only fifteen, he went to Paris. Upon his return, he enrolled at the "Escuela Especial de Pintura, Escultura y Grabado" of the Real Academia de Bellas Artes de San Fernando. There, he studied with the Belgian-born landscape painter, Carlos de Haes.

In 1872, he was awarded a stipend to study at the Spanish Academy in Rome for three years. After graduating, he travelled through North Africa and spent more time in Paris before returning home.

He was regular participant in the National Exhibition of Fine Arts; winning a third-class medal in 1881, and second-class medals in 1884 and 1895. In 1926, he won a first-class medal for his etchings. He was also a founding member of the "Asociación de Pintores y Escultores de Madrid", and served as their Secretary. In 1931, the Real Academia named him an Academician.

Internationally, he represented Spain at the Berlin Jubilee Art Exhibition (1886), the Wiener Musik- und Theaterausstellung 1892 and the World's Columbian Exposition (1893). He also helped organized the first Salón de Otoño (Salon d'Automne) in Madrid and the Certamen de Arte Español in St. Petersburg (1900).

There is a cultural center in the Torrejón de Velasco district of Madrid that bears his name.

== Sources ==
- Javier Barón and José Luis Díez, El siglo XIX en el Prado, Museo Nacional del Prado, 2007 ISBN 978-84-8480-126-9
- Several authors, Madrid 1898, March-April 1998, Ayuntamiento de Madrid, ISBN 84-88406-24-X
