= Gaspare Grasselini =

Italian cardinal

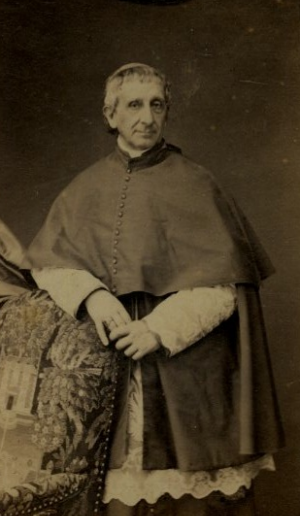
Gaspare Grassellini Portrait

Gaspare Grasselini (Palermo, January 19, 1796 - Frascati, September 16, 1875) was an Italian Cardinal who was Cardinal Deacon of Santi Vito, Modesto e Crescenzio from 1856 to 1867.
