= Juan José Bonel y Orbe =

Spanish Catholic ecclesiastic, bishop, archbishop and cardinal

His Eminence Juan José Bonel y Orbe
- Archbishop of Toledo; Primate of Spain
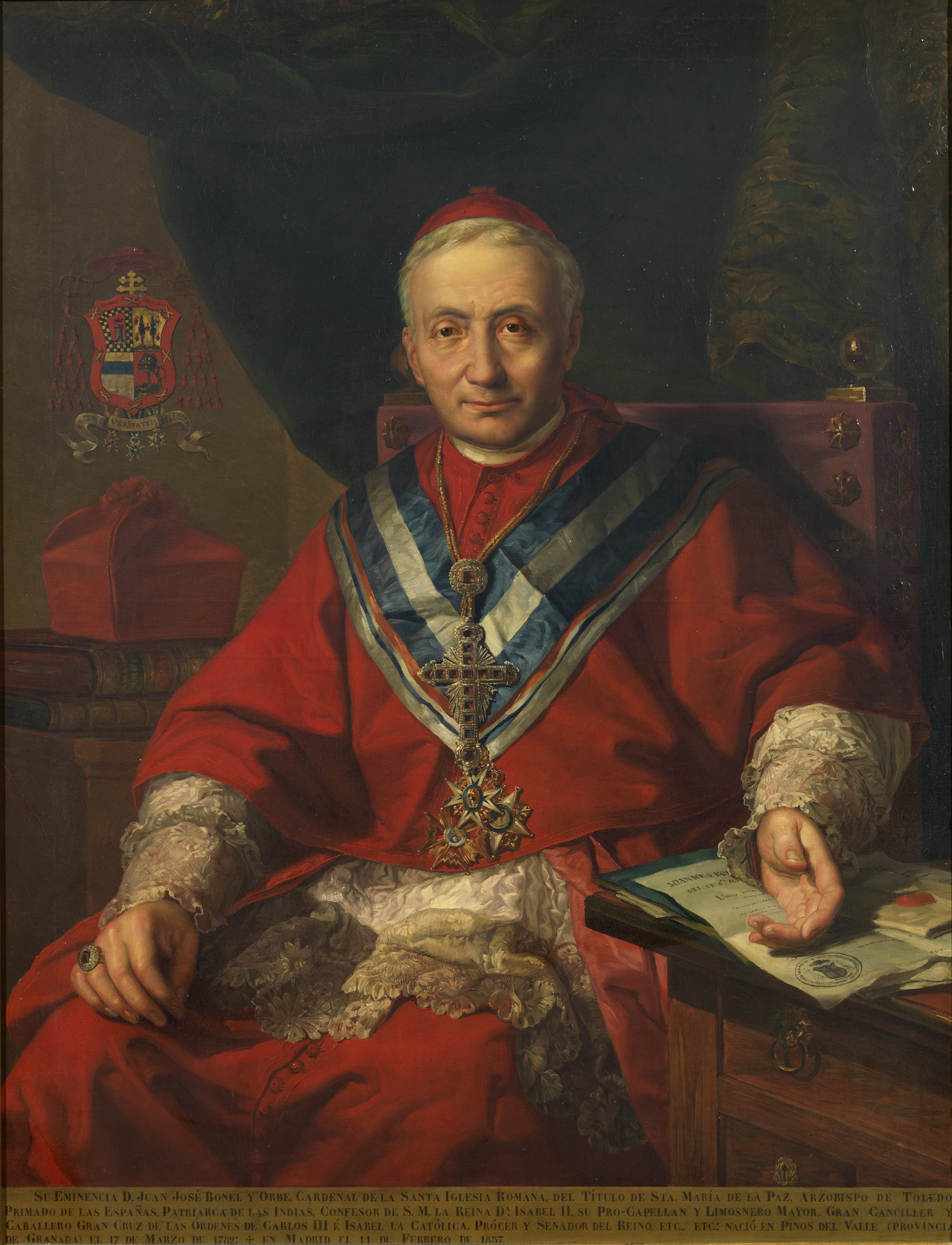
- Cardinal Juan José Bonel y Orbe. Bernardo López Piquer. (Museo del Prado).
- Church: Roman Catholic
- In office: 1847–1857
- Predecessor: Pedro Inguanzo y Rivero
- Successor: Cirilo de Alameda y Brea
- Other post: Cardinal-priest of Santa Maria della Pace (1854–57)
- Previous post: Bishop of Córdoba (1833–47) Bishop of Málaga (1831–33)

Orders
- Ordination: 21 December 1805
- Consecration: 11 June 1831 by Blas Joaquín Álvarez de Palma
- Created cardinal: 30 September 1850 by Pope Pius IX
- Rank: Cardinal-priest

Personal details
- Born: 17 March 1782 Pinos de Valle
- Died: 11 February 1857 (aged 74) Madrid
- Motto: Pacem et veritatem diligite

Juan José Bonel y Orbe (Pinos del Valle, Granada, 17 March 1782 — Madrid, 11 February 1857) was a Spanish Catholic ecclesiastic, bishop, archbishop, and cardinal in various dioceses.

== Career ==
=== Education ===
Born in the town of Pinos del Valle, Spain, in 1796 he went to Granada to study, where he took a law scholarship at the Royal College of San Bartolomé and Santiago, graduating at the age of twenty-two. He received his doctorate in Civil Law and Canon Law from the University of Granada, eventually becoming a professor of the latter subject.

=== Priest ===
On 21 December 1805, he was ordained a priest and assigned to the parish of San Pedro y San Pablo in Granada, where he remained until 1816 when he was appointed doctoral canon of Málaga and general vicar of the same diocese in 1827.

=== Bishop ===
In 1830, despite being designated as the new bishop of Ibiza, he ended up taking the same position in Málaga due to the death of the bishop of the Málaga diocese, assuming the post on 12 October 1831.

On 7 March 1834, he took possession of the bishopric of Córdoba.

=== Archbishop ===
Four years later, he was elected archbishop of Granada by the government of the Duke of Frías, but he was not confirmed by the Pope, so he continued as bishop of Córdoba until 1847 when he was appointed and confirmed as archbishop of Toledo.

=== Cardinal ===
In the Consistory of 1850, he was elevated to cardinal priest of Santa Maria della Pace by Pope Pius IX.

=== Senator ===
He was a senator for the Province of Almería (1837–1838) and Province of Granada (1840).

=== Other positions ===
In 1839, he was elected Patriarch of the West Indies and military vicar general for a period of eight years, positions he held concurrently with his pontificate in Córdoba.

=== Miscellaneous ===
He was the uncle of poet José de Espronceda and one of the founders of the Royal Economic Society of Friends of the Country.

== Death ==
With his health greatly deteriorated, he died in Madrid and his remains were buried in the Toledo Cathedral.

== See also ==
- Archdiocese of Toledo
