= Vincenzo Santucci =

Italian Catholic cardinal

His Eminence Vincenzo Santucci
- Cardinal-Deacon of Santa Maria ad Martyres
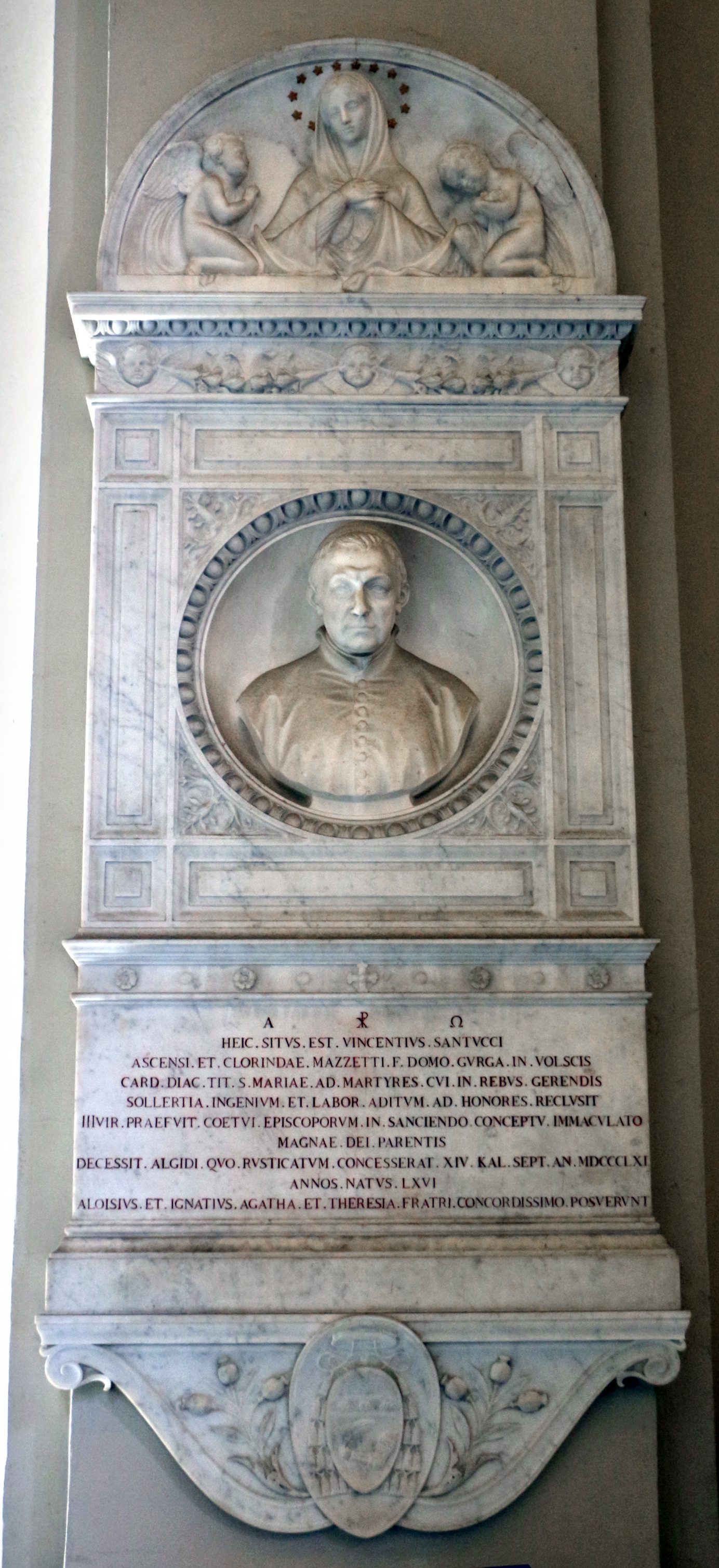
- Tomb in the Lateran Basilica.
- Church: Roman Catholic Church
- Appointed: 23 June 1854
- Term ended: 19 August 1861
- Predecessor: Adriano Fieschi
- Successor: Roberto Giovanni Roberti
- Previous posts: Substitute for General Affairs (1844-50); Secretary of the Congregation for Extraordinary Ecclesial Affairs (1850-53); Cardinal-Deacon of Santi Vito, Modesto e Crescenzia (1853-54)

Orders
- Created cardinal: 7 March 1853 by Pope Pius IX
- Rank: Cardinal-Deacon

Personal details
- Born: Vincenzo Santucci; 18 February 1796 Gorga, Papal States
- Died: 19 August 1861 (aged 65) Rocca di Papa, Papal States
- Buried: Basilica of Saint John Lateran
- Parents: Ascenso Santucci; Clorinda Mazzetti

Vincenzo Santucci, also Vincenso Santucci (18 February 1796 - 19 August 1861) was an Italian cardinal, who spent his life serving in the Roman Curia.

== Life ==
He was born the son of Ascenso Santucci and Clorinda Mazzetti in Gorga in the region of Lazio, then part of the Papal States, now in the Province of Rome.

As a young man, Santucci completed his higher education at the Pamphilio College, after which he was ordained as a Catholic priest at an unknown date. In 1832 he began a career in the papal diplomatic corps, serving as secretary to Cardinal Placido Zurla, O.S.B. Cam., in the Vatican Secretariat of State.

Santucci was named a Cardinal Deacon by Pope Pius IX in the consistory of 7 March 1853 and was given as his titular church that of Santi Vito, Modesto e Crescenzio from 1853 to 1854, when he was granted a change to holding the Basilica of Santa Maria ad Martyres, better known as the Pantheon. In November 1856 he was named the Prefect of the Sacred Congregation of Studies, now the Congregation for Catholic Education, a post which he held until his death.

Santucci died in Rome at the age of 65 and, at his request, was buried in the Archbasilica of St. John Lateran.
