= Bartolomeo d'Avanzo =

Italian Catholic Cardinal

His Eminence Bartolomeo d'Avanzo
- Bishop of Calvi
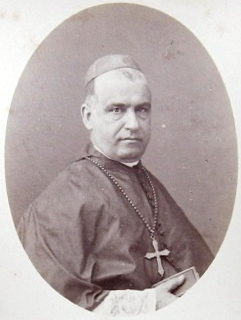
- The-then bishop pictured in 1869.
- Church: Roman Catholic Church
- Diocese: Calvi
- See: Calvi
- Appointed: 13 July 1860
- Term ended: 20 October 1884
- Predecessor: Nicola Sterlini
- Successor: Alfonso Maria Giordano
- Other post: Cardinal-Priest of Santa Susanna (1876–84)
- Previous post: Bishop of Castellaneta (1851–60)

Orders
- Ordination: 20 September 1834 by Gennaro Pasca
- Consecration: 28 March 1852 by Costantino Patrizi Naro
- Created cardinal: 3 April 1876 by Pope Pius IX
- Rank: Cardinal-Priest

Personal details
- Born: Bartolomeo d'Avanzo; 3 July 1811 Avella, Kingdom of Naples
- Died: 20 October 1884 (aged 73) Avella, Kingdom of Italy
- Parents: Bartolomeo d'Avanzo; Caterina Buvelli
- Education: Royal University of Naples

Bartolomeo D’Avanzo (3 July 1811 – 20 October 1884) was an Italian Catholic Cardinal of the 19th century.

== Early life ==
D'Avanzo was born 3 July 1811 in Avella. He was ordained as a priest on 20 September 1834 and was placed in the service of the Diocese of Nola where he remained until 1851 under Bishop Gennaro Pasca.

== Assassination attempt ==
In 1851 he was ordained Bishop of Castellaneta and served the diocese for 9 years until, in 1860, anticlericalists tried to assassinate him by firing four bullets into his carriage. The first bullet struck the inside of the carriage, the second struck him in the right wrist and the third under his left arm. The fourth bullet, which would likely have been fatal, hit D'Avanzo's pectoral cross and he survived the attempt. Fearing further attack he transferred to the Diocese of Teano-Calvi where he served for a further 16 years. He attended the First Vatican Council (1869–1870).

== Cardinalate ==
In 1876 he was elevated to Cardinal by Pope Pius IX and was appointed Cardinal-Priest of Santa Susanna. He participated in the Papal Conclave of 1878 which elected Pope Leo XIII. Throughout his career he was a strong advocate against Freemasonry and led a number of Church campaigns against the society.

He died on 10 October 1884 in Avella and was buried in the D’Avanzo family tomb.

Catholic Church titles
Preceded by Pietro Lepore	Bishop of Castellaneta; 1851–1860	Succeeded by Mariano Positano
Preceded by Nicola Sterlini	Bishop of Teano-Calvi; 1860–1884	Succeeded by Alfonso Maria Giordano
Preceded by Alessandro Barnabò	Cardinal-Priest of Santa Susanna; 1876–1884	Succeeded by Francis Patrick Moran
