= Pedro Paulo de Figueiredo da Cunha e Melo =

His Eminence Pedro Paulo de Figueiredo da Cunha e Melo
- Cardinal, Archbishop of Braga, Primate of Portugal
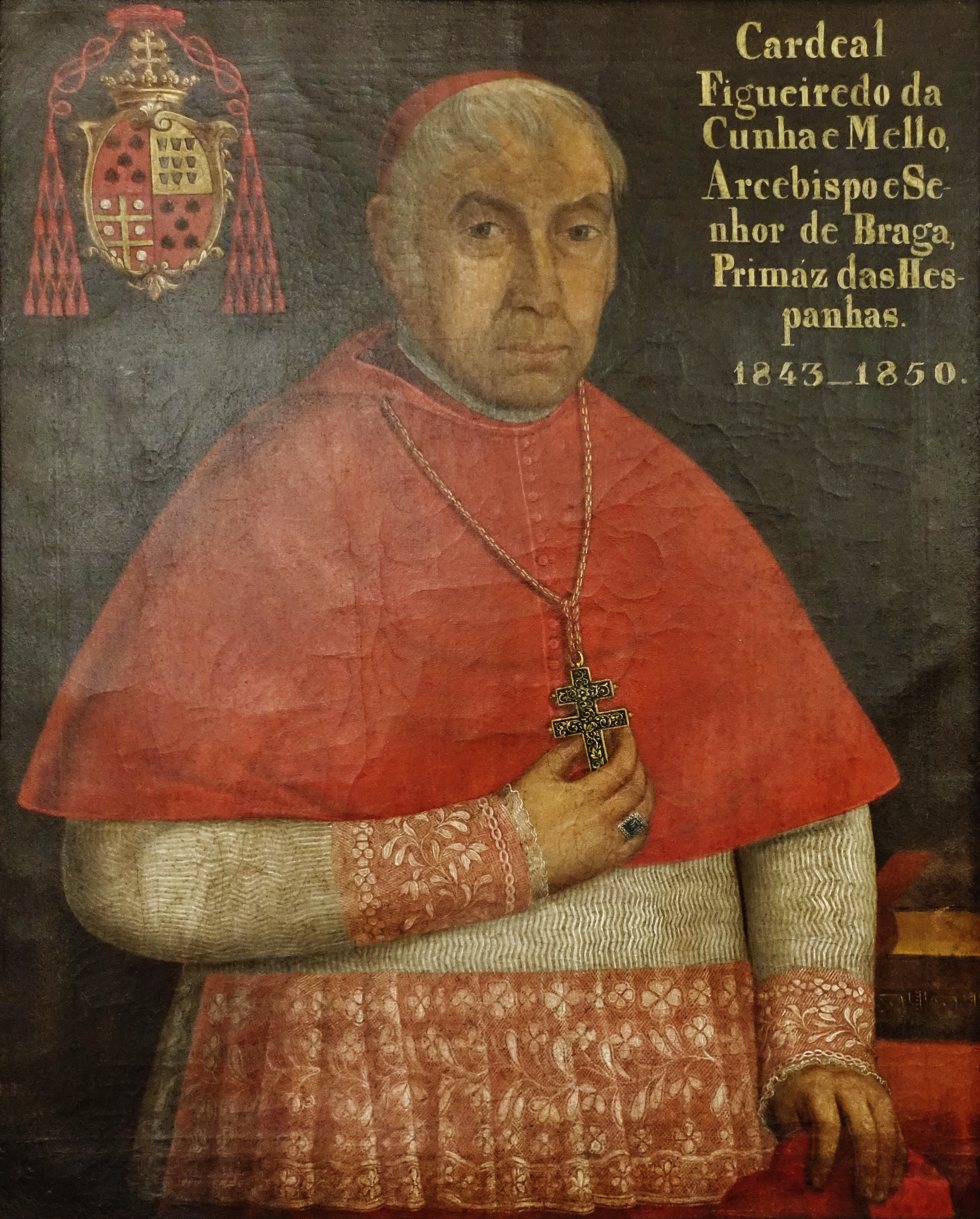
- Church: Roman Catholic
- Archdiocese: Braga
- Appointed: 3 April 1843

Orders
- Consecration: 10 September 1843 by Jerónimo do Barco
- Created cardinal: 30 September 1850 by Pope Pius IX
- Rank: Archbishop

Personal details
- Born: 18 June 1770 Taveiro, Coimbra, Portugal
- Died: 31 December 1855 (aged 85) Braga, Portugal
- Education: University of Coimbra

D. Pedro Paulo de Figueiredo da Cunha e Melo (18 June 1770 – 31 December 1855) was an important Portuguese prelate of the nineteenth century who was also, at one point, elected Member of Parliament for Beira. He was created a Cardinal by Pope Pius IX in 1850, after which he was better known as Cardinal Figueiredo (Cardeal Figueiredo).

== Biography ==
Pedro Paulo de Figueiredo da Cunha e Melo studied in the University of Coimbra, where he acquired a doctorate in utroque iuris. He was Primarius cathedraticus, teaching law at the University.

In the 1826 general election, he was elected Member of Parliament for the province of Beira.

At a time he was only a subdeacon, Figueiredo da Cunha e Melo was named Archbishop of Braga by the Portuguese Government, and the choice was confirmed by Pope Gregory XVI on 3 April 1843, and was consecrated on 10 September, by the bishop of Santiago do Cabo Verde, Jerónimo do Barco.

He was created cardinal priest in the consistory of 30 September 1850, but died before receiving the red hat and title.

He died on 31 December 1855 at the age of 85.
