= Edoardo Borromeo =

Italian Cardinal

His Eminence Edoardo Borromeo
- President of the Congregation for the Reverend Basilica of Saint Peter
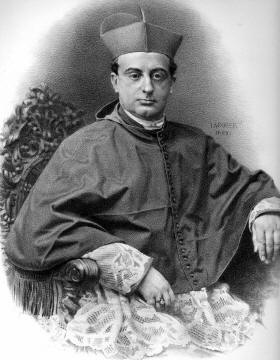
- Church: Roman Catholic Church
- Appointed: 10 July 1872
- Term ended: 30 November 1881
- Predecessor: Mario Mattei
- Successor: Edward Henry Howard
- Other posts: Archpriest of Saint Peter's Basilica (1872–81); Cardinal-Priest of Santa Prassede (1878–81)
- Previous posts: Cardinal-Deacon of Santi Vito, Modesto e Crescenzia (1868–78); Prefect of the Prefecture of the Holy Apostolic Palaces (1869–72); Titular Archbishop of Adana (1878); Camerlengo of the College of Cardinals (1879–80)

Orders
- Ordination: December 1846 by Pope Pius IX
- Consecration: 19 May 1878 by Pope Leo XIII
- Created cardinal: 13 March 1868 by Pope Pius IX
- Rank: Cardinal-Deacon (1868–78); Cardinal-Priest (1878–81)

Personal details
- Born: Edoardo Lodovico Carlo Renato Giovanni Benedetto Borromeo; 3 August 1822 Milan, Kingdom of Lombardy–Venetia
- Died: 30 November 1881 (aged 59) Rome, Kingdom of Italy
- Buried: Campo Verano
- Parents: Vitaliano Borromeo; Maria d'Adda
- Education: Collegio Romano; Pontifical Academy of Ecclesiastical Nobles

Edoardo Borromeo (3 August 1822 – 30 November 1881) was an Italian Cardinal of the Roman Catholic Church. He was Maestro di Camera to Pius IX and was Cardinal-Deacon of Santi Vito, Modesto e Crescenzio from 1868 to 1878. He was the seventh cardinal to be selected from the Borromeo family.
