= Alessandro Barnabò =

Italian Catholic Cardinal (1801-1874)

His Eminence Alessandro Barnabó
- Prefect of the Congregation for Propagation of the Faith
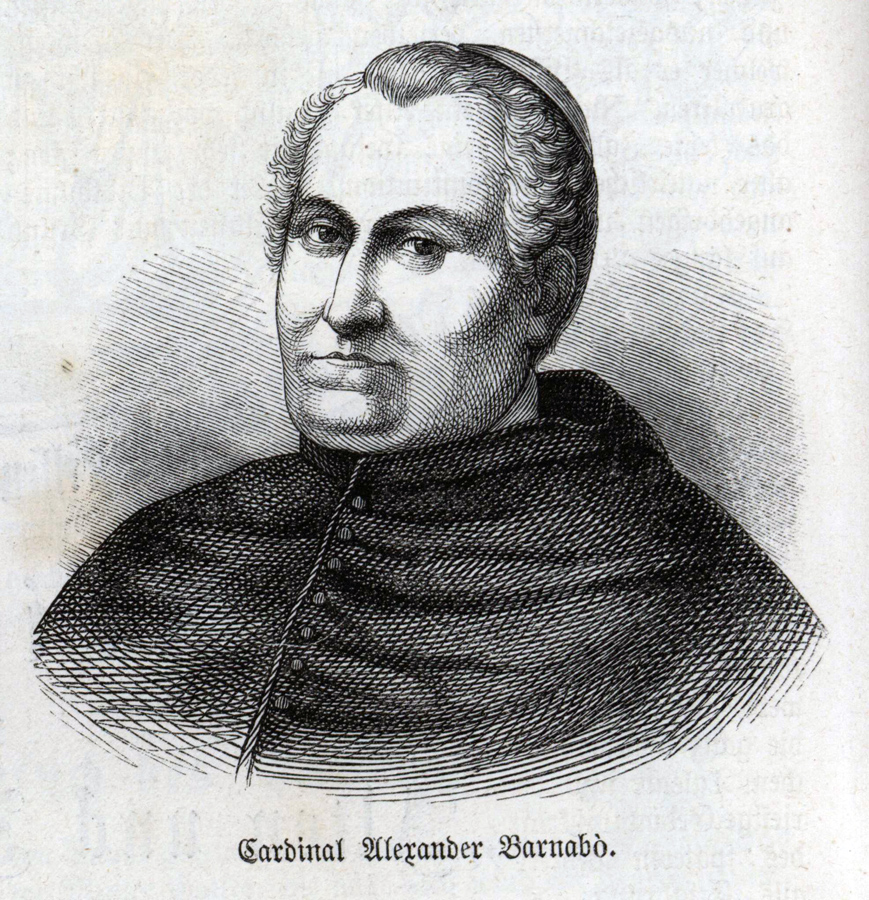
- Church: Roman Catholic Church
- Appointed: 20 June 1856
- Term ended: 24 February 1874
- Predecessor: Giacomo Filippo Fransoni
- Successor: Alessandro Franchi
- Other post: Cardinal-Priest of Santa Susanna (1856–74)
- Previous post: Camerlengo of the College of Cardinals (1868–69)

Orders
- Ordination: March 1833
- Created cardinal: 16 June 1856 by Pope Pius IX
- Rank: Cardinal-Priest

Personal details
- Born: Alessandro Barnabò; 2 March 1801 Foligno, Papal States
- Died: 24 February 1874 (aged 72) Rome, Papal States
- Education: La Sapienza University

Alessandro Barnabò (2 March 1801 – 24 February 1874) was an Italian Catholic Cardinal and Prefect of the Congregation Propaganda Fide.

== Early life ==
Barnabò was born on 2 March 1801 in Foligno.

At the age of 10, he was sent by the French administration in Italy to the Prytanée National Militaire in La Flèche, but he returned to Italy in 1814 to study for the priesthood.

He joined the priesthood and was ordained in March 1833. Between his ordination and 1856 he held a number of official positions including Privy chamberlain supernumerary, Consultor to the Propaganda Fide, Keeper of the Seals of the Apostolic Penitentiary and served as a domestic prelate to the Pope.

== Cardinalate ==
Barnabò was elevated to cardinal on 16 June 1856 and was appointed Cardinal Priest of Santa Susanna, a position he held until his death.

Between 1856 and 1874, Barnabò served as the Prefect of the Congregation Propaganda Fide. Some records suggest Barnabò's administered the Congregation with almost totalitarian gusto and "controlled the missions like an empire" and ran the Congregation itself "like a dictator". As Prefect, Barnabò was responsible for arranging a meeting between Pope Pius IX and Isaac Hecker. Hecker had been expelled from his Redemptorist order but Barnabò recognised his valuable missionary work and helped him appeal to the Pope who overturned the expulsion. For a year (1868–1869), as was customary for the office, Barnabò was appointed Camerlengo of the Sacred College of Cardinals. He succeeded friend and fellow papal power-broker, Cardinal Karl-August von Reisach.

He participated in the First Vatican Council between 1869 and 1870.

In 1873, Mary MacKillop travelled to Rome and met, among others, Barnabò who encouraged her "warmly" and took great interest in her travels.

Barnabò died on 24 February 1874.

Catholic Church titles
Preceded by Ignazio Giovanni Cadolini	Cardinal Priest of Santa Suzanna; 1856–1874	Succeeded by Bartolomeo D’Avanzo
Preceded by Giacomo Filippo Fransoni	Prefect of the Congregation Propaganda Fide; 1856–1874	Succeeded by Alessandro Franchi
Preceded by Karl-August von Reisach	Camerlengo of the Sacred College of Cardinals; 1868–1869	Succeeded by Giuseppe Milesi Pironi Ferretti
