= Monastery of the Viperesche =

Monastery in Rome, Italy

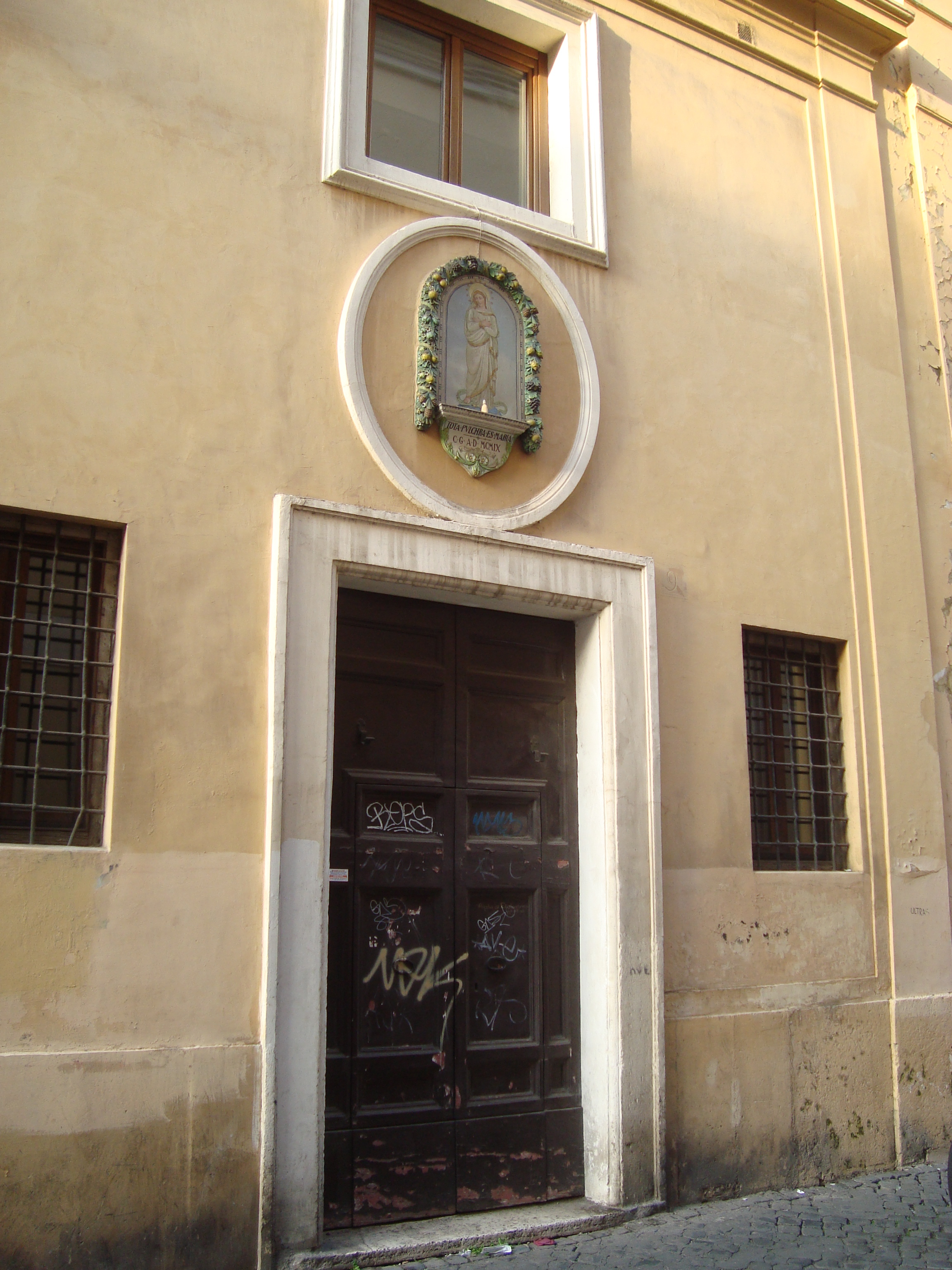
View of oratory and facade

The Monastery of the Viperesche (Italian: Monastero delle Viperesche) is a former monastic building, still belonging to the Roman Catholic church, located on Via di San Vito, near the Arch of Gallienus, in the rione Esquilino, of Rome, Italy. The monastery complex, which includes the Oratory of Holy Mary of the Immaculate Conception (Italian: Oratorio di Santa Maria Immacolata della Concezione) now functions as a hostel. The monastery was in the past referred to as the Conservatory of the Holiest Conception or of the Viperesche.

== History ==
The conservatory was founded in 1668 by the endowment of a wealthy Roman aristocrat, Livia Vipereschi, who endowed the conservatory with the task of housing and providing a Christian upbringing to girls and young women. Her endowment reached an income of 300 scudi per year. Further contributions were added by Maria Camilla Orsini (Principessa Borghese) and Lucrezia Rospigliosi. Livia had dedicated herself to celibate meditative prayer after her groom, Valerio de’principi Massimo, died the night before his wedding.

Soon after opening, the institution was under administration by Carmelite nuns. These nuns allowed the women to either marry with a provided dowry, or enter the order. In later years, the institution also served as a refuge for women escaping a marriage commitment or well-to-do women with mental disturbances.

The structure underwent a number of refurbishments including under Pope Pius VII. During the 19th and 20th centuries it was administered by Maestre Pie Venerini, and most recently by the Order of the Pie Discepole del Redentore, who sponsor a hostel for international students.

== Bibliography ==
- Mariano Armellini, Le chiese di Roma dal secolo IV al XIX, Roma 1891, p. 812
- Claudio Rendina, Le Chiese di Roma, Newton & Compton Editori, Milano 2000, pp. 226–227.
