= Cirilo de Alameda y Brea =

Catholic cardinal

His Eminence Cirilo de Alameda y Brea O.F.M. Obs.
- Archbishop of Toledo
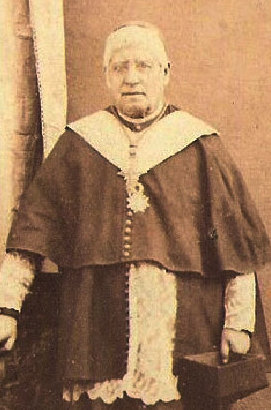
- The cardinal in Madrid circa 1870.
- Church: Roman Catholic Church
- Archdiocese: Toledo
- See: Toledo
- Appointed: 3 August 1857
- Term ended: 30 June 1872
- Predecessor: Juan José Bonel y Orbe
- Successor: Juan de la Cruz Ignacio Moreno y Maisonave
- Previous posts: Minister-General for the Order of Friars Minor (1817-23); Archbishop of Santiago de Cuba (1831-49); Archbishop of Burgos (1849-57)

Orders
- Consecration: 12 March 1832 by Francisco Javier de Cienfuegos y Jovellanos
- Rank: Cardinal-Priest

Personal details
- Born: Cirilo de Alameda y Brea; 9 July 1781 Torrejón de Velasco, Kingdom of Spain
- Died: 30 June 1872 (aged 90) Toledo, Spanish Kingdom
- Buried: Toledo Cathedral
- Parents: Pedro Alameda Martín; María Brea Calderón
- Education: University of Zaragoza

Cirilo de Alameda y Brea O.F.M. Obs. (9 July 1781, in Torrejón de Velasco, Spain – 30 June 1872, in Toledo) was a cardinal of the Catholic Church. He was archbishop of Toledo 1857–1867.

== Life ==
He had worked as a priest in Uruguay and in Brazil. He was minister general of his order from 1817 until 1823.

In 1831, he was elected archbishop of Santiago de Cuba. He was consecrated a bishop by cardinal Francisco Javier de Cienfuegos y Jovellanos. In the same year, he was counselor of Spain. In 1849, he was appointed archbishop of Burgos. He was appointed archbishop of Toledo eight years later. He was made cardinal in 1858 by Pope Pius IX and died 1872 at the age of 90 years. At the time of his death, he was the oldest living cardinal.

== See also ==
- Catholic Church in Spain

== External links and additional sources ==
- Cheney, David M. "Archdiocese of Santiago de Cuba". Catholic-Hierarchy.org. (for Chronology of Bishops) ^{[self-published]}
- Chow, Gabriel. "Metropolitan Archdiocese of Santiago". GCatholic.org. (for Chronology of Bishops) ^{[self-published]}
