= Matarrese =

Matarrese is an Italian surname. Notable people with the surname include:

- Antonio Matarrese (born 1940), Italian football manager
- Giuseppe Matarrese (1934–2020), Italian Roman Catholic bishop
