= Giovanni Tommaso Maria Marelli =

Italian Roman Catholic prelate

Most Reverend Giovanni Tommaso Maria Marelli
- Archbishop (Personal Title) of Imola
- Church: Catholic Church
- Diocese: Diocese of Imola
- In office: 1739–1752
- Predecessor: Giuseppe Accoramboni
- Successor: Giovanni Carlo Bandi

Orders
- Ordination: 21 Dec 1697
- Consecration: 21 Dec 1716 by Sebastiano Antonio Tanara

Personal details
- Born: 2 Jul 1673 Robassomero, Italy
- Died: 9 Feb 1752 (age 78)

Giovanni Tommaso Maria Marelli, C.O. (1673–1752) was a Roman Catholic prelate who served as Archbishop (Personal Title) of Imola (1739–1752) and Archbishop of Urbino (1716–1739).

== Biography ==
Giovanni Tommaso Maria Marelli was born in Robassomero, Italy on 2 Jul 1673 and ordained a priest in the Oratory of Saint Philip Neri on 21 Dec 1697. On 7 Dec 1716, he was appointed during the papacy of Pope Clement XI as Archbishop of Urbino. On 21 Dec 1716, he was consecrated bishop by Sebastiano Antonio Tanara, Cardinal-Bishop of Frascati, with Filippo Carlo Spada, Bishop of Pesaro, and Antonio Polcenigo, Bishop of Feltre, serving as co-consecrators. On 23 Feb 1739, he was appointed during the papacy of Pope Clement XII as Archbishop (Personal Title) of Imola. He served as Archbishop of Imola until his death on 9 Feb 1752.

While bishop, he was the principal co-consecrator of Bartolomeo Fargna, Titular Bishop of Emmaüs (1729).

== External links and additional sources ==
- Cheney, David M. "Diocese of Imola". Catholic-Hierarchy.org. (for Chronology of Bishops) ^{[self-published]}
- Chow, Gabriel. "Diocese of Imola (Italy)". GCatholic.org. (for Chronology of Bishops) ^{[self-published]}

Catholic Church titles
Preceded by Antonio Francesco Sanvitale	Archbishop of Urbino; 1716–1739	Succeeded by Antonio Guglielmi
Preceded by Giuseppe Accoramboni	Archbishop (Personal Title) of Imola; 1739–1752	Succeeded by Giovanni Carlo Bandi
