= Francesco Onofrio Odierna =

Italian Roman Catholic prelate

Most Reverend Francesco Onofrio Odierna
- Titular Bishop of Berytus
- Church: Catholic Church
- In office: 1727–1736
- Previous post: Bishop of Bitetto (1684–1717)

Orders
- Ordination: 27 January 1669

Personal details
- Born: 13 May 1644 Naples, Kingdom of Naples
- Died: 1736 (aged 91–92) Naples, Kingdom of Naples

Francesco Onofrio Odierna (sometimes Hodierna; 13 May 1644 – 1736) was an Italian Roman Catholic prelate who served as Titular Bishop of Berytus (1727), Bishop of Valva e Sulmona (1717–1727) and Bishop of Bitetto (1684–1717).

== Biography ==
Francesco Onofrio Odierna was born in Naples in 1644. His father was the jurist Giovan Battista Odierna. He was ordained a deacon on 20 January 1669 and ordained a priest on 27 January 1669. On 24 April 1684, he was appointed during the papacy of Pope Innocent XI as Bishop of Bitetto. On 4 January 1717, he was appointed during the papacy of Pope Clement XI as Bishop of Valva e Sulmona. He served as Bishop of Valva e Sulmona until his resignation on 6 March 1727. On 17 March 1727, he was appointed during the papacy of Pope Benedict XIII as Titular Bishop of Berytus. He died in 1736.

== Episcopal succession ==
While bishop, he was the principal co-consecrator of:

- Giovanni Battista de Belli, Bishop of Telese o Cerreto Sannita (1684);
- Fulvio Crivelli (Cribelli), Bishop of Tricarico (1684);
- Antonio Polcenigo, Bishop of Feltre (1684);
- Domenico Minio, Bishop of Caorle (1684);
- Baldassare de Benavente, Bishop of Potenza (1686); and
- Filippo Massarenghi, Bishop of Bitonto (1686).

== External links and additional sources ==
- Chiaverini, Antonino (1980). La diocesi di Valva e Sulmona. Vol. 8. Sulmona: Accademia Cateriniana di Cultura. pp. 97–129.
- Currò, Carmelo (2020) [2005]. "Da Lontano. Storia della famiglia Odierna". In Franco, Alfredo; De Martino, Francesco; Odierna, Agostino (eds.). Studi Storici Sarnesi. L'affermazione dei "civili": il caso degli Hodierna (in Italian). Torre del Greco: ESA. p. 23. ISBN 9788899472474.
- Cheney, David M. "Diocese of Sulmona-Valva". Catholic-Hierarchy.org. (for Chronology of Bishops) ^{[self-published]}
- Chow, Gabriel. "Diocese of Sulmona-Valva". GCatholic.org. (for Chronology of Bishops) ^{[self-published]}

Catholic Church titles
Preceded by Giacomo Santoro	Bishop of Bitetto; 1684–1717	Succeeded by Gioacchino Francesco Caprini
Preceded by Bonaventura Martinelli	Bishop of Valva e Sulmona; 1717–1727	Succeeded by Matteo Odierna
