= Lazarus Buonamici =

Italian Renaissance humanist

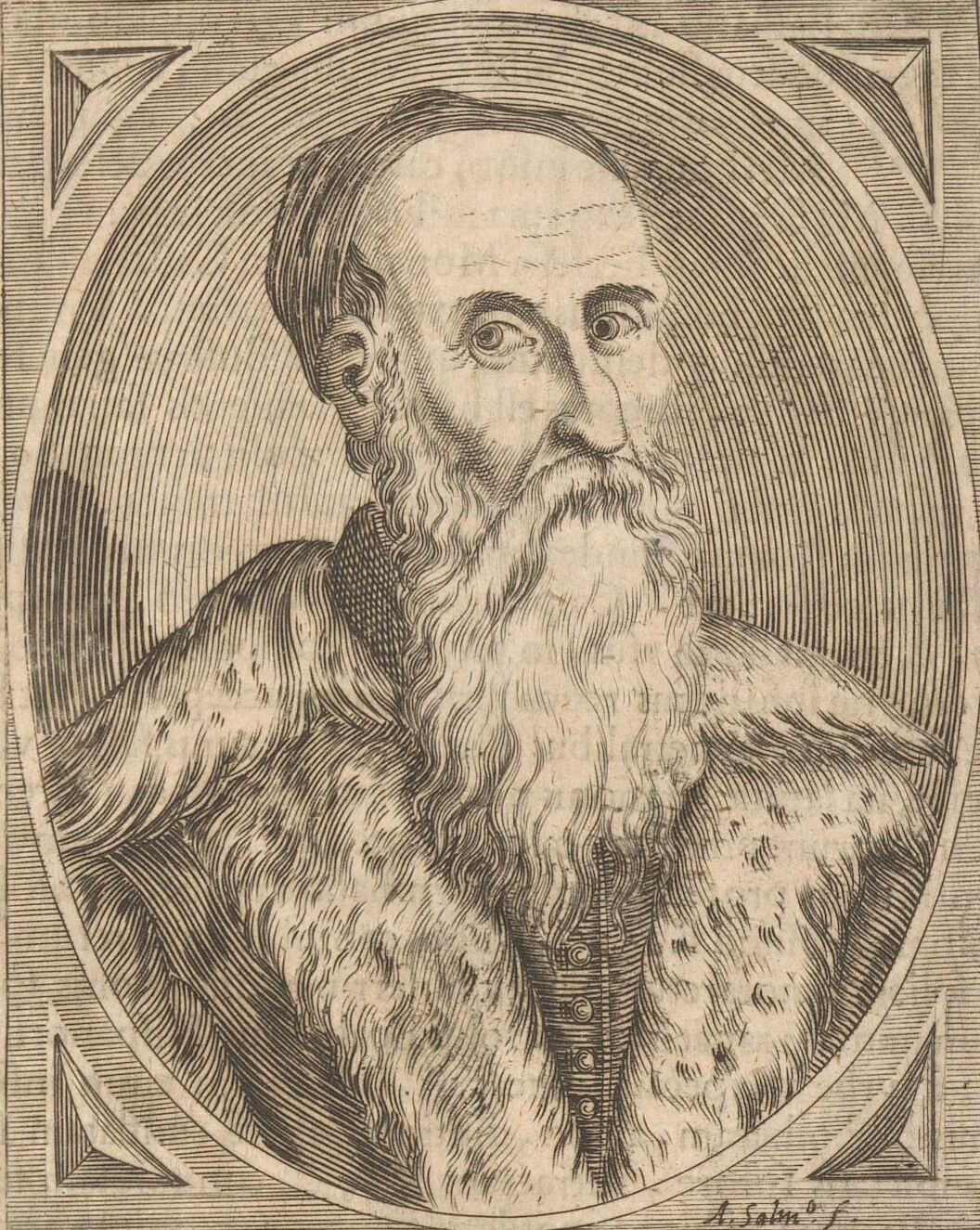
Lazarus Buonamici

Lazarus (or Lázaro) Buonamici (1479–1552) was an Italian Renaissance humanist.

== Biography ==
Buonamici was born in Bassano, and studied at the University of Padua. He tutored for the Campeggi family for a time, and later was professor of Belles Lettres at the Sapienza University of Rome. He fled Rome during the sack of 1527, escaping to Padua but losing all his property. He became a professor at Padua, where his lectures acquired for him a great reputation, though he did not commit the results of his scholarship to print, and only a few letters and poems of his survive, published posthumously in 1572.
