= Marino Grimani =

Marino Grimani may refer to:

- Marino Grimani (cardinal) (died 1546), bishop from 1508, cardinal from 1527
- Marino Grimani (doge) (1532–1605), reigned 1595–1605
