= Preci =

- Comune
- Comune di Preci
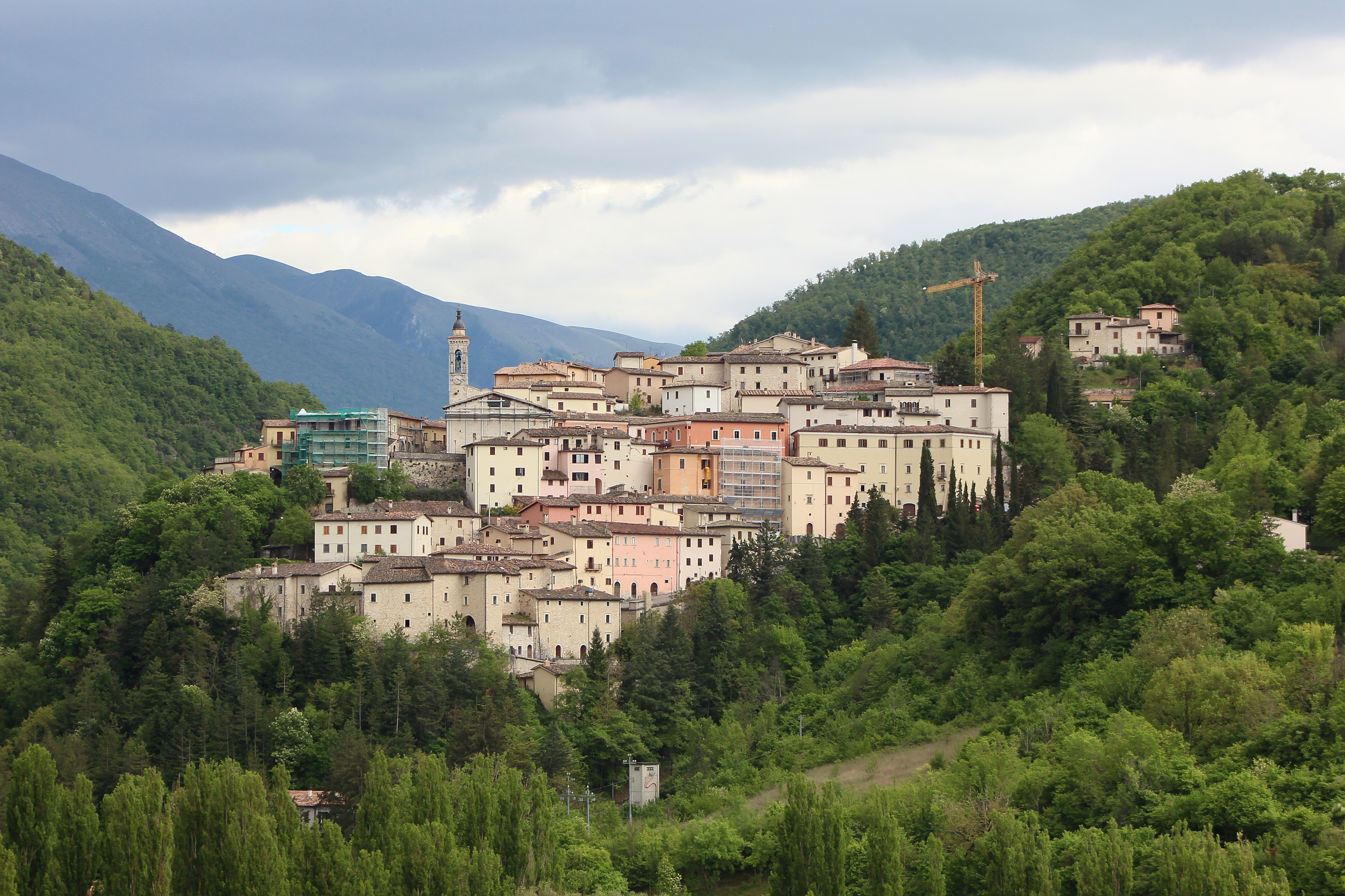
- View of Preci

- Coat of arms

- Location within Italy Location within Umbria
- Coordinates: 42.879009°N 13.038986°E
- Country: Italy
- Region: Umbria
- Province: Perugia (PG)

Government
  - Mayor: Massimo Messi since 27-5-2019 (Uniti per Preci)

Area
  - Total: 82.02 km^{2} (31.67 sq mi)
- Elevation: 596 m (1,955 ft)

Population (1 January 2026)
  - Total: 678
  - Density: 8.27/km^{2} (21.4/sq mi)
- Demonym: Preciani
- Time zone: UTC+1 (CET)
  - Summer (DST): UTC+2 (CEST)
- Postal code: 06047
- Dialing code: 0743
- Patron saint: Madonna della Pietà
- Saint day: June 7
- Website: https://www.comune.preci.pg.it/homepage.html

Preci is a comune (municipality) in the Province of Perugia in the Italian region Umbria, located about 60 km southeast of Perugia. It is one of I Borghi più belli d'Italia ("The most beautiful villages of Italy").

== History ==
Preci originated as an ancient Sabine settlement. In the early Middle Ages it was subject first to the Duchy of Spoleto and later to the Church under Pope Innocent III.

In 1232–33, the settlement is recorded as a castrum, and during that period it paid the fodrum, a feudal levy, to Duke Conrad as well as to the papal rector. By the mid-13th century Preci had submitted to the Commune of Norcia, a subjection that was formally recognized in 1276 by the papal legate Capocci.

Preci was almost entirely destroyed by an earthquake in 1328.

In 1385, it appears in the registers of Norcia under the name castrum Precis.

In 1527, Preci was almost entirely destroyed during military actions led by Cardinal Armellini, papal legate of the Marches; it was subsequently rebuilt, an undertaking traditionally attributed to Cristoforo Carocci.

In 1569, Norcia became the seat of the Prefecture of the Mountain, and the surrounding territory, including Preci, was reorganized into districts known as guaite and sindicati. An apostolic report of 1587 lists Preci among the castles and villages subject to Norcia. During the early modern period, the community oversaw the administration of the sanctuary of Madonna della Peschiera.

In 1703, the castle of Abeto was destroyed by an earthquake.

Between 1798 and 1799, during the Roman Republic, Preci was included in the Department of Spoleto within the Canton of Visso and was temporarily separated from Norcia. After 1799 it returned to papal control within the Apostolic Delegation of Spoleto.

In 1803, Preci was a feudal domain of Baron Crispolti. By 1818, it had passed to Baron Fabrizio degli Arcipreti della Penna.

Under Napoleonic rule from 1809 to 1814, Preci was governed as a mairie in the Department of Trasimeno, Canton of Norcia. With the Restoration in 1814 it returned to the Papal States. In 1817 it was established as an autonomous municipality.

In 1859, the municipality had a population of 2,847 inhabitants. Of these, 2,435 resided in the main settlement and 412 in the countryside.

In recent decades, Preci suffered extensive damage from earthquakes. In 1997 it was hit by the Umbria and Marche earthquakes. The old center of Preci was later ravaged by the October 2016 Central Italy Earthquakes.

Since 2019, part of the historic center has been reopened to visitors.

== Geography ==
Preci is situated in mountainous terrain within the Castoriana valley and is enclosed by walls. The historic borgo is crossed by the Campiano river. The surrounding territory is largely mountainous.

The climate was described as rather cold, with frequent snow and prevailing north winds. Nearby natural features include the Carbonara stream to the west of the town and the main river at a distance of about 1/6 mile (0.27 km). The springs at the foot of the hill of Santa Maria della Peschiera were noted for their waters.

Preci borders the following municipalities: Castelsantangelo sul Nera, Cerreto di Spoleto, Norcia, Visso.

=== Subdivisions ===
The municipality includes the localities of Abeto, Casali Belforte, Castelvecchio, Collazzoni, Collescille, Corone, Fiano, Montaglioni, Montebufo, Piedivalle, Poggio di Croce, Preci, Roccanolfi, Sacco Vescio, Todiano.

In 2021, 98 people lived in rural dispersed dwellings not assigned to any named locality. At the time, most of the population lived in Preci proper (279), and Corone (83).

== Religion and culture ==
=== Abbey of Sant'Eutizio ===
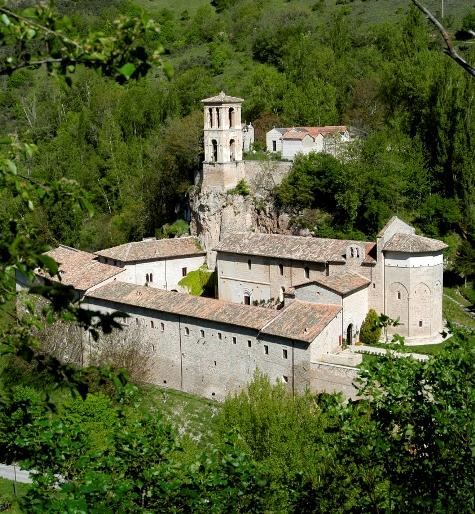
The Abbey of Sant'Eutizio in 2008

The abbey of Sant'Eutizio stands on a high cliff overlooking the Castoriana valley. Its foundation is traced to the 5th century, when the Syrian hermit Saint Spes established an oratory. He was succeeded by Saint Eutychius, who built the first church. In the 8th century Benedictine monks replaced the Syrian hermits and constructed a monastery, enlarging the original oratory.

The church façade has a gabled form with a Romanesque portal whose lunette bears the date 1190, marking the beginning of construction. It also features a large rose window framed by two orders of small columns and a panel with the symbols of the four Evangelists. The bell tower was built in the 17th century by the architect Crescenzi. The interior consists of a single nave with a raised presbytery; restoration works carried out in the 1950s aimed to recover the original forms. Fragments of the early fresco decoration remain on the windows.

Behind the high altar, which bears a painted Crucifix by Nicola da Siena, stands a funerary monument to Saint Eutychius attributed to Rocco di Tommaso and dated 1514. The wooden choir of the 16th century comes from the workshop of the Seneca family of Piedivalle. Beneath the presbytery is a crypt with two columns dating to the 14th century.

Around the year 1000, the abbey became a cultural center with a large library and a school of illumination. From the library comes a confession formula dated 1095, among the earliest texts in the Italian vernacular. In 1605 the abbot Giacomo Crescenzi donated part of the library to Saint Philip Neri, who transferred the books to the Biblioteca Vallicelliana in Rome. From the 10th to the 13th century the abbey expanded its possessions and promoted a surgical school.

After the 2016 earthquake, reconstruction of the Abbey began in December 2022 using the original stones. Workers recovered and reassembled the façade and its rose window, putting together about 400 fragments.

=== Other religious buildings ===
Preci contains the notable Collegiate Church of Santa Maria Santissima della Pietà, which has an organ and a significant painting. The churches of San Martino, the town's patron saint, and Santa Maria also possess organs, including one attributed to Callido of Venice. A solemn feast of the Blessed Sacrament was celebrated on the third Sunday of June, and a fair was held on the first Monday of October.

The church of Madonna della Peschiera stands in Borgo Preci, a more recent commercial settlement along the Campiano valley.

The Church of Annunziata in Poggio di Croce houses a 14th-century fresco of the Annunciation by Giovanni del Biondo.

=== Museum of Surgery ===
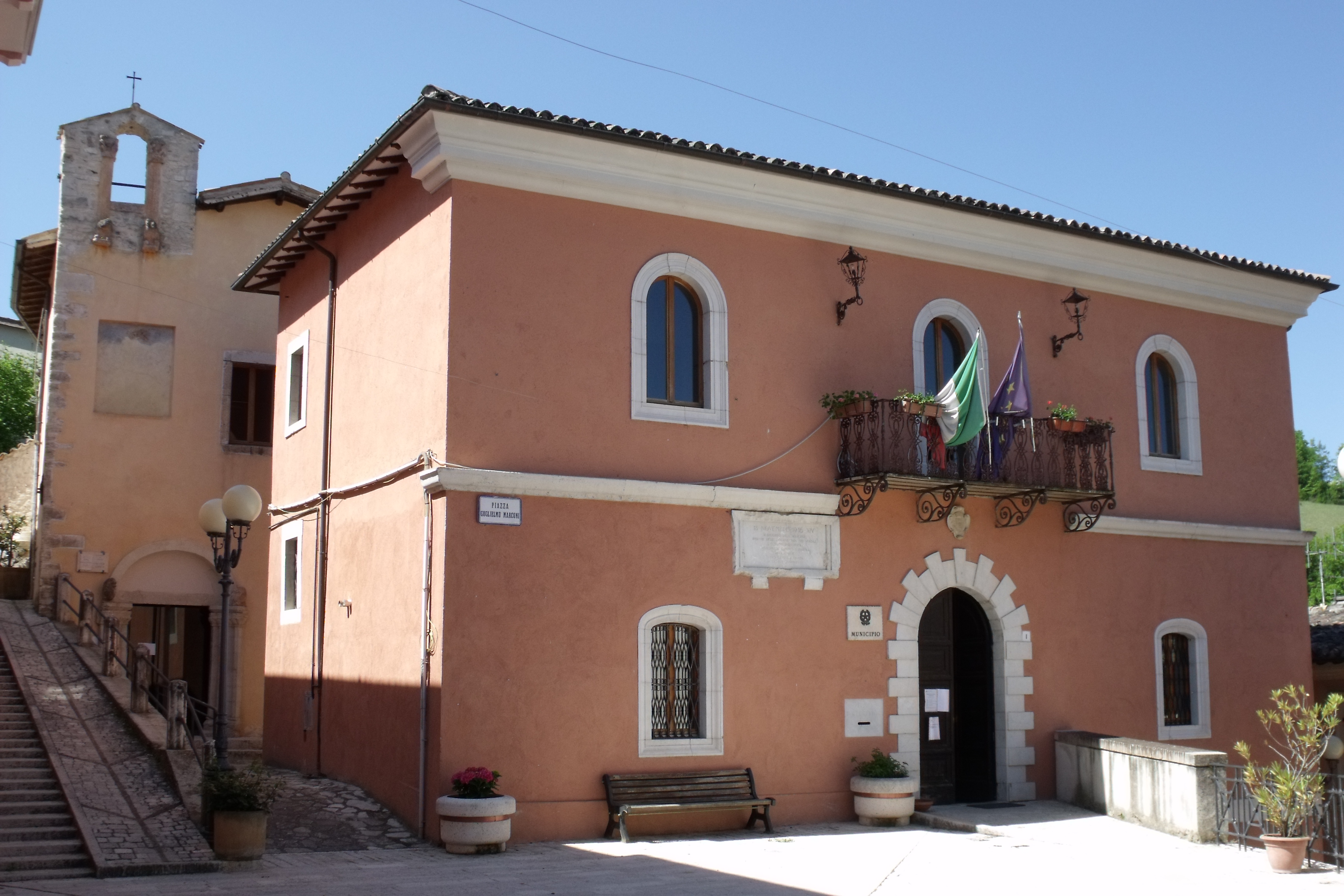
Town hall and former church of Santa Caterina

The former church of Santa Caterina now houses the Museum of Precian Surgery, opened in 2009. The exhibition includes portraits of notable physicians, depictions of patients, and anatomical illustrations. Display cases contain surgical instruments used by surgeons from Preci.

The church of Santa Caterina is among the oldest churches of Preci and dates to the 10th century. Over time it underwent restorations and alterations that largely changed its original appearance. The Romanesque portal, previously walled up, was reopened during restoration works, and the bell gable above it was consolidated.

=== Other cultural heritage ===
The historic settlement of Preci has a compact urban structure and an appearance shaped largely in the 16th century. Numerous palaces were built between the 16th and 18th centuries by families of physicians connected with the local surgical tradition.

In the upper part of the village lies the Scacchi quarter, where houses dating to the 16th century were built by the Scacchi and Mensurati families of physicians. The buildings are characterized by decorated portals and inscriptions with mottos on the architraves.

Other sights include:

- Remains of the 13th-century castle in the frazione of Acquaro
- Pre-historic grotto tombs, in the frazione of Fiano d'Abeto

== Notable people ==
Among the notable families of Preci were the Cesqui, regarded in the 19th century as the wealthiest in Todiano, as well as the Riccolini, Salimbeni, and Sbrinchetti. Members of the Carocci family were noted jurists, and one daughter of the family became Countess Augusta Pila. In 1781 Giuseppe Maria Carocci, a member of the Carocci family of Preci, was admitted to the patriciate of Spoleto, where he founded a commandery of Saints Maurice and Lazarus, and authored the treatise De iure selecta.

The town also produced Cardinal Giuseppe Accoramboni, the bishops Bonaiuti, Bitozzi, and Bacchettoni. An Accoramboni served as councillor to Augustus III of Poland, while a Bonaiuti was a Knight of St Mark in Venice. Salimbeni, a native of Preci, served as vicar general to Robert, King of Sicily.

=== School of medicine and surgery ===
Preci developed a notable medical tradition. Two physicians of the Scacchi family achieved international renown, one serving at the court of Paris and the other at that of Queen Elizabeth I of England. Several members of local families, including the Arcangeli, Mattioli, Cattani, Marini, Benevoli, and Lapi, were regarded as eminent in the healing arts. The Cattani family produced a physician who served the Sultan.

Sigismondo Carocci served at the court of Ferdinand III and, according to tradition, restored the sight of the emperor's mother; in 1648 he was created a noble of the Holy Roman Empire.

The Surgery Museum of Preci is now located next to the town hall.
