= Pietro Marcellino Corradini =

Italian Roman Catholic cardinal

Venerable Pietro Marcellino Corradini
- Cardinal-Bishop of Frascati
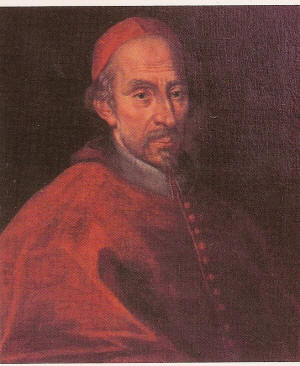
- Cardinal Corradini.
- Church: Catholic Church
- See: Frascati
- Appointed: 15 December 1734
- Term ended: 8 February 1743
- Predecessor: Pietro Ottoboni
- Successor: Giuseppe Accoramboni
- Previous posts: Titular Archbishop of Athenae (1707-1712); Cardinal-Priest of San Giovanni a Porta Latina (1712-1734); Pro-Prefect of the Congregation of the Council (1718); Prefect of the Congregation of the Council (1718-1721); Camerlengo of the Apostolic Chamber (1719-1720); Pro-Datary of the Apostolic Dataria (1721-1730); Cardinal-Priest of Santa Maria in Trastevere (1726-1734)

Orders
- Ordination: 10 June 1702 by Domenico de Zaoli
- Consecration: 27 November 1707 by Fabrizio Paolucci
- Created cardinal: 18 May 1712 (in pectore); 26 September 1712 (name revealed); by Pope Clement XI
- Rank: Cardinal-Priest (1712-1734); Cardinal-Bishop (1734-1743)

Personal details
- Born: Pietro Marcellino Corradini; 2 June 1658 Sezze, Latina, Papal States
- Died: 8 February 1743 (aged 84) Rome, Papal States

Sainthood
- Venerated in: Catholic Church
- Title as Saint: Venerable
- Attributes: Cardinal's attire

Ordination history of Pietro Marcellino Corradini
History
Episcopal consecration
- Principal consecrator: Fabrizio Paolucci
- Co-consecrators: Antonio Francesco Sanvitale & Ulisse Giuseppe Gozzadini
Cardinalate
- Elevated by: Pope Clement XI
Episcopal succession
Bishops consecrated by Pietro Marcellino Corradini as principal consecrator
- Anton Maria Borromeo, C.R.: 3 September 1713
- Conus Luchini dal Verme: 12 March 1719
- Giovanni Crisostomo Verchio, O.S.B.I.: 12 May 1720
- Arcangelo Maria Luc Thomas Ciccarelli, O.P.: 3 May 1731
- Francesco Maria Alberici: 14 April 1732
- Antonio Maria Bacigalupi, Sch. P.: 4 May 1732
- Giuseppe di Marsciano: 2 February 1734
- Cristóbal Almeida: 2 October 1735

Styles of Pietro Marcellino Corradini
- Reference style: His Eminence
- Spoken style: Your Eminance
- Informal style: Cardinal
- See: Frascati (Suburbicarian see)

Pietro Marcellino Corradini (2 June 1658 – 8 February 1743) was an Italian Catholic prelate who served in various departments of the Roman Curia under several popes and founded the Collegine Sisters of the Holy Family as a response to the demand for religious instruction for girls.

In 1993 his cause for sainthood was opened in Palermo and he became titled as a Servant of God. Pope Francis named him as Venerable on 24 April 2021.

== Life ==
Pietro Marcellino Corradini was born to bourgeois parents on 2 June 1658 in Sezze to Torquato Corradini and Porzia Ciammarucone. He was baptized on 3 June and his godmother was Caterina Savelli. He was privately educated by tutors and later sent to Rome, where he was awarded a doctorate in "utroque iure" (both civil and canon law). He also underwent archaeological studies.

Corradini later became auditor to Cardinal Benedetto Pamphilj in 1685 and was later where he held a post in the Roman Curia in which he was later reconfirmed by Pope Clement XI on 7 December 1700 (as is the norm after the elevation of a new pope). In 1699, Pope Innocent XII appointed him a canon of the Basilica of Saint John Lateran despite the fact that he had not as yet been ordained to the priesthood. He was ordained as a priest in Rome on 10 June 1702 and was appointed as a member of the Apostolic Signatura in mid 1706. In the same year, Cardinal Leandro Colloredo appointed him as a canonist and auditor at the Apostolic Penitentiary, and this was confirmed by a papal bull on 19 August 1706.

Corradini was appointed as the Titular Archbishop of Athens on 7 November 1707 and was given the title monsignor on 23 November. His episcopal consecration by Cardinal Fabrizio Paolucci took place on 27 November in the Basilica of Saint John Lateran.

During the years 1705-1711, he was involved in defending the papacy against various sustained acts of political and military interference by Emperor Joseph I. He also successfully opposed the Emperor's attempt to impose a favorite, Hugh Francis von Fürstenberg, as bishop of Hildesheim without Clement XI's approval.

Pope Clement XI chose Corradini as a cardinal in pectore in mid 1712 and published his name on 26 September 1712, on which date his status as a cardinal took effect. He received the red hat and the designation as Cardinal-Priest of San Giovanni a Porta Latina on 21 November that year. The pope also appointed Corradini as the Pro-Prefect of the Congregation of the Council in April 1718 and he then served as its full prefect from 26 November 1718 to 1721. He also held the post of Camerlengo from 1719 until 4 March 1720.

Corradini participated in the papal conclave of 1721 that saw the election of Pope Innocent XIII and also in that of 1724 that led to the election of Pope Benedict XIII. On 11 September 1726, he received authorization from the pope to hold his titular church "in commendam" and simultaneously the appointment of Cardinal-Priest of Santa Maria in Trastevere. He also participated in the conclave of 1730 that saw the election of Pope Clement XII and declined the pope's offer of reconfirmation in his post in the Apostolic Dataria; this meant an end to his work in the completion of treaties with Spain and Austria. In 1717 he established a religious congregation devoted to the religious education of girls, called at the time "Le Convittrici della Sacra Famiglia" ("Hostel keepers of the Holy Family). On 10 April 1734, he resigned as Cardinal-Priest of San Giovanni a Porta Latina and on 15 December that year opted to become Cardinal-Bishop of Frascati. In the conclave of 1740, Cardinal Troiano Acquaviva d'Aragona presented the veto of King Felipe V against the election of Corradini; the conclave concluded in the election of Pope Benedict XIV.

Corradini died in Via Lata, Rome, at 11:45am on 8 February 1743 after a protracted illness. On 10 February, in accordance with his will, his remains were taken to Santa Maria in Trastevere, prompting an outpouring of grief and condolence messages.

=== Legacy ===
At present, Corradini's religious congregation, now known as "Le Suore collegine della Sacra Famiglia" ("College Sisters of the Holy Family) has spread across the world and now operates in Albania, the United Kingdom, Mexico, Romania, Tanzania and in Kenya.

== Beatification process ==
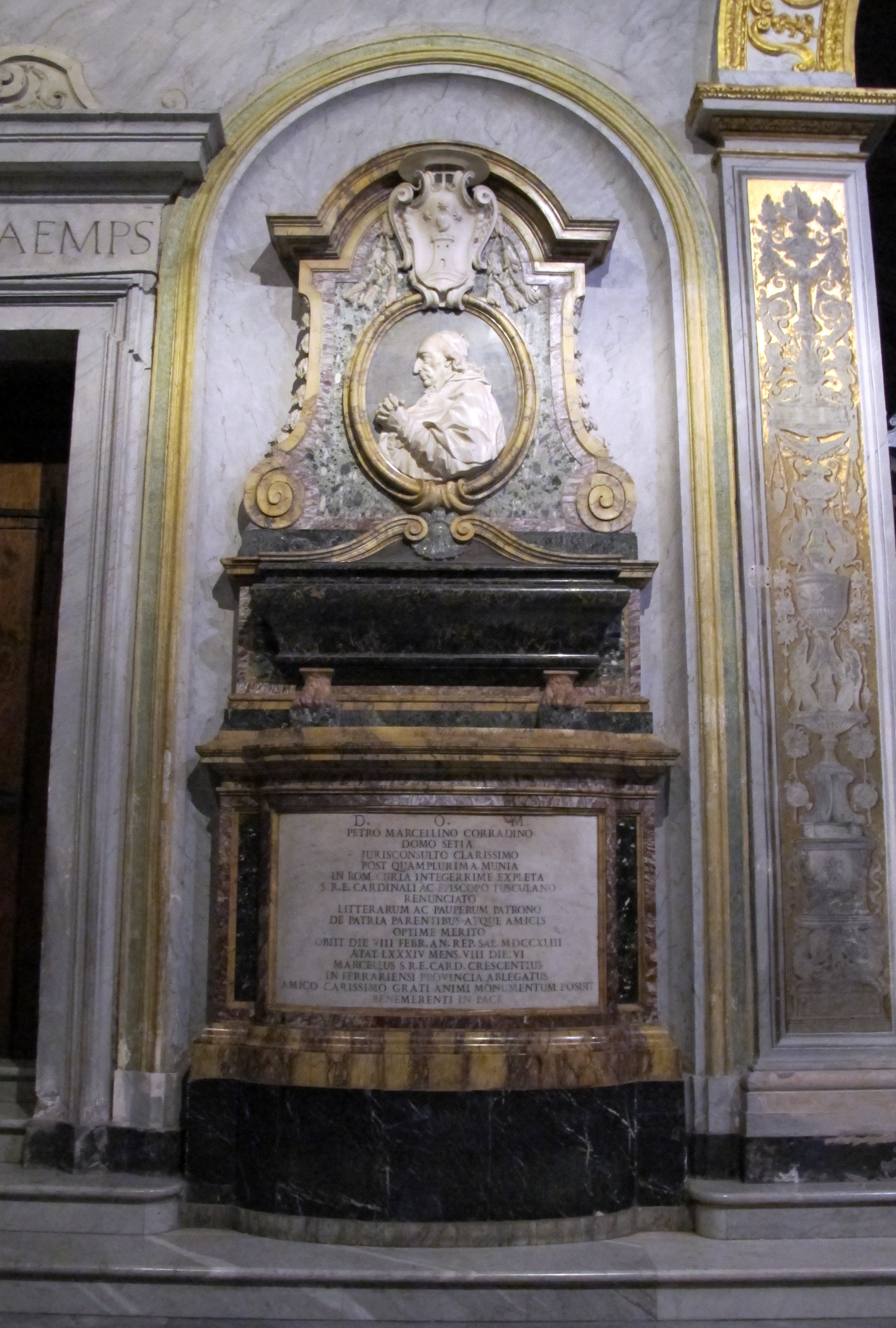
The tomb of Cdl. Corradini.

The beatification process commenced on 30 October 1992 under Pope John Paul II with the declaration of "nihil obstat" (nothing against) for the cause. It was opened in 1993 with a Mass celebrated by Cardinal Salvatore Pappalardo and its the formal conclusion was a Mass celebrated by Cardinal Salvatore De Giorgi on 17 October 1999. The Congregation for the Causes of Saints confirmed the diocesan process on 16 March 2001.

Pope Francis named Corradini Venerable on 24 April 2021.

The postulator assigned to the cause is Father Paolo Lombardo O.F.M.
