= Filippo Massarenghi =

Italian Roman Catholic prelate

Most Reverend Filippo Massarenghi
- Bishop of Bitonto
- Church: Catholic Church
- Diocese: Diocese of Bitonto
- In office: 1686–1688
- Predecessor: Francesco Antonio Gallo
- Successor: Giovanni Battista Capano

Orders
- Consecration: 19 May 1686 by Alessandro Crescenzi

Personal details
- Born: 8 February 1640 Naples, Italy
- Died: 5 June 1688 (age 48) Bitonto, Italy

Filippo Massarenghi, C.O. (8 February 1640 – 5 June 1688) was a Roman Catholic prelate who served as Bishop of Bitonto (1686–1688).

== Biography ==
Filippo Massarenghi was born in Naples, Italy in 1640. On 13 May 1686, he was appointed during the papacy of Pope Innocent XI as Bishop of Bitonto. On 19 May 1686, he was consecrated bishop by Alessandro Crescenzi (cardinal), Cardinal-Priest of Santa Prisca, with Pier Antonio Capobianco, Bishop Emeritus of Lacedonia, and Francesco Onofrio Hodierna, Bishop of Bitetto, serving as co-consecrators. He served as Bishop of Bitonto until his death on 5 June 1688.

== External links and additional sources ==
- Cheney, David M. "Diocese of Bitonto". Catholic-Hierarchy.org. (for Chronology of Bishops)
- Chow, Gabriel. "Diocese of Bitonto (Italy)". GCatholic.org. (for Chronology of Bishops)

Catholic Church titles
Preceded by Francesco Antonio Gallo	Bishop of Bitonto; 1686–1688	Succeeded by Giovanni Battista Capano
