= Roman Catholic Diocese of Saint-Pons-de-Thomières =

Coordinates: 43.49°N 2.76°E

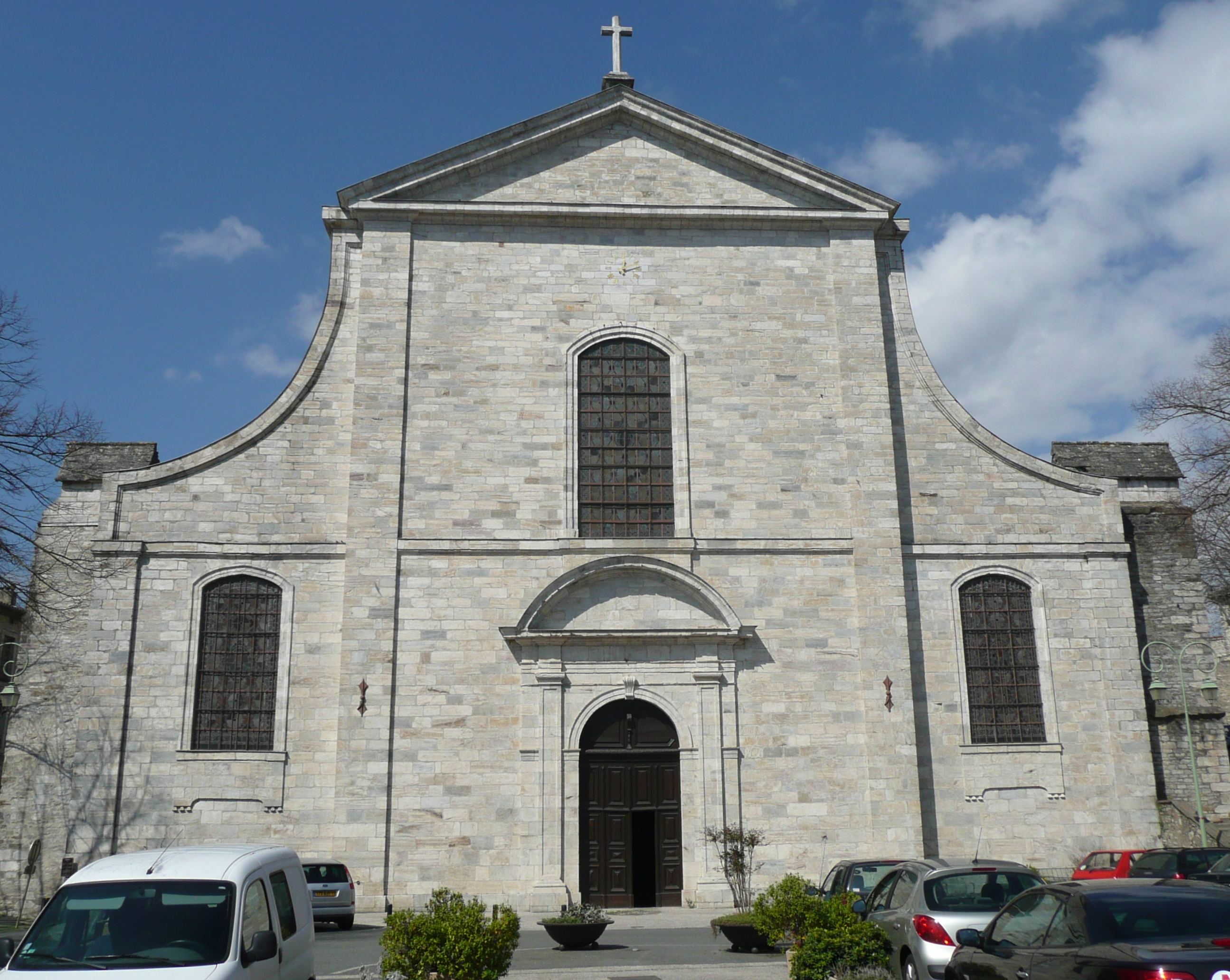
Saint-Pons-de-Thomières Cathedral restored 1899 as a parish church

The former French Catholic diocese of Saint-Pons-de-Thomières existed from 1317 until the French Revolution. Its see at Saint-Pons-de-Thomières in southern France is in the modern department of Hérault. There was the Abbey of St-Pons, founded in 936 by Raymond, Count of Toulouse, who brought there the monks of St-Géraud d'Aurillac.

By the Concordat of 1801, the territory of the diocese was added to that of the archdiocese of Montpellier.

== History ==
In the summer of 1317 Pope John XXII began a major reform of the diocesan structure of the Church in the Midi of France, with a view to combatting the Albigensian heresy. The very extensive diocese of Toulouse was separated out into five additional dioceses, with Toulouse as the Metropolitan (Lavaur, Lombez, Mirepoix, Rieux, and Saint-Papoul); Montauban was created out of the territory of Cahors and assigned to Toulouse. Clermont had the diocese of Saint-Flour carved out of its territory. Albi had Castres separated out. Périgueux was divided for the new diocese of Sarlat. Poitiers lost Luçon and Maillezais. Rodez was divided and Vabres created. Limoges had the diocese of Tulle carved out. Agen was split to created Condom. Narbonne was divided up to create Alet (originally planned as Limoux) and Saint-Pons-de-Thomières, with Narbonne as the Metropolitan.

The diocese was extremely small, containing around fifty parishes, scattered around a territory which was almost completely rural. There were only two monasteries in the diocese, the Benedictine abbey of Saint-Chinian, and the Premonstratensian abbey of Fontcaude. There was also a convent of Récollets. In 1713 the episcopal seat of Saint-Pons contained some 2000 inhabitants, a number which had not increased by 1770.

As at Maillezais and Alet (and others) Saint-Pons was founded where there was a monastery with a large church available to be used as a cathedral. The abbot of the monastery was named the first bishop, and the monks of the monastery were named the canons of the cathedral chapter. At Saint-Pons, the last abbot of Saint-Pons-de-Thomières, Pierre Roger, became the first bishop of the diocese of Saint-Pons-de-Thomières. In the new chapter, there was an archdeacon, an aumonier, a precentor and eleven other canons. There was also a theologus, who, however, did not enjoy the status of a canon. The archdeacon was elected by the canons and installed by the bishop. The canons were appointed by the bishop.

Huguenot control (purple) and influence (violet), 16th century

In 1567 Saint-Pons-de-Thomières was attacked by the Huguenots under the leadership of the Vicomte de Saint-Amans, and the cathedral was profaned. The attached monastery was reduced to rubble. The convent of women in the suburb of Saint-Magdelaine was also attacked, and though they managed to escape, the buildings were destroyed by the Huguenots.

In 1790 the diocese was suppressed by the National Constituent Assembly of the French government in the Civil Constitution of the Clergy. It was one of more than fifty dioceses in France that were deemed to be redundant. The Constituent Assembly intended that the Church should be brought under control of the State, and therefore it proclaimed that ecclesiastical dioceses should have the same territorial boundaries as the new eighty-three civil 'départements' which had just been created. Priests and bishops were to be salaried officials of the State, and elected by the 'electors' of their parish or diocese. The territory of Saint-Pons was subsumed into the new 'departement' and the new diocese of Hérault, with its headquarters at Montpellier, in the 'Metropole des Côtes de la Méditerranée'. The Bishop of Saint-Pons was also redundant, and rather than continue as a priest by taking the oath to the Civil Constitution, Bishop Louis-Henri de Bruyére de Chalabre fled the country; he died in London in 1795. On 27 February 1791 the electors of the diocese of Hérault (who did not have to be Catholics, or even Christians) met and elected as their bishop Father Dominique Pouderous, curé of the church of Saint-Pons-de-Thomières, who was consecrated a 'Constitutional Bishop' in Paris on 3 April 1791. Bishop Pouderous was unwelcome in Montpellier, however, and had to take up residence in Béziers. During the Terror, Pouderous took refuge in Saint-Pons-de-Thomières, while most of his clergy resigned their functions. Back in Béziers, he died on 10 April 1799. A new bishop, Alexandre-Victor Rouanet, was elected in April and consecrated in November 1799. He too had been a priest of Saint-Pons-de-Thomières, and, after the Concordat of 1801, when his services were no longer wanted, he retired to Saint-Pons-de-Thomières, where he died unrepentant in 1821.

After the signing of the Concordat of 1801 with First Consul Napoleon Bonaparte, the diocese of Saint-Pons de Thomières was not revived, but abolished by Pope Pius VII in his bull Qui Christi Domini of 29 November 1801.

== Bishops ==
- Pierre Roger (19 April 1318 – 1324)
- Raymond d'Apremont de Roquecorne (21 November 1324 – 1345)
- Étienne d'Audebrand or de Chamberet (13 February 1346 – 14 August 1348)
- Gilbert de Mandegaches (14 August 1348 – 30 January 1353)
- Pierre de Canillac (30 January 1353 – 29 January 1361)
- Jean de Rochechouart (29 January 1361 – 30 May 1382)
- Dominique de Florence, O.P. (30 May 1382 – 24 October 1392)
- Aimon Séchal (10 February 1393 – 5 November 1397) (Administrator)
- Pierre Ravot, (5 November 1397 – 1409)
- Geoffroi de Pompadour (17 February 1410 – 17 October 1420)
- Aimon de Nicolai, O.P. (14 March 1421 – 12 June 1422)
- Guillaume Filastre (12 June 1422 – 6 November 1428) (Administrator)
- Vital de Mauléon (29 November 1428 – 1435) (Administrator)
- Géraud de La Briçoigne (or de Charras) (16 April 1434 – 26 October 1463)
- Jean (1463–1465)
- Pierre de Treignac de Comborn (20 May 1465 – 30 October 1467)
- Antoine Balue, O.S.B. (30 October 1467 – 1501)
- François-Guillaume de Castelnau de Clermont-Lodève (17 November 1501 – 1502)
- François de Luxembourg (1502–1507 and 1507–1509)
- Cardinal Philip of Luxemburg (8 September 1509 – 9 July 1511) (Administrator)
- Cardinal François-Guillaume de Castelnau de Clermont-Lodève (9 July 1511 – 1514) (Administrator) (second time)
- Alessandro Farnese (28 July 1514 – 13 October 1534) (Cardinal)
- Cardinal Marino Grimani (November 1534)
- François-Guillaume de Castelnau de Clermont-Lodève (20 November 1534 – 24 March 1539) (Administrator) (third time)
- Jacques de Castelnau de Clermont-Lodève (24 March 1539 – 11 September 1586)
- Pierre-Jacques de Fleyres (15 June 1587 – 25 June 1633)
- Jean-Jacques de Fleyres (25 June 1633 – 1652)
- Michel Tuboeuf (26 January 1654 – 12 October 1664)
- Pierre-Jean-François de Percin de Montgaillard (12 January 1665 – 13 March 1713)
- Jean-Louis de Berton de Crillon (18 September 1713 – 22 December 1727)
- Jean-Baptiste-Paul-Alexandre de Guenet (26 January 1728 – 3 September 1769)
- Louis-Henri de Bruyére de Chalabre (12 March 1770 – 1791)

== See also ==
- Catholic Church in France
- List of Catholic dioceses in France

== Bibliography ==
=== Reference Sources ===
- Gams, Pius Bonifatius (1873). Series episcoporum Ecclesiae catholicae: quotquot innotuerunt a beato Petro apostolo. Ratisbon: Typis et Sumptibus Georgii Josephi Manz. pp. 622–623. (Use with caution; obsolete)
- Eubel, Conradus, ed. (1913). Hierarchia catholica, Tomus 1 (second ed.). Münster: Libreria Regensbergiana. p. 301. (in Latin)
- Eubel, Conradus, ed. (1914). Hierarchia catholica, Tomus 2 (second ed.). Münster: Libreria Regensbergiana. p. 175.
- Eubel, Conradus, ed. (1923). Hierarchia catholica, Tomus 3 (second ed.). Münster: Libreria Regensbergiana.
- Gauchat, Patritius (Patrice) (1935). Hierarchia catholica IV (1592–1667). Münster: Libraria Regensbergiana. p. 219.
- Ritzler, Remigius; Sefrin, Pirminus (1952). Hierarchia catholica medii et recentis aevi V (1667–1730). Patavii: Messagero di S. Antonio.
- Ritzler, Remigius; Sefrin, Pirminus (1958). Hierarchia catholica medii et recentis aevi VI (1730–1799). Patavii: Messagero di S. Antonio.

=== Studies ===
- Benedictines of Saint-Maur, ed. (1739). Gallia Christiana, In Provincias Ecclesiasticas Distributa (in Latin). Vol. Tomus Sextus (6). Paris: Ex Typographia Regia.
- Fisquet, Honoré (1864). La France pontificale (Gallia Christiana): Maguelone, Montpellier, Agde (in French). Paris: Etienne Repos. pp. 506–511.
- Fisquet, Honoré (1864). La France pontificale (Gallia Christiana): Beziers, Lodève, Saint-Pons de Thomières (in French). Paris: Etienne Repos.
- Jean, Armand (1891). Les évêques et les archevêques de France depuis 1682 jusqu'à 1801 (in French). Paris: A. Picard. p. 520.
- Pisani, Paul (1907). Répertoire biographique de l'épiscopat constitutionnel (1791–1802) (in French). Paris: A. Picard et fils.
