= Raffaello Martinelli =

Italian prelate of the Catholic Church (born 1948)

- Bishop of Frascati
- Diocese: Frascati
- Appointed: 2 July 2009
- Installed: 12 September 2009
- Predecessor: Giuseppe Matarrese
- Previous post: Priest of Bergamo

Orders
- Ordination: 8 April 1972 by Archbishop Clemente Gaddi
- Consecration: 12 September 2009 by Pope Benedict XVI

Personal details
- Born: Raffaello Martinelli; 21 June 1948 (age 77)
- Denomination: Catholic
- Coat of arms

Styles of Raffaello Martinelli
- Reference style: The Most Reverend
- Spoken style: Your Excellency
- Religious style: Bishop
- Posthumous style: not applicable

Raffaello Martinelli (born 21 June 1948) is an Italian prelate of the Catholic Church.

He was born in Villa d'Almè, and was ordained a priest for the Diocese of Bergamo on 8 April 1972. He served as bureau chief at the Congregation for the Doctrine of the Faith.

On 2 July 2009 he was appointed Bishop of Frascati by Pope Benedict XVI. He received his episcopal consecration on the following 12 September from Benedict XVI, with Cardinals Tarcisio Bertone and William Levada serving as co-consecrators, at St. Peter's Basilica.

Catholic Church titles
Preceded by Giuseppe Matarrese	Bishop of Frascati; 2009—present	Succeeded by incumbent
