= Santa Maria in Trastevere =

Basilica of Our Lady in Trastevere
- Basilica di Santa Maria in Trastevere (Italian)
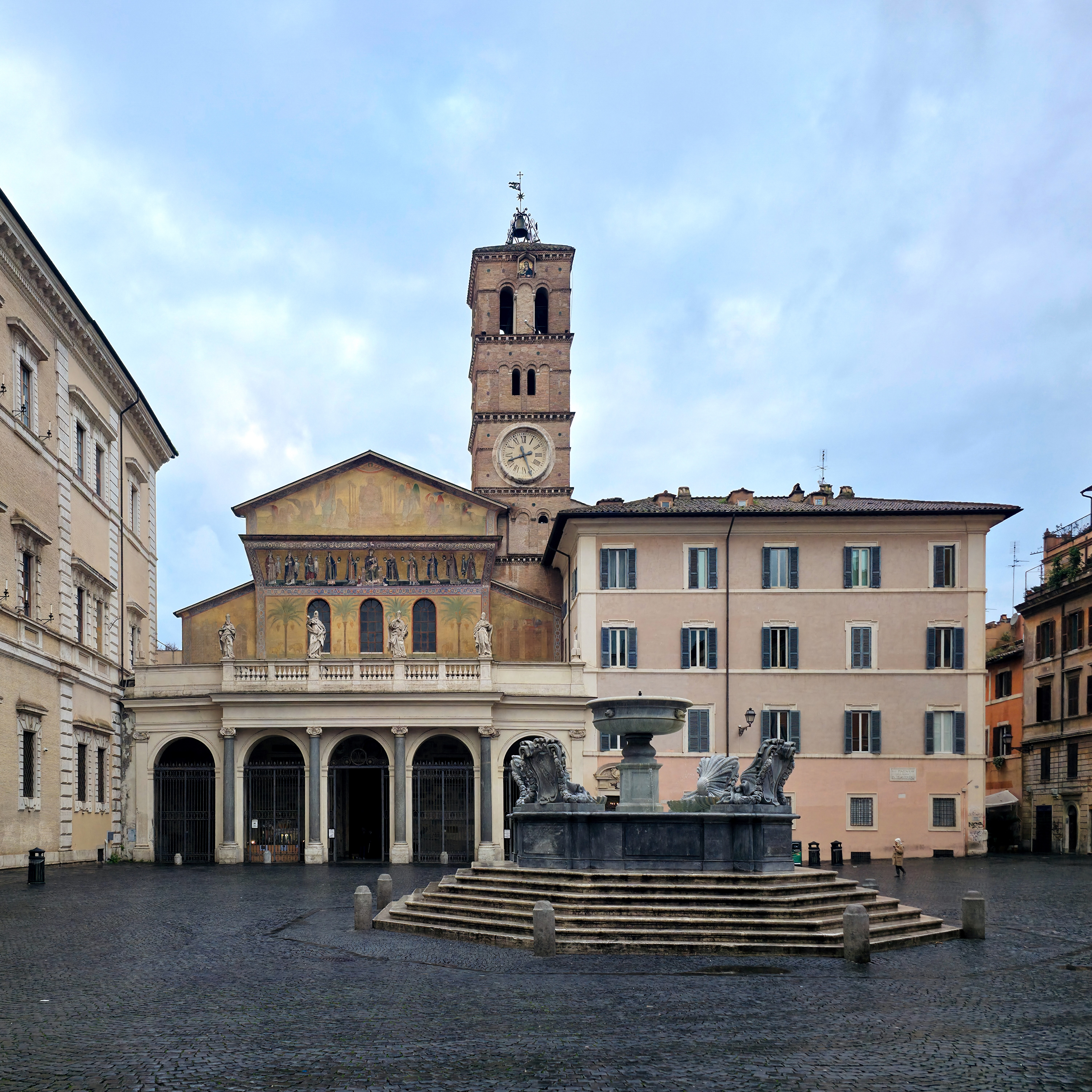
- Façade of Santa Maria in Trastevere
- Click on the map for a fullscreen view
- 41°53′22″N 12°28′11″E
- Location: Piazza Santa Maria in Trastevere, Rome
- Country: Italy
- Denomination: Catholic Church
- Tradition: Latin Church
- Website: santamariaintrastevere.it

History
- Status: Minor basilica, titular church
- Dedication: Mary, mother of God

Architecture
- Architect: Carlo Fontana
- Architectural type: Church
- Style: Romanesque
- Groundbreaking: 4th century
- Completed: 1143

Specifications
- Length: 56 metres (184 ft)
- Width: 30 metres (98 ft)

Santa Maria in Trastevere (Italian: Basilica di Santa Maria in Trastevere) is a titular church and minor basilica located in Trastevere, Rome. Traditionally considered one of the oldest churches in the city dedicated to the Virgin Mary, it has served as a cardinal titular church since the 3rd century. The present basilica, largely rebuilt under Pope Innocent II in the 12th century, is renowned for its medieval mosaics, Baroque interior, and the Madonna della Clemenza. Today, it remains a vibrant parish and a traditional site of pilgrimage, especially during Marian feasts such as the Assumption on 15 August.

== History ==
The inscription on the episcopal throne states that this is the first church in Rome dedicated to Mary, mother of Jesus, although some claim that privilege belongs to the Basilica di Santa Maria Maggiore. It is certainly one of the oldest churches in the city.

The predecessor of the present church was probably built in the early fourth century and that church was itself the successor to one of the tituli, early Christian basilicas ascribed to a patron and perhaps literally inscribed with his name. Although nothing remains to establish with certainty where any of the public Christian edifices of Rome before the time of Constantine the Great were situated, the basilica on this site was known as Titulus Callisti, based on a legend in the Liber Pontificalis, which ascribed the earliest church here to a foundation by Pope Callixtus I (died 222), whose remains, translated to the new structure, are preserved under the altar.

Callixtus founded a house-church here about 220 on the site of the Taberna meritoria, a refuge for retired soldiers. The area was made available for Christian use by Emperor Alexander Severus when he settled a dispute between the Christians and tavern-keepers, saying, according to the Liber Pontificalis "I prefer that it should belong to those who honor God, whatever be their form of worship." In 340, it was rebuilt on a larger scale by Pope Julius I. The church underwent two restorations in the fifth and eighth centuries and in 1140-43 it was re-erected on its old foundations under Pope Innocent II.

The inscriptions found in Santa Maria in Trastevere, a valuable resource illustrating the history of the Basilica, were collected and published by Vincenzo Forcella.

== Exterior ==
The Romanesque campanile is from the 12th century. Near the top, a niche protects a mosaic from the 13th century of the Madonna and Child by Pietro Cavallini. It depicts the Madonna enthroned and suckling the Child, flanked by 10 women holding lamps. This image on the façade showing Mary nursing Jesus is an early example of a popular late-medieval and renaissance type of image of the Virgin. The motif itself originated much earlier, with significant seventh-century Coptic examples at Wadi Natrun in Egypt.

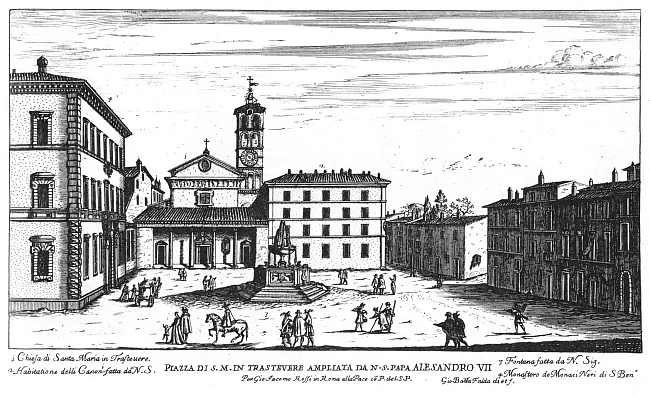
Piazza di S. Maria in Trastevere as it was at the end of the 17th century (G.B. Falda, engraving)

The façade of the church was restored in 1702 by Carlo Fontana. It is surmounted by a balustrade decorated with the statues of four popes. He replaced the ancient porch with a sloping tiled roof with the present classicizing one. The octagonal fountain in the piazza in front of the church (Piazza di Santa Maria in Trastevere), which already appears in a map of 1472, was restored by Fontana.

== Interior ==
The present nave preserves its original (pre-12th century) basilica plan and stands on the earlier foundations. The 22 granite columns with Ionic and Corinthian capitals that separate the nave from the aisles came from the ruins of the Baths of Caracalla, as did the lintel of the entrance door. When scholarship during the 19th century identified the faces in the carved decoration of the capitals as Isis, Serapis and Harpocrates, a restoration under Pius IX in 1870 hammered off the offending faces.

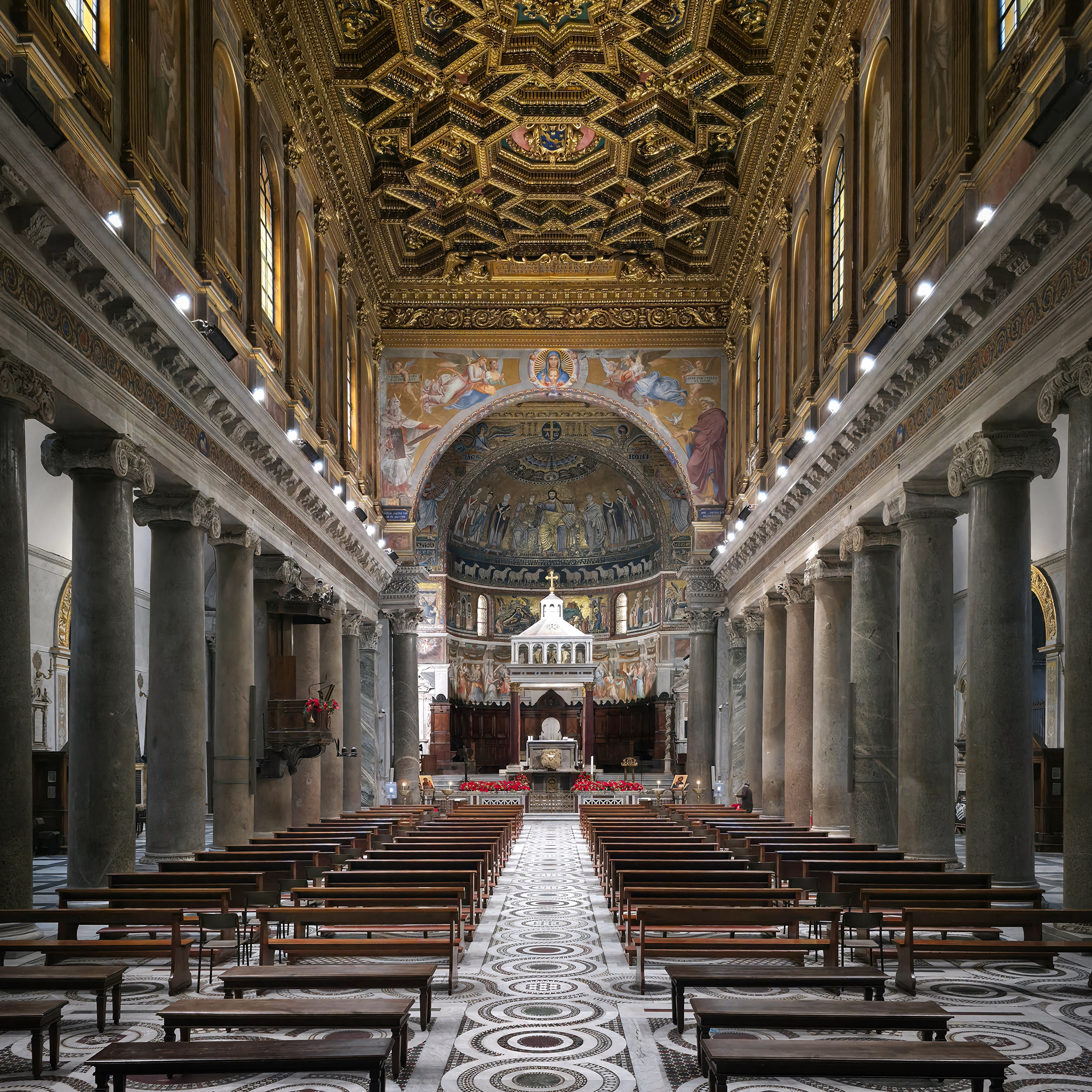
Nave featuring Domenichino's ceiling

Domenichino's octagonal ceiling painting, Assumption of the Virgin (1617) fits in the coffered ceiling that he designed.

There are a number of 12th and late 13th-century mosaics in the basilica. The "Coronation of the Virgin" (1130–1143) sits atop an apse vault, and depicts Pope Innocent II holding a model of the church. Below are mosaics on the subject of the "Life of the Virgin" by Pietro Cavallini (1291).

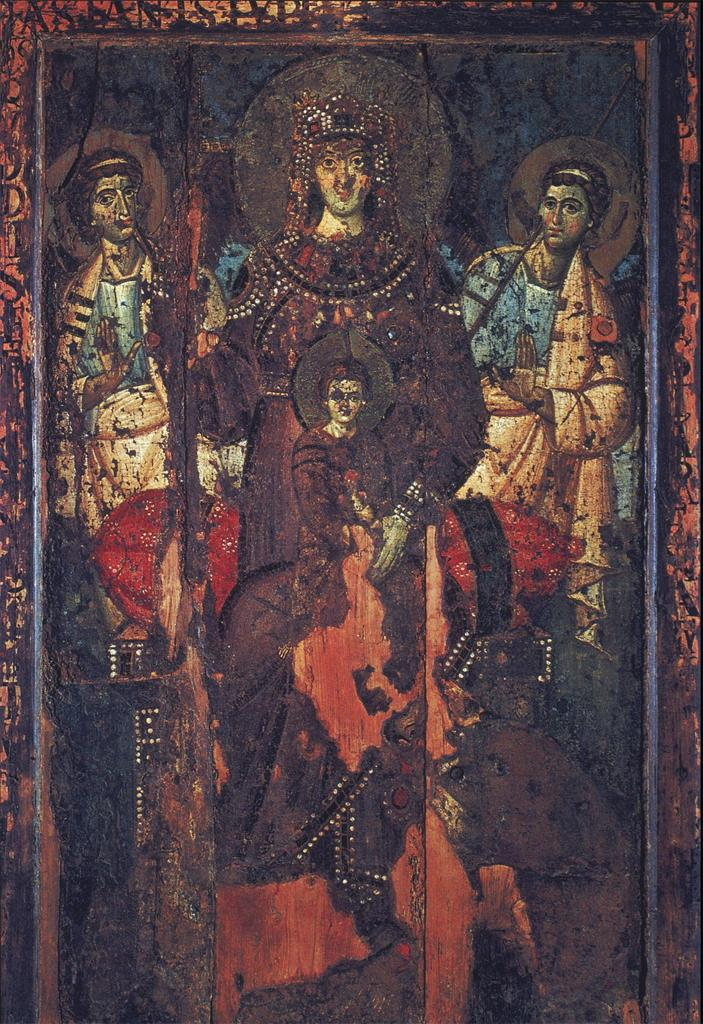
Madonna della Clemenza Trastevere, 7-8th C

In the Capella Altemps there is a unique icon of the enthroned Virgin and Child "The Madonna della Clemenza", a panel painting in encaustic, dated between the 6th and 9th century CE, probably of Byzantine origins. The Madonna della Clemenza is one of the five oldest existing Marian Icons from the medieval period. Its proximity to the rise of Christianity is one of the reasons it was believed to be a divine image.

The fifth chapel to the left is the Avila Chapel designed by Antonio Gherardi. This, and his Chapel of S. Cecilia in San Carlo ai Catinari are two of the most architecturally inventive chapels of the late-17th century in Rome. The lower order of the chapel is fairly dark and employs Borromini-like forms. In the dome, there is an opening or oculus from which four putti emerge to carry a central tempietto, all of which frames a light-filled chamber above, illuminated by windows not visible from below. Complexively, four different types of direct and indirect lighting are placed into the borders of a small space of a "pre-built side-chapel facing south along the left side-aisle of the medieval church", producing a unique "instance of the scenic use of light in baroque architecture." In the first chapel of the right nave there is Santa Francesca Romana by Jacopo Zoboli.

The church keeps a relic of Saint Apollonia, her head, as well as a portion of the Holy Sponge. Among those buried in the church are Pope Callixtus I, Pope Innocent II, Antipope Anacletus II, Cardinal Philippe of Alençon and Cardinal Lorenzo Campeggio.

== The titulus ==
The basilica has been a titular church since at least the 3rd century. Ancient sources maintain that the titulus S. Mariae was established by Pope Alexander I around 112. Later traditions give the names of the early patrons of the tituli and have retrospectively assigned them the title of cardinal. Thus at that time, the cardinal-patron of this basilica, these traditions assert, would have been Calepodius. Pope Callixtus I confirmed the titulus in 221. To honor him it was changed into Ss. Callisti et Iuliani. It was renamed S. Mariae trans Tiberim by Innocent II.

Among past cardinal priests holding the honorary titulus of Santa Maria in Trastevere have been:

- Ioannes, son of Marozia (925–931), who became Pope John XI during the Saeculum obscurum
- Gabriele Condulmer (1426–1431), who became Pope Eugene IV
- Giovanni Morone (1556–1560), played a vital role in the third period of the Council of Trent
- Mark Sittich von Hohenems Altemps (1580–1585), commissioned the Alltemps chapel in the basilica as well as the Palazzo Altemps
- Pietro Aldobrandini (1612–1620), commissioned Domenichino to create the coffered wooden ceiling of the basilica
- Henry Benedict Stuart (1759–1761), whose coat of arms, topped by a crown (some hailed him as King Henry IX of England) rather than a galero (red hat), is visible over the screen to the right of the altar.
- Pietro Marcellino Corradini (1726–1734), named venerable on April 24, 2021. His tomb is in the basilica.
- Annibale della Genga who became Pope Leo XII
- James Gibbons (1887–1921), Archbishop of Baltimore, second American cardinal and author of The Faith of Our Fathers
- Stefan Wyszyński (1957–1981), beatified on September 21, 2021

The incumbent titular holder is Carlos Osoro Sierra, Archbishop Emeritis of Madrid.

=== Full list of titulars since 1350 ===
- Guillaume d’Aigrefeuille the elder, OSB (1350–1367)
- Pierre d'Estaing (1370–1373)
- Philip of Alençon (1378–1397)
  - Niccolò Brancaccio (1378–1390), Pseudocardinal
- Ludovico Bonito (1408–1413)
- Rinaldo Brancaccio, in commendam (1413–1427)
- Gabriele Condulmer (1427–1431)
- vacant (1431–1440)
- Gerardo Landriani Capitani (1440–1445)
- Juan de Torquemada OP (1446–1460)
- Amico Agnifili (1469–1476)
- Stefano Nardini (1476–1484)
- Jorge da Costa (1484–1491)
- vacant (1491–1496)
- Juan Llopis (1496–1501)
- Juan Castellar (1503–1505)
- Marco Vigerio della Rovere OFMConv (1505–1511)
- Bandinello Sauli, in commendam (1511–1516); pro hac vice Titelkirche (1516–1517)
- Achille Grassi (1517–1523)
- Francesco Armellini Pantalassi de' Medici (1523–1528)
- Lorenzo Campeggi (1528–1534)
- Antonio Sanseverino, Knights Hospitaller (1534–1537)
- Gianvincenzo Carafa (1537–1539)
- Marino Grimani (1539–1541)
- Francesco Cornaro (1541)
- Antonio Pucci (1541–1542)
- Philippe de la Chambre OSB (1542–1543)
- Gian Pietro Carafa (1543–1544)
- Rodolfo Pio Carpi (1544–1553)
- Juan Álvarez de Toledo (1553)
- Miguel da Silva (1553–1556)
- Giovanni Morone (1556–1560)
- Cristoforo Madruzzo (1560–1561)
- Otto Truchsess von Waldburg-Trauchburg (1561–1562)
- Tiberio Crispo (1562–1565)
- Giovanni Michele Saraceni (1565–1566)
- Giovanni Ricci (1566–1570)
- Scipione Rebiba (1570–1573)
- Giacomo Savelli (1573–1577)
- Giovanni Antonio Serbelloni (1577–1578)
- Antoine Perrenot de Granvelle (1578)
- Stanislaus Hosius (1578–1579)
- Giovanni Francesco Gambara (1579–1580)
- Mark Sittich von Hohenems Altemps (1580–1595)
- Giulio Antonio Santorio (1595–1597)
- Girolamo Rusticucci (1597–1598)
- Girolamo Simoncelli (1598–1600)
- Alessandro Ottaviano de’ Medici (1600)
- Anton Maria Salviati (1600–1602)
- Domenico Pinelli (1602–1603)
- Antonio Maria Sauli (1603–1607)
- Mariano Pierbenedetti (1607–1608)
- Gregorio Petrocchini OESA (1608–1611)
- Francesco Maria Bourbon del Monte (1611–1612)
- Pietro Aldobrandini (1612–1620)
- Bartolomeo Cesi (1620–1621)
- Bonifazio Bevilacqua Aldobrandini (1621–1623)
- Franz von Dietrichstein (1623–1636)
- Giulio Savelli (1636–1639)
- Guido Bentivoglio (1639–1641)
- Cosimo de Torres (1641–1642)
- Antonio Barberini senior (1642–1646)
- Federico Cornaro (1646–1652)
- Giulio Cesare Sacchetti (1652)
- Marzio Ginetti (1652–1653)
- Girolamo Colonna (1653–1659)
- Giovanni Battista Pallotta (1659–1661)
- Ulderico Carpegna (1661–1666)
- Niccolò Albergati-Ludovisi (1666–1676)
- Luigi Alessandro Omodei (1676–1677)
- Pietro Vito Ottoboni (1677–1680)
- Francesco Albizzi (1680–1681)
- Carlo Pio di Savoia (1681–1683)
- Decio Azzolino (1683–1684)
- Paluzzo Paluzzi Altieri degli Albertoni (1684–1689)
- Giulio Spinola (1689)
- Gaspare Carpegna (1689–1698)
- Giambattista Spinola (1698–1704)
- Urbano Sacchetti (1704–1705)
- Leandro Colloredo CO (1705–1709)
- Tommaso Ruffo (1709–1726)
- Pietro Marcellino Corradini (1726–1734)
- Giorgio Spinola (1734–1737)
- Luis Antonio Belluga y Moncada (1737–1738)
- Francesco Antonio Finy (1738–1740)
- Giuseppe Accoramboni (1740–1743)
- Francesco Antonio Finy (1743)
- Francesco Scipione Maria Borghese (1743–1752)
- Giuseppe Spinelli (1752–1753)
- Joaquín Fernández Portocarrero (1753–1756)
- Camillo Paolucci (1756–1758)
- Giacomo Oddi (1758–1759)
- Henry Benedict Mary Clement Stuart of York (1759–1761); in commendam (1761–1763)
- Fabrizio Serbelloni (1763)
- Pietro Colonna Pamphili (1766–1780)
- Giovanni Ottavio Manciforte Sperelli (1781)
- vacant (1781–1789)
- Tommaso Antici (1789–1798)
- Francesco Maria Pignatelli (1800–1815)
- Annibale Sermattei della Genga (1816–1823)
- Gianfrancesco Falzacappa (1823–1830)
- Raffaele Mazio (1830–1832)
- Benedetto Barberini (1832–1856); in commendam (1856–1863)
- vacant (1863–1874)
- Alessandro Franchi (1874–1878)
- Lorenzo Nina (1879–1885)
- James Gibbons (1887–1921)
- Giovanni Tacci Porcelli (1921–1928)
- Pedro Segura y Sáenz (1929–1957)
- Stefan Wyszyński (1957–1981)
- Józef Glemp (1983–2013)
- Loris Francesco Capovilla (2014–2016)
- Carlos Osoro Sierra (since 2016)

== Significant events ==
In 38BC a gush of oil from underground occurred, as mentioned by Dio Cassius and St. Jerome. This mysterious event was given the Latin name fons olei. It was interpreted by Jewish people who lived concentrated in Trastevere as the announcement of the Messiah. This legendary event is depicted in the Cavallini mosaic of Christ's birth.

In 1634, the icon of the Madonna di Strada Cupa which was then placed at the foot of the Janiculum Hill was canonically crowned. It was the third image to receive a canonical coronation.

In 1659, the icon of Madonna della Clemenza was canonically crowned. It was the second image inside the church to be crowned.

On March 25, 1887, Cardinal James Gibbons took possession of this titular church and "delivered a powerful sermon defending the American constitutional model of church-state relations."

In July 2014, the wedding of Prince Amedeo of Belgium, Hereditary Archduke of Austria-Este, and Elisabetta Rosboch von Wolkenstein was held at the basilica.

On March 11, 2018, Pope Francis celebrated mass at the basilica to commemorate the 50th anniversary of the foundation of the Community of Sant'Egidio.

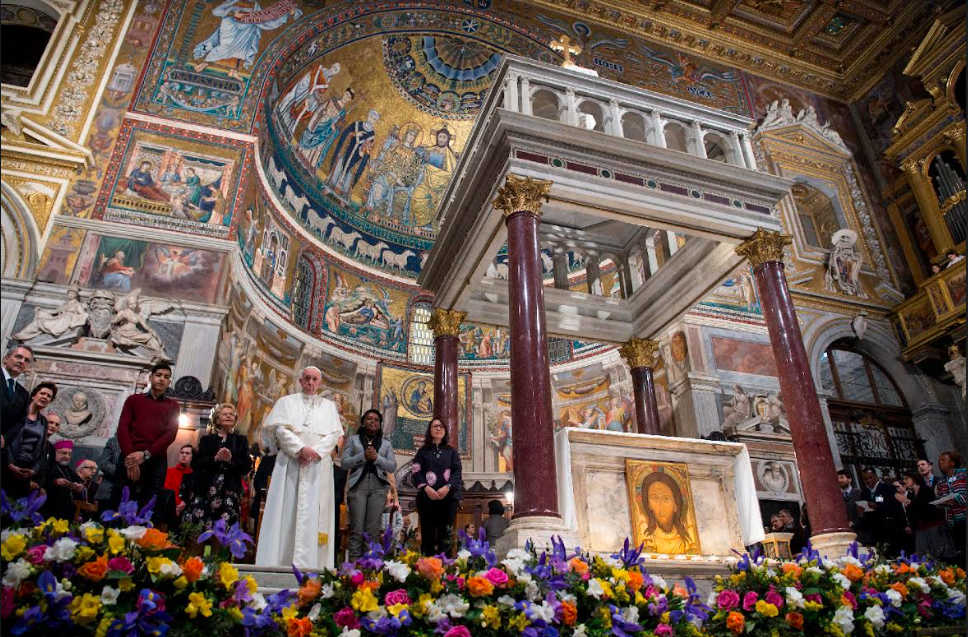
Pope Francis celebrates mass at Santa Maria in Trastevere - March 11, 2018

== Gallery ==
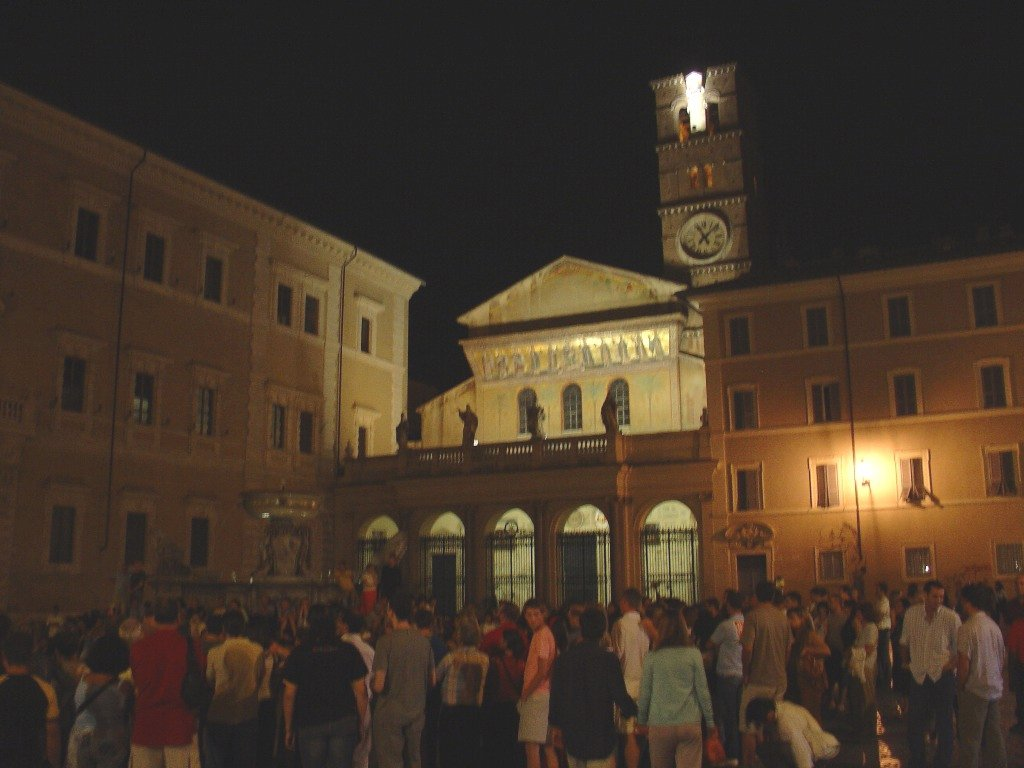
The square before the basilica is a centre of Trastevere nightlife.

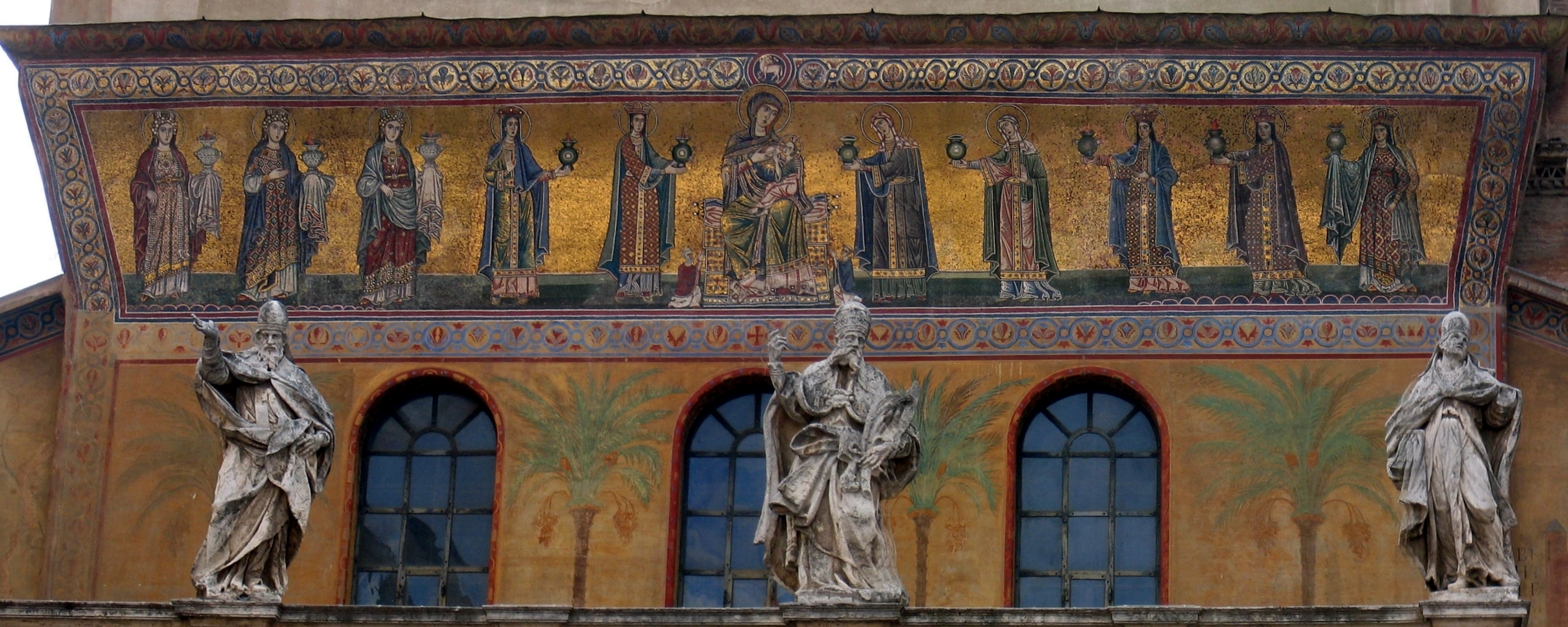
12th-century mosaic of the Virgin Mary with the infant Jesus flanked by 10 women holding lamps

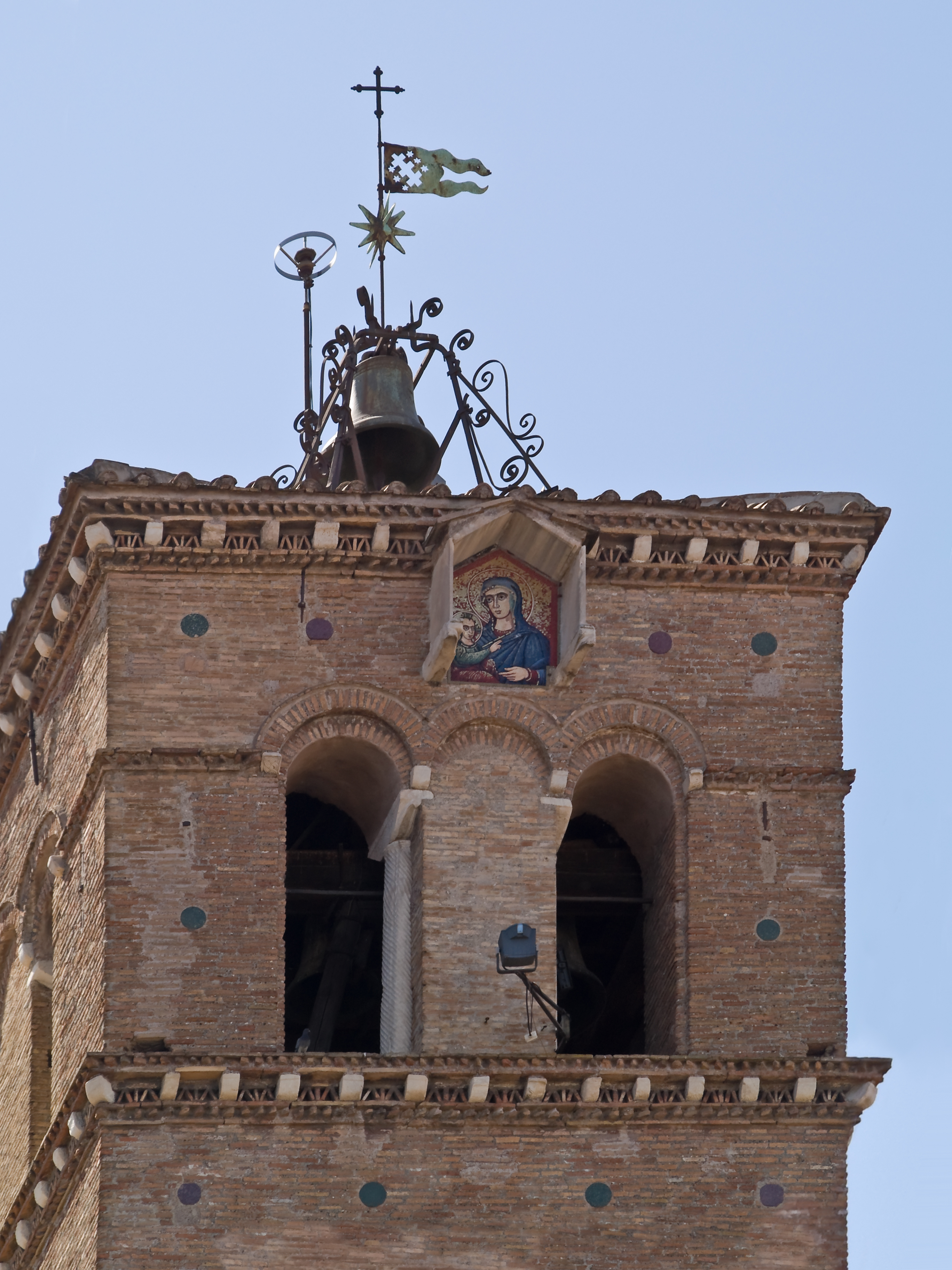
Madonna and Child at the top of the campanile

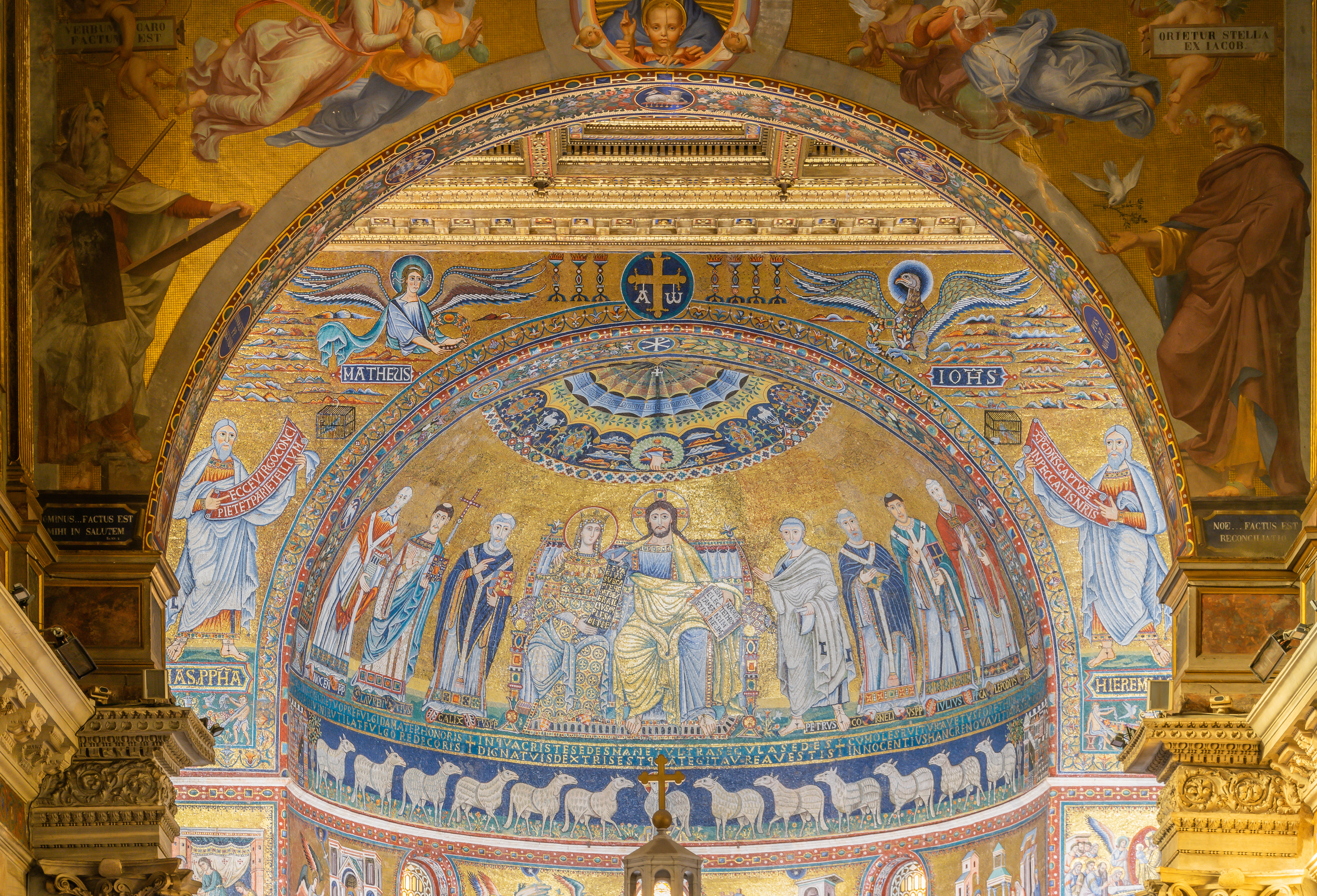
12th and 13th-century mosaics in the apse

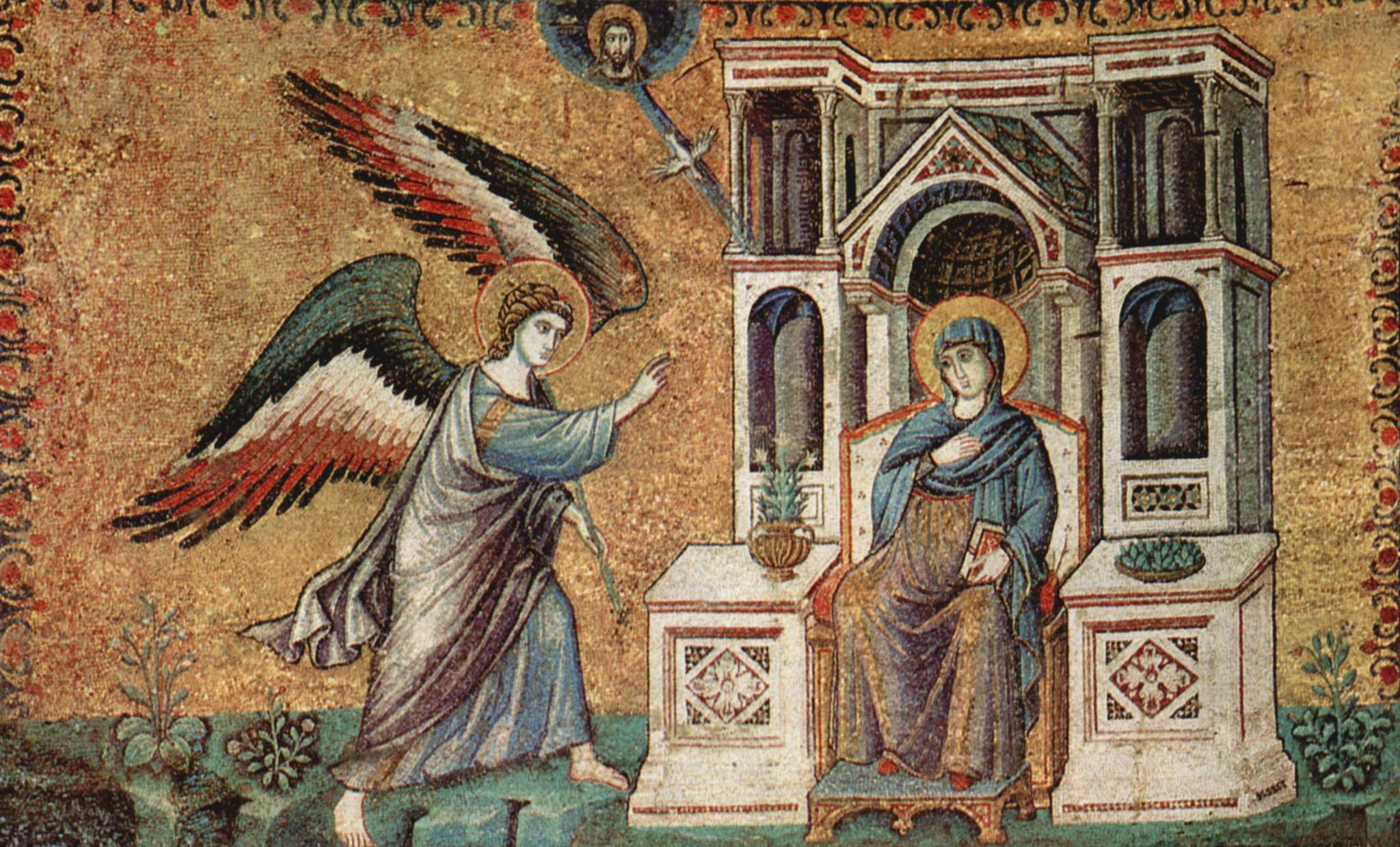
Mosaic of the Annunciation by Cavallini (1291)

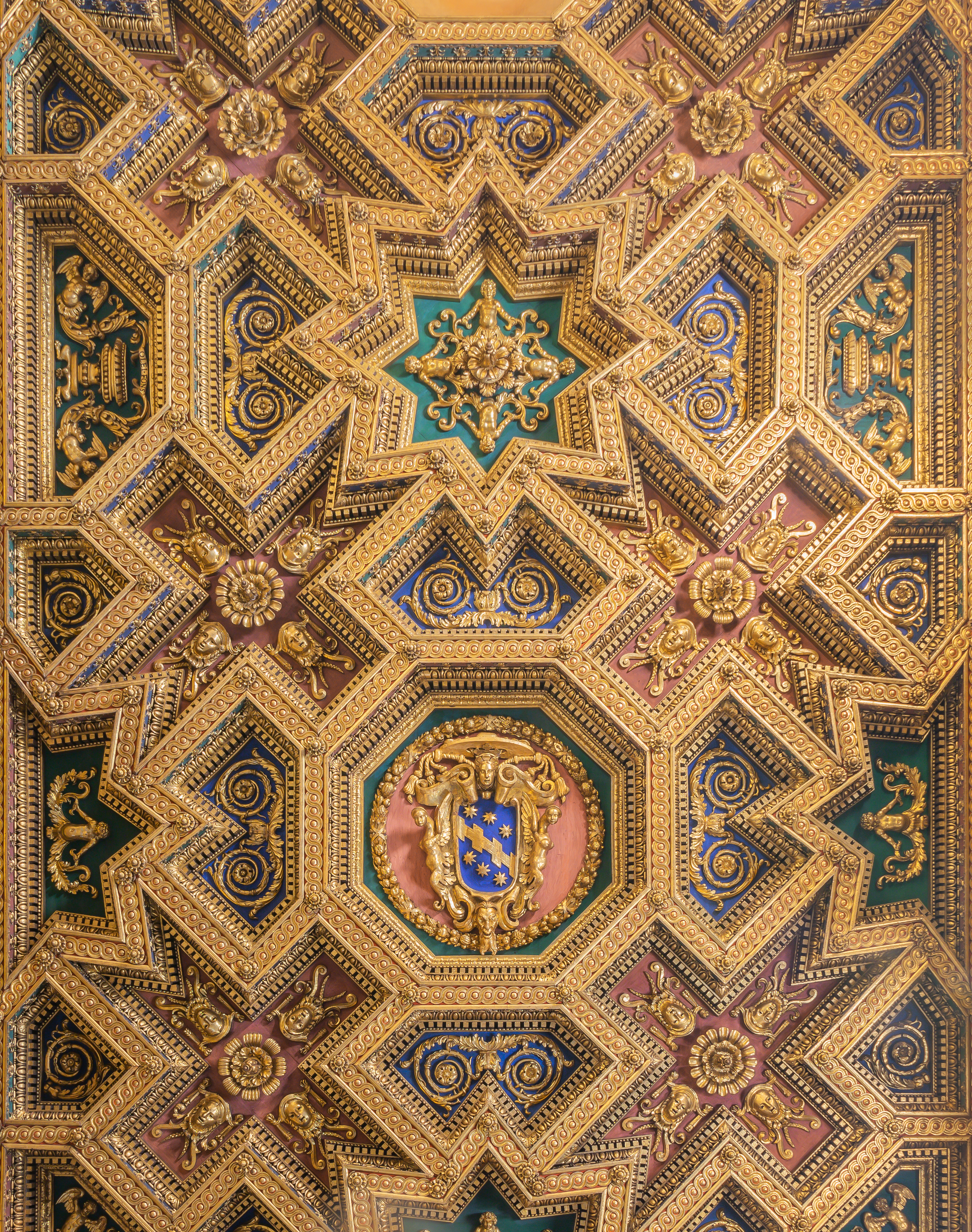
Close-up of ceiling

== See also ==
- Roman Catholic Marian churches
- Fountain in Piazza Santa Maria in Trastevere
- Domenichino
- Jacopo Zoboli

Preceded by Santa Maria sopra Minerva	Landmarks of Rome; Santa Maria in Trastevere	Succeeded by Santa Maria in Via
