= Madonna della Clemenza =

7th or 8th century painting

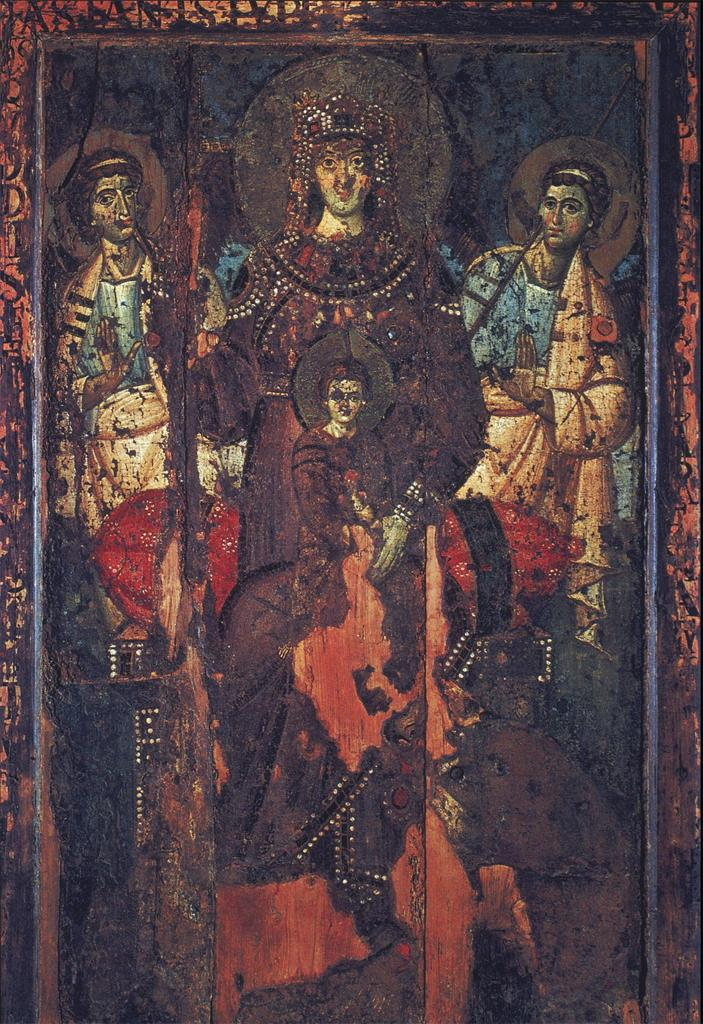
Madonna della ClemenzaTrastevere, Rome, Italy Date: 7–8th C

The Madonna della Clemenza is a panel painting in encaustic (with later over-painting), variously dated between the 6th and 9th century, in the Basilica Santa Maria in Trastevere, Rome, Italy. It is an icon of the enthroned Virgin and Child. The origins of the painting are debated among scholars, but it is regarded as having been produced in Rome, perhaps commissioned by the ethnically Greek Pope John VII (r. 705–707), one of the Byzantine popes, which would help to account for the especially strong Greek elements. The Madonna della Clemenza is one of the five oldest existing Marian Icons from the medieval period. Its proximity to the rise of Christianity is one of the reasons it was believed to be a divine image. It is the largest of the five at 164 x 116 cm (64.5in by 45.5 in).

While most scholars believe that the painting was always intended for Santa Maria in Trastevere, where it appears to be documented in the reign of Pope Gregory IV (828–844), others suggest this was not its original home. It may instead have been commissioned for a new palace John VII began in the Greek quarter around Santa Maria Antiqua, which was never finished in his short reign.

== Description ==
In the painting, Mary is depicted in the "Maria Regina" or Regina Coeli iconography nearly unique to Rome in late antiquity, wearing costume specific to Byzantine empresses. In this and many other early icons, Mary is formulated in the Maesta style. Maesta is a popular style for Marian iconography in which Mary is depicted as the Queen of Heaven, in regal style seated on a throne and complete with a crown covered in pearls. The Christ Child is dressed in purple robes similar to Mary's, but his were apparently originally painted with gold, while hers were not. Both Mary and Christ have golden halos. Mary is seated cradling the Christ child in one arm, and holding a cross staff in the other. This style of Mary holding Christ is unusual, as Mary usually holds Christ more securely. Here he sits erect on her lap, with her hand probably just on his thigh.

== History ==
It has one of the first known donor portraits. Although the painting is badly worn, kneeling at the feet of the Virgin Mother is an image of what is believed to be Pope John VII. In 1593, during the Counter-Reformation, the Icon was reframed and placed on the central Capella Altemps inside the Basilica Santa Maria di Trastevere as a means to display the power of this Marian cult image. The idea behind the re-framing, was that if you framed an Icon, it would be transformed from a divine object into a piece of art, thereby removing the stigma of it being considered a false idol.

Pope Alexander VII granted the icon a decree of Canonical coronation and it took place on 1659.

In 1988, there was an exhibition held at the Santa Maria Maggiore in Rome. All five of the oldest Marian Icons were represented, however, the representation of the Madonna della Clemenza was not the original but a photographic copy due to the delicate state of the original painting.

The icon can still be seen over the Capella Altemps in the Basilica Santa Maria di Trastevere in Rome.
