= Giuseppe Accoramboni =

Catholic cardinal

His Eminence Giuseppe Accoramboni
- Cardinal-Bishop of Frascati
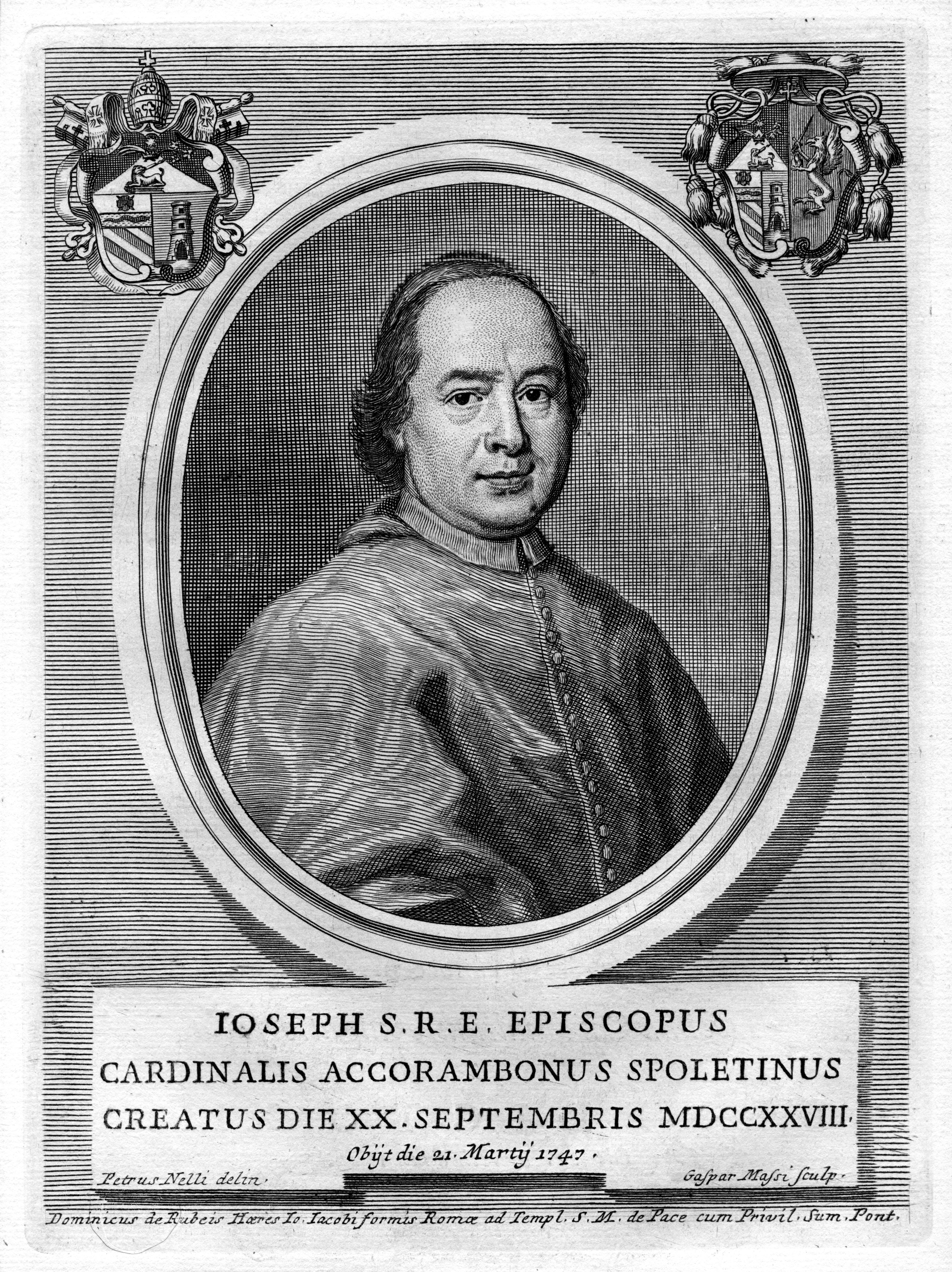
- Church: Roman Catholic
- Appointed: 11 March 1743
- Term ended: 21 March 1747
- Predecessor: Pietro Marcellino Corradini
- Successor: Vincenzo Bichi
- Previous posts: Cardinal-Priest of Santa Maria in Trastevere (1740–43); Cardinal-Priest of Santa Maria in Traspontina (1728–40); Archbishop of Imola (1728–39); Titular Archbishop of Philippi (1724–28)

Orders
- Ordination: 14 February 1723
- Consecration: 21 September 1724 by Pope Benedict XIII
- Created cardinal: 20 September 1728 by Pope Benedict XIII
- Rank: Cardinal-Bishop

Personal details
- Born: 24 September 1672 Preci, Papal States
- Died: 21 March 1747 (aged 74)
- Buried: Sant'Ignazio, Rome
- Education: University of Perugia

Styles of Giuseppe Accoramboni
- Reference style: His Eminence
- Spoken style: Your Eminence
- Informal style: Cardinal
- See: Imola

Giuseppe Accoramboni JUD (24 September 1672 – 21 March 1747) was an Italian Cardinal who served as Cardinal-Bishop of Frascati, and had previously been Archbishop of Imola.

== Early life ==
Accoramboni was born in Castel de Preci, diocese of Spoleto and was baptised on the same day. He completed his education at the University of Perugia, obtaining a doctorate in both canon and civil law (utroque iure) in 1694. He worked as an auditor of Michelangelo Cardinal Conti future Pope Innocent XIII. He also served as a Sub-datary of His Holiness from 1721. He was a canon of the patriarchal Vatican basilica and worked at the Sacred Roman Rota.

He was ordained priest on 14 February 1723. He served on the Supreme Tribunals of the Apostolic Signatura and of Grace.

== Episcopate ==
He was appointed archbishop of Philippi in partibus infidelium on 11 September 1724 and was consecrated on 21 September by Pope Benedict XIII with Mondilio Orsini, Titular Archbishop of Corinthus, and Pierre-Guérin de Tencin, Archbishop of Embrun, serving as co-consecrators. He served as a consultor of the Ss.CC. of Rites and of the Roman and Universal Inquisition. He was transferred to the see of Imola, with personal title of archbishop and retaining all his other posts on 12 April 1728.

== Cardinalate ==
He was created and proclaimed Cardinal-Priest of S. Maria in Traspontina in the consistory of 20 September 1728. He participated in the conclave of 1730, which elected Pope Clement XII. He was also able to participate in the conclave of 1740, which elected Pope Benedict XIV. He was appointed to the order of Cardinal-Bishops taking the suburbicarian see of Frascati on 11 March 1743.

He died in 1747, around 9 p.m. His body was exposed in the church of Sant'Ignazio, Rome, and buried in that same church.

Catholic Church titles
Preceded by	Titular Archbishop of Philippi; 1724–1728	Succeeded by Carlo Alberto Guidobono Cavalchini
Preceded by Ulisse Giuseppe Gozzadini	Archbishop (Personal Title) of Imola; 1728–1739	Succeeded by Giovanni Tommaso Maria Marelli
Preceded by Luis Antonio Belluga y Moncada	Cardinal-Priest of Santa Maria in Traspontina; 1728–1740	Succeeded by Marcello Crescenzi
Preceded by Francesco Antonio Finy	Cardinal-Priest of Santa Maria in Trastevere; 1740–1743	Succeeded by Francesco Antonio Finy
Preceded by Pier Marcellino Corradini	Cardinal-Bishop of Frascati; 1743–1747	Succeeded by Vincenzo Bichi
