= Antonio Polcenigo =

Italian Roman Catholic prelate

Most Reverend Antonio Polcenigo
- Bishop of Feltre
- Church: Catholic Church
- In office: 1684–1724
- Predecessor: Bartolomeo Gera
- Successor: Pietro Maria Suárez

Orders
- Ordination: 8 August 1683
- Consecration: 1 May 1684 by Alessandro Crescenzi (cardinal)

Personal details
- Born: 18 April 1647 Fanna, Italy
- Died: April 1724 (aged 76–77) Feltre, Italy

Antonio Polcenigo (18 April 1647 – April, 1724) was a Roman Catholic prelate who served as Bishop of Feltre (1684–1724).

== Biography ==
Antonio Polcenigo was born in Fanna, Italy on 18 April 1647 and ordained a priest on 8 August 1683. On 24 April 1684, he was appointed during the papacy of Pope Innocent XI as Bishop of Feltre. On 1 May 1684, he was consecrated bishop by Alessandro Crescenzi (cardinal), Cardinal-Priest of Santa Prisca, with Francesco Maria Giannotti, Bishop of Segni, and Francesco Onofrio Hodierna, Bishop of Bitetto, serving as co-consecrators. He served as Bishop of Feltre until his death in April 1724.

While bishop, he was the principal co-consecrator of Giovanni Tommaso Maria Marelli, Archbishop of Urbino (1716).

== External links and additional sources ==
- Cheney, David M. "Diocese of Feltre". Catholic-Hierarchy.org. (for Chronology of Bishops) ^{[self-published]}
- Chow, Gabriel. "Diocese of Feltre (Italy)". GCatholic.org. (for Chronology of Bishops) ^{[self-published]}

Catholic Church titles
Preceded by Bartolomeo Gera	Bishop of Feltre; 1684–1724	Succeeded by Pietro Maria Suárez
