= Ulisse Giuseppe Gozzadini =

Catholic Bishop and Cardinal

His Eminence Ulisse Giuseppe Gozzadini
- Bishop of Imola
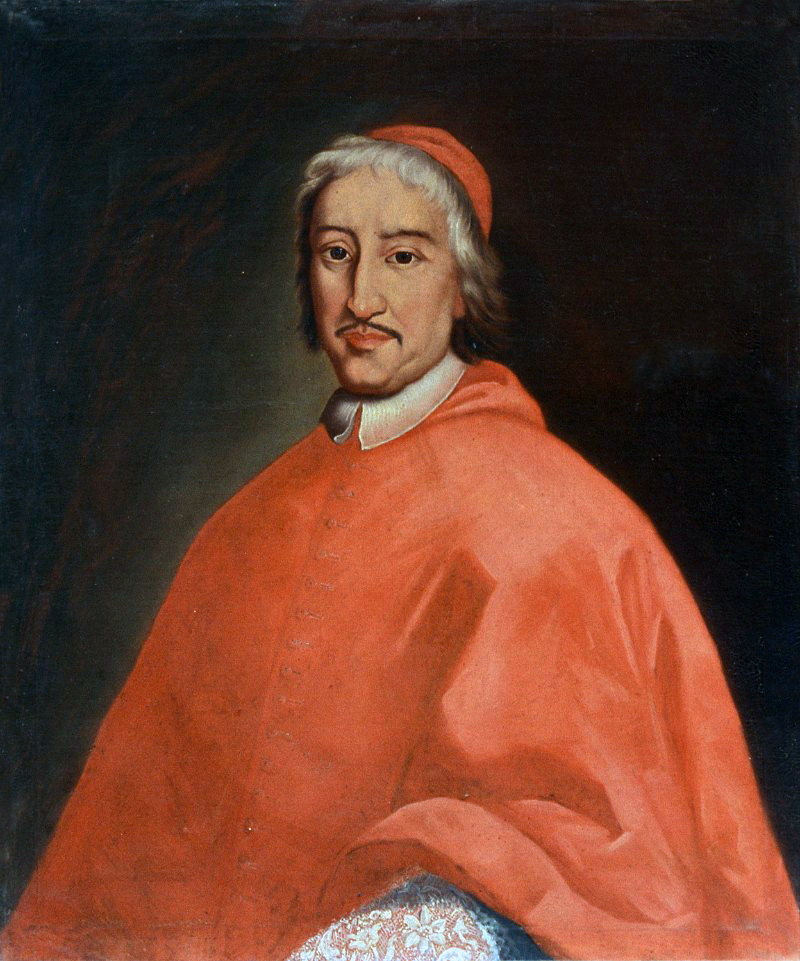
- Church: Catholic Church
- Diocese: Imola
- Appointed: 19 Feb 1710
- Term ended: 20 Mar 1728
- Predecessor: Filippo Antonio Gualterio
- Successor: Giuseppe Accoramboni
- Other posts: Cardinal-Priest of Santa Croce in Gerusalemme (1709-1728)

Orders
- Consecration: 12 September 1700 by Bandino Panciatici
- Created cardinal: 15 April 1709 by Pope Clement XI
- Rank: Cardinal-Priest

Personal details
- Born: 10 October 1650 Bologna, Italy
- Died: 20 March 1728 (aged 77) Imola, Italy

Ulisse Giuseppe Gozzadini (10 October 1650 – 20 March 1728) was an Italian Cardinal who served as bishop of Imola.

== Early life ==
Gozzadini was born in Bologna and was of a patrician family. He was the son of Palatine Count Marcantonio Gozzadini and Ginevra Leoni. He was educated at the University of Bologna, where he received a doctorate in canon law in 1670 and a doctorate in civil law in 1674. He was a page in the court of the Grand Duchy of Tuscany in 1658. He served as a canon theologian of the cathedral chapter of Bologna from 1673 to 1693, and a professor of law at the University of Bologna from 1674 to 1694. He went to Rome in 1693. He was made a canon of the chapter of the patriarchal Vatican basilica in 1691. He served as secretary of Briefs to the Princes from 1697.

== Episcopate ==
He was appointed archbishop of Teodosia in partibus infidelium on 8 September 1700 and was consecrated on 12 September 1700 in Rome by Bandino Panciatici, Cardinal-Priest of San Pancrazio, with Prospero Bottini, Titular Archbishop of Myra, and Leonardo Marsili, Archbishop of Siena, serving as co-consecrators. He was confirmed as secretary of Briefs to the Princes by the new, pope, Pope Clement XI on 7 December 1700.

== Cardinalate ==
He was created and proclaimed Cardinal-Priest of Santa Croce in Gerusalemme in the consistory of 15 April 1709. He was released from his see and transferred to the see of Imola, with personal title of archbishop on 19 February 1710. He served as Legate a latere to represent the pope at the wedding, of King Philip V of Spain and Princess Isabella Farnese of Parma on 20 August 1714. He participated in the conclave of 1721, which elected Pope Innocent XIII. He also participated in the conclave of 1724, which elected Pope Benedict XIII. He died in 1728 of an apoplexy in Imola.

Catholic Church titles
Preceded by Francesco de' Marini	Titular Archbishop of Teodosia; 1700–1710	Succeeded by Domenico de Zaoli
Preceded by Pedro de Salazar Gutiérrez de Toledo	Cardinal-Priest of Santa Croce in Gerusalemme; 1709–1728	Succeeded by Prospero Lorenzo Lambertini
Preceded by Filippo Antonio Gualtieri	Archbishop (Personal Title) of Imola; 1710–1728	Succeeded by Giuseppe Accoramboni
