= Suburbicarian Diocese of Frascati =

Roman Catholic diocese in Italy

Coordinates: 41.8167°N 12.6833°E

Suburbicarian See of Frascati Tusculanus

Catholic

Location
- Country: Italy
- Ecclesiastical province: Diocese of Rome

Statistics
- Area: 168 km^{2} (65 sq mi)
- Population: Total; Catholics: (as of 2013); 124,500 (est.); 117,700 (est.) (94.5%)
- Parishes: 24

Information
- Denomination: Roman Catholic
- Rite: Latin Rite
- Established: 3rd Century
- Cathedral: Basilica Cattedrale di San Pietro Apostolo
- Secular priests: 27 (diocesan); 20 (Religious Orders)

Current leadership
- Pope: Leo XIV
- Bishop: Tarcisio Bertone (cardinal-bishop); Stefano Russo (diocesan bishop)
- Bishops emeritus: Raffaello Martinelli

Map
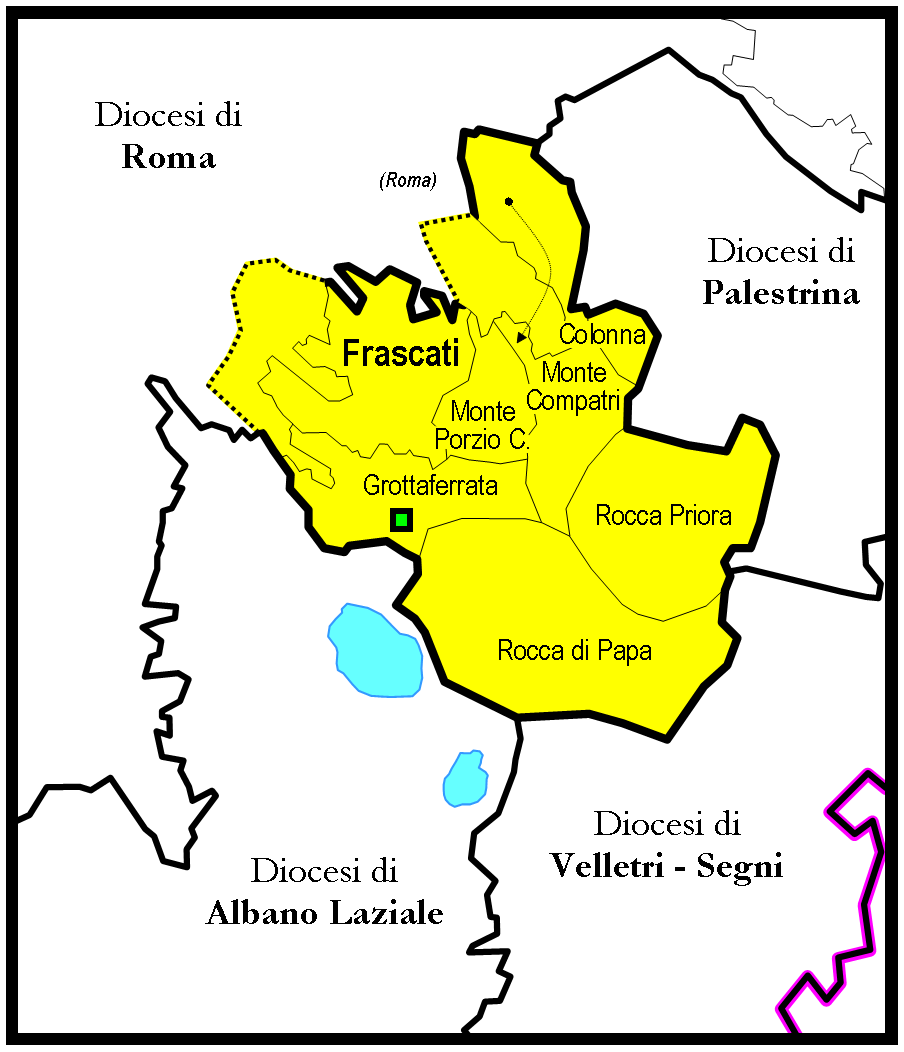

Website
- www.diocesifrascati.it

The Diocese of Frascati (Lat.: Tusculana) is a Latin suburbicarian see of the Diocese of Rome and a diocese of the Catholic Church in Italy, based at Frascati, near Rome. The bishop of Frascati is a Cardinal Bishop; from the Latin name of the area, the bishop has also been called Bishop of Tusculum. (Note: Tusculum had earlier been the property of the Monastery of Subiaco: P. Egidi, "L'abbazia sublacense e la signoria di Tuscolo," Archivio della Società Romana di storia patria 25 (1902), pp. 470–477.) Tusculum was destroyed in 1191. The bishopric moved from Tusculum to Frascati, a nearby town which is first mentioned in the pontificate of Pope Leo IV. Until 1962, the Cardinal-Bishop was concurrently the diocesan bishop of the see. Pope John XXIII removed the Cardinal Bishops from any actual responsibility in their suburbicarian dioceses and made the title purely honorific.

== Relationships during the 17th century ==
Like other dioceses close to Rome, Frascati became a bishopric of choice for Cardinals of powerful papal families during the 17th century; a period known for its unabashed nepotism. Frascati Bishops of that era were significantly intertwined:

- Odoardo Farnese (1624–1626) – uncle of Odoardo Farnese, Duke of Parma against whom the Barberini fought the First War of Castro.
- Bonifazio Bevilacqua Aldobrandini (1626–1627) - adopted "nephew" of Aldobrandini family Pope Clement VIII whose grand-niece Olimpia Aldobrandini married Camillo Pamphili, nephew of Pope Innocent X.
- Marcello Lante della Rovere (1629–1639) – previous Bishop of Palestrina (the comune owned by the Barberini) uncle of Ippolito Lante Montefeltro della Rovere who was a close friend and counsel to Maffeo Barberini.
- Giulio Cesare Sacchetti (1652–1655) – twice nominated for the papacy by Antonio Barberini.
- Antonio Barberini (1655–1661) – nephew of Pope Urban VIII, brother of Taddeo Barberini (Prince of Palestrina), exiled by Pope Innocent X, later helped engineer the marriage of his nephew Don Maffeo Barberini to the grand-niece of Pope Innocent X.
- Girolamo Colonna (1661–1666) – brother of Anna Colonna (wife of Taddeo Barberini, nephew of Pope Urban VIII), uncle of Don Maffeo Barberini and brother-in-law of Antonio Barberini.
- Carlo Rossetti (1676–1680) – prelate to Pope Urban VIII and Antonio Barberini, supporter of Giulio Cesare Sacchetti

== Bishops ==
=== To 1200 ===
- Sisinnius (732)
- Nicetas (743–745)
- Pietro (847)

==== Bishops of Labico ====
- Pietro (761)
- Giorgio (826)
- Pietro (853–869)
- Leo (879)
- Lunisso (963–968)
- Benedetto (998–999)
- Leo (?) (1004)
- Johannes Homo (1015)
- Domenico (1024–1036)

==== Bishops of Tusculum ====
- Giovanni (1044) (Note: Source for the period 1044-1130: Rudolf Hüls, Kardinäle, Klerus und Kirchen Roms: 1049–1130, Bibliothek des Deutschen Historischen Instituts in Rom 1977, pp. 138–143)
- Pietro (before 1057 – after 1062)
- Giovanni (1065–1071)
- Giovanni Minuto (1073–1094)
- Bovo (1099)
- Giovanni 'Marsicano' (Note: Giovanni Romano (contemporaries did not call him Marsicano) became a monk at the Abbey of Bec under the well-known Anselm. He became a Canon of Beauvais. Pope Urban II named him Abbot of San Salvatore in Talese, and, in 1099, Pope Paschal II named him Bishop of Tusculum. Around one-third of Pope Paschal's appointments to the College of Cardinals were monks. In 1101 Cardinal Giovanni was sent as Papal Legate to England. In 1108 the Pope appointed him his Vicar for Rome while he travelled to Benevento. In 1111, he and Bishop Leo Marsicano of Ostia organized the resistance against Emperor Henry V, who had just captured the Pope and most of the cardinals. In March 1119 he attended a Synod in Benevento. He died shortly thereafter. Stephan Freund, "Giovanni di Tuscolo", Dizionario biografico degli Italiani 56 (2001). (in Italian) Retrieved: 2016-10-21. K. Ganzer, "Das römische Kardinalkollegium," in: Le istituzioni ecclesiastiche della "Societas christiana" dei secoli XI-XII, I, Papato, cardinalato ed episcopato, (Milano 1974), pp. 153–181. (1100–1119))
- Divizo (Note: Divitius, Denys, Dionysius, Divizo, Denigo) (1121–1122)
- Gilles of Paris (1123–1139) (Note: During the period 1130–1138 Gilles followed obedience of Anacletus II. A source for the period 1130-1182: Johannes M. Brixius, Die Mitglieder des Kardinalskollegiums von 1130-1181, Berlin 1912, p. 134)
- Imar (or Icmar), Benedictine (1142–1161) (Note: Some sources say that Hugh de Saint-Victor was cardinal-bishop of Frascati 1139–1140/41 but Brixius, pp. 91–92 indicates that he should be eliminated from that list.)
  - Teobaldo (1162), pseudocardinal
- Ugo Pierleoni (1166)
  - Martino (or Marino) (1167–1174/78), pseudocardinal
- Odon de Soissons (1170–1171)
- Pietro da Pavia (1179—1182)

=== 1200–1400 ===
==== Bishops of Frascati ====
- Nicola de Romanis (1204–1219)
- Nicola de Chiaromonte (or Chiaramonti), Cistercian (1219–1227)
- Jacques de Vitry (1229–1240)
- Odo of Châteauroux, Cistercian (1244–1273)
- João Pedro Julião (1273–1276)
- Ordonho Alvares, Ordonius (1278–1285)
- Giovanni Boccamazza (1285–1309)
- Bérenger Frédol (1309–1323)
- Bertrand Augier de la Tour (1323–1332 or 1333)
- Annibale di Ceccano (1333–1350)
- Guillaume Court (1351–1361)
- Nicola Capocci (1361–1368)
- Gilles Aycelin de Montaigu (1368–1378)
- Thomas of Frignano (1378–1381)
- Guillaume de Chanac (1383), appointed by Clement VII of the obedience of Avignon
- Pietro Pileo di Prata (1385–1387 and again 1391–1401)
- Jean Rolland (1385–1388), appointed by Clement VII of the obedience of Avignon
- Jean de La Grange (before 1394–1402), appointed by Clement VII of the obedience of Avignon

=== 1400–1600 ===
- Enrico Minutoli (1405–1409)
- Pierre Girard (Note: Girard was created a cardinal by Pope Clement VII of the Avignon Obedience on 17 October 1390, and assigned the titular church of San Pietro in Vincoli. On 13 June 1405 he was promoted to the See of Tusculum (Frascati) by Pope Benedict XIII of the Avignon Obedience. He participated with most of the cardinals of the Avignon and the Roman Obediences in the Council of Pisa and the election of Pope Alexander V. He was Major Penitentiary. He died on 9 November 1415. Eubel, I, p. 28.) (1402–1415)
- Angelo Corraro (1415–1417)
- Baldassare Cossa (1419)
- Antonio Panciera (1431)
- Hugues de Lusignan (1436–1442)
- Louis II de Luxembourg (1442–1443)
- Giuliano Cesarini (1444)
- Bessarion (1449–1468)
- Latino Orsini (1468–1477)
- Giacomo Ammannati-Piccolomini (1477–1479)
- Giovanni Battista Zeno (1479–1501)
- Jorge da Costa (1501–1503)
- Lorenzo Cybo de Mari (1503)
- Antonio Pallavicini (1503–1505)
- Giovanni Antonio Sangiorgio (1505–1507)
- Bernardino López de Carvajal (1507–1508)
- Guillaume Briçonnet (1508–1509)
- Domenico Grimani (1509–1511)
- Philippe de Luxembourg (1511–1519)
- Alessandro Farnese (1519–1523)
- François Guillaume de Castelnau-Clermont-Ludève (1523–1541)
- Marino Grimani (1541–1543)
- Philippe de la Chambre (1543–1550)
- Gian Pietro Carafa (1550–1553)
- Jean du Bellay (1553–1555)
- Rodolfo Pio (1553–1555)
- Juan Álvarez de Toledo (1555–1557)
- Francesco Pisani (1557–1562)
- Federico Cesi (1562 or 1562–1564)
- Giovanni Girolamo Morone (1562–1565)
- Alessandro Farnese the younger (1565–1578)
- Giacomo Savelli (1578–1583)
- Giovanni Antonio Serbelloni (1583–1587)
- Alfonso Gesualdo (1587–1589)
- Innico d'Avalos d'Aragona (1589–1591)
- Tolomeo Gallio (1591–1600)

=== 1600–1800 ===
- Ludovico Madruzzo (1600)
- Girolamo Simoncelli (1600–1603)
- Domenico Pinelli (1603–1605)
- Antonio Maria Galli (1605–1608)
- Mariano Pierbenedetti (1608–1611)
- Giovanni Evangelista Pallotta (1611–1620)
- Francesco Sforza di Santa Fiora (1620–1624)
- Odoardo Farnese (1624–1626)
- Giovanni Battista Deti (1626)
- Bonifazio Bevilacqua Aldobrandini (1626–1627)
- Andrea Baroni Peretti Montalto (1627–1629)
- Giovanni Garzia Millini (1629)
- Marcello Lante della Rovere (1629–1639)
- Giulio Savelli (1639–1644)
- Giulio Roma (1644–1645)
- Carlo de' Medici (1645–1652)
- Giulio Cesare Sacchetti (1652–1655)
- Antonio Barberini (1655–1661)
- Girolamo Colonna (1661–1666)
- Giovanni Battista Maria Pallotta (1666–1668)
- Francesco Maria Brancaccio (1668–1671)
- Ulderico Carpegna (1671–1675)
- Virginio Orsini (1675–1676)
- Carlo Rossetti (1676–1680)
- Alderano Cybo (1680–1683)
- Pietro Vito Ottoboni (1683–1687)
- Giacomo Franzoni (1687–1693)
- Nicolò Acciaioli (1693–1701)
- Sebastiano Antonio Tanara (1715–1721)
- Francesco del Giudice (1721–1724)
- Francesco Pignatelli (1724–1725)
- Lorenzo Corsini (1725–1730)
- Pietro Ottoboni (1730–1734)
- Pier Marcellino Corradini (1734–1743)
- Giuseppe Accoramboni (1743–1747)
- Vincenzo Bichi (1747–1750)
- Giovanni Antonio Guadagni (1750–1756)
- Carlo Maria Sacripante (1756–1758)
- Camillo Paolucci (1758–1761)
- Henry Benedict Stuart (1761–1803)

=== From 1800 ===
- Giuseppe Doria Pamphili (1803–1814)
- Giulio Maria della Somaglia (1814–1818)
- Bartolomeo Pacca (1818–1821)
- Francesco Saverio Castiglioni (1821–1829)
- Emmanuele de Gregorio (1829–1837)
- Ludovico Micara (1837–1844)
- Mario Mattei (1844–1854)
- Antonio Maria Cagiano de Azevedo (1854–1867)
- Niccola Paracciani Clarelli (1867–1872)
- Filippo Maria Guidi (1872–1879)
- Jean Baptiste François Pitra (1879–1884)
- Edward Henry Howard (1884–1892)
- Tommaso Maria Zigliara (1893)

=== From 1900 ===
- Serafino Vannutelli (1893–1903)
- Francesco di Paola Satolli (1903–1910)
- Francesco di Paola Cassetta (1911–1919)
- Giulio Boschi (1919–1920)
- Giovanni Cagliero, Salesiani di Don Bosco (1920–1926)
- Michele Lega (1926–1935)
- Francesco Marchetti Selvaggiani (1936–1951)
- Federico Tedeschini (1951–1959)
- Gaetano Cicognani (1959–1962)

=== From 1962 ===
Titular Cardinal-Bishops

- Amleto Giovanni Cicognani (1962–1973)
- Jean-Marie Villot (1974–1979)
- Paolo Bertoli (1979–2001)
- Alfonso López Trujillo (2001–2008)
- Tarcisio Bertone (2008– )

Bishops of Frascati

- Luigi Liverzani (1962–1989)
- Giuseppe Matarrese (1989–2009)
- Raffaello Martinelli (2009–2023)
- Stefano Russo (2023– )

== Auxiliary bishops ==
- Marco Antonio Bottoni, T.O.R. (1655–?)
- Biagio Budelacci (1936–1962)
- Francesco Giacci (1900–1904)
- Edward Henry Howard (1872–?)

== Books ==
- Bräuer, Martin (2014). Handbuch der Kardinäle: 1846-2012 (in German). Berlin: De Gruyter. ISBN 978-3-11-026947-5.
- Eubel, Conradus, ed. (1913). Hierarchia catholica, Tomus 1 (second ed.). Münster: Libreria Regensbergiana. (in Latin)
- Eubel, Conradus, ed. (1914). Hierarchia catholica, Tomus 2 (second ed.). Münster: Libreria Regensbergiana. (in Latin)
- Konrad Eubel; Wilhelm van Gulik; Stefan Ehses; Patrick Gauchat; Remigius Ritzler; Pirmin Sefrin, eds. (1923). Hierarchia catholica, Tomus 3 (second ed.). Münster: Libreria Regensbergiana. (in Latin)
- Gams, Pius Bonifatius (1873). Series episcoporum Ecclesiae catholicae: quotquot innotuerunt a beato Petro apostolo (in Latin). Ratisbon: Typis et Sumptibus Georgii Josephi Manz. pp. xix–xxii.
- Gauchat, Patritius (Patrice) (1935). Hierarchia catholica IV (1592-1667). Münster: Libraria Regensbergiana. (in Latin)
- Lentz, Harris M. (2009). Popes and Cardinals of the 20th Century: A Biographical Dictionary. Jefferson NC USA: McFarland. ISBN 978-1-4766-2155-5.
- Ritzler, Remigius; Sefrin, Pirminus (1952). Hierarchia catholica medii et recentis aevi V (1667-1730). Patavii: Messagero di S. Antonio. (in Latin)
- Ritzler, Remigius; Sefrin, Pirminus (1958). Hierarchia catholica medii et recentis aevi VI (1730-1799). Patavii: Messagero di S. Antonio. (in Latin)

=== Studies ===
- Digard, Georges (1902). La Fin de la seigneurie de Tusculum (in French). Paris: A. Picard et fils.
- Duchesne, Louis (1892). Le Liber Pontificalis (in Latin and French). Vol. Tome second. Paris: E. Thorin.
- Lugari, Giovanni Battista (1891). L' origine di Frascati e la distruzione del Tuscolo (in Italian). Cuggiani.
- Mattei, Domenico Barnaba (1711). Memorie istoriche dell' antico Tusculo oggi Frascati (in Italian). Roma: Buagni.
- Razza, Leonello (1979). La Basilica Cattedrale di Frascati (in Italian). Frascati: Associazione Tuscolana "Amici di Frascati".
- Toffanello, Giuseppe (1966). Frascati: civitas tusculana (in Italian). Edizioni Tuscolo.
