= Campeggi =

Campeggi is a surname. Notable people with the surname include:

- Filippo Maria Campeggi (1512–1584), Italian Roman Catholic bishop
- Lorenzo Campeggi (d. 1639), Italian Roman Catholic bishop
- Marco Antonio Campeggi (d. 1553), Italian Roman Catholic bishop
- Silvano Campeggi (1923–2018), Italian artist
