= Simeone Difnico =

- Bishop of Feltre
- Church: Catholic Church
- See: Bishop of Feltre
- Appointed: 10 May 1649
- Term ended: 24 May 1661
- Predecessor: Zerbino Lugo
- Successor: Marco Marchiani
- Other post: Bishop of Nin

Orders
- Consecration: 17 March 1647 (Bishop) by Scipione Pannocchieschi d'Elci

Personal details
- Born: 12 September 1613 Šibenik, Venetian Republic
- Died: 24 May 1661 (aged 47) Bassano del Grappa, Venetian Republic

Simeone Difnico (Italian: Simeone Difnico, Croatian: Šimun Divnić, Latin: Simeon Diphnicus, c. 1613 – 1661) was bishop of Nin during the Cretan War from 1646 to 1649, and bishop of Feltre from 1649 to 1661.

== Bishop of Nin ==
Simeone Difnico was born in Šibenik on 12 September 1613 to the important Divnić family of that town. He graduated in utroque iure at the University of Padua on 10 May 1634. The Venetian bishop of Šibenik, Alvise Marcello, chose him as general vicar, and later supported him to become bishop of Nin. On 25 June 1646 Simeone Difnico was so appointed by Pope Innocent X. Therefore, on Sunday 17 March 1647 he was consecrated bishop in the Venetian church of Santa Maria Gloriosa dei Frari by the Nuncio in Venice, Scipione Pannocchieschi d'Elci.

In Nin Simeone Difnico started to restore the Cathedral and to tried to settle a conflict about tithes with the near Diocese of Zadar. His episcopate occurred during the first phase of the Cretan War (1645–1669) which was fought also in Dalmatia: the town of Nin was destroyed in 1647 and the population evacuated in the near Zadar, where Simeone succeeded in securing the furnishings and liturgical books.

== Bishop of Feltre ==
On 10 May 1649 Simeone Difnico was appointed bishop of Feltre, a town near Dolomites mountains governed by the Republic of Venice. Because his authoritarian attitude and his love for the pageantry, he was not loved by the local population. He entered in conflict with the local friars and nuns, for example in 1649 he forbade the franciscan friars of Borgo Valsugana to confess at Christmas up to next Easter.

His main conflicts were however against the local feudatories, who no more recognized the Bishop as own Lord, refusing to pay to the Church the tithe and on the contrary imposing their taxes. The main of these feudatories was Ferdinand Charles, Archduke of Austria. Simeone Difnico appealed to the Doge of Venice to intervene, but without success. This conflict had a negative impact on the local population: for example, in the argument about who had the right to appoint the parish priest of Strigno, Simone Difnico launched the interdict on that little town, and so no religious ceremonies were there celebrated from 6 January 1650 to 13 February 1652.

Simone Difnico used to stay away from his diocese for long periods. After the complaints for this reason, Difnico returned in his diocese residing in the castle of Castellalto near Telve, where he got ill. He moved to Bassano del Grappa to look after himself, and there he died on 24 May 1661. He was buried in the local church of Beatissima Vergine della Misericordia.
