= Philippe de Luxembourg =

French cardinal and bishop

- Cardinal-Bishop of Frascati
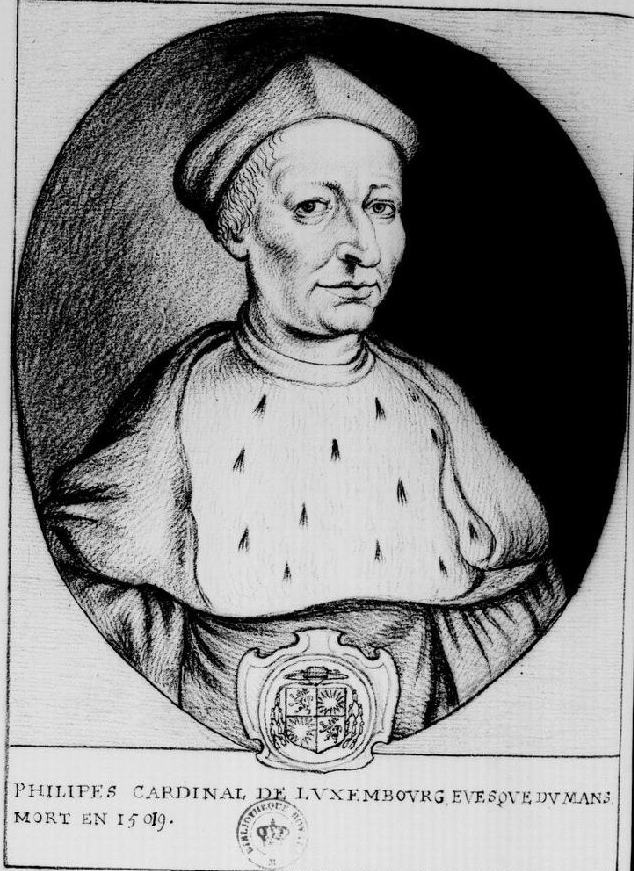
- Church: Catholic Church
- Diocese: Suburbicarian Diocese of Frascati
- In office: 20 January 1511 – 2 June 1519
- Predecessor: Domenico Grimani
- Successor: Alessandro Farnese
- Previous posts: Bishop of Le Mans (1476-1507, 1509-1519); Bishop of Arras (1516-1518); Bishop of Thérouanne (1498-1516); Bishop of Saint-Pons-de-Thomières (1509-1511); Cardinal-Bishop of Albano (1509-1511); Cardinal-Priest of Santi Marcellino e Pietro (1495-1509)

Orders
- Created cardinal: 21 January 1495 by Pope Alexander VI

Personal details
- Born: 1445
- Died: 2 June 1519 (aged 73–74) Le Mans, Maine, Kingdom of France

Philippe de Luxembourg (1445 – 2 June 1519) was a French cardinal and bishop.

== Life ==
He was bishop of Le Mans in 1476. He was bishop of Thérouanne 1496 to 1513, and bishop of Saint-Pons in 1509, when his nephew died, and until 1512, when he resigned in favour of François-Guillaume de Castelnau de Clermont-Lodève. He was abbot at the abbey of Jumièges in 1510.

He was a judge at the 1498 divorce trial of King Louis XII and Queen Joan of France. He was named papal legate to France on 18 August 1516.

== Family ==
His father was Cardinal Thibaud de Luxembourg.
