= Giuseppe Matarrese =

Italian priest (1934–2020)

- Bishop of Frascati
- Church: Catholic Church
- Diocese: Suburbicarian Diocese of Frascati
- In office: 11 November 1989 – 2 July 2009
- Predecessor: Luigi Liverzani
- Successor: Raffaello Martinelli

Orders
- Ordination: 15 March 1959
- Consecration: 16 December 1989 by Ugo Poletti

Personal details
- Born: 3 June 1934 Andria, Province of Bari, Kingdom of Italy
- Died: 27 June 2020 (aged 86) Frascati, Lazio, Italy

Giuseppe Matarrese (3 June 1934 – 27 June 2020) was an Italian Roman Catholic bishop.

Matarrese was born in Italy and was ordained to the priesthood in 1959. He served as bishop of the Roman Catholic Suburbicarian Diocese of Frascati, Italy, from 1989 to 2009.

Matarrese died on 27 June 2020, aged 86.
