= Filippo Maria Campeggi =

16th-century Roman Catholic bishop

Most Reverend Filippo Maria Campeggi
- Bishop of Feltre
- Church: Catholic Church
- Diocese: Diocese of Feltre
- In office: 1559–1584
- Predecessor: Tomaso Campeggi
- Successor: Giacomo Rovello

Orders
- Consecration: 30 Jul 1559 by Giovanni Campeggi

Personal details
- Born: 1512 Bologna, Italy
- Died: 9 April 1584 (aged 71–72) Feltre, Italy

Filippo Maria Campeggi (1512–1584) was a Roman Catholic prelate who served as Bishop of Feltre (1559–1584).

== Biography ==
Filippo Maria Campeggi was born in 1512 in Bologna, Italy. On 16 Apr 1546, he was appointed during the papacy of Pope Paul III as Coadjutor Bishop of Feltre. On 17 Apr 1559, he succeeded to the bishopric. On 30 Jul 1559, he was consecrated bishop by Giovanni Campeggi, Bishop of Bologna, with Pierdonato Cesi (seniore), Bishop of Narni, and Salvatore Pacini, Bishop of Chiusi, serving as co-consecrators. He served as Bishop of Feltre until his death on 9 Apr 1584 in Feltre, Italy.

== External links and additional sources ==
- Cheney, David M. "Diocese of Feltre". Catholic-Hierarchy.org. (for Chronology of Bishops) ^{[self-published]}
- Chow, Gabriel. "Diocese of Feltre (Italy)". GCatholic.org. (for Chronology of Bishops) ^{[self-published]}

Catholic Church titles
Preceded by Tomaso Campeggi	Bishop of Feltre; 1559–1584	Succeeded by Giacomo Rovello
