= Marino Grimani (cardinal) =

Italian Cardinal and papal legate

- Titular Patriarch of Constantinople
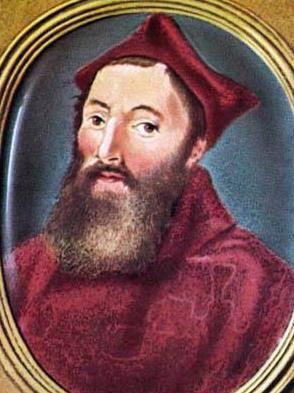
- Church: Catholic Church
- In office: 23 March 1545 – 28 September 1546
- Predecessor: Francesco Pesaro
- Successor: Ranuccio Farnese
- Other post: Cardinal-Bishop of Porto and Santa Rufina (1543-1546)
- Previous posts: Administrator of Ceneda (1531-1540); Cardinal-Bishop of Frascati (1541-1543); Cardinal-Priest of Santa Maria in Trastevere (1539-1541); Administrator of Città di Castello (1934-1939); Cardinal-Priest of San Marcello (1532-1539); Administrator of Concordia (1533-1537); Administrator of Saint-Pons-de-Thomières (1534); Cardinal-Priest of San Vitale (1528-1532); Patriarch of Aquileia (1517-1529); Bishop of Ceneda (1508-1517)

Orders
- Created cardinal: 3 May 1527 by Pope Clement VII

Personal details
- Born: c. 1488 Venice, Most Serene Republic of Venice
- Died: 28 September 1546 (aged 57–58) Orvieto, Papal States

Marino Grimani (c. 1489–1546) was an Italian Cardinal and papal legate. He was from an aristocratic Venetian family.

He was elected bishop of Ceneda in 1508, when he was underage. He was patriarch of Aquileia in 1517.

He was created a Cardinal in 1527. He was bishop of Concordia in 1533, bishop of Città Castello in 1534, bishop of Saint Pons de Tomières, briefly, in 1534. He was bishop of Frascati in 1541, bishop of Porto e Santa Rufina in 1543.
