= Diocese of Feltre =

The Italian Catholic diocese of Feltre, in the Veneto existed from 1462 to 1818. It was then united into the diocese of Belluno e Feltre. It had previously had an independent existence, up to 1197.

== History ==
The first Bishop of Feltre whose date can be fixed is Fonteius, who in 579 took part in a council in Aquileia and in 591 dedicated a book to Emperor Mauritius. Drudo of Camino (1174) was the first bishop of the united sees of Belluno and Feltre, the latter being their residence of the bishop. The twelfth, thirteenth, and fourteenth centuries were filled with civil strife.

In 1462, at the request of the Venetian Republic, the two dioceses were separated. Among the Bishops of Feltre after the separation were:

- Teodoro Lelio (1462), papal publicist and nuncio;
- Angelo Faseolo (1464), who was appointed on many legations in connection with the Crusade against the Turks;
- Lorenzo Campeggio (1512), nuncio to England during the time of Henry VIII, later made cardinal and transferred (1520) to Bologna.
- His nephew Tommaso Campeggio, who was nuncio several times.
- Agostino Gradenigo (1610);
- Zerbino Lugo (1640);
- Giovanni Bortoli (1748), professor of canon law at Padua.

== Bishops of Feltre ==
Separated 1462 from the Diocese of Belluno e Feltre
Latin Name: Feltrensis
Metropolitan: Patriarchate of Venice

- Teodoro de Lellis (1462–1464 Appointed, Bishop of Treviso)
- Angelo Fasolo (1464–1490 Died)
- Giovanni Robobello (1491–1494 Appointed, Archbishop of Zadar)
- Andrea Trevisano (1494–1504 Died)
- Antonio Pizzamano (1504–1512 Died)
- Lorenzo Campeggio (1512–1520 Resigned)
- Tomaso Campeggi (1520–1559 Resigned)
- Filippo Maria Campeggi (1559–1584 Died)
- Jacopo Roveglio (Rovelli) (1584–1610 Died)
- Agostino Gradenigo (1610–1628 Succeeded, Patriarch of Aquileia)
- Giovanni Paolo Savio (1628–1639 Appointed, Bishop of Adria)
- Zerbino Lugo (1640–1647 Died)
- Simeone Difnico (1649–1661 Died)
- Marco Marchiani (1662–1663 Died)
- Bartolomeo Gera (Giera) (1664–1681 Died)
- Antonio Polcenigo (1684–1724 Died)
- Pietro Maria Suárez (1724–1747 Appointed, Bishop of Adria)
- Giovanni Battista Bortoli (1747–1757 Resigned)
- Andrea Antonio Silverio Minucci (1757–1777 Appointed, Bishop of Rimini)
- Girolamo Enrico Beltramini-Miazzi (1777–1779 Died)
- Andrea Benedetto Ganassoni, O.S.B. (1779–1786 Died)
- Bernardo Maria (Hercules Antonio Vincent) Carenzoni, O.S.B. (1786–1811 Died)

United on 1 May 1818 with the Diocese of Belluno to form the Diocese of Belluno e Feltre

== See also ==
- Catholic Church in Italy
