= Michele di Pietro =

Papalini Catholic prelate

His Eminence Michele di Pietro
- Major Penitentiary of the Apostolic Penitentiary
- Church: Roman Catholic Church
- Appointed: 20 May 1814
- Term ended: 7 July 1821
- Predecessor: Leonardo Antonelli
- Successor: Francesco Saverio Castiglione
- Other posts: Prefect of the Congregation of the Index (1818–21); Cardinal-Bishop of Porto e Santa Rufina (1820–21); Vice-Dean of the College of Cardinals (1820–21)
- Previous posts: Titular Bishop of Isaura (1794–1800); Patriarch of Jerusalem (1800–16); Cardinal-Priest of Santa Maria in Via (1802–16); Pro-Prefect of the Congregation for the Propagation of the Faith (1805–14); Cardinal-Bishop of Albano (1816–20)

Orders
- Ordination: 28 October 1771
- Consecration: 24 February 1794 by Henry Benedict Mary Clement Stuart
- Created cardinal: 23 February 1801 (in pectore); 9 August 1802 (revealed) by Pope Pius VII
- Rank: Cardinal-Priest (1802–16); Cardinal-Bishop (1816–21)

Personal details
- Born: Michele di Pietro; 18 January 1747 Albano Laziale, Papal States
- Died: 2 July 1821 (aged 74) Rome, Papal States
- Buried: Albano Cathedral
- Education: Collegio Romano; La Sapienza

Styles of Michele di Pietro
- Reference style: His Eminence
- Spoken style: Your Eminence
- Informal style: Cardinal
- See: Albano Porto-Santa-Rufina (suburbicarian see)

Michele di Pietro (18 January 1747 – 2 July 1821) was an Papalini Catholic prelate who served as Major Penitentiary of the Apostolic Penitentiary and as Prefect of the Congregation of Propaganda Fide. He was elevated to the cardinalate in 1801. He was an uncle of Cardinal Camillo di Pietro.

== Biography ==
Michele di Pietro was born in Albano Laziale, outside Rome. He was educated at the Seminary of Albano, and the La Sapienza University in Rome, where he received a doctorate in utroque iure (in both canon and civil law) on 4 June 1768.

He was ordained on 28 October 1771. He served as a Professor of civil and canon law at the University of Rome and as a lecturer of theology at the Pontifical Gregorian University. He also served as a consultor of the Congregation of the Roman and Universal Inquisition and of the Congregation of the Index. It was around this time he was created Privy chamberlain of His Holiness.

He was appointed as titular bishop of Isauriopoli on 21 February 1794 by Pope Pius VI. He was consecrated three days later in Frascati, by Cardinal Henry Benedict Stuart. He served as Apostolic delegate of Rome while there was no Vicar-General for 1798. He was promoted to the Latin Patriarch of Jerusalem on 22 December 1800.

He was created and proclaimed Cardinal-Priest of Santa Maria in Via, but only in pectore, in the consistory of 23 February 1801. This was published in the consistory of 9 August 1802. He was appointed Prefect of the Congregation of Propaganda Fide on 24 May 1805, in addition to his duties in Jerusalem. He held the post until 20 May 1814. He was taken to France together with Cardinal Ercole Consalvi in December 1809 and banished to Semur-en-Auxois for not attending Napoleon's wedding with Maria Louise. He was imprisoned in the fortress of Vincennes at the end of 1810 for sending the papal order to the clergy of Paris not to recognise Jean-Siffrein Maury as Archbishop of Paris. He was appointed Major Penitentiary of the Apostolic Penitentiary ad interim in 1811, holding the post until 1814. He was freed in January 1813, and arrested again in April. He was considered responsible, together with Bartolomeo Pacca, for Pope Pius VII's retraction of his agreement with Napoleon. One of the most distinguished "black cardinals" (prohibited by Napoleon to wear red cardinalitial habit). He was made full Major Penitentiary in 1814. He opted for the order of bishops and the suburbicarian see of Albano in 1816. He was appointed Prefect of the Congregation of the Index in 1818. He opted for the suburbicarian see of Porto e Santa Rufina in 1820. He died in July 1821. His funeral took place on 5 July 1821 and he is buried in the cathedral of Albano.

Catholic Church titles
Preceded by Georgius Maria Lascaris	Patriarch of Jerusalem; 22 December 1800 – 2 July 1821	Succeeded by Francesco Maria Fenzi
Preceded by Antonio Dugnani	Prefect of the Congregation of Propaganda Fide; 24 May 1805 – 20 May 1814	Succeeded by Lorenzo Litta
Preceded by Leonardo Antonelli	Major Penitentiary of the Apostolic Penitentiary; 20 May 1814 – 2 July 1821	Succeeded by Francesco Saverio Castiglioni
Preceded by Luigi Valenti Gonzaga	Cardinal-Bishop of Albano; 8 March 1816 – 29 May 1820	Succeeded by Pietro Francesco Galeffi
Preceded by Giulio Maria della Somaglia	Cardinal-Bishop of Porto-Santa-Rufina; 29 May 1820 – 2 July 1821	Succeeded by Bartolomeo Pacca
