= Micara =

Micara is a surname of Italian origin. Notable people with the surname include:

- Clemente Micara (1879–1965), Italian Cardinal of the Catholic Church
- Ludovico Micara (1775–1847), Italian Capuchin and Cardinal

== See also ==
- Scopula micara, moth of the family Geometridae
