= Astalli =

Astalli is an Italian surname. Notable people with the surname include:

- Camillo Astalli (1616–1663), Italian Catholic Cardinal
- Fulvio Astalli (1655–1721), Italian Catholic Cardinal and Bishop
