= Suburbicarian Diocese of Porto–Santa Rufina =

Roman Catholic diocese in Rome, Italy

Coordinates: 42.5356°N 12.3783°E

Suburbicarian Diocese of Porto–Santa Rufina Portuensis–Sanctae Rufinae

Catholic
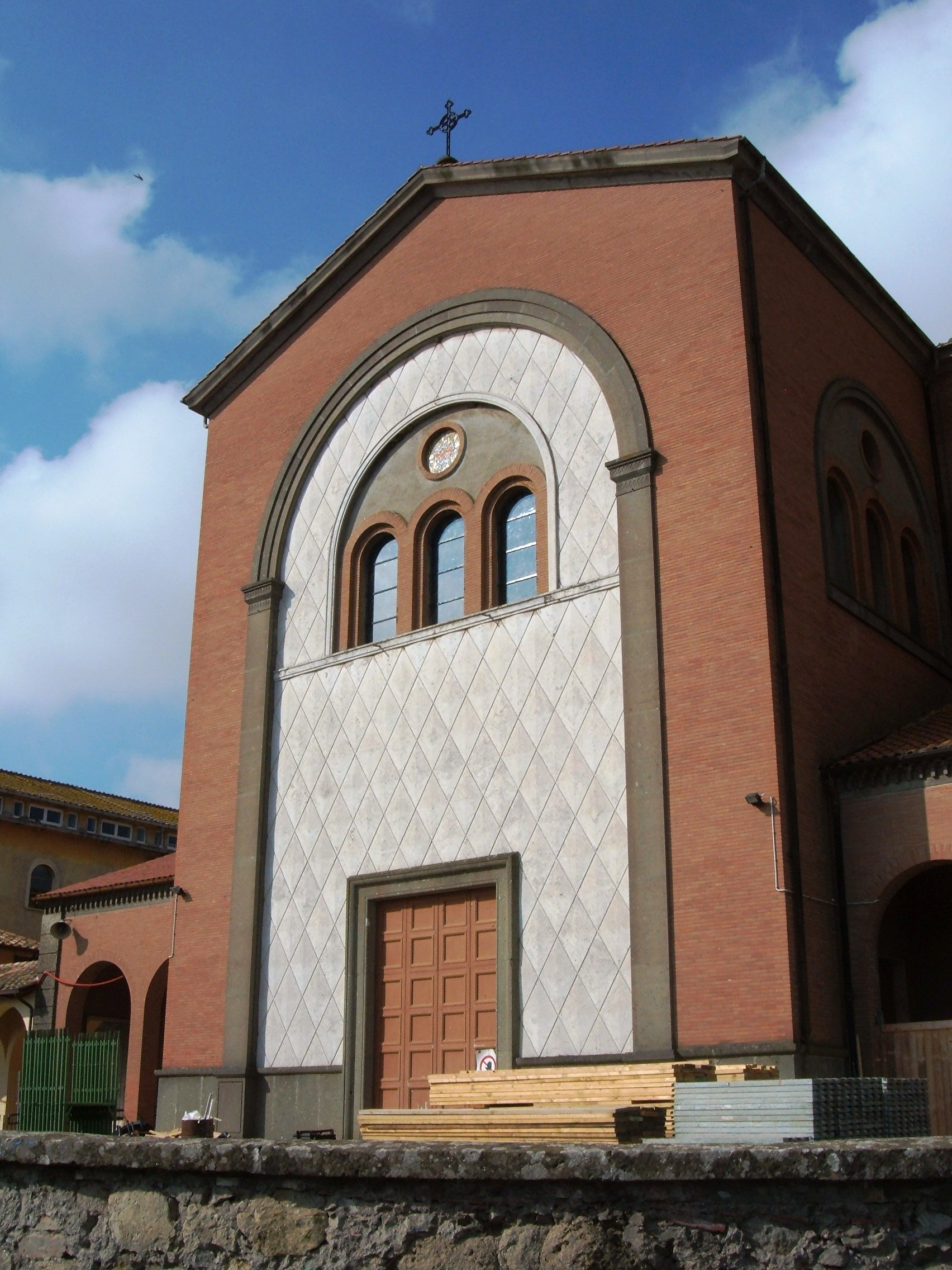
- La Storta (Roma) Cathedral

Location
- Country: Italy
- Ecclesiastical province: Rome

Statistics
- Area: 2,000 km^{2} (770 sq mi)
- Population: Total; Catholics: (as of 2019); 437,000 (est.); 386,000 (est.) (88%)
- Parishes: 56

Information
- Denomination: Catholic Church
- Sui iuris church: Latin Church
- Rite: Roman Rite
- Established: 3rd century
- Cathedral: Cattedrale dei Sacri Cuori di Gesù e Maria (La Storta)
- Co-cathedral: Chiesa di SS. Ippolito e Lucia (Portus)
- Secular priests: 67 (diocesan); 81 (Religious Orders); 11 Permanent Deacons

Current leadership
- Pope: Leo XIV
- Bishop: Beniamino Stella (Cardinal-bishop); Gianrico Ruzza (Diocesan bishop)
- Bishops emeritus: Gino Reali

Map
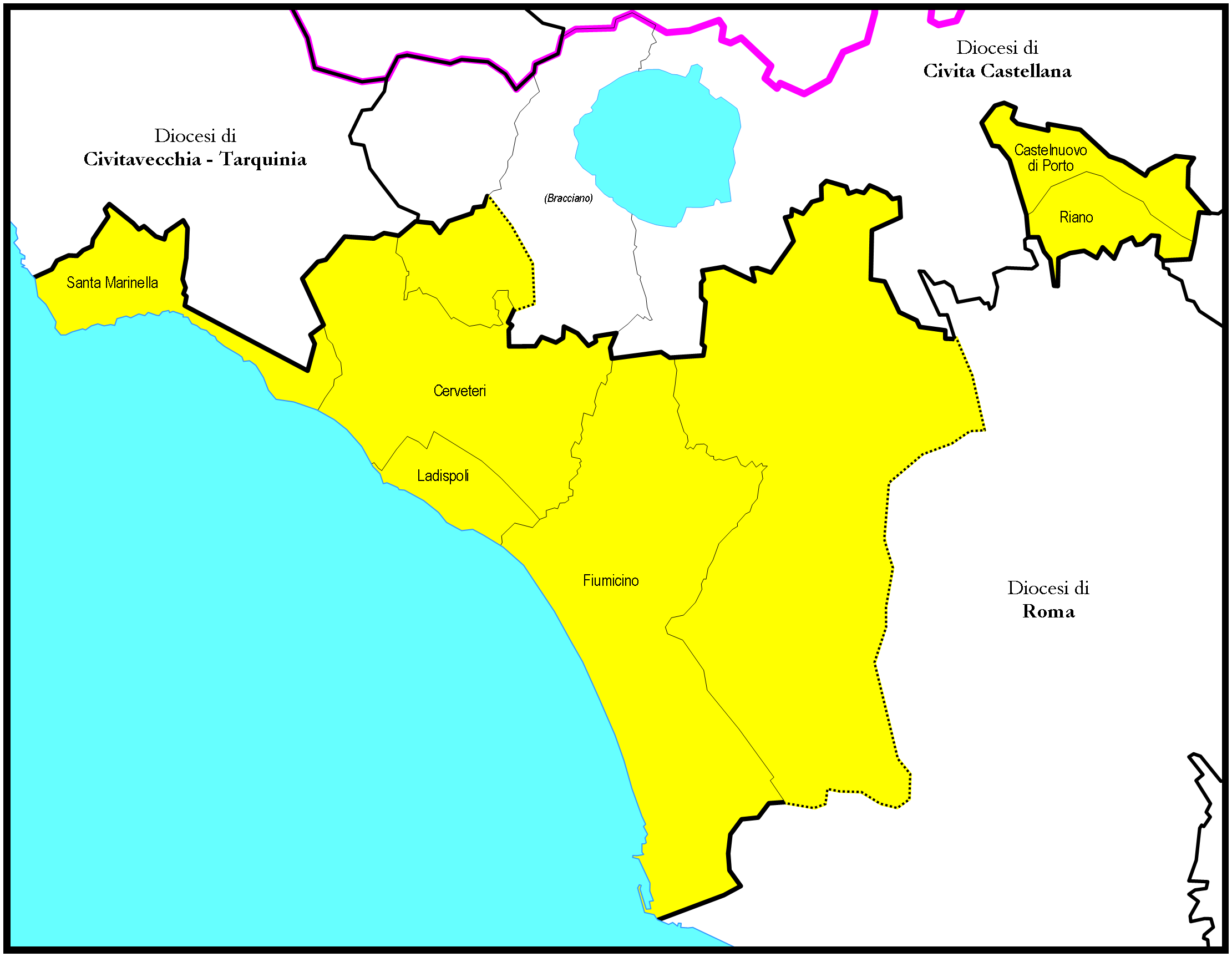

Website
- diocesiportosantarufina.it

The Diocese of Porto–Santa Rufina is a Latin suburbicarian diocese of the Diocese of Rome and a diocese of the Catholic Church in Italy. It was formed from the union of two dioceses. The diocese of Santa Rufina was also formerly known as Silva Candida.

From 1967, the diocese has had both a titular cardinal bishop, and a resident bishop who handles the diocesan business.

== History ==
=== Early Christian history of Porto ===
Porto was in ancient times Portus, the chief harbour of Rome. It owes its origin to the port built by Claudius on the right of the Tiber, opposite Ostia. Trajan enlarged the basin, and in a short time there grew around it a city which eventually became independent of Ostia. Porto became a separate city in the 4th century. Between 337 and 341, a statue was erected by the ordo et populus civitatis Flaviae Constantinianae Portuensis.

It was near Porto that Julius Nepos compelled Emperor Glycerius to abdicate (474). During the Gothic War the town served the Goths (537 and 549) and the Byzantines (546–552) as a base of operations against Rome. In the 9th and 10th centuries it was sacked on several occasions by the Saracens. In 849 Pope Leo IV fortified it and established there a colony of Corsicans for the defence of the coast and the neighbouring territory, but the city continued to decay.

Christianity was early established there. Several martyrs of Porto are known, including Herculanus, Hyacinthus, Martialis, Saturninus Epictetus, Maprilis and Felix. The place was also famous as the probable see of St. Hippolytus (1st half on third century).

In 314 Gregorius was bishop. The great xenodochium, or hospice, of Pammachius was built about 398.

In 682, it is recorded that Pope Leo II was consecrated by the bishops of Ostia, Porto and Velletri (the See of Albano being vacant). The bishop of Porto was one of the seven (then six, when Porto was combined with Santa Rufina) episcopi hebdomadarii, who presided at the high altar of the Lateran Basilica in rotation during the weekdays; the system is first mentioned at the time of Pope Stephen III (768–772), though it was certainly much older.

On 1 August 1018, Pope Benedict VIII confirmed for Bishop Benedictus all the possessions of the church of Porto, which were named in detail and included not only the entire city of Porto, but also the Isola Lycaonia and the island with the church of S. Bartholomew, and the Transtiberine region of Rome; the grant included the complete rights over people's estates who died in his jurisdiction without an heir, or intestate, or involved in a legal situation.

=== Diocese of Caere ===
The Diocese of Cære, now Cerveteri, has been united with that of Porto since the 12th century. Cære was an ancient city, called at first Agylla, where the sanctuaries of Rome and the Vestals were hidden during the invasion of the Gauls; the Etruscan tombs scattered about its territory are important archeologically. Cervetri had bishops of its own until the 11th century. The earliest known was Adeodatus, who participated in the first Roman synod of Pope Symmachus in 499. Bishop Petrus attended Pope Paul I's synod of 761; Bishop Romanus was present at Pope Eugenius II's synod of 826; other known bishops were Adrianus (853), Crescentius (869), Annisus (995), and Stephanus (1000). The last known was Benedictus, who is recorded in 1015 and 1029.

=== Early Christian history of Santa Rufina ===
Santa Rufina grew up around the basilica of the Holy Martyrs Sts. Rufina and Secunda on the Via Aurelia, fourteen miles (23 km) from Rome; the basilica is said to have been begun by Pope Julius I, and was finished by Saint Damasus. In the 9th century this town was destroyed by the Saracens, and the efforts of Pope Leo IV and Pope Sergius III were unable to save it from total ruin: all that remains are the remnants of the ancient basilica and a chapel.

The residence of the bishops of Silva Candida was on the Insula Tiberina beside the church of Sts. Adalbert and Paulinus, while that of the bishops of Porto was on the same island near the church of San Giovanni. The bishops of Silva Candida, moreover, enjoyed great prerogatives in relation with the ceremonies of the basilica of St. Peter. In November 1037, Bishop Petrus and all his successors were granted the office of Bibliothecarius (Librarian) of the Holy Roman Church.

The first notice of it as an episcopal see dates from the 5th century:

During the schism of antipope Clement III (Wibert of Ravenna), there was a schismatic bishop Adalbert (1084–1102), who became antipope Adalbert (1102). He was captured, brought before Pope Paschal II, and sent to the monastery of S. Lorenzo in Aversa.

Pope Callistus II (1119–1124) united to the See of Porto the other suburbicarian See of Silva Candida or Santa Rufina. The act was confirmed by Pope Adrian IV, and by Pope Gregory IX. The change is dated to 1119 by Giuseppe Cappelletti.

Historically, the Bishop of Porto became the second cardinal in terms of prestige, the Bishop of Ostia being the first, and officiated on Mondays in the Lateran Basilica; he obtained, moreover, the other rights of the Bishop of Santa Rufina, but lost jurisdiction over the Leonine City and its environs, when they were united to the city of Rome.

=== Recent history ===
In 1826, Civitavecchia was separated from the Diocese of Viterbo and Toscanella and united with that of Porto, by Pope Leo XII. In 1854, it was made an independent see, but sharing a bishop with Corneto (Tarquinia) as the bishop of Tarquinia e Civitavecchia. In 1986, the two dioceses were united, becoming the Dioecesis Centumcellarum-Tarquiniensis, with its seat at Civitavecchia. The Cardinal Bishop of Porto Luigi Lambruschini (1847) restored the cathedral and the episcopal palace.

From the 16th century, the incumbency of prelates of the see of Porto was, as a rule, of short duration, because most of the cardinal bishops opted for the See of Ostia and Velletri when it became vacant. It was necessary, however, to be present at the consistory in which vacancies were being filled and cardinals could opt for Ostia in order of seniority. On 10 March 1961, in the apostolic letter Ad suburbicarias dioeceses, Pope John XXIII abolished the right of cardinal bishops to opt for other suburbicarian sees, reserving the right of appointment to the pope.

By the beginning of the 20th century, it had become apparent that the suburbicarian bishops had become overburdened with the responsibilities of their curial and diocesan duties. The increase in commerce, in roads and travel, and migration to the city, as well as the increased burden of duties in the papal administration because of the number and complexity of problems affecting the Church, made some sort of relief necessary. Pope Pius X issued a decree, Apostolicae Romanorum Pontificium, granting the bishops of Ostia, Porto, Albano. Palestrina, and Frascati each a suffragan bishop to carry the burden of their pastoral duties in their dioceses. The pope appointed the suffragans, who had full powers inside the diocese, subject to the cardinal's approval, but not the power to ordain or consecrate, or the right to have a throne or display their coat-of-arms. Further details were added by Pope John XXIII in his apostolic letter, Suburbicariis sedibus, defining the suffragan bishop as "Episcopus Ordinarius", with the same powers as other residential bishops, and enumerating the privileges of the cardinal bishop.

In 1914, Pope Pius X took steps to restrain the irregularities in the incomes of the six cardinal suburbicarian bishops. After consulting with the curial cardinals and with their agreement, he issued the decree Edita a Nobis, which ordered that in the future the incomes of the cardinal bishops should be placed in a single fund, administered by the Office of Economic Affairs, to which each cardinal must render an annual account. Each year, after 6,000 Lire was to be given to each suffragan bishop, the remaining money collected was to be divided into equal portions, the bishop of Ostia to receive two portions, and each of the other bishops one portion. The decree also ordered that the bishop of Ostia, when promoted to that position, should also retain his previous bishopric; the diocese of Velitrae was to be removed from his jurisdiction, and from that point the suburbicarian sees would be: Ostiensis, Portuensis et Sanctae Rufinae, Albanensis, Praenestina, Sabinensis, Tusculana, Veliterna.

== Incumbents ==
=== Cardinal bishops of Porto ===
- Gregorius (attested 314)
- Donatus (date uncertain)
- Petrus (attested 465)

[Romanus]
[Damasus]

- Glycerius (attested 473/474)
- Herennius (487)
- Castus (501)

[Gregorius]

- Felix (attested 599)
- Joannes (680)
- Gregorius (attested 710–721)
- Gregorius (attested 743–761)
- Citonatus (767–769)
- Giovanni (797 – between 814 and 826)
- Stephanus (826–853)
- Rhadoaldus (853–864)
- Formosus (864–876), who became pope (891)
- Walpert (876–883)
- Valentino (883)
- Cardinal Formosus (later Pope Formosus) (864 – 876, 883 – 891.10.06)
- Silvestro (891–898)
- Crisogonus (after 904)
- Costantinus (958)
- Benedictus (963–964 and again in 967–969),
- Gregorius (985–994),
- Benedictus (998–1001)
- Tefilato (1001–1012)
- Benedetto da Potio (1012–ca. 1030)
- Giovanni Ponzio (1025–1033)
- Giovanni (1032–1046)

[Giorgio (1046–ca. 1049)]

- Giovanni (1049–1062)
- Rolando (ca. 1050/1057)
- Giovanni (1057–c. 1089)
- Giovanni (1087–1095)
- Mauritius (1097–1102)

The See of Porto was combined with the suburbicarian See of Silva Candida (or Santa Rufina) by Pope Callistus II (1119–1124).

=== Cardinal bishops of Santa Rufina (Silva Candida) ===
- Adeodatus
- Valentinus
- Tiberius (594)
- Ursus (680)
- Nicetas (710)
- Hildebrand (906)
- Peter (1026)
- Petrus (c. 1036–c. 1044)
- Crescentius (attested 1044–1050)
- Humbertus (1050–1061)
- Mainardo of Pomposa (1061–1073)

=== Cardinal bishops of Porto and Santa Rufina ===
==== 1100–1499 ====
- Pietro Senex (1102–1134)
- Giovanni (1134 – 1136/8)
- Theodwin, bishop of S. Rufina only (1134–1151)
- Cencio de Gregorio (1154–1157)
- Bernard (1158–1176)
- Guglielmo Marengo (1176–1178)
- Theodinus de Arrone (1179–1186)
- Bobo (1189)
- Pietro Gallocia (1190–1211)
- Benedetto (1213–1216)
- Cinzio Cenci (1217)
- Conrad of Urach (1219–1227)
- Romano Bonaventura (1231–1243)
- Otto of Tonengo, Ottone Candido (1244 – 1250/51)
- Giacomo da Castell'arquato (1251–1253)
- John of Toledo (1261–1275)
- Robert Kilwardby (1278–1279)
- Bernard de Languissel (1281–1290)
- Matteo da Acquasparta (1291–1302)
- Giovanni Minio (1302–1312)
- Giacomo Arnaldo d'Euse (1313–1316), who became Pope John XXII
- Bernard Castanet (1316–1317)
- Berenger Fredoli the Younger (1317–1323)
- Pierre d'Arrabloy (1327–1331)
- Jean-Raymond de Comminges (1331–1348)
- Bernard d'Albi (1349–1350)
- Guy de Boulogne (1350–1373)
- Pietro Corsini (1374–1405)
- Antonio Caetani (seniore) (1409–1412)
- Antonio Correr (1409–1431)
- Louis, Duke of Berry (1412–1431)
- Angelo Corraro (1415–1417), Former Pope Gregory XII
- Branda da Castiglione (1431–1440)
- Domingo Ram (1444–1445)
- Francesco Condulmer (1445–1453)
  - John Kemp, bishop of Santa Rufina only (1452–1454)
- Guillaume d'Estouteville (1459–1461)
- Juan Carvajal (1461–1469)
- Richard Olivier de Longueil (1470)
- Filippo Calandrini (1471–1476)
- Rodrigo Borgia (1476–1492), who became Pope Alexander VI

==== 1500–1599 ====
- Jorge da Costa (1503–1508)
- Raffaele Riario (1508–1511)
- Domenico Grimani (1511–1523)
- Francesco Soderini (1523)
- Niccolò Fieschi (1523–1524)
- Alessandro Farnese (1524 in May/June)
- Antonia Maria Ciocchi del Monte (1524–1533)
- Giovanni Piccolomini (1533–1535)
- Giovanni Domenico de Cupis (1535–1537)
- Bonifacio Ferrero (1537–1543)
- Antonio Sanseverino (1543)
- Marino Grimani (1543–1546)
- Giovanni Salviati (1546–1553)
- Gian Pietro Carafa (1553), who became Pope Paul IV
- Jean du Bellay (1553–1555)
- Rodolfo Pio (1555–1562)
- Francesco Pisani (1562–1564)
- Federico Cesi (1564–1565)
- Giovanni Morone (1565–1570)
- Cristoforo Madruzzi (1570–1578)
- Alessandro Farnese (1578–1580)
- Fulvio Corneo (1580–1583)
- Giacomo Savelli (1583–1587)
- Giovanni Antonio Serbelloni (1587–1589)
- Iñigo Avalos de Aragón (1591–1600)

==== 1600–1699 ====
- Tolomeo Gallio (1600–1603)
- Girolamo Rusticucci (1603)
- Girolamo Simoncelli (1603–1605)
- Domenico Pinelli (1605–1607)
- Girolamo Bernerio (1607–1611)
- Antonio Maria Gallio (1611–1615)
- Antonio Maria Sauli (1615–1620)
- Giovanni Evangelista Pallotta (1620)
- Benedetto Giustiniani (1620–1621)
- Francesco Maria Bourbon del Monte (1621–1623)
- Francesco Sforza di Santa Fiora (1623–1624)
- Ottavio Bandini (1624–1626)
- Giovanni Battista Deti (1626–1629)
- Domenico Ginnasi (1629–1630)
- Carlo Emmanuele Pio de Savoia (1630–1639)
- Marcello Lante della Rovere (1639–1641)
- Pier Paolo Crescenzi (1641–1645)
- Francesco Cennini de' Salamandri (1645)
- Giulio Roma (1645–1652)
- Carlo de Medici (1652)
- Francesco Barberini (seniore) (1652–1666)
- Marzio Ginetti (1666–1671)
- Francesco Maria Brancaccio (1671–1675)
- Ulderico Carpegna (1675–1679)
- Cesare Facchinetti (1679–1680)
- Carlo Rossetti (1680–1681)
- Niccolò Albergati-Ludovisi (1681–1683)
- Alderano Cybo (1683–1687)
- Pietro Vito Ottoboni (1687–1689), who became Pope Alexander VIII
- Flavio Chigi Sr. (1689–1693)
- Giacomo Franzoni (1693–1697)
- Paluzzo Paluzzi Altieri degli Albertoni (1698)
- Emmanuel Théodose de la Tour d'Auvergne de Bouillon (1698–1700)

==== 1700–1799 ====
- Nicolò Acciaioli (1700–1715)
- Vicenzo M. Orsini (1715–1724), who became Pope Benedict XIII
- Fabrizio Paolucci (1724–1725)
- Francesco Pignatelli (1725–1734)
- Pietro Ottoboni (1734–1738)
- Tommaso Ruffo (1738–1740)
- Lodovico Pico della Mirandola (1740–1743)
- Annibale Albani (1743–1751)
- Pierluigi Carafa (1751–1753)
- Rainiero d'Elci (1753–1756)
- Giovanni Antonio Guadagni (1756–1759)
- Francesco Scipione Maria Borghese (1759)
- Giuseppe Spinelli (1759–1761)
- Camillo Paolucci (1761–1763)
- Federico Marcello Lante della Rovere (1763–1773)
- Gian Francesco Albani (1773–1775)
- Carlo Rezzonico Jr (1776–1799)

==== 1800–1972 ====
- Leonardo Antonelli (1800–1807)
- Luigi Valenti Gonzaga (1807–1808)
- Alessandro Mattei (1809–1814)
- Giuseppe Doria Pamphili (1814–1816)
- Antonio Dugnani (1816–1818)
- Giulio Maria della Somaglia (1818–1820)
- Michele di Pietro (1820–1821)
- Bartolomeo Pacca (1821–1830)
- Pierfrancesco Galleffi (1830–1837)
- Emmanuele de Gregorio (1837–1839)
- Gianfrancesco Falzacappa (1839–1840)
- Carlo Maria Pedicini (1840–1843)
- Vincenzo Macchi (1844–1847)
- Luigi Lambruschini (1847–1854)
- Mario Mattei (1854–1860)
- Costantino Patrizi Naro (1860–1870)
- Luigi Amat di San Filippo e Sorso (1870–1877)
- Camillo di Pietro (1877–1878)
- Carlo Sacconi (1878–1884)
- Giovanni Battista Pitra (1884–1889)
- Luigi Oreglia di Santo Stefano (1889–1896)
- Lucido Maria Parocchi (1896–1903)
- Serafino Vannutelli (1903–1915)
- Antonio Vico (1915–1929)
- Tommaso Pio Boggiani (1929–1942)
- Eugène Tisserant (1946–1972)

=== Cardinal bishops since 1972 ===
- Paolo Marella (1972–1984)
- Agostino Casaroli (1985–1998)
- Roger Etchegaray (1998–2019)
- Beniamino Stella (2020–present)

=== Suffragan bishops, 1910–1967 ===
- Luigi Ermini (30 Dec 1908 – 4 Dec 1914)
- Antonio Maria Capettini, P.I.M.E. (1926–1929)
- Luigi Martinelli (13 Mar 1933 – 18 Feb 1946)
- Pietro Villa, F.S.C.J. (25 Mar 1946 – 13 Nov 1960)

=== Diocesan bishops, since 1967 ===
- Andrea Pangrazio (1967–1984)
- Pellegrino Tomaso Ronchi (1984–1985)
- Diego Natale Bona (1985–1994)
- Antonio Buoncristiani (1994–2001)
- Gino Reali (2002–2021)
- Gianrico Ruzza (2022–present)

== Bibliography ==
- Bräuer, Martin (2014). Handbuch der Kardinäle: 1846-2012 (in German). De Gruyter. ISBN 978-3-11-026947-5.
- Brixius, Johann Matthias (1912). Die Mitglieder des Kardinalkollegiums voin 1130–1181 (in German), Berlin: R. Trenkel 1912.
- Cappelletti, Giuseppe (1844). Le chiese d'Italia. Volume primo. (in Italian) Venezia: Giuseppe Antonelli,
- Gams, Pius Bonifatius (1873). Series episcoporum Ecclesiae catholicae: quotquot innotuerunt a beato Petro apostolo (in Latin). Ratisbon: Typis et Sumptibus Georgii Josephi Manz. pp. VIII–XI.
- Eubel, Conradus, ed. (1913). Hierarchia catholica (in Latin). Vol. Tomus 1 (second ed.). Münster: Libreria Regensbergiana.
- Eubel, Conradus, ed. (1914). Hierarchia catholica (in Latin). Vol. Tomus 2 (second ed.). Münster: Libreria Regensbergiana.
- Gulik, Guilelmus (1923). Eubel, Conradus (ed.). Hierarchia catholica (in Latin). Vol. Tomus 3 (second ed.). Münster: Libreria Regensbergiana.
- Gauchat, Patritius (Patrice) (1935). Hierarchia catholica (in Latin). Vol. Tomus IV (1592-1667). Münster: Libraria Regensbergiana.
- Hüls, Rudolf (1977). Kardinäle, Klerus und Kirchen Roms: 1049-1130 (in German), Tübingen: Max Niemeyer 1977.
- Jaffé, Philipp, Regesta Pontificum Romanorum ab condita ecclesia ad annum p. Chr. n. 1198 (in Latin); 2nd ed. by S. Löwenfeld, F. Kaltenbrunner, P. Ewald Vol 1. Leipzig, 1888.
- Kehr, Paul Fridolin (1907). Italia pontificia (in Latin). Vol. II: Latium. Berlin: Weidmann. pp. 17–23.
- Klewitz, Hans-Walter (1957). Reformpapsttum und Kardinalkolleg (in German), Darmstadt 1957.
- Lanzoni, Francesco (1927). Le diocesi d'Italia dalle origini al principio del secolo VII (an. 604). (in Italian) Faenza: F. Lega, pp. 110–117.
- Lentz, Harris M., III (2002). Popes and Cardinals of the 20th Century: A Biographical Dictionary. McFarland & Company, Inc. ISBN 9781476621555.
- Ritzler, Remigius; Sefrin, Pirminus (1952). Hierarchia catholica medii et recentis aevi V (1667-1730). Patavii: Messagero di S. Antonio.
- Ritzler, Remigius; Sefrin, Pirminus (1958). Hierarchia catholica medii et recentis aevi. Vol. Tomus VI (1730-1799). Patavii: Messagero di S. Antonio. (in Latin)
- Ritzler, Remigius; Sefrin, Pirminus (1968). Hierarchia Catholica medii et recentioris aevi sive summorum pontificum, S. R. E. cardinalium, ecclesiarum antistitum series... A pontificatu Pii PP. VII (1800) usque ad pontificatum Gregorii PP. XVI (1846) (in Latin). Vol. VII. Monasterii: Libr. Regensburgiana.
- Remigius Ritzler; Pirminus Sefrin (1978). Hierarchia catholica Medii et recentioris aevi... A Pontificatu PII PP. IX (1846) usque ad Pontificatum Leonis PP. XIII (1903) (in Latin). Vol. VIII. Il Messaggero di S. Antonio.
- Pięta, Zenon (2002). Hierarchia catholica medii et recentioris aevi... A pontificatu Pii PP. X (1903) usque ad pontificatum Benedictii PP. XV (1922) (in Latin). Vol. IX. Padua: Messagero di San Antonio. ISBN 978-88-250-1000-8.

=== External links ===
- Suburbicarian Diocese of Porto-Santa Rufina Official Website
- GCatholic
- Miranda, Salvador. "Suburbicarian Dioceses and Cardinal Patriarchs of Oriental Rite - Porto-Santa Rufina". The Cardinals of the Holy Roman Church. Florida International University. OCLC 53276621.
