= Bartolomeo Pacca =

19th-century Italian cleric, scholar, and statesman

His Eminence Bartolomeo Pacca
- Prefect of the Congregation of Ceremonies
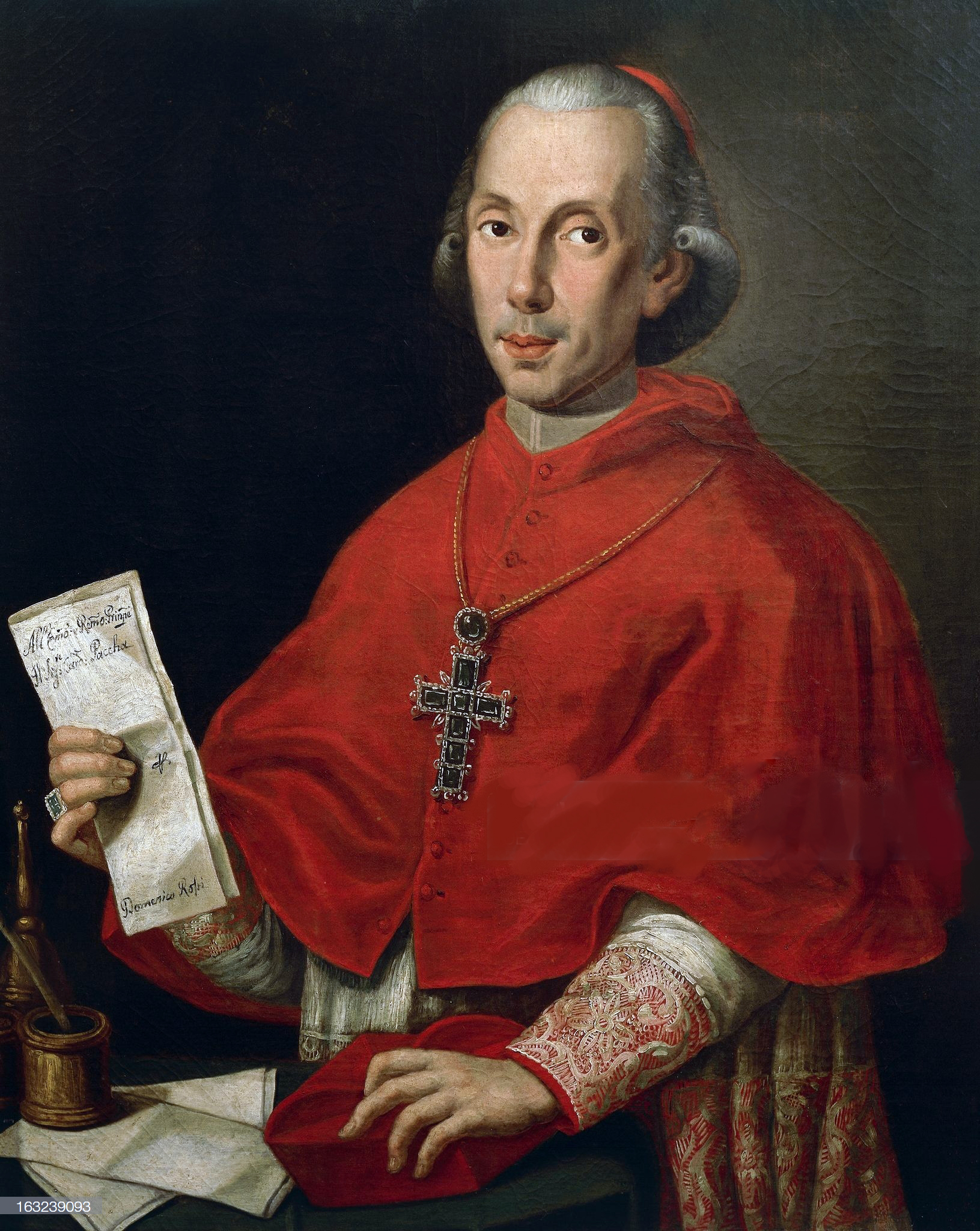
- Portrait.
- Church: Roman Catholic Church
- Appointed: 5 July 1830
- Term ended: 19 April 1844
- Predecessor: Giulio Maria della Somaglia
- Successor: Ludovico Micara
- Other posts: Cardinal-Protector of the Pontifical Ecclesiastical Academy (1820–44); Pro-Datary of the Apostolic Dataria (1824–44); Secretary of the Commission of Roman and Universal Inquisition (1830–44); Cardinal-Bishop of Ostia-Velletri (1830–44); Dean of the College of Cardinals (1830–44); Archpriest of the Basilica of Saint John Lateran (1830–44)
- Previous posts: Titular Archbishop of Tamiathis (1785–1801); Apostolic Nuncio to Portugal (1794–1808); Cardinal-Priest of San Silvestro in Capite (1802–18); Camerlengo of the College of Cardinals (1804–05; 1837–38); Pro-Secretary of State (1808–14); Camerlengo of the Holy Roman Church (1814–24); Cardinal-Priest of San Lorenzo in Lucina (1818); Prefect of the Congregation of Bishops and Regulars (1818–24); Cardinal-Bishop of Frascati (1818–21); Cardinal-Bishop of Porto e Santa Rufina (1821–30); Vice-Dean of the College of Cardinals (1821–30)

Orders
- Consecration: 17 April 1786 by Giovanni Carlo Boschi
- Created cardinal: 23 February 1801 by Pope Pius VII
- Rank: Cardinal-Priest (1801–18); Cardinal-Bishop (1818–44)

Personal details
- Born: Bartolomeo Pacca; 27 December 1756 Benevento, Kingdom of Naples
- Died: 19 April 1844 (aged 87) Rome, Papal States
- Buried: Santa Maria in Portico Campitelli
- Parents: Orazio Pacca; Cristina Malaspina
- Education: Pontifical Academy of Ecclesiastical Nobles; La Sapienza
- Coat of arms

Styles of Bartolomeo Pacca
- Reference style: Eminentissimo Cardinale
- Spoken style: Eminenza
- Informal style: Cardinal
- See: Bishop of Ostia

Bartolomeo Pacca (27 December 1756, Benevento – 19 April 1844, Rome) was an Italian cardinal, scholar, and statesman as Cardinal Secretary of State. Pacca served as apostolic nuncio to Cologne, and later to Lisbon.

== Biography ==
Bartolomeo Pacca was born at Benevento, the son of the nobleman Orazio Pacca, Marquess di Matrice, and Crispina Malaspina. He was educated by the Jesuits at Naples, by the Somaschans in the Clementine College at Rome, and at the Accademia dei Nobili Ecclesiastici.

=== Diplomatic career ===
==== Jurisdictional disputes in Germany ====
In 1785, he was consecrated titular archbishop of Tamiathis and Pope Pius VI appointed him to succeed Carlo Bellisomi, who had been appointed to Portugal, as nuncio at Cologne, the centre of anti-Roman agitation. Pacca arrived at Cologne in June 1786. Archduke Maximilian of Austria, who had written a courteous letter to Pacca at Rome, told him he would not be recognized unless he formally promised not to exercise any act of jurisdiction in the archdiocese. The same attitude was taken by the Archbishops of Trier and Mainz, the other ecclesiastical Electors. Hostility to Rome, incited chiefly by the work of Febronius, was then at a high pitch on account of the establishment of the new nunciature of Munich; yet the other bishops and the magistrates of Cologne received Pacca with all due respect. Even Prussia made no difficulty, and its monarch, in recognition of his friendly attitude, was accorded at Rome the title of king, against which Pope Clement XI had protested in 1701, when the emperor would have granted it. On his journey through his dominions on the Rhine, Frederick William received the nuncio with great honour.

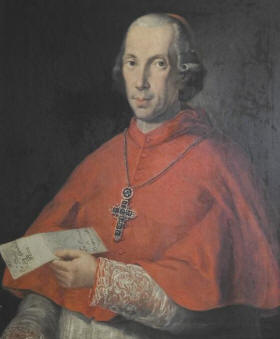
Cardinal Bartolomeo Pacca

Pacca's position with respect to the three ecclesiastical electors was difficult. When the Archbishop of Cologne, in 1786, opened in his residential city the University of Bonn, the discourses given were a declaration of war against the Holy See. At the University of Cologne, although still loyal to the Holy See, an attempt to support Febronian propositions was frustrated by the nuncio, against whom innumerable pamphlets were directed. Pacca induced some prominent German writers to uphold the rights of the Holy See.

He soon had a dispute with the Elector of Cologne. In conformity with the Punctation of Ems, agreed on by the three archbishop-electors and the Archbishop of Salzburg in 1786, the Archbishop of Cologne protested against a matrimonial dispensation given by the nuncio in virtue of his faculties, and went so far as to grant dispensations not contained in his quinquennial faculties, instructing the pastors to have no further recourse to the nuncio for similar dispensations. The nuncio, in accordance with instructions from Rome, directed a circular to all the pastors in his jurisdiction apprising them of the invalidity of such dispensations. The four archbishops thereupon appealed to Emperor Joseph II to entirely abolish the jurisdiction of the nuncios, but the emperor referred the matter to the Diet of Ratisbon, where it was quashed.

Pacca also opposed freedom of worship for the Protestants of Cologne, but so tactfully that his intervention was not apparent, and did not offend the King of Prussia. In 1790 he went on a secret mission to the Diet of Frankfurt to safeguard the interests of the Holy See, and prevented the adoption of a new concordat. When the French invaded the Rhine provinces, he was ordered to leave Cologne, but he had the satisfaction of being finally recognized as nuncio by the Archbishop of Trier.

==== Portuguese Regalism ====
In 1794 he succeeded Bellisomi as nuncio in Portugal where relations between the Crown and the Holy See were theoretically controlled by the Concordat of 1778. Once there, he inherited the tension that existed between the apostolic vicars and the bishops of Portugal, who were supported by the University of Coimbra. The Portuguese kings ordered the construction of churches, and nominated pastors and bishops. Thus the structure of the kingdom of Portugal had both religious and political dimensions. Under the Padroado Real many characteristic activities of the Catholic Church were functions of powerful politicians.

The Marquis of Pombal had institutionalized the process of book censorship with establishment of the Real Mesa Censória (Royal Censorial Court). A law passed on April 5, 1768 reaffirmed the right of "temporal sovereignty" over the prohibition of "pernicious books and papers" in the interest of political defense. This law actually prohibited even certain documents issued by the Holy See like the In Coena Domini bull of 1792 (which reserved exclusively to the Pope powers now claimed by the Monarch). The censors would forbid books supporting an ultramontane view and approve those espousing the opposite position. Four of the eight members of the Mesa, which supervised books pertaining to theology and dogma, were not ecclesiastics. As the Mesa had jurisdiction over all printed materials, this included pastoral letters. Pacca made little headway against the entrenched institution.

While still at Lisbon, he was created cardinal of the title of San Silvestro in Capite (23 February 1801), and assigned to various Roman Congregations. Of both nunciatures, he wrote memoirs, containing observations on the character of the countries and their governments.

==== Rome ====
In 1808 French troops were stationed in Rome. Yielding to the insistence of Napoleon Bonaparte, Pope Pius VII sacrificed Cardinal Consalvi, his faithful Secretary of State, and the pro-secretaries, Casoni, Doria and Gabrielli. The last-named was surprised in his apartments by the soldiers, placed under arrest, and ordered to leave papal territory. Two days later (18 June 1808) the pope appointed Pacca pro-secretary.

In his new position Pacca carefully avoided everything that might provoke the emperor's anger, even ignoring the excesses of the French soldiery in and about Rome. But in August he felt obliged to publish in every province a decree forbidding subjects of the Holy See to enlist in the new "Civic Guard" of Napoleon I and, in general, under any foreign command. The "Civic Guard" was a hotbed of turbulence that might easily produce a rebellion in the Pontifical States. But Miollis, the French commandant, was furious, and threatened Pacca with dismissal from Rome. The pro-secretary replied that he took orders from the pope alone. Realizing that the annexation of Rome was inevitable, Pacca took precautions to prevent a sudden attack on the Quirinal; at the same time advising calm and quiet. The Bull of excommunication against Napoleon had been prepared in 1806, to be published in the event of annexation. On 10 June 1809, when the change of government actually took place, the Bull was promulgated; on 6 July, the Quirinal Palace was attacked, the pope arrested and taken to France and thence to Savona. Pacca was among those who accompanied him. As far as Florence, he tried to cheer Pius VII; at Florence he was torn from the pontiff's side, much to his sorrow, and saw him again only at Rivoli and Grenoble. From Grenoble he was conducted (6 August 1809) to the Fenestrelle Fort, where he was confined and closely guarded. During this period the captive minister found time to write those records which formed the substance of his Memorie storiche del ministero....

Finally, on 30 January 1813, he was told that in view of the concordat between the pope and Napoleon at Fontainebleau (25 January) he was free to join the pope. Napoleon had long objected to his liberation, declaring: "Pacca is my enemy". At Fontainebleau he and the other liberated cardinals insisted that Pius VII should retract the last concordat and refuse further negotiations until he was back in Rome with full freedom. Pacca also suggested the re-establishment of the Society of Jesus, although both the pope and he himself had been educated in prejudices against the society.

When Pius VII was conducted to Savona the second time, Pacca was deported to Uzès (January 1814), leaving that place on 22 April. He joined the pope at Sinigaglia whence he accompanied him to Rome. Appointed Camerlengo of the Holy Roman Church in the same year, he exerted himself to re-establish the religious orders from the foundations not already sold.

During the absence of Consalvi at the Congress of Vienna, Pacca again became Pro-Secretary of State, the restoration of the pontifical Government thus devolving upon him. He was reproved by Consalvi, from Vienna, for his severity towards the supporters of the Napoleonic regime, and vainly tried to justify his conduct. When Joachim Murat, Napoleonic satellite King of Naples, sent his troops through the Pontifical States to meet the Austrians, Pacca advised Pius VII to seek temporary refuge at Genoa, fearing that Murat would attempt to ravage the domains of the Holy See. During the pope's absence, the provisional Government caused the arrest of Cardinal Maury on a charge of having secret intelligence with Murat, and his trial was continued even after the pope's return. But Consalvi, immediately on his arrival, stopped the proceedings.

The rest of Pacca's life was occupied in the affairs of the different congregations to which he was assigned, and in the administration of the suburbicarian sees. In 1818 he became Prefect of the Sacred Congregation of Bishops and Regulars (clergy who lived under a Rule). At the Consistory of 21 December 1818, he was promoted to the rank of Cardinal-Bishop, with the suburbicarian See of Frascati; he exchanged this See for the See of Porto and Santa Rufina on 13 August 1821. Upon the death of Pope Pius VII, as Cardinal Camerlengo, he presided over the arrangements for the conclave of 1823. He resigned the office of Camerlengo in 1824, when Pope Leo XII appointed him pro-datary, he was the first to hold the post of cardinal legate of Velletri, and he was active against the Carbonari.

He participated in the conclave of 1829, and presided as Dean of the Sacred College of Cardinals at the conclave of 1830-1831, following the death of Pope Pius VIII. He was himself a candidate for the Papacy, and enjoyed considerable support from the pro-Austrian faction of cardinals, led by Cardinal Giuseppe Albani. Pacca had indicated his own sympathies in a pre-conclave meeting of cardinals, at which he read a letter which had been given to him by Pius VIII shortly before his death. The letter revealed that, at the direction of the Pope, Cardinal Albani, the Secretary of State, had written to the Austrian general at Verona, inviting him to move his troops up to the borders of the Papal States to be prepared against revolutionary disorders. Nonetheless, Pacca was not elected pope, and Albani did not receive a continuation of his post as Secretary of State. A less inflammatory candidate, Mauro Cappellari, who was still agreeable to appointing a pro-Austrian Secretary of State (Cardinal Bernetti), was elected instead.

Under the new pope, Gregory XVI, Pacca received the additional appointment of Secretary to the Sacred Congregation of the Holy Inquisition. He also became Archpriest of the Lateran Basilica. Pacca was engaged by Gregory in attempting to resolve the church's continuing dispute with Félicité de La Mennais.

He died at Rome on 19 April 1844, and was buried in the church of Santa Maria in Portico.

== Legacy ==
Pacca's house was frequented by illustrious scientists, men of letters and artists, both Roman and foreign. He had excavations made at Ostia at his own expense, and with the objects discovered formed a small museum in his vineyard on the Via Aurelia (Casino of Pius V).

== Works ==
- Memorie storiche della nunziatura di Colonia
- Dei grandi meriti verso la Chiesa Cattolica del clero dell' Universita e de' Magistrati di Colonia nel secolo XVI
- Notizie sul Portogallo e sulla nunziatura di Lisbona
- Memorie storiche per servire alla storia ecclesiastica del secolo XIX (1809–1814)
- Notizie storiche intorno alla vita e gli scritti di Mons. Franc. Pacca, arcivescovo di Benevento (1752–1775).

Catholic Church titles
Preceded by Giulio Maria della Somaglia	Cardinal-bishop of Frascati; 21 December 1818 – 13 August 1821	Succeeded by Francesco Saverio Castiglioni
Preceded by Michele di Pietro	Cardinal-bishop of Porto; 13 August 1821 – 5 July 1830	Succeeded by Pietro Francesco Galleffi
Preceded by Leonardo Antonelli	Archpriest of the Basilica of St. John Lateran; 5 July 1830 – 19 April 1844	Succeeded by Benedetto Barberini
Preceded by Giulio Maria della Somaglia	Bishop of Ostia; 5 July 1830 – 19 April 1844	Succeeded by Ludovico Micara
Preceded by Giulio Maria della Somaglia	Dean of the College of Cardinals; 5 July 1830 – 19 April 1844	Succeeded by Ludovico Micara
