= Giulio Maria della Somaglia =

Italian cardinal (1744–1830)

His Eminence Giulio Maria della Somaglia
- Cardinal; Archivist of the Vatican Secret Archives; Librarian of the Vatican Apostolic Library
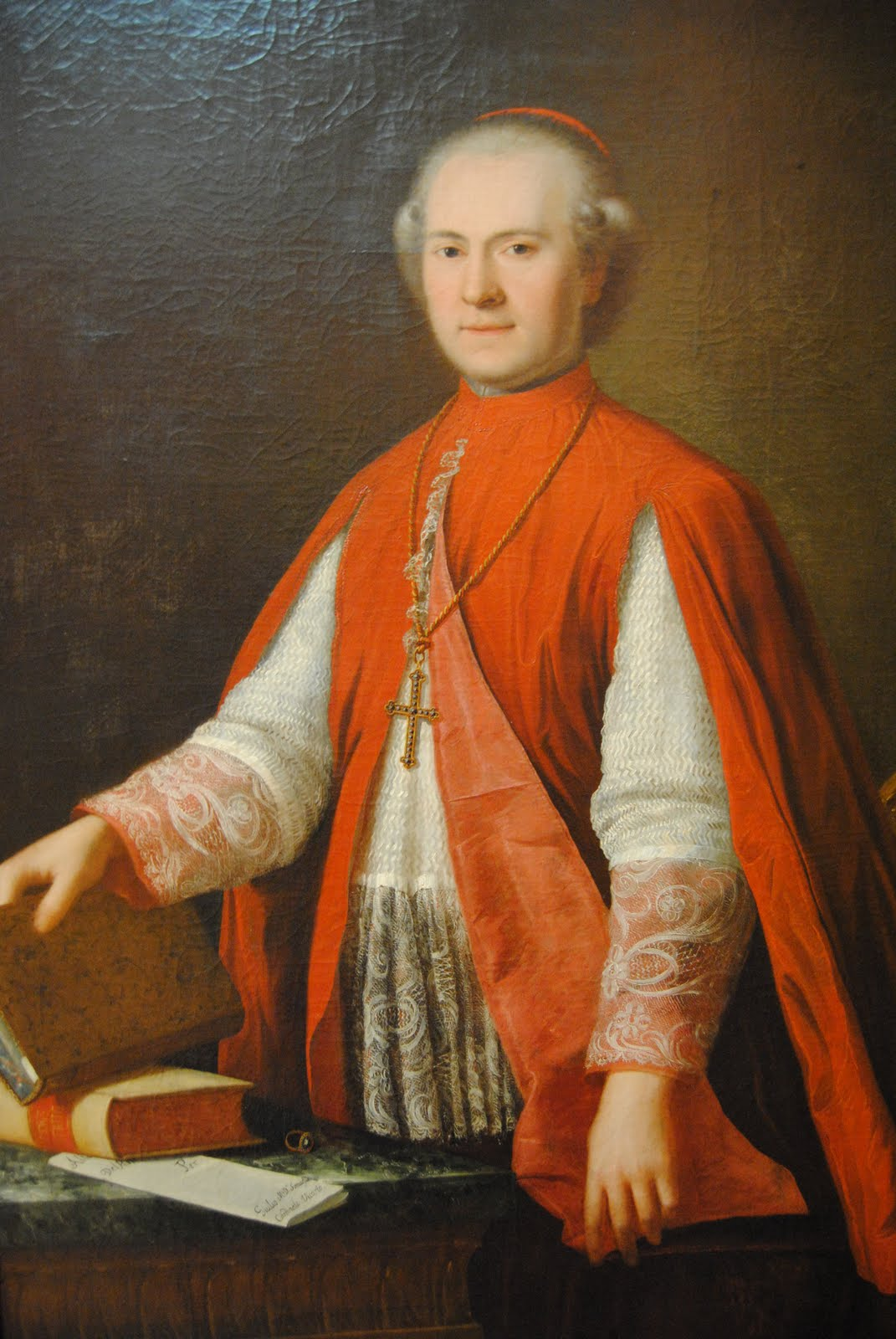
- Portrait of Somaglia by Gaspare Landi, c. 1786
- Church: Roman Catholic Church
- Appointed: 1 October 1826
- Term ended: 2 April 1830
- Predecessor: Luigi Valenti Gonzaga
- Successor: Giuseppe Albani
- Other posts: Secretary of Commission of Roman and Universal Inquisition (1814-30); Cardinal-Priest of San Lorenzo in Damaso "in commendum" (1818-30); Vice-Chancellor of the Apostolic Chancery (1818-30); Cardinal-Bishop of Ostia–Velletri (1820-30); Prefect of the Congregation of Ceremonies (1820-30); Dean of the College of Cardinals (1820-30)
- Previous posts: Secretary of the Congregation for Bishops and Regulars (1787-88); Patriarch of Antioch (1788-95); Vicar General of Rome (1795-1818); Cardinal-Priest of Santa Sabina (1795-1801); Camerlengo of the College of Cardinals (1797-98; 1798-1801); Cardinal-Priest of Santa Maria sopra Minerva (1801-14); Cardinal-Bishop of Frascati (1814-18); Cardinal-Bishop of Porto e Santa Rufina (1818-20); Vice-Dean of the College of Cardinals (1818-20); Secretary of State (1823-28); Pro-Prefect of the Congregation for the Propagation of the Faith (1824-26)

Orders
- Ordination: 2 June 1787
- Consecration: 21 December 1788 by Hyacinthe-Sigismond Gerdil
- Created cardinal: 1 June 1795 by Pope Pius VI
- Rank: Cardinal-Priest (1795-1814); Cardinal-Bishop (1814-30)

Personal details
- Born: Giulio Maria della Somaglia; 29 July 1744 Piacenza, Duchy of Milan
- Died: 2 April 1830 (aged 85) Rome, Papal States
- Buried: Santa Maria sopra Minerva
- Parents: Carlo Maria Capece Anguillara; Countess Marianna Fenaroli
- Education: La Sapienza
- Coat of arms: Giulio Maria della Somaglia's coat of arms

Styles of Giulio Maria della Somaglia
- Reference style: His Eminence
- Spoken style: Your Eminence
- Informal style: Cardinal
- See: Antioch

Ordination history of Giulio Maria della Somaglia
History
Episcopal consecration
- Consecrated by: Hyacinthe-Sigismond Gerdil
- Date: 21 December 1788
Episcopal succession
Bishops consecrated by Giulio Maria della Somaglia as principal consecrator
- Fabrizio Cimino: 2 February 1798
- Annibale Di Leo: 2 February 1798
- Michele Palmieri: 2 February 1798
- Filippo Speranza: 2 February 1798
- Florido Pierleoni: 26 September 1802
- Giulio Rossi: 4 November 1804

Giulio Maria della Somaglia (29 July 1744 – 2 April 1830) was an Italian cardinal. and Secretary of State under Pope Leo XII. He was known as a staunch zelante cardinal who helped enforce an authoritarian regime in the crumbling Papal States.

Della Somaglia was born in Piacenza in 1744 to Count Carlo Maria Cavazzia and Countess Marianna Fenaroli; he was one of five children. He was sent to Rome at the age of twelve and studied at the Collegio Nazzareno and La Sapienza University, acquiring degrees in both canon and civil law.

In 1769, he became domestic prelate of Pope Clement XIV and under Pope Pius VI he was secretary to several curial congregations between 1773 and 1787. Although he was only ordained to the priesthood in 1787, he became titular Patriarch of Antioch the following year; he became a cardinal on 1 June 1795.

In his years as a cardinal della Somaglia played an important role as a negotiator with the revolutionary regime in France. Although he undoubtedly agreed with Pius VI's 1791 condemnation of the French Revolution and was expelled from Rome when Napoleon's army invaded in 1808, he was charged with the examination of the concordat with France several years later. This role served to taint della Somaglia's reputation in the eyes of fellow zelanti cardinals. From 1814 he was Secretary of the Inquisition and Dean of the College of Cardinals in 1820.

In the 1823 conclave, della Somaglia was considered papabile. In 1826 he resigned the post of Secretary of State, but continued as Secretary of the Inquisition until his death in 1830. When he died, della Somaglia was the last cardinal still alive elevated by Pius VI.

Catholic Church titles
Preceded by Giuseppe Maria Doria Pamphilj	Cardinal-bishop of Frascati; 26 September 1814 – 21 December 1818	Succeeded by Bartolomeo Pacca
Preceded by Antonio Dugnani	Cardinal-bishop of Porto; 21 December 1818 – 29 May 1820	Succeeded by Michele di Pietro
Preceded by Ercole Consalvi	Cardinal Secretary of State; 28 September 1823 – 17 January 1828	Succeeded by Tommaso Bernetti (Pro-Secretary)
Preceded by Alessandro Mattei	Bishop of Ostia; 29 May 1820 – 2 April 1830	Succeeded by Bartolomeo Pacca
Preceded by Alessandro Mattei	Dean of the College of Cardinals; 29 May 1820 – 2 April 1830	Succeeded by Bartolomeo Pacca
