= Nicolò Acciaioli (cardinal) =

Italian cardinal (1630–1719)

His Eminence Nicolò Acciaioli
- Cardinal-Bishop of Ostia
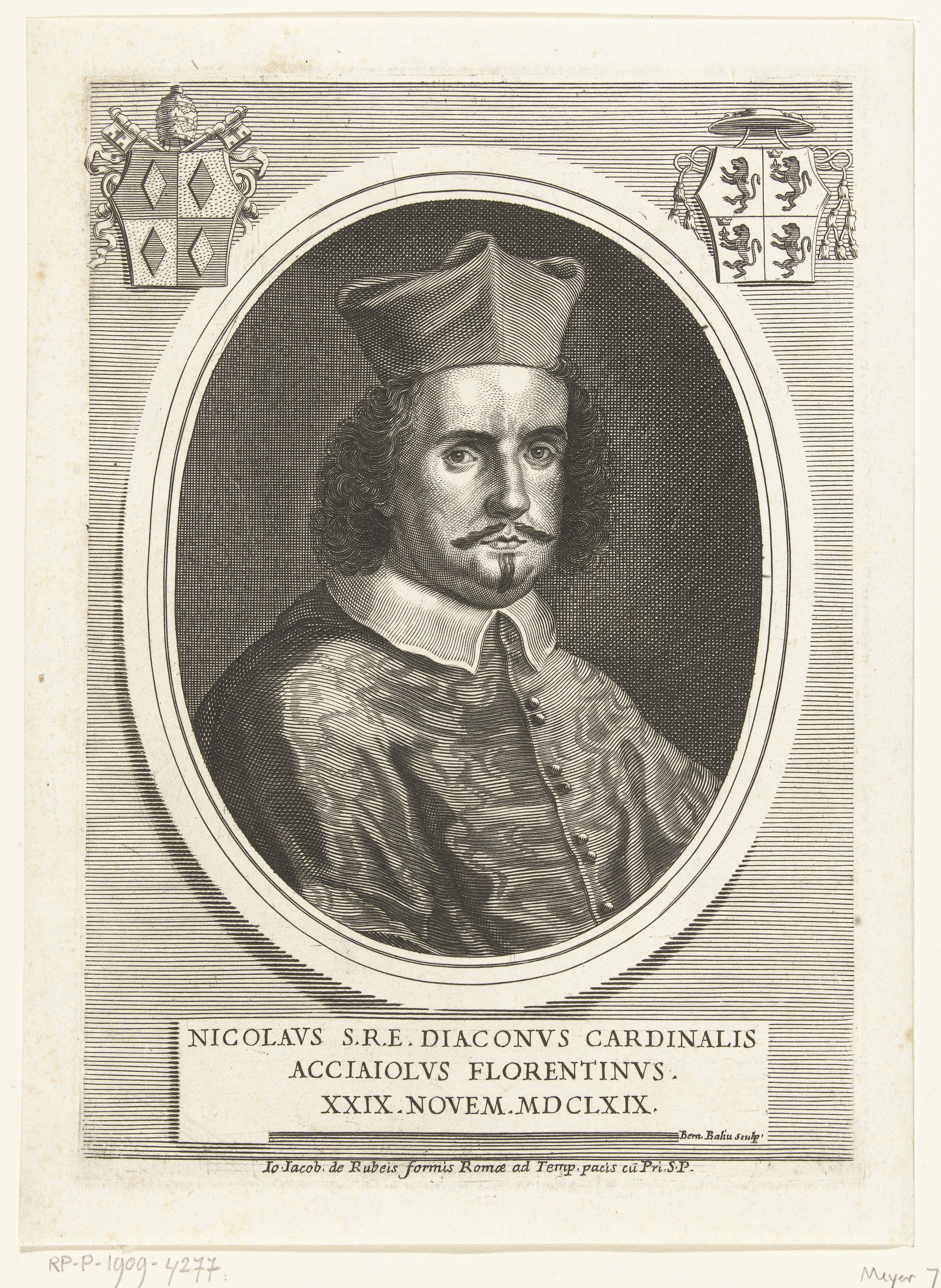
- Portrait of Nicolò Acciaioli in 1669
- Church: Catholic Church
- See: Suburbicarian Diocese of Ostia
- In office: 18 March 1715 – 23 February 1719
- Predecessor: Cardinal de Bouillon
- Successor: Fulvio Astalli
- Previous posts: Cardinal-Bishop of Porto e Santa Rufina (1700-1715); Cardinal-Bishop of Frascati (1693-1700); Cardinal-Priest of San Callisto (1689-1693); Cardinal-Deacon of Santa Maria in Via Lata (1689); Cardinal-Deacon of Santi Cosma e Damiano (1670-1689)

Orders
- Consecration: 8 November 1693 by Francesco Nerli (Jr.)
- Created cardinal: 29 November 1669 by Pope Clement IX

Personal details
- Born: 6 July 1630 Florence, Grand Duchy of Tuscany
- Died: 25 February 1719 (aged 88) Rome, Papal States

Nicolò Acciaioli or Niccolò Acciaiuoli (Florence, 6 July 1630 – Rome, 25 February 1719), was an Italian Cardinal. He was Dean of the Sacred College between 1715 and 1719.

== Biography ==
He belonged to the noble Florentine Acciaioli family, third of the ten children of Senator Ottaviano Acciaioli and Maria Acciaioli and was the uncle of Cardinal Filippo Acciaioli (1700 – 1766).

He graduated in law in Rome. In 1657, he became Auditor camerae at the Apostolic Camera. In the consistory of 29 November 1669, he was appointed Cardinal by Pope Clement IX despite not having yet received his minor orders. Only in March of the following year, he received the title of Cardinal-deacon assigned to the deaconry of Santi Cosma e Damiano. He was Papal legate to the city of Ferrara on several occasions for several years.

In 1689, he became Cardinal protodeacon and in October of the same year, he opted for the deaconry of Santa Maria in Via Lata, but already one month later he became Cardinal priest of San Callisto.

In 1690, he was appointed Abbot commendatory of the abbey of Sant'Angelo de Frigillo in Mesoraca, Calabria. Three years later, he became Cardinal bishop of Frascati, receiving episcopal consecration on 8 November 1693. In 1700, he opted for the Suburbicarian Diocese of Porto–Santa Rufina.

He became Dean of the Sacred College in 1715 and had the title of Cardinal bishop of the Suburbicarian sees of Ostia and Velletri, also assuming the office of Governor of Velletri. In 1717, he became secretary of the Congregation of the Sacred Roman and Universal Inquisition, a position he held until his death.

His body is buried in the church of San Lorenzo, near the Florence Charterhouse, built by a member of his family in the 14th century.

=== Conclaves ===
Niccolò Acciaiuoli participated in the following conclaves :

- 1669–1670 papal conclave, which elected Pope Clement X
- 1676 papal conclave, which elected Pope Innocent XI
- 1691 papal conclave, which elected Pope Innocent XII
- 1700 papal conclave, which elected Pope Clement XI

== Sources ==
- Acciaiuòli, Niccolò in Treccani.
- David M. Cheney, Niccolò Acciaiuoli, in Catholic Hierarchy.
- Salvador Miranda, ACCIAIOLI, Niccolò, on fiu.edu – The Cardinals of the Holy Roman Church, Florida International University.

Catholic Church titles
Preceded by Cardinal de Bouillon	Dean of the College of Cardinals; 1715 – 1719	Succeeded by Fulvio Astalli
