= Bernardino Giraud =

His Eminence Bernardino Giraud
- Cardinal, Archbishop Emeritus of Ferrara
- Archdiocese: Ferrara
- See: Ferrara
- Appointed: 15 March 1773
- Term ended: 14 February 1777
- Predecessor: Marcello Crescenzi
- Successor: Alessandro Mattei
- Other post: Cardinal-Priest of Santissima Trinità al Monte Pincio
- Previous posts: Titular Archbishop of Damascus (1767-1773); Apostolic Nuncio to France (1767-1773)

Orders
- Ordination: 19 March 1767
- Consecration: 26 April 1767 by Pope Clement XIII
- Created cardinal: 17 June 1771
- Rank: Cardinal-Priest

Personal details
- Born: 14 July 1721 Rome
- Died: 5 May 1782 (aged 60)
- Denomination: Roman Catholic

Bernardino Giraud (born 14 July 1721 in Rome, died 5 May 1782) was a Cardinal of the Catholic Church. He served as Apostolic Nuncio to France from 1767 to 1773, and as Archbishop of Ferrara from 1773 until his resignation in 1777. He was elevated to Cardinal in pectore on 17 June 1771, and installed as Cardinal-Priest of SS. Trinità al Monte Pincio in 1773. He participated in the Papal conclave, 1774–1775.

== Episcopal succession ==
Ordination history of Bernardino Giraud
History
Episcopal consecration
- Consecrated by: Pope Clement XIII
Episcopal succession
Bishops consecrated by Bernardino Giraud as principal consecrator
- Alessandro Mattei: 23 February 1777

Giraud was ordained a bishop by Pope Clement XIII on 26 April 1767, being appointed as titular Archbishop of Damascus. Having himself consecrated Alessandro Mattei to the episcopacy, Cardinal Giraud is in the episcopal lineage of Pope Francis.
