= Congregation for the Evangelization of Peoples =

Former department of the Roman Curia

- Latin: Congregatio pro Gentium Evangelizatione
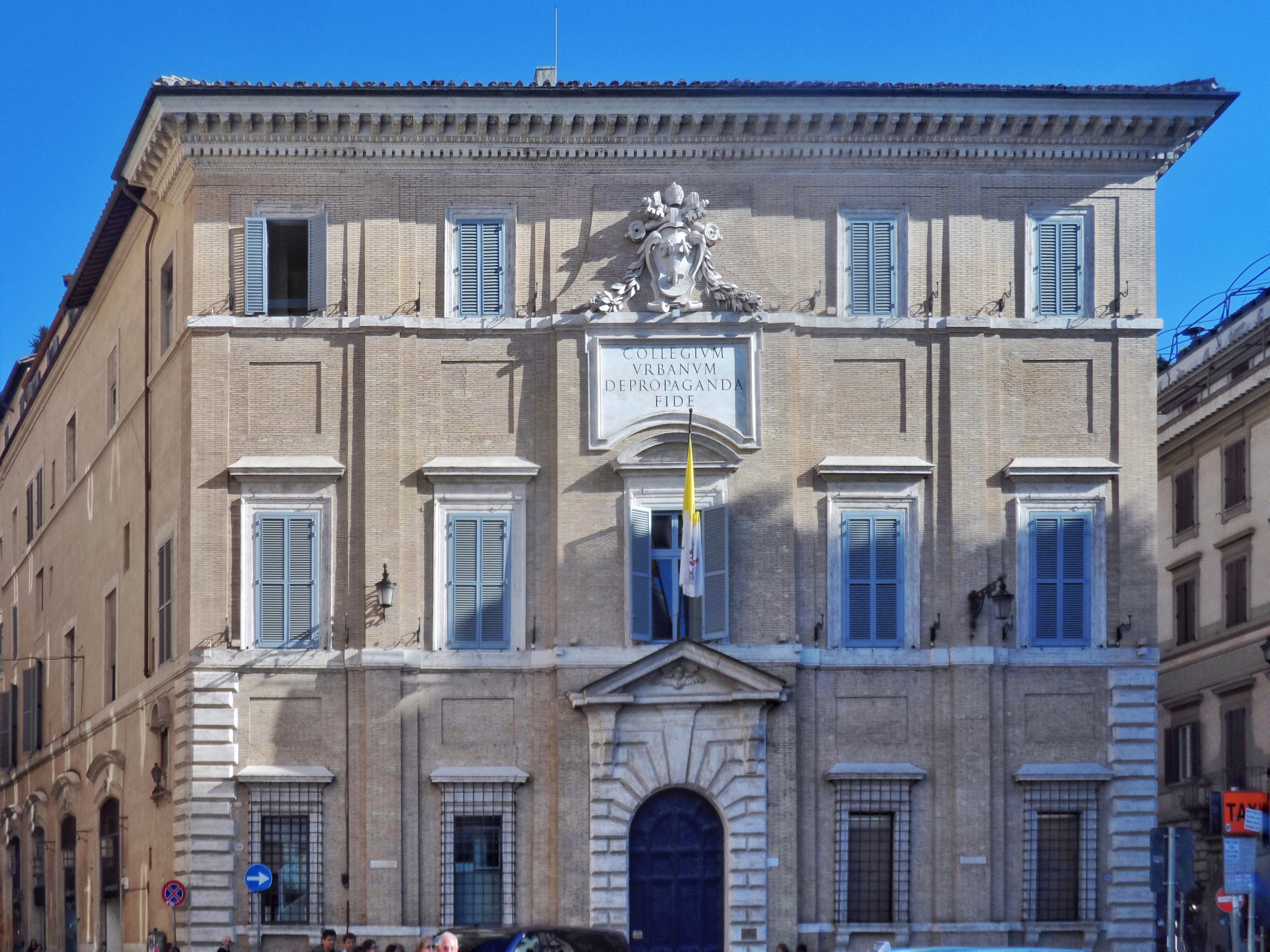
- Palazzo di Propaganda Fide, seat of the Congregation for the Evangelization of Peoples

Dicastery overview
- Formed: 22 June 1622; 404 years ago
- Preceding Dicastery: Sacred Congregation for the Propagation of the Faith
- Dissolved: 5 June 2022
- Superseding Dicastery: Dicastery for Evangelization
- Headquarters: Palazzo di Propaganda Fide, Rome

The Congregation for the Evangelization of Peoples (CEP; Latin: Congregatio pro Gentium Evangelizatione) was a congregation of the Roman Curia of the Catholic Church in Rome, responsible for missionary work and related activities. It is also known by its former title, the Sacred Congregation for the Propagation of the Faith (Latin: Sacra Congregatio de Propaganda Fide), or simply the Propaganda Fide. On 5 June 2022, it was merged with the Pontifical Council for Promoting the New Evangelization into the Dicastery for Evangelization.

It was responsible for Latin Church pre-diocesan missionary jurisdictions: missions sui iuris, apostolic prefectures (neither entitled to a titular bishop) and apostolic vicariates. Eastern Catholic equivalents like apostolic exarchate are the responsibility of the Dicastery for the Eastern Churches. However many former missionary jurisdictions – mainly in the Third World – remain, after promotion to diocese of (Metropolitan) Archdiocese, under the Propaganda Fide instead of the normally competent Congregation for Bishops, notably in countries/regions where the Catholic church is too poor/small (as in most African countries) to aspire self-sufficiency and/or local authorities hostile to Catholic/Christian/any (organized) faith.

It was founded by Pope Gregory XV in 1622 to arrange missionary work on behalf of the various religious institutions, and in 1627 Pope Urban VIII established within it a training college for missionaries, the Pontificio Collegio Urbano de Propaganda Fide. When Pope Paul VI reorganized and adjusted the tasks of the Roman Curia with the publication of Regimini Ecclesiae Universae 15 August 1967, the name of the congregation was changed to the Congregation for the Evangelization of Peoples.

The early congregation was established in the Palazzo Ferratini, donated by Spanish cleric Juan Bautista Vives, to the south of the Piazza di Spagna. Two of the foremost artistic figures of Baroque Rome were involved in the development of the architectural complex; the sculptor and architect Gianlorenzo Bernini and the architect Francesco Borromini.

The last Prefect of the Congregation was Cardinal Luis Antonio Tagle from December 2019 until June 2022. The secretary was Archbishop Protase Rugambwa. The adjunct secretary and President of the Pontifical Mission Societies was Archbishop Giampietro Del Toso. The under-secretary was Father Ryszard Szmydki, O.M.I.

== History ==
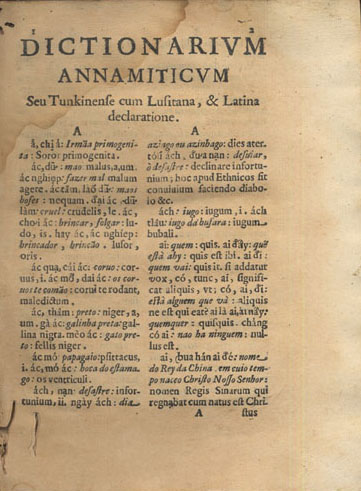
Alexandre de Rhodes' Dictionarium Annamiticum Lusitanum et Latinum, published by the Propaganda Fide in 1651.

Pope Gregory XV founded the Sacred Congregation for the Propagation of the Faith (Propaganda Fide) in 1622. With the bull Inscrutabili Divinae, through the body was charged with fostering the spread of Catholicism and with the regulation of Catholic ecclesiastical affairs in non-Catholic countries. It sought to promote the Church's missionary work and to gain more control over foreign missions from Spain and Portugal.

The Propaganda Fide asserted the law of commissions (jus commisionis). The Propaganda Fide thus had the right to appoint apostolic vicars to function as the bishops of dioceses not yet established. Because of the simultaneous existence of the Propaganda Fide's rights and the patronage system, parts of China had church officials appointed under each power structure.

The death of Pope Gregory XV the following year did not interrupt the organization, because Cardinal Barberini, one of the original thirteen members of the congregation, became the next pope as Urban VIII (1623–1644). Under Urban VIII, a central seminary, the Collegium Urbanum, was established to train missionaries. The Congregation also operated Polyglotta, a printing press in Rome, printing catechisms in many languages.

In 1659, the Propaganda Fide issued instructions for missions in China and Indochina encouraging the development of an indigenous clergy, maintaining close relations with Rome, avoiding national political matters, and adapting the Church as much as possible to local cultures and custom within the bounds of Catholic teaching. Practical implementation of these instructions were mixed. Over the next two hundred years, the authorities downplayed this directive in an effort to increase the global growth of Catholicism via the European colonial powers.

On 23 November 1845, the Propaganda Fide issued Neminem profecto, which instructed the bishops of foreign missions in the necessity of developing native bishops. According to academic Claude Soetens, Neminem profecto was a "dead letter" and was not implemented by European missionaries in East Asia.

In 1908, the United States, Canada, and five Western European countries were removed from the Propaganda Fide's jurisdiction and placed under a separate hierarchy.

On 6 January 1862, Pope Pius IX suppressed the Congregation for the Correction of the Books of the Eastern Church and established the Congregatio de Propaganda Fide pro negotiis ritus orientalis, a section of Propaganda Fide "for the affairs of the Oriental Rite", with the apostolic constitution Romani Pontifici. Pope Benedict XV declared it independent on 1 May 1917 with the motu proprio Dei providentis and named it the Congregatio pro Ecclesia Orientali (Congregation for the Eastern Church). By 1917, all Eastern-rite churches were so removed from the Propaganda Fide's jurisdiction.

During the tenure of Cardinal Domenico Serafini, the Propaganda Fide became increasingly oriented towards the changing circumstances of missions in anti-imperialist political contexts.

In 1924, the Propaganda Fide rescinded the "privilege of precedence of apostolic missionaries," which had granted foreign priests automatic precedence over native priests.

With the publication of Pope Paul VI's Regimini Ecclesiae Universae on 15 August 1967, the Roman Curia was reorganized and the name of the congregation was changed to the Congregation for the Evangelization of Peoples.

In 2014 Sr. Luzia Premoli, superior general of the Combonian Missionary Sisters, was appointed a member of the Congregation for the Evangelization of Peoples, the first woman to be appointed a member of a Roman curial congregation.

With the reform of Praedicate evangelium, the Congregation for the Evangelization of Peoples was merged with the Pontifical Council for Promoting the New Evangelization, to create the Dicastery for Evangelization.

== Purposes ==
The Sacred Congregation for the Propagation of the Faith was established in 1622 due to the realization that the governmental structure of the episcopal structure and the decretal law was not possible. Episcopal structure and the Decretal law was government as described in the New Testament. In this new structure, missionaries would be given orders from Rome, and administrative power would be traded over to those who were titled bishops. The Sacred Congregation for the Propagation of the Faith was left in charge to give faculties to the aforementioned bishops in addition to perfects, who were similar to bishops without the notoriety.

A congregation for the propagation of the faith

On 6 January 1622, Gregory XV erected the Congregation de Propaganda Fide as central and supreme organ for the propagation of the faith to aim at the union of the Orthodox and Protestant Churches and to promote and organize the mission among non-Christians. The goal of this was to regulate missionary work through structural accountability. According to Fernando Cardinal Filoni, "The Congregation for the Evangelization of Peoples has jurisdiction over 186 archdioceses, 785 dioceses, 82 vicariates apostolic, 39 prefectures apostolic, 4 apostolic administrations, 6 missiones sui iuris, 1 territorial abbacy, and 6 military ordinariates," in today's modern organization.

The establishment of a seminary for the training of missionaries

The Pontificio Collegio Urbano de Propaganda Fide ("Pontifical Urban College for the Propagation of the Faith") was established in 1627 by Pope Urban VIII for the purpose of training missionaries. It was located at the former Palazzo Ferratini at the Piazza di Spagna. The college prepared students for holy orders, after which they were to return to their homelands as missionaries. In 1641 Urban VIII placed it directly under the Congregation for the Propagation of the Faith.

In 1931 the new Pontifical Urban University opened on the Janiculum.

The establishment of a printing press to provide literature for missions

The congregation needed to mass-produce literature for their missions so they established their own printing press four years after their founding in 1626 (New Catholic Encyclopedia 11, 751). The press contributed it literature to the Collegium Urbanum as well as to missionaries traveling cross-country to territories that the Vatican entrusted them. The press was originally called Polyglotta, and was intended to print Catholic literature in the various native languages that CPF missionaries would encounter.

== Palazzo di Propaganda Fide ==
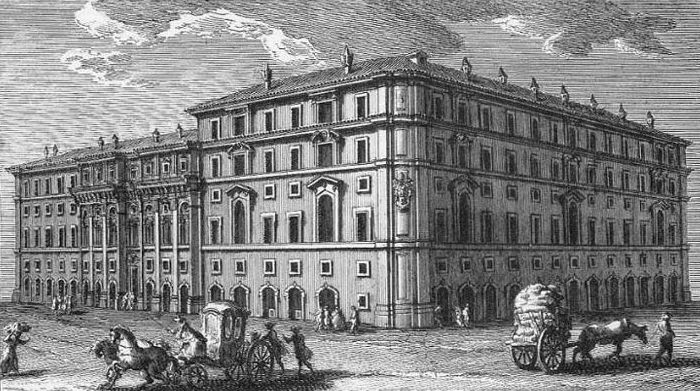
The Southwest facade by Borromini: etching by Giuseppe Vasi, 1761.

The Congregation was originally housed in a small palace, the Palazzo Ferratini, donated by the Spanish priest Vives. The building is located in the Rione Colonna, at the southern end of Piazza di Spagna. The architectural complex of the Propaganda Fide was developed in the triangular urban block between the Via Due Macelli and the Via del Collegio di Propaganda Fide, two streets which diverged from the piazza.

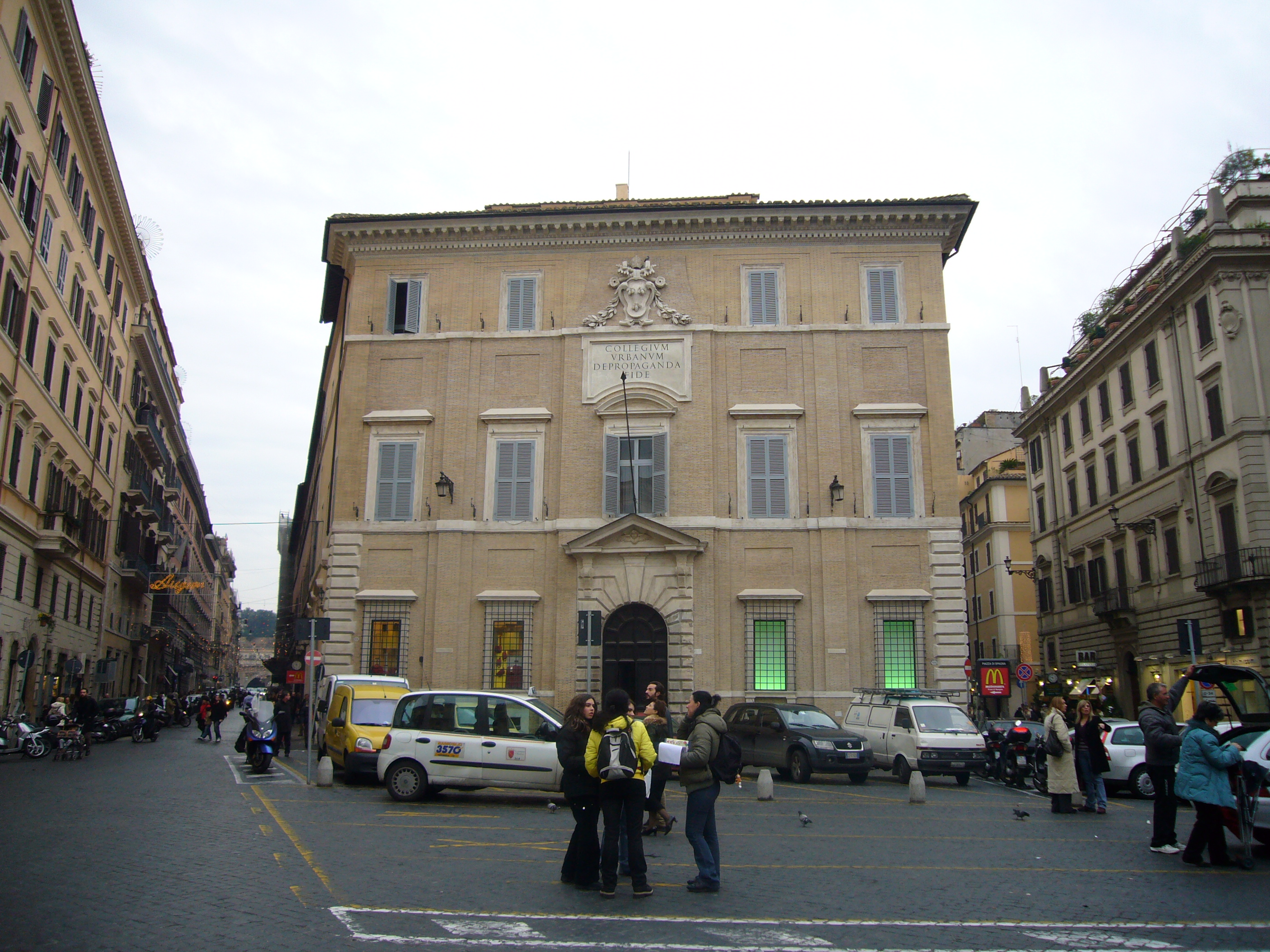
The North facade at Piazza di Spagna by Bernini; behind the Column of the Immaculate Conception. Credit: Lalupa

In 1634 a small oval chapel was built according to designs by Bernini. In 1642, Father Valerio, with Bernini, redesigned the façade to the Piazza di Spagna, and the development was continued along the Via Due Macelli by Gaspare de'Vecchio from 1639–1645.

In 1648, Borromini took over and made various proposals that included demolishing Bernini's chapel, which must have been particularly galling for the latter as he could see the building from his house on Via Mercede. The Re Magi chapel, dedicated to the Three Kings, has a plan with four side chapels and galleries above. The wall pilasters are continued in the vault as ribs that criss-cross and unite the space, unlike his design at the Oratory of Philip Neri Oratorio dei Filippini where the ribs are interrupted by the oval fresco at the centre of the vault. The criss-cross arrangement in the Re Magi Chapel is such that an octagon is formed at the centre, embellished with a Dove of the Holy Spirit bathed in golden rays.

The central door leads into the courtyard where Borromini intended a curved arcade but this was not built. Only the left hand side of the façade relates to the chapel and the right to the stair and entrance to the College.

Other parts of the College have further minor works by Borromini.

== Officials ==
=== Prefects ===
Prefect of Congregation for the Evangelization of Peoples
- Coat of arms of the Holy See

- Incumbent; Luis Antonio Tagle since 8 December 2019
- Congregation for the Evangelization of Peoples
- Style: His Eminence
- Member of: Roman Curia
- Reports to: The Pope
- Appointer: The Pope
- Term length: Five years, renewable
- Constituting instrument: Inscrutabili Divinae; Pastor Bonus
- Formation: 22 June 1622
- First holder: Antonio Maria Sauli
- Abolished: 5 June 2022
- Unofficial names: The Red Pope

The prefect is ex officio President of the Interdicasterial Commission for Consecrated Religious and Grand Chancellor of the Pontifical Urbaniana University.

No.	Name	From	Until	Appointer
1	Antonio Maria Sauli	1622	1622	Gregory XV
2	Ludovico Ludovisi	1622	1632	Gregory XV
3	Antonio Barberini	1632	1645	Urban VIII
4	Luigi Capponi (while Barberini was in exile)	1645	1649	Innocent X
5	Antonio Barberini	1649	1671	Innocent X
6	Paluzzo Paluzzi; Altieri degli Albertoni	1671	1698	Clement X
7	Carlo Barberini	1698	1704	Innocent XII
8	Giuseppe Sacripante	1704	1727	Clement XI
9	Vincenzo Petra	1727	1747	Benedict XIII
10	Silvio Valenti Gonzaga	1747	1756	Benedict XIV
11	Giuseppe Spinelli	1756	1763	Benedict XIV
12	Giuseppe Maria Castelli	1763	1780	Clement XIII
13	Leonardo Antonelli	1780	1795	Pius VI
14	Giacinto Sigismondo Gerdil	1795	1802	Pius VI
15	Stefano Borgia (Pro-Prefect until 1800)	1798	1800	Pius VI
15	Stefano Borgia (Pro-Prefect until 1800)	1802	1804	Pius VII
16	Antonio Dugnani	1804	1805	Pius VII
17	Michele di Pietro	1805	1814	Pius VII
18	Lorenzo Litta	1814	1818	Pius VII
19	Francesco Luigi Fontana	1818	1822	Pius VII
20	Ercole Consalvi	1822	1824	Pius VII
21	Giulio Maria della Somaglia; Pro-Prefect	1824	1826	Leo XII
22	Mauro Capellari (elected as Pope Gregory XVI)	1826	1831	Leo XII
23	Carlo Maria Pedicini	1831	1834	Gregory XVI
24	Giacomo Filippo Fransoni	1834	1856	Gregory XVI
25	Alessandro Barnabò	1856	1874	Pius IX
26	Alessandro Franchi	1874	1878	Pius IX
27	Giovanni Simeoni	1878	1892	Leo XIII
28	Mieczysław Halka; Ledóchowski	1892	1902	Leo XIII
29	Girolamo Maria Gotti	1902	1916	Leo XIII
30	Domenico Serafini	1916	1918	Benedict XV
31	Willem van Rossum	1918	1932	Pius XI
32	Pietro Fumasoni Biondi	1933	1960	Pius XI
33	Samuel Stritch; Pro-Prefect	1958	1958	Pius XII
34	Gregorio Pietro Agagianian (Pro-Prefect until 1960)	1958	1960	Pius XII
34	Gregorio Pietro Agagianian (Pro-Prefect until 1960)	1960	1970	John XXIII
35	Agnelo Rossi	1970	1984	Paul VI
36	Dermot J. Ryan; Pro-Prefect	1984	1985	John Paul II
37	Jozef Tomko	1985	2001	John Paul II
38	Crescenzio Sepe	2001	2006	John Paul II
39	Ivan Dias	2006	2011	Benedict XVI
40	Fernando Filoni	2011	2019	Benedict XVI
41	Luis Antonio Tagle	2019	2022	Francis

=== Secretaries ===
The secretary assists the cardinal-prefect in the day-to-day running of the congregation and is always an archbishop. They usually go on to hold a position in the Roman Curia that brings them membership to the College of Cardinals.

- Francesco Ingoli (1622–1649).
- Dionisio Massari (1649–1657).
- Mario Alberizzi (1657–1668).
- Federico Baldeschi Colonna, Arch. Caesarien. (1668–1673).
- Francesco Ravizza, Arch. Laodicen. (1673–1675).
- Urbano Cerri (1675–1679).
- Odoardo Cibo, Patr. Constantinop. (1680–1695).
- Carlo Agostino Fabroni (1695–1706).
- Antonio Banchieri (1706–1707).
- Silvio de' Cavalieri, Arch. Athenarum. (1707–1717).
- Pier Luigi Carafa, Arch. Larissen. (1717–1724).
- Bartolomeo Ruspoli (1724–1730).
- Niccolò Forteguerri (1730–1735).
- Filippo Maria Monti (1735–1743).
- Niccolò Maria Lercari (1743–1757).
- Nicolò Maria Antonelli (1757–1759).
- Mario Marefoschi (1759–1770).
- Stefano Borgia (1770–1789).
- Antonio Felice Zondadari, Arch. Adanen. (1789–1795).
- Cesare Brancadoro, Arch. Niaiben. (1796–1801).
- Domenico Coppola, Arch. Myren. (1801–1808).
- Giovanni Battista Quarantotti (1808–1816).
- Carlo Maria Pedicini (1816–1822).
- Pietro Caprano, Arch. Iconien. (1823–1828).
- Castruccio Castracane degli Antelminelli (1829–1833).
- Angelo Mai (1833–1838).
- Ignazio Giovanni Cadolini, Arch. Spoletanus. (1838–1843).
- Giovanni Brunelli (1843–1847).
- Alessandro Barnabò (1848–1856).
- Gaetano Bedini, Arch. Thebarum. (1856–1861).
- Annibale Capalti (1861–1868).
- Giovanni Simeoni (1868–1875).
- Giovanni Battista Agnozzi (1877–1879).
- Ignazio Masotti (1879–1882).
- Domenico Jacobini, Arch. Tyrem. (1882–1891).
- Ignatius Persico, Arch. Tamiathen. (1891–1893).
- Agostino Ciasca, Arch. Larissen. (1893–1899).
- Luigi Veccia (1899–1911).
- Camillo Laurenti (1911–1921)
- Pietro Fumasoni Biondi (1921–1922)
- Francesco Marchetti Selvaggiani (1922–1930)
- Carlo Salotti (1930–1935)
- Celso Costantini (1935–1953)
- Pietro Sigismondi (27 September 1954 – 25 May 1967)
- Bernardin Gantin (26 February 1973 – 19 December 1975)
- Duraisamy Simon Lourdusamy (19 December 1975 – 30 October 1985)
- José Tomás Sánchez (30 October 1985 – 21 June 1991)
- Giuseppe Uhac (21 June 1991 – 18 January 1998)
- Marcello Zago, O.M.I. (28 March 1998 – 1 March 2001)
- Robert Sarah (1 October 2001 – 7 October 2010)
- Savio Hon Tai-Fai (29 December 2010 – 28 September 2017)
- Protase Rugambwa (9 November 2017 – 13 April 2023)

=== Adjunct Secretaries ===
The adjunct secretary, when one is appointed, is concurrently President of the Pontifical Mission Societies.

- Albert Malcolm Ranjith Patabendige Don (1 October 2001 – 2005.12.10)
- Henryk Hoser, S.A.C. (22 January 2005 – 24 May 2008)
- Piergiuseppe Vacchelli (24 May 2008 – 26 June 2012)
- Giampietro Del Toso (9 November 2017 – 21 January 2023)
- Samuele Sangalli (1 October 2024 – )

=== Undersecretary ===
- Charles Asa Schleck (1995–2000)

=== Delegate of the Administration ===
- Msgr. Angelo Mottola (Italy; later Archbishop) (1986 – 1999.07.16)

== See also ==
- Pontifical Urban University
- Protectorate of missions
- Propaganda
