= Alessandro Tanara =

Italian Roman Catholic cardinal

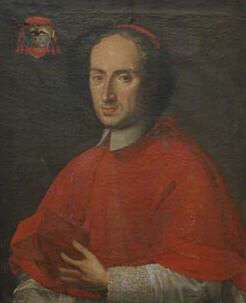
Alessandro Tanara

Alessandro Tanara (1680–1754) was an Italian Roman Catholic cardinal.

He was born in Bologna to the aristocratic Tanara family. Alessandro came to Rome in 1696 to study and work with the mentorship of his uncle, Cardinal Sebastiano Antonio Tanara. In 1743, after being auditore della Rota (auditor of the apostolic tribunal) for ten years, he was made cardinal by Pope Benedict XIV. He wrote a manuscript on the decisions of his court Sacrae Rotae Romana Decisiones.
