= Alessandro Mattei =

Italian Cardinal

His Eminence Alessandro Mattei
- Cardinal-Bishop of Ostia e Velletri
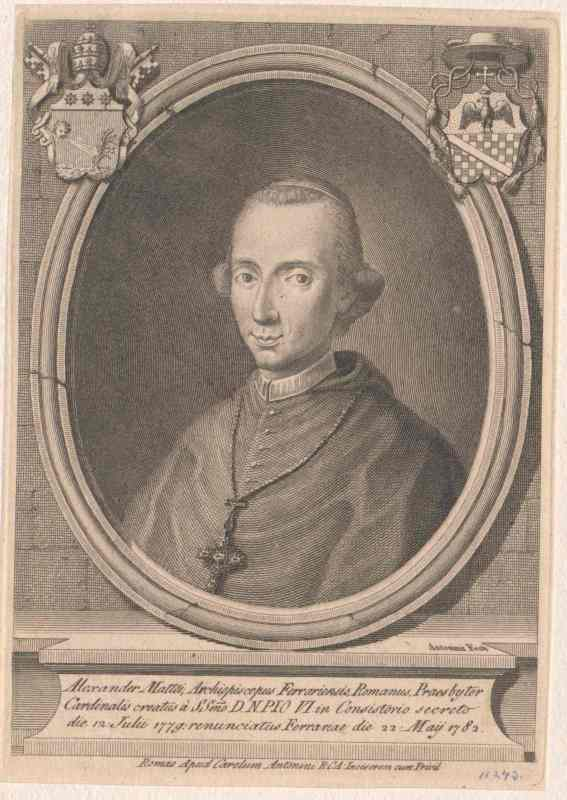
- See: Ostia e Velletri
- Appointed: 26 September 1814
- Term ended: 20 April 1820
- Predecessor: Leonardo Antonelli
- Successor: Giulio Maria della Somaglia
- Other post: Archpriest of Saint Peter's Basilica
- Previous posts: Archbishop of Ferrara (1777–1800); Cardinal-Priest of Santa Balbina (1782–1786); Cardinal-Priest of Santa Maria in Ara Coeli (1786–1800); Cardinal-Bishop of Palestrina (1800–1809); Cardinal-Bishop of Porto e Santa Rufina (1809–1814)

Orders
- Ordination: 27 February 1768
- Consecration: 23 February 1777 by Bernardino Giraud
- Created cardinal: 12 July 1779
- Rank: Cardinal-Bishop

Personal details
- Born: 20 February 1744 Rome
- Died: 20 April 1820 (aged 76)
- Denomination: Roman Catholic
- Coat of arms: Alessandro Mattei's coat of arms

Alessandro Mattei (20 February 1744, Rome – 20 April 1820) was an Italian Cardinal, and a significant figure in papal diplomacy of the Napoleonic period. He was from the Roman aristocratic House of Mattei.

He became Archbishop of Ferrara in 1777, and was named cardinal in 1779.

He became Bishop of Palestrina in 1800, Bishop of Porto-Santa Rufina in 1809, and Bishop of Ostia in 1814. From 1817 to his death, he was archpriest of St Peter's Basilica.

== Episcopal succession ==
Ordination history of Alessandro Mattei
History
Episcopal consecration
- Consecrated by: Bernardino Giraud
Episcopal succession
Bishops consecrated by Alessandro Mattei as principal consecrator
- Pietro Francesco Galleffi: 12 September 1819

Cardinal Bernardino Giraud consecrated Mattei to the episcopacy on 23 February 1777. Having himself consecrated Pietro Francesco Galleffi to the episcopacy, Cardinal Mattei is in the episcopal lineage of Pope Francis.

== Notes ==
Catholic Church titles
Preceded by Leonardo Antonelli	Cardinal-Bishop of Palestrina; 2 April 1800 – 27 March 1809	Succeeded by Aurelio Roverella
Preceded by Luigi Valenti Gonzaga	Cardinal-Bishop of Porto e Santa Rufina; 27 March 1809 – 26 September 1814	Succeeded by Giuseppe Maria Doria Pamphilj
Preceded by Leonardo Antonelli	Bishop of Ostia; 26 September 1814 – 20 April 1820	Succeeded by Giulio Maria della Somaglia
Preceded by Leonardo Antonelli	Dean of the College of Cardinals; 26 September 1814 – 20 April 1820	Succeeded by Giulio Maria della Somaglia
