= Sebastiano Antonio Tanara =

Italian cardinal

- Cardinal-Bishop of Ostia and Velletri
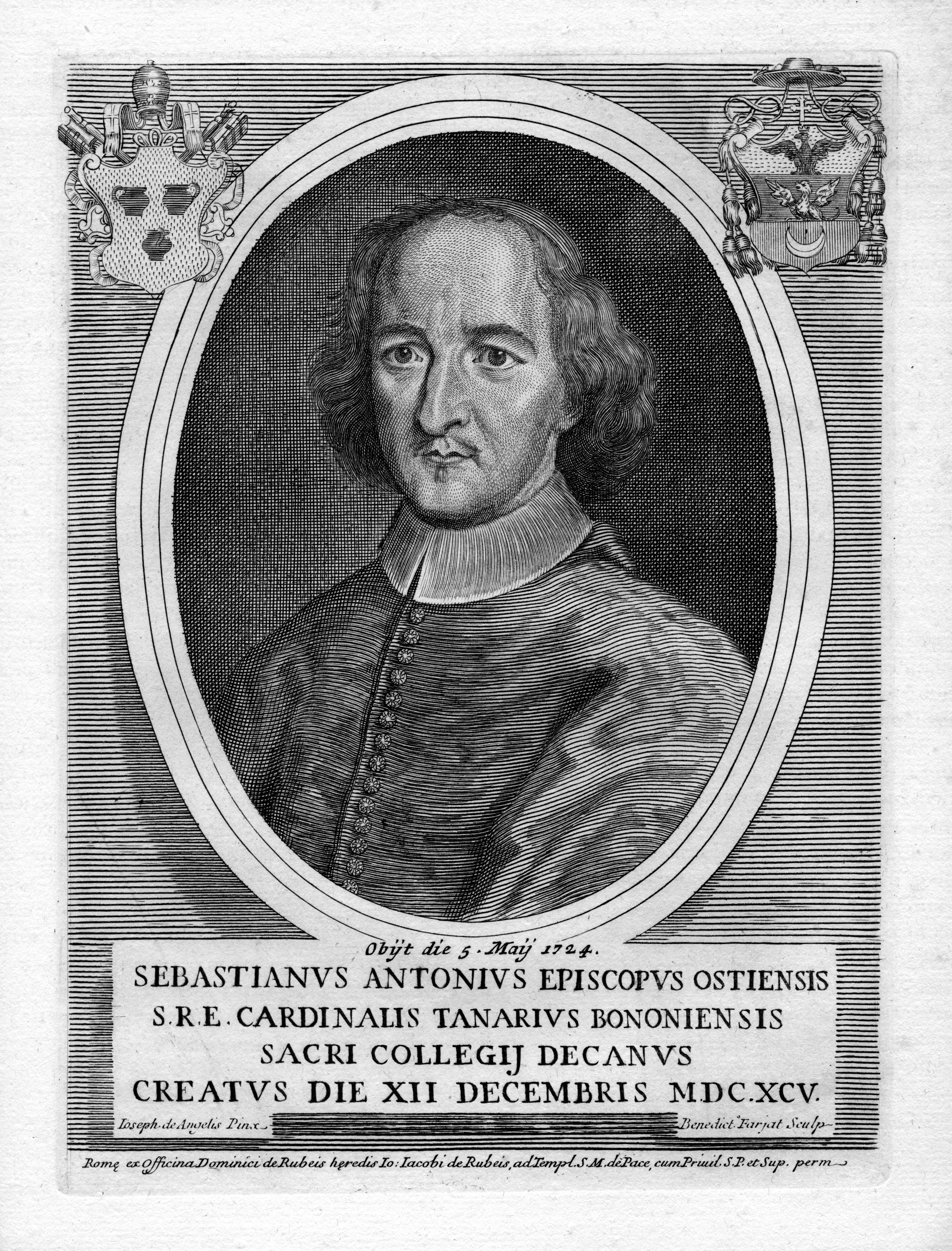
- Church: Catholic Church
- Diocese: Suburbicarian Diocese of Ostia and Velletri
- In office: 3 March 1721 – 5 May 1724
- Predecessor: Fulvio Astalli
- Successor: Francesco del Giudice
- Other post: Abbot of Nonantola (1696-1724)
- Previous posts: Cardinal-Bishop of Frascati (1715-1721); Cardinal-Priest of Santi Quattro Coronati (1696-1715); Apostolic Nuncio to the Holy Roman Emperor (1692-1696); Apostolic Nuncio to Portugal (1690-1692); Apostolic Nuncio to Cologne (1692-1696); Titular Archbishop of Damascus (1687-1696)

Orders
- Consecration: 13 July 1687 by Alphonse de Berghes
- Created cardinal: 12 December 1695 by Pope Innocent XII

Personal details
- Born: 10 April 1650 Rome, Papal States
- Died: 5 May 1724 (aged 74) Rome, Papal States

Sebastiano Antonio Tanara (10 April 1650 – 5 May 1724) was an Italian cardinal.

He studied law at the university of Bologna. He was internuncio in Flanders (1675-1687) and as, such, he was sent with secret mission to king James II of England, who had converted to Catholicism. In 1687 he was consecrated titular archbishop of Damasco and then served as papal nuncio in Cologne (1687–90), Portugal (1690–92) and Austria (1692–96). Pope Innocent XII created him Cardinal Priest in December 1695 and assigned to him the title of SS. IV Coronati on 21 May 1696. He participated in the Papal conclave, 1700. New Pope Clement XI named him Prefect of the S.C. of the Ecclesiestical Immunities. He was also legate in Urbino for twelve years (1703–15). Bishop of the suburbicarian sees of Frascati (1 April 1715) and Ostia e Velletri (3 March 1721). Dean of the Sacred College of Cardinals 1721-24; as such, he presided over Papal conclave, 1721. He died during sede vacante after the death of Pope Innocent XIII.

He was the uncle and mentor of the Alessandro Tanara (1680-1754), who was elevated to the cardinalate in 1743. Tanara donated scientific instruments to the Observatory of Bologna.
