= Fulvio Astalli =

Italian Catholic Cardinal and Bishop

His Eminence Fulvio Astalli
- Cardinal-Bishop of Ostia
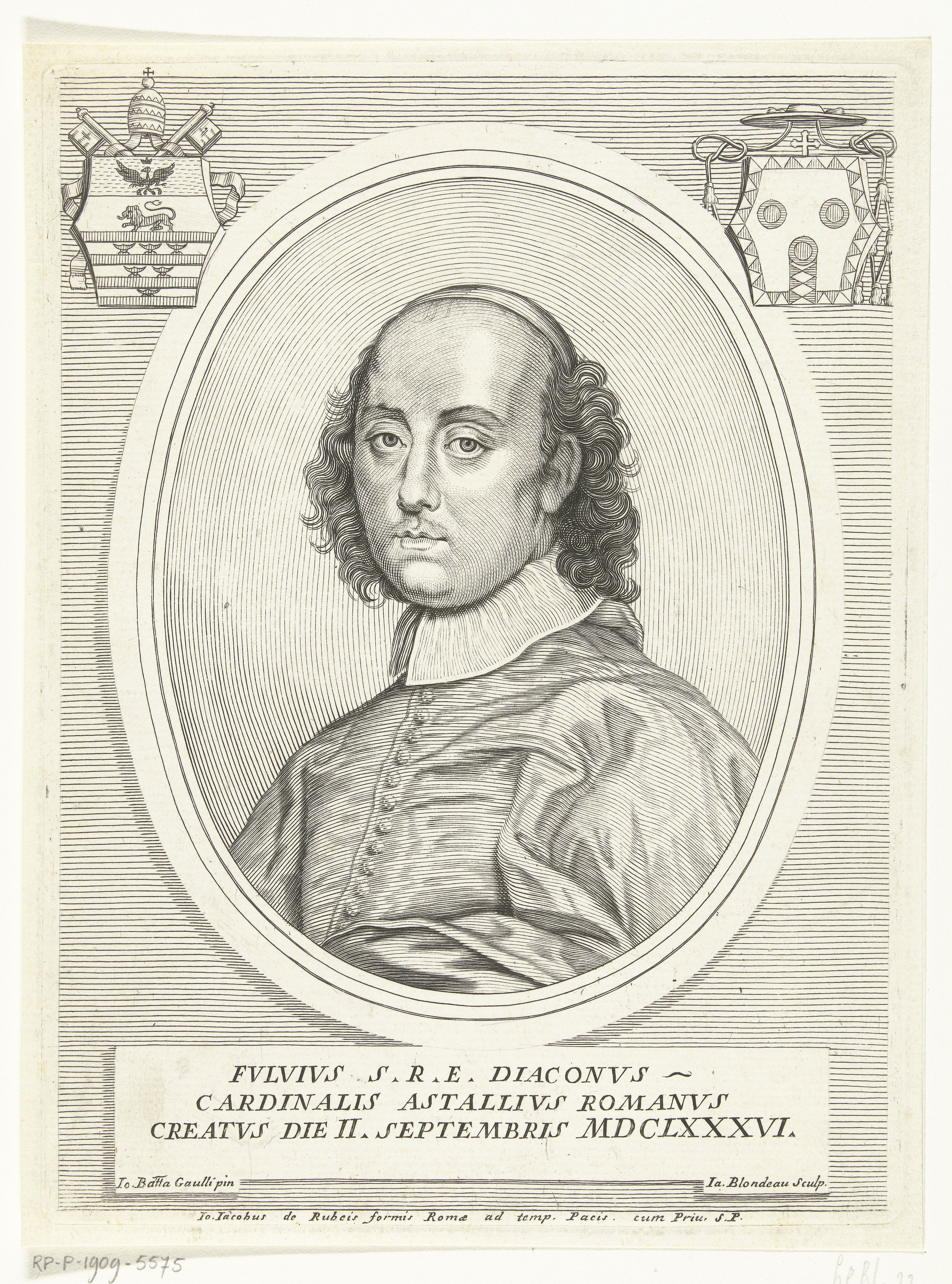
- Church: Catholic Church
- Appointed: 26 April 1719
- Term ended: 14 January 1721
- Predecessor: Nicolò Acciaioli
- Successor: Sebastiano Antonio Tanara
- Other posts: Dean of the College of Cardinals (1719-1721)
- Previous posts: Cardinal-Deacon of San Giorgio in Velabro (1686–1688); Cardinal-Priest of San Pietro in Vincoli (1710–1714); Cardinal-Bishop of Sabina (1714–1719)

Orders
- Consecration: 13 May 1714 by Pope Clement XI
- Created cardinal: 2 September 1686 by Pope Innocent XI
- Rank: Cardinal-Bishop

Personal details
- Born: 29 July 1655 Sambuci, Papal States
- Died: 14 January 1721 (aged 65) Rome, Papal States
- Buried: Santa Maria in Ara Coeli
- Coat of arms

Fulvio Astalli (Sambuci, Lazio, 29 July 1655 – Rome, 14 January 1721) was an Italian Catholic Cardinal and Bishop. He was Dean of the College of Cardinals between 1719 and 1721.

== Biography ==
Coming from a noble family of Lazio, he was the nephew of Cardinals Francesco Maidalchini and Camillo Astalli-Pamphili. He was a cleric of the Apostolic Camera under Pope Clement X and President of the Arms under Pope Innocent XI.

He was appointed Cardinal by Pope Innocent XI in the consistory of 2 September 1686, with a special dispensation for not having yet obtained his Minor orders at the time of the appointment and for having a relative in the College of Cardinals. He was assigned the title of Cardinal deacon of San Giorgio in Velabro. In May 1688, he opted for the deaconry of Santa Maria in Cosmedin and a little over a year later for that of Santi Cosma e Damiano.

In 1693, he became prefect of the Supreme Tribunal of the Apostolic Signatura and in the same year, he became Papal legate in Urbino, a position he held until 1696.

From 1698 to 1701, he was Papal legate in Ferrara. In 1710, he opted for the title of Cardinal priest of Santi Quirico e Giulitta, a title he left a few months later for that of San Pietro in Vincoli. On 13 May 1714, he was consecrated Bishop directly by Pope Clement XI, after having been appointed Cardinal bishop of Sabina.

On 26 April 1719, he became Dean of the Sacred College and received also the Sees of Ostia and Velletri. He was then also appointed governor of Velletri.

Upon his death, he was buried in the Basilica of Santa Maria in Ara Coeli in Rome.

=== Conclaves ===
During his Cardinalate, Fulvio Astalli participated in three conclaves:

- conclave of 1689, which elected Pope Alexander VIII
- conclave of 1691, which elected Pope Innocent XII
- conclave of 1700, which elected Pope Clement XI

== Sources ==
- Gaspare De Caro, ASTALLI, Fulvio, in Dizionario biografico degli italiani - Volume 4 (1962).
- David M. Cheney, Antonio Fulvio Astalli, in Catholic Hierarchy.
- Salvador Miranda, GALLO, Astalli, Fulvio, on fiu.edu – The Cardinals of the Holy Roman Church, Florida International University.

Catholic Church titles
Preceded by Nicolò Acciaioli]	Dean of the College of Cardinals; 1719 – 1721	Succeeded by Sebastiano Antonio Tanara
