= Ludovico Micara =

Italian cardinal

His Eminence Ludovico Micara O.F.M. Cap.
- Dean of the College of Cardinals
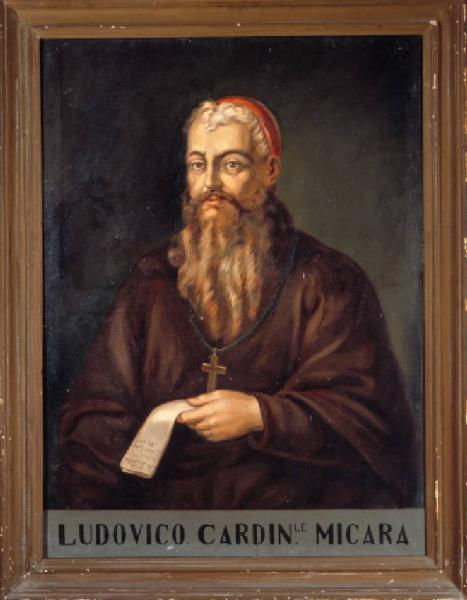
- Church: Roman Catholic Church
- Appointed: 17 June 1844
- Term ended: 24 May 1847
- Predecessor: Bartolomeo Pacca
- Successor: Vincenzo Macchi
- Other posts: Prefect of the Congregation of Ceremonies (1844–47); Cardinal-Bishop of Ostia-Velletri (1844–47)
- Previous posts: Cardinal-Priest of Santi Quattro Coronati (1826–37); Cardinal-Bishop of Frascati (1837–44); Prefect of the Congregation for Rites (1843–44)

Orders
- Ordination: December 1798
- Consecration: 15 October 1837 by Bartolomeo Pacca
- Created cardinal: 20 December 1824 (in pectore); 13 March 1826 (revealed) by Pope Leo XII
- Rank: Cardinal-Priest (1826–37); Cardinal-Bishop (1837–47)

Personal details
- Born: Ludovico Micara; 12 October 1775 Frascati, Papal States
- Baptised: 12 October 1775
- Died: 24 May 1847 (aged 71) Rome, Papal States
- Parents: Gianfilippo Micara; Gaetana Lucidi

Styles of Ludovico Micara
- Reference style: His Eminence
- Spoken style: Your Eminence
- Informal style: Cardinal
- See: Bishop of Ostia

Ludovico Micara (12 October 1775 – 24 May 1847) was an Italian Capuchin and Cardinal. He was born at Frascati, in the Papal States. Ordained in 1798, he became Dean of the College of Cardinals in 1824.

He was in hiding for the end of the Napoleonic Wars period. He became Apostolic Preacher in 1820. He was created cardinal in 1824. He became Bishop of Frascati in 1837 and Bishop of Ostia in 1844.

== Notes ==
Catholic Church titles
Preceded by Emmanuele de Gregorio	Cardinal-Bishop of Frascati; 2 October 1837 – 17 June 1844	Succeeded by Mario Mattei
Preceded by Bartolomeo Pacca	Cardinal-Bishop of Osta e Velletri and Dean of the College of Cardinals; 17 June 1844 – 24 May 1847	Succeeded by Vincenzo Macchi
