= Pietro Francesco Galleffi =

Italian Cardinal

His Eminence Pietro Francesco Galleffi
- Chamberlain of the Apostolic Chamber
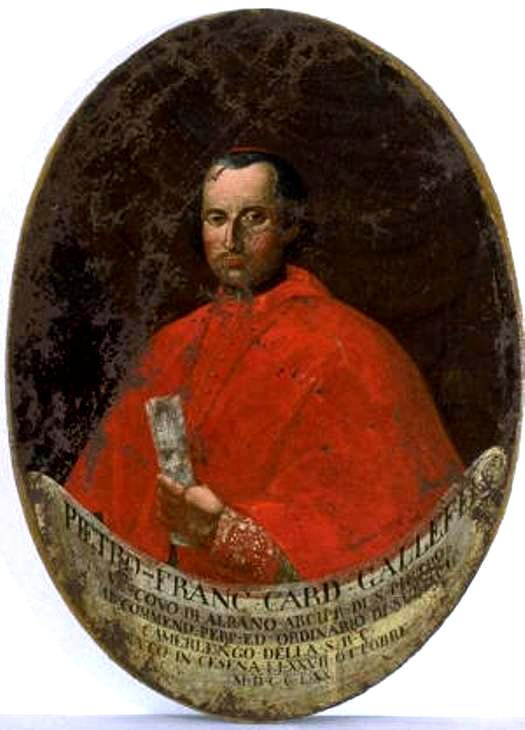
- Appointed: 20 December 1824
- Term ended: 18 June 1837
- Predecessor: Bartolomeo Pacca
- Successor: Giacomo Giustiniani
- Other posts: Cardinal-Bishop of Porto e Santa Rufina; Archpriest of Saint Peter's Basilica
- Previous posts: Cardinal-Priest of San Bartolomeo all’Isola (1803–1820); Secretary of the Roman Curia (1814–1817); Prefect of the Roman Curia (1817–1819); Titular Archbishop of Damascus (1819–1820); Cardinal-Bishop of Albano (1820–1830)

Orders
- Ordination: 22 February 1794
- Consecration: 12 September 1819 by Alessandro Mattei
- Created cardinal: 11 July 1803
- Rank: Cardinal-Bishop

Personal details
- Born: 27 October 1770 Cesena, Papal States
- Died: 18 June 1837 (aged 66)
- Denomination: Roman Catholic

Pietro Francesco Galleffi (Galeffi) (1770–1837) was an Italian Cardinal.

During the Napoleonic period, he was expelled from Rome, in 1798. He was created Cardinal in 1803. He was removed to France, in 1809.

He became titular archbishop of Damasco in 1819, and was Archpriest of St. Peter's Basilica from 1820. From 1824 to 1837 he was Camerlengo. He further signed and notarized the decree of coronation towards the Infant Jesus of Prague, paving the first image of Jesus Christ to be Pontifically crowned by a Pope.

In 1820 he became Bishop of Albano, and in 1830 Bishop of Porto e Santa Rufina.

Galleffi is in the episcopal lineage of Pope Francis.
