= Suburbicarian Diocese of Ostia =

Roman Catholic diocese in Rome, Italy

Suburbicarian Diocese of Ostia Ostia
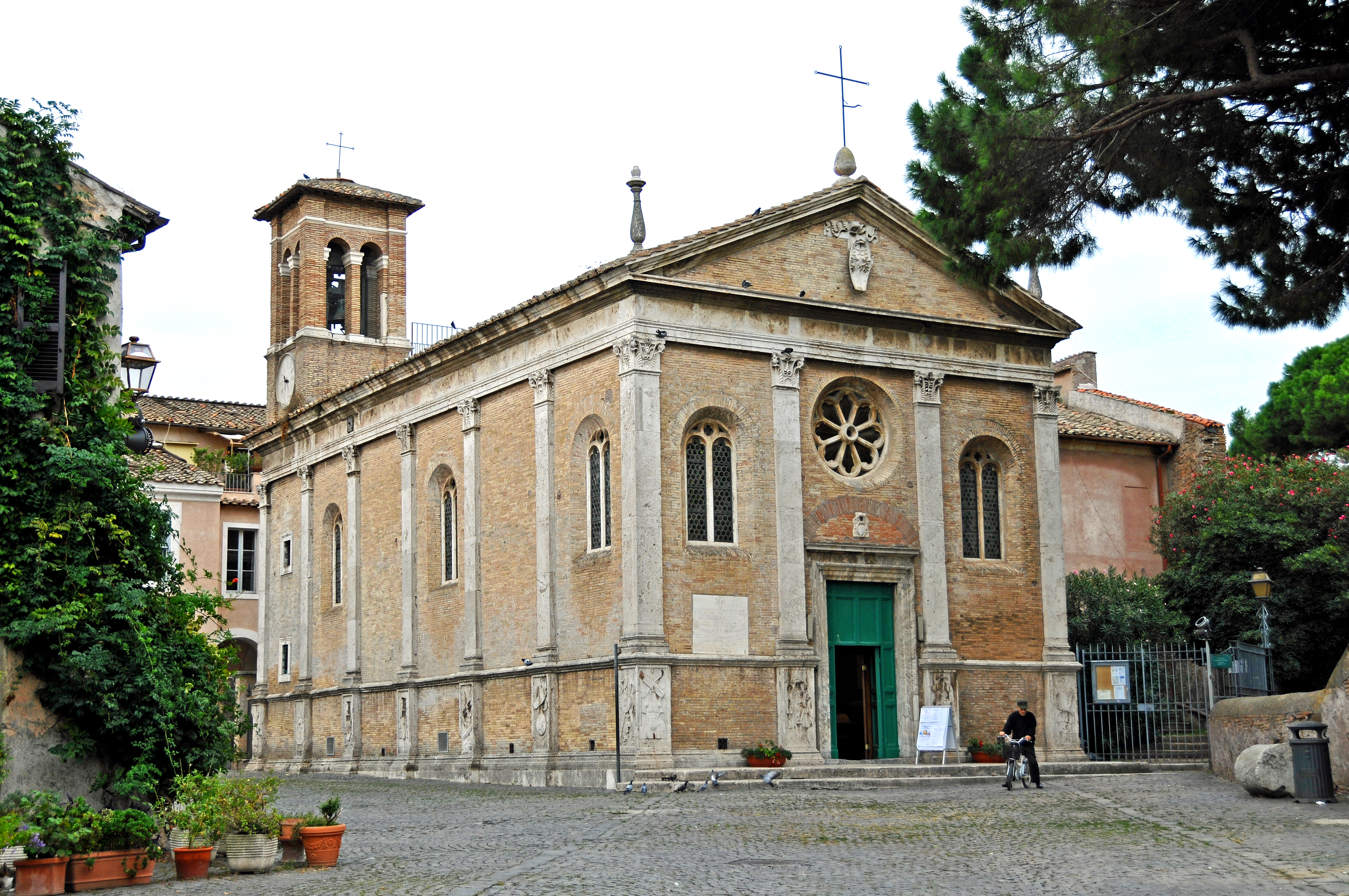
- Cathedral of Santa Aurea

Location
- Country: Italy
- Ecclesiastical province: Rome
- Coordinates: 41°45′34″N 12°18′06″E

Statistics
- Area: 31 km^{2} (12 sq mi)
- Population: Total; Catholics: (as of 2023); 18,500; 15,170 (82%)
- Parishes: 1

Information
- First holder: Maximus
- Formation: AD 259
- Denomination: Catholic Church
- Sui iuris church: Latin Church
- Rite: Roman Rite
- Established: AD 259
- Cathedral: Santa Aurea
- Patron saint: Aurea of Ostia
- Language: Italian

Current leadership
- Pope: Leo XIV
- Bishop: Cardinal Luis Antonio Tagle
- Apostolic Administrator: Baldassare Reina

Map
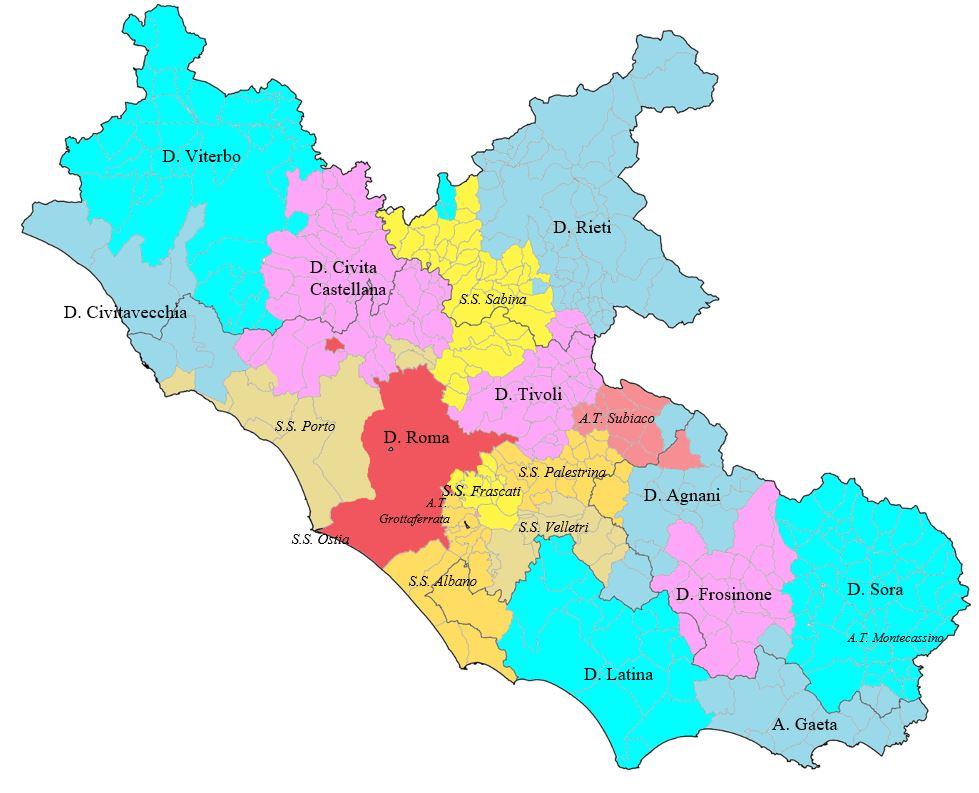
- Ecclesiastical map of Lazio; S.S. (sede suburbicaria) Ostia is to the west of Rome.

The Roman Catholic Suburbicarian Diocese of Ostia is an ecclesiastical territory located within the Metropolitan City of Rome in Italy. It is one of the seven suburbicarian dioceses. The incumbent bishop is Cardinal Luis Antonio Tagle. For centuries, its bishop has been the dean of the College of Cardinals. Its cathedral is Santa Aurea.

From 1105 to 1914, the diocese was merged with the Suburbicarian Diocese of Velletri. In 1962, the Diocese of Ostia was brought under the direct administration of the Diocese of Rome. Its territory is restricted to the single cathedral parish of Santa Aurea.

== Bishops ==
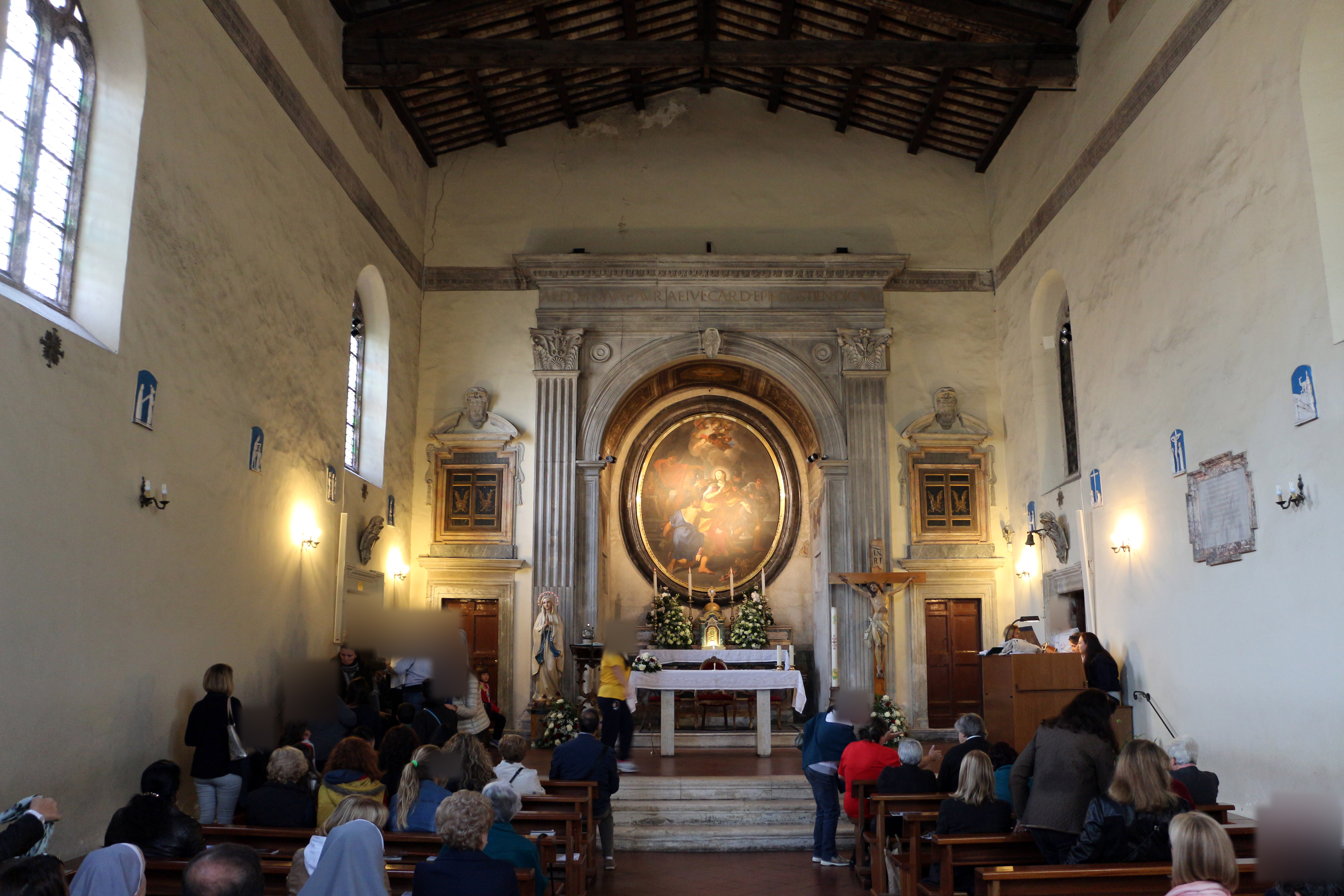
Mass in the interior of the Borgo of Ostia Antica

=== Bishops of Ostia (–1057) ===
- Maximus (259)

...

- Maximus (313)
- Florentius (366)

...

- Bonus (487).
- Bellator (499)
- Aristus (502)

...

- Amabile (649)

...

- Andrea(s) (680)

...

- Sissinio 732 – before 745
- Theodorus (745)
- George I, 753–786

...

- Gregory I, 787 – before 804
- Bernard 804–805
- Peter I 805 – before 826
- Cesareo 826–854
- Megisto (or Leo I), 854–868
- Donatus, 868–870

sede vacante 870–878

- Eugenius, 878–898
- Stephen, 898–900
- Guido I, 900–946
- Benigno, 946–960
- Siccone, 960–963
- Gregory II, 964–969
- Leo II, 969–983

vacant 983–996

- Azzone I, 996
- Gregory III, 998–1012
- Azzone II, 1012–1021
- Peter III, 1021–1037
- Benedict, 1044–1050
- John I, 1050–1058

=== Bishops of Ostia and Velletri (1057–1378) ===
- Peter IV Damiani, 1057–1072
- Gerald of Ostia, 1072–1077
- Odo I de Lagery, 1078–1088 (became Pope Urban II)
- Odo II, 1088–1102
- Leo of Ostia, ca. 1103–1115
- Lamberto Scannabecchi, 1116–1124 (later Pope Honorius II)
- Giovanni of Camaldoli, 1126–1134
- Drogo of Champagne, 1136–1138
- Alberic, 1138–1148
- Guido II de Summa, 1149–1151
- Hugo, 1151–1158
- Ubaldo Allucingoli, 1159–1181/84 (became Pope Lucius III in 1181)
- Theobald, 1184–1188
- Ottaviano di Paoli, 1189–1206
- Ugolino di Conti 1206–1227/31 (became Pope Gregory IX)
- Rinaldo dei Signori di Ienne, 1231–1254/61 (became Pope Alexander IV in 1254)
- Hugh of Saint-Cher 1261–1262
- Enrico Bartolomei 1262–1271

vacant 1271–1273

- Peter VI de Tarentaise, 1273–1276 (later Pope Innocent V, † 1276)
- vacant 1276–1278
- Latino Malabranca Orsini, 1278–1294
- Hugh Aycelin, 1294–1297
  - Leonardo Patrasso, apostolic administrator 1298–1299
- Niccolo I Boccasini, 1300–1303 (became Pope Benedict XI)
- Niccolò Albertini, 1303–1321
- Regnaud de La Porte, 1321–1325

vacant 1325–1327

- Bertrand du Pouget, 1327–1352
- Étienne Aubert, 1352
- Pierre Bertrand de Colombier, 1353–1361
- Andouin Aubert, 1361–1363
- Hélias de Saint-Yrieix, 1363–1367
- Guillaume de la Sudrie, 1367–1373
- Peter d'Estaing, O.S.B. 1373–1377
- Bertrand Lagier, 1378 (sided with Avignon in the Great Schism)

=== Western Schism ===
==== Obedience of Rome (1378–1415) (actually in control of Ostia) ====
- Philippe of Alençon, 1388–1397 (also Cardinal-bishop of Sabina, 1380–1388)
- Angelo Acciaioli, 1405–1408

==== Obedience of Avignon (1378–1429) ====
- Bertrand Lagier (1378–1392)
- John de Neufchatel (1392–1398)
- Leonardo Rossi da Giffoni (1398–1405)
- Jean-Allarmet de Brogny (1405–1408)
- Julian Lobera y Valtierra (1423–1429)

==== Obedience of Pisa (1409–1415) ====
- Jean-Allarmet de Brogny (1409–1415)

=== Bishops of Ostia and Velletri (1415–1914) ===
- Jean-Allarmet de Brogny (1415–1426)
- Antonio Correr, 1431–1445
- Juan de Cervantes (1447–1453)
- Giorgio Fieschi (1455–1461)
- Guillaume d'Estouteville (1461–1483)
- Giuliano della Rovere, became Pope Julius II (1483–1503),
- Oliviero Carafa (1503–1511)
- Raffaele Riario Sansoni (1511–1521)
- Bernardino López de Carvajal (1521–1523)
- Francesco Soderini (1523–1524)
- Niccolò Fieschi (1524)
- Alessandro Farnese, became Pope Paul III(1524–1534)
- Giovanni Piccolomini, 1535–1537
- Giovanni Domenico de Cupis, 1537–1553
- Giovanni Pietro Carafa, 1553–1555
- Jean du Bellay 1555–1560
- François de Tournon, 1560–1562
- Rodolfo Pio da Carpi, 1562–1564
- Francesco Pisani, 1564–1570
- Giovanni Morone, 1570–1580
- Alessandro II Farnese, 1580–1589
- Giovanni Antonio Serbelloni, 1589–1591
- Alfonso Gesualdo, 1591–1603
- Tolomeo Gallio, 1603–1607
- Domenico Pinelli, 1607–1611
- François de Joyeuse, 1611–1615
- Antonio Maria Galli, 1615–1620
- Antonio Maria Sauli, 1620–1623
- Francesco Maria Bourbon del Monte, 1623–1626
- Ottavio Bandini, 1626–1629
- Giovanni Battista Deti, 1629–1630
- Domenico Ginnasi, 1630–1639
- Carlo Emanuele Pio di Savoia, 1639–1641
- Marcello Lante della Rovere, 1641–1652
- Carlo I de Medici, 1652–1666
- Francesco V Barberini, 1666–1679
- Cesare Facchinetti, 1680–1683
- Niccolò Albergati-Ludovisi, 1683–1687
- Alderano Cybo, 1687–1700
- Emmanuel Théodose de la Tour d'Auvergne, 1700–1715
- Nicolò Acciaioli, 1715–1719
- Fulvio Astalli, 1719–1721
- Sebastiano Antonio Tanara, 1721–1724
- Francesco del Giudice, 1724–1725
- Fabrizio Paolucci, 1725–1726
- Francesco Barberini, 1726–1738
- Pietro Ottoboni, 1738–1740
- Tommaso Ruffo, 1740–1753
- Pierluigi Carafa, 1753–1755
- Rainiero d'Elci, 1755–1761
- Giuseppe Spinelli, 1761–1763
- Carlo Alberto Guidoboni Cavalchini, 1763–1774
- Fabrizio Serbelloni, 1774–1775
- Gian Francesco Albani, 1775–1803
- Henry Benedict Stuart, 1803–1807
- Leonardo Antonelli, 1807–1811
- Alessandro Mattei, 1814–1820
- Giulio Maria della Somaglia, 1820–1830
- Bartolomeo Pacca, 1830–1844
- Ludovico Micara, O. Cap., 1844–1847
- Vincenzo Macchi, 1847–1860
- Mario Mattei, 1860–1870
- Costantino Patrizi Naro, 1870–1876
- Luigi Amat di San Filippo e Sorso, 1877–1878
- Camillo di Pietro, 1878–1884
- Carlo Sacconi, 1884–1889
- Raffaele Monaco La Valletta, 1889–1896
- Luigi Oreglia di Santo Stefano, 1896–1913

=== Bishops of Ostia (1914–) ===
- Serafino Vannutelli (1914–1915)
- Vincenzo Vannutelli (1915–1930)
- Granito Pignatelli (1933–1948)
- Francesco Marchetti-Selvaggiani (1948–1951)
- Eugène Tisserant (1951–1972)
- Amleto Giovanni Cicognani (1972–1973)
- Luigi Traglia (1974–1977)
- Carlo Confalonieri (1977–1986)
- Agnelo Rossi (1986–1993)
- Bernardin Gantin (1993-2002)
- Joseph Ratzinger (2002–2005); became Pope Benedict XVI
- Angelo Sodano (2005–2019)
- Giovanni Battista Re (2020–2026)
- Luis Antonio Tagle (2026–)

== See also ==
- Diocese of Rome#Diocese of Ostia
- Roman Catholic Suburbicarian Diocese of Velletri–Segni

== Books ==
- Bräuer, Martin (2014). Handbuch der Kardinäle: 1846–2012 (in German). Berlin: De Gruyter. ISBN 978-3-11-026947-5.
- Brixius, Johannes M. Die Mitglieder des Kardinalskollegiums von 1130-1181, Berlin 1912.
- Cappelletti, Giuseppe (1844). Le chiese d'Italia della loro origine sino ai nostri giorni (in Italian). Vol. primo. Venezia: Giuseppe Antonelli.
- Eubel, Conradus, ed. (1913). Hierarchia catholica, Tomus 1 (second ed.). Münster: Libreria Regensbergiana. (in Latin)
- Eubel, Conradus, ed. (1914). Hierarchia catholica, Tomus 2 (second ed.). Münster: Libreria Regensbergiana. (in Latin)
- Eubel, Conradus; Gulik, Guilelmus, eds. (1923). Hierarchia catholica, Tomus 3 (second ed.). Münster: Libreria Regensbergiana.
- Gams, Pius Bonifatius (1873). Series episcoporum Ecclesiae catholicae: quotquot innotuerunt a beato Petro apostolo (in Latin). Ratisbon: Typis et Sumptibus Georgii Josephi Manz. pp. iv–vii.
- Gauchat, Patritius (1935). Hierarchia catholica Volumen quartum (IV) Münster.
- Giorni, Francesco (1842). Storia di Albano (in Italian). Roma: Puccinelli. p. 372.
- Hüls, Rudolf. Kardinäle, Klerus und Kirchen Roms: 1049–1130, Bibliothek des Deutschen Historischen Instituts in Rom 1977
- Kehr, Paul Fridolin (1907). Italia pontificia (in Latin). Vol. II: Lativm. Berlin: Weidmann. pp. 30–36. ISBN 978-5-88390-446-1.
- Klewitz, Hans-Walter. Reformpapsttum und Kardinalkolleg, Darmstadt 1957.
- Lanzoni, Francesco (1927). Le diocesi d'Italia, dalle origini al principio del secolo VII (anno 604). Volume primo. Faenza: F. Lega.
- Lentz, Harris M. (2009). Popes and Cardinals of the 20th Century: A Biographical Dictionary. Jefferson NC USA: McFarland. ISBN 978-1-4766-2155-5.
- Ritzler, Remigius; Sefrin, Pirminus (1952). Hierarchia catholica medii et recentis aevi V (1667-1730). Patavii: Messagero di S. Antonio. (in Latin)
- Ritzler, Remigius; Sefrin, Pirminus (1958). Hierarchia catholica medii et recentis aevi VI (1730–1799). Patavii: Messagero di S. Antonio. (in Latin)
- Ughelli, Ferdinando; Coleti, Niccolò (1717). Italia sacra sive De Episcopis Italiae, et insularum adjacentium (in Latin). Vol. Tomus primus (1) (editio secunda, aucta et emendata ed.). Venice: apud Sebastianum Coleti. pp. 47–88.
