= Nicolò Maria Antonelli =

Italian Cardinal

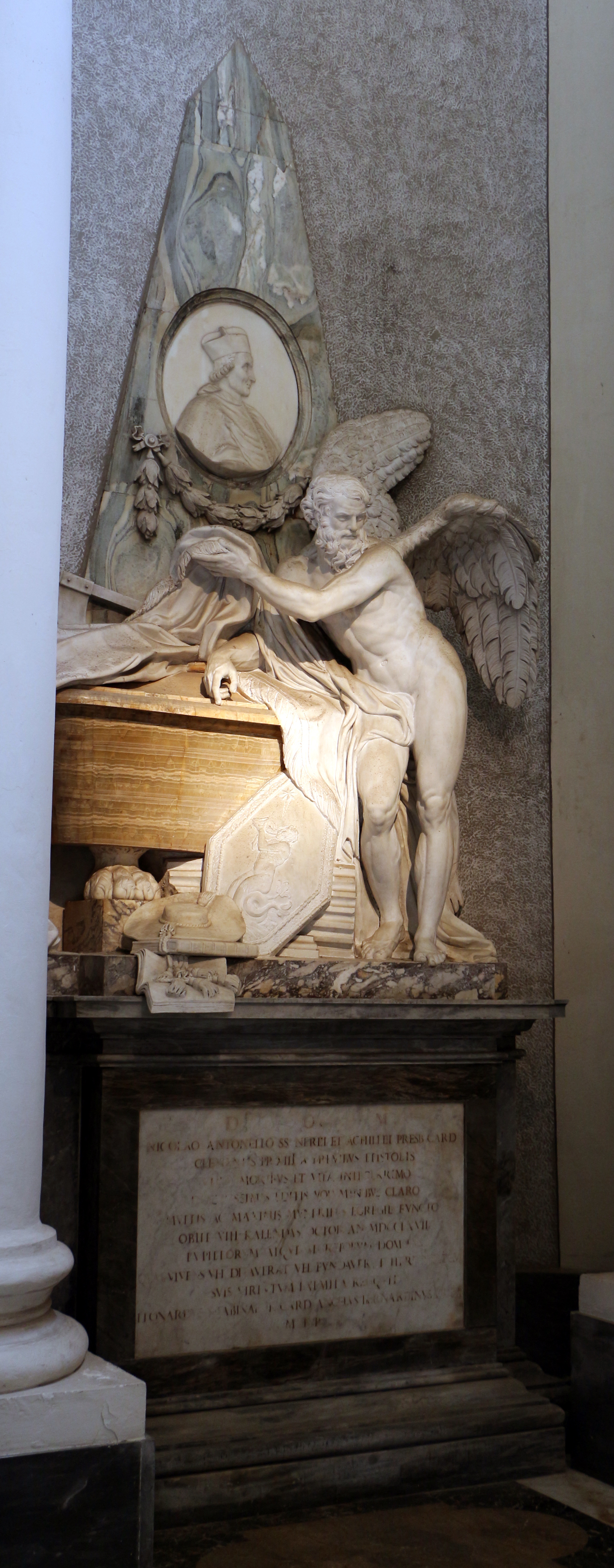
Grave in the Lateran

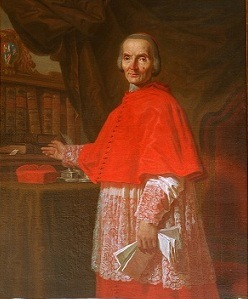
Photo of Nicolo Maria

Nicolò Maria Antonelli (8 July 1698 – 25 September 1767) was an Italian Cardinal in the Roman Catholic Church, a learned canonist, ecclesiastical historian, and Orientalist.

Antonelli was born in Senigallia. He wrote De Titulis Quos S. Evaristus Presbyteris Romanis Distribuit (Rome, 1725), in defense of the parochial character of the primitive Roman churches. He also edited (and defended) the commentary of St. Athanasius on the Psalms, sermons of St. James of Nisibis, and under the name of Emman. S.J. de Azovedo, Vetus Missale Romanum Monasticum Lateranense (1752).

Antonelli was the uncle of Cardinal Leonardo Antonelli.
