= Leonardo Antonelli =

Italian Cardinal

His Eminence Leonardo Antonelli
- Dean of the College of Cardinals
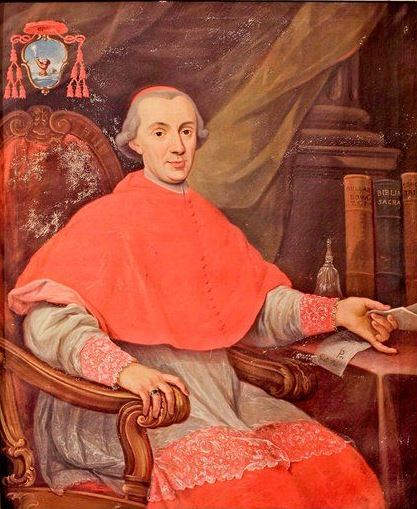
- Portrait of Cardinal Antonelli, 18th century
- Church: Catholic Church
- Appointed: 3 August 1807
- Term ended: 23 January 1811
- Predecessor: Henry Benedict Stuart
- Successor: Alessandro Mattei
- Other posts: Cardinal-Bishop of Ostia (1807-1811)
- Previous posts: Cardinal-Priest of Santa Sabina (1775–1794); Cardinal-Bishop of Palestrina (1794–1800)

Orders
- Ordination: 1764
- Consecration: 19 March 1794 by Gian Francesco Albani
- Created cardinal: 24 April 1775 by Pope Pius VI
- Rank: Cardinal-Bishop

Personal details
- Born: 6 November 1730 Senigallia, Italy
- Died: 23 January 1811 (aged 80) Senigallia, Italy

Leonardo Antonelli (6 November 1730 – 23 January 1811) was an Italian Catholic cardinal.

== Biography ==
A native of Senigallia, Antonelli was the nephew of Cardinal Nicolò Maria Antonelli. During the early part of his long diplomatic career, he held, among other offices, those of canon of the Vatican Basilica, Prefect of archives in the Castle of San Angelo, Secretary of the Sacred College and Assessor of the Holy Office. He was created Cardinal-Priest of Santa Sabina by Pope Pius VI in the consistory of 24 April 1775, and later Dean of the Sacred College and Cardinal Bishop of Ostia-Velletri.

At the time of the French Revolution, with a view to preventing the suspension of church services, he lent his support to the vote for the civil constitution of the French clergy, decreed by the National Assembly of France (12 July 1790).

In addition to the responsible posts already mentioned, he filled those of grand penitentiary, prefect of the Signature of Justice and of the Congregation of the Index, and pro-secretary of Briefs. He assisted in the preparation of the Concordat, and was present at the election of Pope Pius VII in 1800, whom he later accompanied to Paris in 1804. He participated in the Coronation of Napoleon Bonaparte as Emperor of the French.

In 1808, he was banished from Rome by the French to Spoleto and later to Sinigaglia, where he died, leaving to the Congregation of Propaganda bequests for the support of twelve Armenian students in the College of Urbano.

Though Antonelli has been criticized for arrogating to the papacy too arbitrary a civil power, a perusal of his letter to the bishops of Ireland reveals a more tolerant spirit than is generally attributed to him. Possessed of a rich library, he was the friend and protector of letters, and had as librarian, the learned Francesco Cancellieri. He also acquired some fame as an archaeologist.

Catholic Church titles
Preceded by Rainiero d'Elci	Cardinal-Priest of Santa Sabina; 29 May 1775 – 21 February 1794	Succeeded by Giulio Maria della Somaglia
Preceded by Marcantonio Colonna	Cardinal-Bishop of Palestrina; 21 February 1794 – 2 April 1800	Succeeded by Alessandro Mattei
Preceded by Carlo Rezzonico	Cardinal-Bishop of Porto e Santa Rufina; 92 April 1800 – 23 January 1811	Succeeded by Luigi Valenti Gonzaga
Preceded by Henry Benedict Stuart	Cardinal-Bishop of Osta e Velletri and Dean of the College of Cardinals; 3 August 1807 – 23 January 1811	Succeeded by Alessandro Mattei
