= Luigi Valenti Gonzaga =

Swiss cardinal (1725–1808)

- Cardinal-Bishop of Porto and Santa Rufina
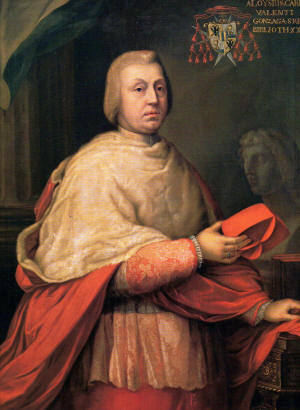
- Church: Catholic Church
- Diocese: Suburbicarian Diocese of Porto and Santa Rufina
- In office: 3 August 1807 – 29 December 1808
- Predecessor: Leonardo Antonelli
- Successor: Alessandro Mattei
- Other post: Librarian of the Vatican (1802-1808)
- Previous posts: Prefect of the Congregation of Ecclesiastical Immunity (1793-1800); Cardinal-Bishop of Albano (1795-1807)Cardinal-Priest of Santi Nereo ed Achilleo (1790-1795); Cardinal-Priest of Sant'Agnese fuori le mura (1778-1790); Apostolic Nuncio to Spain (1773-1778); Apostolic Nuncio to Switzerland (1764-1773); Titular Archbishop of Caesarea in Cappadocia (1764-1778)

Orders
- Ordination: 29 June 1764
- Consecration: 25 July 1764 by Pope Clement XIII
- Created cardinal: 1776 by Pope Pius VI

Personal details
- Born: 15 October 1725 Roveredo, Grey League, Three Leagues, Swiss Confederacy
- Died: 29 December 1808 (aged 83)

Luigi Valenti Gonzaga (15 October 1725 – 29 December 1808) was a cardinal of the Catholic Church. He was elected to the Roman Curia and the Papal diplomacy, and was also nuntius of Switzerland and Spain.

Valenti Gonzaga was born at Roveredo, in what is now the province of Mantua. He was made cardinal in pectore in April 1776 by Pope Pius VI, published in May 1776. He was made Cardinal-Priest of Sant'Agnese fuori le mura in 1778.

He took part in the 1799–1800 Conclave as chosen by Pope Pius VII.

He was State Secretary in 1740 and was later prefect for the Congregation for the Evangelization of Peoples from 1747.

He was the nephew of Cardinal Silvio Valenti Gonzaga (created 1738) and also related to Cesare Guerrieri Gonzaga (created 1738). He died at Viterbo. He commissioned the architect Camillo Morigia to design a monument to cover the tomb of Dante Alighieri in Ravenna, completed in 1781.
