= Apostolic Chancery =

Former office of the Roman Curia

The Apostolic Chancery (Latin: Cancellaria Apostolica; also known as the "Papal" or "Roman Chanc(ell)ery") was a dicastery of the Roman Curia at the service of the pope. The principal and presiding official was the Grand Chancellor of the Holy Roman Church, who was always the cardinal-priest of the Basilica di San Lorenzo in Damaso. The principal function of the office was to collect money to maintain the Papal army and to produce documents and correspondence for the pope. Pope Pius VII reformed the office when Emperor Napoleon I of France obviated the need for Papal armies. In the early 20th century the office collected money for missionary work. Pope Paul VI abolished the Apostolic Chancellary on 27 February 1973, transferring its functions to the Secretariat of State.

== History ==
=== Before 1908 ===
The role of bibliotecarius first appears in 781, and was responsible for the pope's books as well as redacting documents. The role of cancellarius first appears under Silvester II. The cancellarius produced documents for the pope, while the bibliotecarius would date them. Subsequently, both roles tended to be filled by the same person. The use of the term bibliotecarius ended under Celestine II (1143–1144). From Honorius III (1216–1227) onwards the head of the chancery was called the vicecancellarius.

The Cancellaria Apostolica was of ancient origin in its essence, but it derived its name from that of civil "chanceries", including that of the Imperial Chancery. The primacy of the Roman pontiff required that he have in his service officials to write and transmit his answers to the numerous petitions for favours and consultations addressed to him. Throughout its duration the office was reformed numerous times.

The Apostolic constitution Etsi ad Singula of Pope Clement VII of 5 July 1532 provided the cardinalatial title of the Basilica di San Lorenzo in Damaso to the chancellor.

After Pope Martin V had instituted a large number of offices in the Cancellaria, Pope Sixtus V placed many of them in the class of "vacabili", i. e. venal offices (a practice also of secular courts, e. g. those of France, even under the absolutist King Louis XIV). The reclassification of many of the offices of the Cancellaria as vacabili was motivated by the need of the pope for money. The pope was often compelled to defend the Church by waging war, equipping martial expeditions, or at least financially assisting the princes who waged such wars at his exhortation, but the Papal treasury was often insufficient to defray even the expenses of the Papal States. Accordingly, the popes resorted to the expedient of selling several lucrative offices of the Roman Curia to the highest bidder; however, these sales were not of the offices per se, but of the receipts of the offices, e. g., the taxes paid for the favours that were granted through the pertinent office.

Some of the offices that Pope Sixtus V classified as vacabili were of minor importance and therefore did not require special competence were sold with a grant of the right of succession to the heirs of the purchaser. Offices that entailed grave obligations and for which only pious and learned men were eligible were sold without this right and therefore reverted to the Roman Curia on the death of the purchaser. An aleatory contract, therefore, was formed, its uncertainties being the amount of the income of the office and the length of the life of the purchaser. The prices of the offices, especially of the more desirable ones, were considerable: Lorenzo Corsini, afterwards Pope Clement XII, bought the office of regent of the Cancellaria for 30,000 Roman scudi, a large fortune at the time. The disadvantage of these uncertainties might not be confined to the purchaser because he was free to condition the purchased office on the life of another designated person, named the "intestatary". The purchaser was also permitted to substitute a different intestatary if this substitution was expressed 40 days before the death of the immediately preceding intestatary.

Other offices that Pope Sixtus V classified as vacabili were of greater importance, including that of Regent and those of the 25 solicitors, 12 notaries, and auditors of the Causes of the Holy Palace. Pope Sixtus V assigned the liberal proceeds of these sales as part of the remuneration of the cardinal vice chancellor of the Cancellaria (see below), but later Pope Innocent XI rescinded them and assigned the revenue to the Apostolic Camera. Pope Alexander VIII restored the revenue to the vice chancellor, who at that time was his nephew Pietro Ottoboni.

The authority of the vice chancellor increased when in 1690 Pope Alexander VIII added to his office that of Compiler (Sommista) in perpetuity.

The government of Emperor Napoleon I of France redeemed many of the vacabili, which resulted in few remaining. Pope Pius VII, after his return to Rome, reformed the Cancellaria and decreased its offices. But as he granted to the vacabili the privilege that, by a legal fiction, time of their tenures was regarded as not having transpired ("quod tempus et tempera non currant"), and many proprietors of vacabili having had obtained grants of sopravivevza, by which deceased intestataries were regarded to be alive, some offices remained vacabili nominally, but not factually. Finally, in 1901 Pope Leo XIII suppressed all the vacabili offices and ordered his pro-datary to redeem them, when necessary substituting the office of the Apostolic Datary for their proprietors.

=== 1908–1973 ===
The Apostolic constitution Sapienti Consilio of Pope Pius X of 29 June 1908 reduced the Cancellaria Apostolica to a forwarding office (Ufficio di Spedizione) consisting only of the cardinal chancellor, regent, apostolic prothonotaries, a notary, a secretary and archivist, a protocolist, and four amanuenses. The majority of the minor offices of the Cancellaria were suppressed and its faculties were reduced only to the expedition of Papal bulls for Consistorial benefices, erection of new dioceses and chapters, and other more important ecclesiastical affairs that required various forms of apostolic letters. Thus Pius X restored the title of "Chancellor of Holy Roman Church" from the previous "Vice Chancellor" (see section below). The cardinalatial title of the chancellor remained the Basilica di San Lorenzo in Damaso, as it had been since 5 July 1532. However, the chancellor retained little of his former authority. He acted as notary of the cardinalatial consistories and directed the office of the Cancellaria Apostolica.

Finally, the motu proprio Quo Aptius of Pope Paul VI of 27 February 1973 completely suppressed the Cancellaria Apostolica.

== Office of chancellor ==
=== Title of the office ===
Prior to the Apostolic constitution Etsi ad Singula of Pope Clement VII of 5 July 1532, the presiding cardinal of the Cancellaria was titled "Vice Chancellor". Scholars writing of the Cancellaria provided many ingenious reasons why that dignitary did not have the more obvious title of "Chancellor". The Italian jurist Giovanni Battista Cardinal De Luca regarded these explanations as senseless (simplicitates et fabulae) and proposed an explanation of his own, without insisting on its correctness: it was probable that the title of "Vice Chancellor" arose in the same way as the title of "Prodatary" ("Prodatarius"), the custom having been to title the principal of the Dataria Apostolica the "Datary" ("Datarius") if he were not a cardinal, and the "Prodatary" ("Prodatarius") if he were. The rationale for the titular customs of the Dataria was that the office of Datary was not in essence cardinalatial but rather of minor dignity; wherefore it was improper to entitle a cardinal with "Datary". The same custom still obtains in the case of an apostolic nuncio who is elevated to the cardinalate: he retains his office for a time, but with the title of "Pro Nuncio". This theory of De Luca is not certain, but is at least probable. Etsi ad Singula prescribed that the principal of the Cancellaria be titled "Chancellor", which was proper because the office had been occupied for centuries by cardinals. For the rest, the office in question was always regarded as one of the most dignified and important of the Roman Curia, as is evident from Moroni's account of the funeral of Cardinal Alexander Farnese, Vice Chancellor and Archpriest of the Basilica di San Pietro in Vaticano.

=== Residence and titular basilica ===
The most splendid occupant of the office of Chancellor was the future Pope Leo X, who received as residence from his successor Pope Clement VII the Palazzo Riario, long known as the "Cancellaria Apostolica", where he remained. His former residence was in the Palazzo Borgia, from which he moved to the Palazzo Sforza Cesarini, the latter palace being, on this account, long known as the "Cancellaria Vecchia". The removal of the residence and office of the Vice Chancellor to the majestic Palazzo Riario in the Campo di Fiori was due to the confiscation of the property of Cardinal Raffaele Riario for his share, with Cardinals Petrucci, Sacchi, Soderini, and Castellesi, in a conspiracy against the life of Pope Leo X.

Contiguous to the Cancellaria qua edifice, in fact forming part of it, is the Basilica di San Lorenzo in Damaso. When Pope Clement VII assigned this palace as the perpetual residence of the Vice Chancellor, he provided that the Vice Chancellor should always have the title of the Basilica; as the Chancellors were not always of the same order in the Sacred College, being either cardinal-deacons, cardinal-priests, or cardinal-bishops, this basilica could not follow the rule of the other cardinalitial titular churches that had the fixed grade of "titular" (a church over which a cardinal of the order of priests was placed) or "deaconry" (a church over which was placed a cardinal-deacon). The Basilica, on the contrary, became a titular for a Chancellor of the order of priests and a deaconry for one of the order of deacons; when the Chancellor was a suburbicarian bishop, he retained the Basilica in commendam.

== Office of regent ==
The office of regent, the next office in the order of precedence of the Cancellaria Apostolica after that of the chancellor, was instituted in 1377, when Pope Gregory XI returned from Avignon, France to his see. Cardinal Pierre de Monteruc, the chancellor at that time, refused to follow the pope from Avignon to Rome; as it was necessary that someone should direct the office of the Cancellaria, the pope, leaving the title of vice chancellor to Montéruc, appointed the Archbishop of Bari, Bartholomew Prignani, as regent. At the death of Pope Gregory XI in 1378, Prignani was elected pope, and he appointed a successor to himself in the office of regent, which was thereafter maintained, even when the vice chancellor re-established his residence in Rome.

== Modes of issuance of papal bulls ==
There were four modes of issuing papal bulls: by way of the Roman Curia (per viam Curiae), by way of the Cancellaria (per Cancellarium), secretly (per viam secretam), and by way of the Apostolic Camera (per viam Camerae); because while some bulls were taxed, others were not, and it was necessary to determine upon what bulls the proprietors of the vacabili offices (see above) had a right to receive taxes. Thus papal bulls concerning the government of the Roman Catholic Church, being exempt from all taxation, were said to be issued by way of the Roman Curia; those of which the expedition was by way of the Cancellaria were the common bulls, which, after being reviewed by the abbreviators of the greater presidency, were signed by them and by the proprietors of the vacabili, the latter of whom received the established taxes; the bulls said to be issued secretly were those in favour of some privileged persons, e. g. the palatine prelates, auditors of the Sacra Rota, and relatives of cardinals, and were signed by the vice chancellor, also exempt from taxation; finally, the bulls of which the expedition was said to be by way of the Apostolic Camera were those that concerned it. Because the style and the rules of the Cancellaria could not be adapted to these bulls, they were issued by the Sommista, whose office Pope Alexander VI instituted and later united by Pope Alexander VIII with that of the vice chancellor.

After Pope Leo XIII suppressed all the vacabili in 1901, the aforementioned modes of expedition ceased. A little later, the apostolic constitution Sapienti Consilio of Pope Pius X of 29 June 1908 provided that all bulls be issued through the Cancellaria, by order of the Congregation of the Consistory for all matters of its competency and by order of the pope for all others, in keeping with the new organization of the Cancellaria as merely an issuing office. "Sapienti Consilio" further provided that the ancient formulae of papal bulls be modified, and a commission of cardinals consisting of the chancellor, the apostolic datary, and the secretary of the Congregation of the Consistory was charged with the preparation of new ones.

This commission having reformed the bulls for Consistorial benefices, Pius X by a motu proprio of 8 December 1910 approved the new formulae and ordered them to be used exclusively after 1 January 1911. The College of the Abbreviators of the greater presidency having been suppressed and the abbreviators of the lesser presidency having become extinct in fact, the apostolic prothonotaries in actual office were appointed to sign the bulls.

The mode of dating papal bulls was also changed. Formerly they were dated according to the year of the Incarnation, which year begins on 25 March, the Solemnity of the Annunciation, which liturgically celebrates the Conception of Jesus. This mediaeval mode of dating remained peculiar to papal bulls, and over time caused much confusion. Pius X ordered that in the future these documents had to be dated according to the secular calendar year that begins on 1 January.

== Governing Rules ==
The rules of the Cancellaria were instituted in various Apostolic constitutions that the popes customarily promulgated at the beginning of their pontificates regarding judicial causes and benefices. In many cases the pope merely confirmed the provisions of his predecessor, but in others added or suppressed provisions. The result was an ancient collection of rules in force, and this mode of governing the Cancellaria continued even after Pope Pius X reformed the Roman Curia. These rules were usually divided into 3 classes: rules of direction or expedition that regarded the expedition of papal bulls; beneficial or reservatory rules that regarded benefices and reservations; and judicial rules that regarded specific prescriptions for judicial matters, especially appeals. The rules of the Cancellaria had the force of law unless exception was made by a concordat. In ancient times, these rules lost their force on the death of the pope, and revived only upon the express confirmation of his successor, but Pope Urban VIII declared that without an express confirmation the rules of the Cancellaria were restored to validity on the day after the election of the succeeding pope. The commission of cardinals responsible for the reformation of the formulae of papal bulls was responsible also for revising the rules of the Cancellaria.

== Chancellors of Holy Roman Church (1088–1187) ==
Note: some chancellors before 1144 used the ancient title "Bibliothecarius" instead of "Cancellarius". This office should not be confused with that of the Cardinal Camerlengo of Holy Roman Church, which is a cardinalatial office with competence regarding the vacancy of the Apostolic See.

- Giovanni de' Caetani (Pope Gelasius II) (1088–1118)
- Crisogono Malcondini (1118–1122)
- Aymeric de Borgogne (1123–1141)
- Gerardo Caccianemici (Pope Lucius II) (1141–1144)
  - Baronio, Pro Chancellor (1144–5)
- Robert Pullen (1145–6)
- Guido da Vico (1146–1149)
  - Boso Breakspeare, Pro Chancellor (1149–1153)
- Rolando Bandinelli (Pope Alexander III) (1153–1159)
  - Ermanno, Pro Chancellor (1159–1166)
  - Gerardo, Pro Chancellor (1166–1168)
  - Graziano da Pisa, Pro Chancellor (1168–1178)
- Alberto di Morra (Pope Gregory VIII) (1178–1187)

== Vice Chancellors of the Holy Roman Church (1187–1908) ==
- Moyses (1187–1191)
- Egidio Pierleoni (1191–1194)
- Cencio Camerario (Pope Honorius III) (1194–1198)
- Rainaldo di Acerenza (1198–1200)
- Biagio di Porto Torres (1200–1203)
- Giovanni da Ferentino (1203–1205)
- Giovanni dei Conti di Segni, Chancellor (1205–1213)
- Rainaldo Magallona (1213–1214)
- Tommaso da Capua (1215–1216)
- Rainiero (1216–19)
- William of Modena (1219–1222)
- Guido (1222-6)
- Sinibaldo Fieschi (Pope Innocent IV) (1226–7)
- Martino of Sens (1227–32)
- Bartolomeo (1232–1235)
- Guglielmo (1235–1238)
- Giacomo Boncampio (1239–1244)
- Marinus de Eboli (1244–1252)
- Guglielmo di Catadego (1252–1256)
- Rainaldo Maestro (1256–1257)
- Giordano Pironti (1257–1262)
- Michele di Tolosa (1262 – c. 1271)
- Giovanni Leccacorno (1272–1273)
- Lanfranco di Bergamo (1273–1276)
- Pietro Peregrossi (1276–1288)
- Jean Le Moine (1288–1294)
- Giovanni Castrocoeli (1294–1295)
- Pietro Valeriano Duraguerra (1295–1296)
- Riccardo Petroni (1296–1300)
- Pietro Valeriano Duraguerra (again) (1300–1301)
- Papinianus della Rovere (1301 – c. 1305)
- Pierre Arnaud de Puyanne (1305–1306)
- Petrus de Podio (1306–1307)
- Arnaud Nouvel (1307–1316)
- Gauscelin de Jean (1316–1319)
- Pierre Le Tessier (1319–1325)
- Pierre Despres (1325–1361)
- Pierre de Monteruc (1361–1385)
- Francesco Moricotti Prignano (1385–1394)
  - Vacant 1394–1405
- Angelo Acciaioli (1405–1408)
- Jean de Brogny (1409–1426)
  - Vacant 1426–36
- Jean de la Rochetaillée (1436–1437)
- Francesco Condulmer (1437–1453)
  - Vacant 1453–1457
- Rodrigo Lanzol-Borja y Borja (Pope Alexander VI) (1457–1492)
- Ascanio Maria Sforza Visconti (1492–1505)
- Galeotto Franciotti della Rovere (1505–1507)
- Sisto Gara della Rovere (1507–1517)
- Giulio de' Medici (Pope Clement VII) (1517–1523)
- Pompeo Colonna (1524–1532)
- Ippolito de' Medici (1532–1535)
- Alessandro Farnese (1535–1589)
- Alessandro (Damasceni) Peretti de Montalto (1589–1623)
- Ludovico Ludovisi (1623–1632)
- Francesco Barberini (1632–1679)
  - Vacant 1679–1689
- Pietro Ottoboni (1689–1740)
- Tommaso Ruffo (1740–1753)
- Girolamo Colonna di Sciarra (1753–1756)
- Alberico Archinto (1756–1758)
- Carlo Rezzonico (1758–1763)
- Henry Benedict Stuart of York (1763–1807)
- Francesco Carafa di Traetto (1807–1818)
- Giulio Maria della Somaglia (1818–1830)
- Tommaso Arezzo (1830–1833)
- Carlo Odescalchi (1833–1834)
- Carlo Maria Pedicini (1834–1843)
- Tommaso Bernetti (1844–1852)
- Luigi Amat di San Filippo e Sorso (1852–1878)
- Antonio Saverio De Luca (1878–1883)
- Teodolfo Mertel (1884–1899)
- Lucido Parocchi (1899–1903)
- Antonio Agliardi (1903–1908)

== Chancellors of the Holy Roman Church (1908–1973) ==
- Antonio Agliardi (1908–1915)
- Ottavio Cagiano de Azevedo (1915–1927)
- Andreas Franz Frühwirth (1927–1933)
- Tommaso Pio Boggiani (1933–1942)
- Girolamo Ricci (1942—1953)
- Celso Benigno Luigi Costantini (1954–1958)
- Santiago Copello (1959–1967)
- Luigi Traglia (1968–1973)

== See also ==
- Papal diplomatics
