= Cardinals created by Urban IV =

Catholic appointments from 1261 to 1262

Pope Urban IV (1261–1264) created fourteen new cardinals in two consistories. The exact dates of these consistories are not clear. Contemporary reports suggest that they were held on 24 December 1261 ("Saturday before Christmas") and in May 1262. However, some modern authors contest the accuracy of these reports as contradicting the established custom of that time, according to which the promotions of cardinals were celebrated on Saturdays of the Ember weeks, which fell on 17 December 1261 and 3 June 1262 respectively.

== Consistory of December 1261 ==
- Guido Foucois, archbishop of Narbonne – Cardinal-bishop of Sabina, then elected Pope Clement IV (5 February 1265), † 28 November 1268
- Raoul Grosparmi, bishop of Évreux – Cardinal-bishop of Albano, † 11 August 1270
- Simone Paltineri – Cardinal-priest of SS. Silvestro e Martino, † February 1277
- Simon de Brion – Cardinal-priest of S. Cecilia, then elected Pope Martin IV (22 February 1281), † 28 March 1285
- Uberto Coconati – Cardinal-deacon of S. Eustachio, † 13 July 1276
- Giacomo Savelli – Cardinal-deacon of S. Maria in Cosmedin, then elected Pope Honorius IV (2 April 1285), † 3 April 1287
- Goffredo da Alatri – Cardinal-deacon of S. Giorgio in Velabro, † before 31 May 1287

== Consistory of May 1262 ==
- Enrico Segusio, archbishop of Embrun – Cardinal-bishop of Ostia e Velletri, † 6/7 November 1271
- Ancher Pantaleon, papal nephew – Cardinal-priest of S. Prassede, † 1 November 1286
- Guillaume de Bray – Cardinal-priest of S. Marco, † 29 April 1282
- Guy de Bourgogne, O.Cist. – Cardinal-priest of S. Lorenzo in Lucina, † 20 May 1272
- Annibale Annibaldi, O.P. – Cardinal-priest of SS. XII Apostoli, † 15 October 1272
- Giordano Pironti, Vicechancellor of the Holy Roman Church – Cardinal-deacon of SS. Cosma e Damiano, † 9 October 1269
- Matteo Rosso Orsini – Cardinal-deacon of S. Maria in Portico, † 4 September 1305

== Sources ==
- Miranda, Salvador. "Consistories for the creation of Cardinals, 13th Century (1198-1303): Urban IV (1261-1264)". The Cardinals of the Holy Roman Church. Florida International University. OCLC 53276621.
- Konrad Eubel: Hierarchia Catholica Medii Aevi, Vol. 1, Münster 1913, p. 8
- Fischer, Andreas: Kardinäle im Konklave. Die lange Sedisvakanz der Jahre 1268 bis 1271. Bibliothek des Deutschen Historischen Instituts in Rom, 118. Max Niemeyer Verlag. Tübingen 2008 ISBN 978-3-484-82118-7
