= Lorenzo Lauri =

Cardinal of the Catholic Church

His Eminence Lorenzo Lauri
- Major Penitentiary of the Apostolic Penitentiary
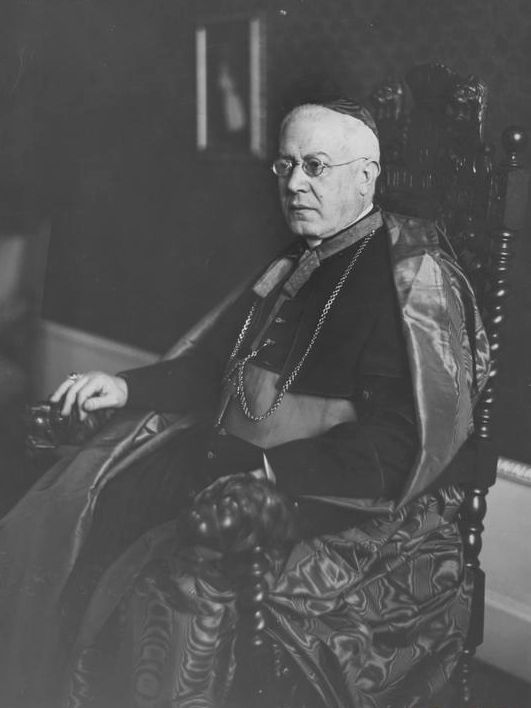
- Lauri in 1926
- Church: Roman Catholic Church
- Appointed: 31 July 1927
- Term ended: 8 October 1941
- Predecessor: Andreas Franz Früehwirth
- Successor: Nicola Canali
- Other posts: Cardinal-Priest of San Pancrazio (1927–41); Camerlengo of the Apostolic Camera (1939–41)
- Previous posts: Apostolic Internuncio to Peru (1917); Titular Archbishop of Ephesus (1917–26); Apostolic Nuncio to Peru (1917–21); Apostolic Nuncio to Poland (1921–26); Apostolic Pro-Nuncio to Poland (1926–27); Camerlengo of the College of Cardinals (1936–37)

Orders
- Ordination: 4 June 1887
- Consecration: 21 January 1917 by Donato Raffaele Sbarretti Tazza
- Created cardinal: 20 December 1926 by Pope Pius XI
- Rank: Cardinal-Priest

Personal details
- Born: Lorenzo Lauri; 15 October 1864 Rome, Papal States
- Died: 8 October 1941 (aged 76) Apostolic Palace, Vatican City
- Buried: Campo Verano
- Education: Pontifical Roman Seminary
- Coat of arms

Styles of Lorenzo Lauri
- Reference style: His Eminence
- Spoken style: Your Eminence
- Religious style: Cardinal
- Informal style: Cardinal
- See: Ephesus (titular)

Lorenzo Lauri (15 October 1864 – 8 October 1941) was an Italian Cardinal of the Catholic Church who served as Major Penitentiary from 1927 and Camerlengo from 1939 until his death and was created a cardinal in 1927.

== Biography ==
Lauri was born in Rome, and studied at the Pontifical Roman Seminary before being ordained a priest on 4 June 1887. He then taught at the Pontifical Roman Seminary and the Pontifical Urbaniana University until 1910; he had also served as an official of the Vicariate of Rome since 1895 and had been made a canon of the chapter of San Lorenzo in Damaso basilica in 1901. After being named Substitute of the regent of the Sacred Apostolic Penitentiary on 5 February 1910, Lauri was raised to the rank of Domestic Prelate of His Holiness on 5 April of that same year.

On 5 January 1917, Lauri was appointed Internuncio to Peru and Titular Archbishop of Ephesus by Pope Benedict XV. He received his episcopal consecration on 21 January from Cardinal Donato Sbarretti, with Archbishop Vincenzo Sardi di Rivisondoli and Bishop Americo Bevilacqua serving as co-consecrators.

Lauri became a full nuncio upon the establishment of complete diplomatic relations between the Vatican and Peru on 20 July 1917. He was later named Apostolic Nuncio to Poland on 25 May 1921, succeeding Achille Ratti. In this post, Lauri negotiated the concordat between the Vatican and the Second Polish Republic.

Pope Pius XI created Lauri Cardinal-Priest of San Pancrazio in the consistory of 20 December 1926, ending his time as Poland's nuncio. Returning to the Roman Curia, he was appointed Major Penitentiary on 31 July 1927.

Lauri was Camerlengo of the Sacred College of Cardinals from 15 June 1936 to 13 December 1937, and Protector of the Pontifical North American College from 1937 to 1941. It was to Cardinal Lauri that Pius XI made his final confession. He was one of the cardinal electors who participated in the 1939 papal conclave, which selected Pope Pius XII. The new Pope appointed Lauri to replace him as Camerlengo on 11 December of that year.

Cardinal Lauri died in Rome, at age 76 (a week before his next birthday). He is buried in the Campo Verano.

== Eucharistic Congress 1932 ==
Cardinal Lauri served as papal legate to the Eucharistic Congress of Dublin (1932). As his ship arrived in Dún Laoghaire on Monday 20 June, it was escorted into the harbour by aeroplanes flying in formation in the shape of a cross. He travelled in procession the nine miles from Dun Laoghaire to St Mary's Pro-Cathedral in Dublin in the Lord Mayor's Coach, led by the Blue Hussars, a recently created ceremonial cavalry unit. Made a Freeman of Dublin at a ceremony at Mansion House, during his week-long stay, the Legate visited a number of towns including Armagh, Drogheda, and Dundalk.

The closing ceremonies included a High Mass in Phoenix Park attended by an estimated one million people (or one-quarter of the country), who heard Irish tenor John McCormack sing César Franck's Panis angelicus, one of the more noted events of McCormack's career. At the conclusion of the Mass, there was a brief radio address by Pope Pius XI, broadcast throughout the country. This was followed by the Blessed Sacrament carried in procession from Phoenix Park, along the quays to O’Connell Bridge for a final Benediction conducted by Lauri before about half a million people gathered along the quays and streets.

Lauri wrote Edward Joseph Byrne, Archbishop of Dublin,

I shall never forget the unforgettably glorious days of this Eucharistic Congress . . . all have participated, all have co-operated to make this congress a triumph, government and civic leaders, as well as ecclesiastical authorities, priests, members of religious communities, men, women and children, have all united to make this Eucharistic Congress a plebiscite of love for the Blessed Eucharist, a plebiscite of devotion to the vicar of Christ."

Catholic Church titles
| Preceded by Eugenio Pacelli | Camerlengo; 11 December 1939 – 8 October 1941 | Succeeded by Benedetto Aloisi Masella |
| Preceded by Andreas Franz Frühwirth | Major Penitentiary of the Apostolic Penitentiary; 31 July 1927 – 8 October 1941 | Succeeded by Nicola Canali |
