= Raffaele Pierotti =

His Eminence Raffaele Pierotti O.P.
- Cardinal-Deacon of Santi Cosma e Damiano
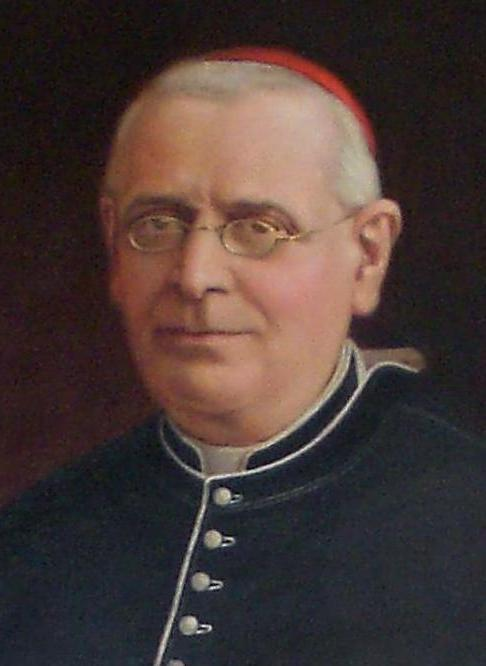
- Portrait c. 1900.
- Church: Roman Catholic Church
- Appointed: 3 December 1896
- Term ended: 7 September 1905
- Predecessor: Tommaso Maria Zigliara
- Successor: Ottavio Cagiano de Azevedo
- Previous post: Master of the Sacred Palace (1887-96)

Orders
- Ordination: 9 January 1857
- Created cardinal: 30 November 1896 by Pope Leo XIII
- Rank: Cardinal-Deacon

Personal details
- Born: Giovanni Antonio Pierotti; 1 January 1836 Sorbano del Vescovo, Lucca, Grand Duchy of Tuscany
- Died: 7 September 1905 (aged 69) Rome, Kingdom of Italy
- Buried: Campo Verano
- Parents: Giovanni Angelo Pierotti; Maria Domenica Francescani
- Education: Pontifical University of Saint Thomas Aquinas

Raffaele Pierotti O.P. (1 January 1836 – 7 September 1905) – born Giovanni Antonio – was an Italian priest of the Catholic Church who was the papal theologian from 1887 until his death. He was made a cardinal in 1896.

== Biography ==
Raffaele Pierotti was born Giovanni Antonio Pierotti in the Sorbano del Vescovo district of Lucca on 1 January 1836.

He studied at the Seminary of San Michele in Lucca and in 1853 he entered the Dominicans and attended their novitiate in Anagni, taking the name of Fra Raffaele. He took his final vows in 1857. On 9 January 1857 he was ordained a priest. He then studied at the Collegio San Tommaso d'Aquino in Rome and the Dominican College of Perugia. He taught theology in Viterbo for five years, was professor of theology and master of novices at Collegio San Tomasso d'Aquino, and then regent of studies from 1870 to 1873. From 1873 to 1877 he was pastor of Santa Maria sopra Minerva in Rome.

On 25 June 1887 Pope Leo XIII appointed him Master of the Sacred Apostolic Palace, the title then given to the now known as the Theologian of the Pontifical Household and traditionally assigned to a Dominican. He was also a member of the Pontifical Biblical Commission and of the Holy Office.

He was secretary (relator) to the commission that Pope Leo appointed in 1896 to consider the validity of ordinations in the Anglican Church. When the commission proved equally divided, the pope relied on Pierotti's analysis, resulting in the papal bull Apostolicae Curae that argued against their validity. Pierotti also believed that a reaffirmation of this negative assessment would produce large numbers of converts to Roman Catholicism. (Note: Another account of Leo's process says that Pierotti summarized the commission's work for review by the Congregation for the Doctrine of the Faith.)

Pope Leo XIII made him a cardinal with the title cardinal deacon of Santi Cosma e Damiano on 30 November 1896. He received his red biretta on 3 December.

Both before and after becoming a cardinal he was a member of the Sacred Congregation of the Index.

In 1903 he participated in the conclave that elected Pope Pius X.

He died in Rome on 7 September 1905 at the age of 69 and was buried in the Cimitero del Verano.
