= Abbreviator =

Former secretarial officers of the papacy

An abbreviator (plural "abbreviators" in English, abbreviatores in Latin) or breviator was a writer of the Papal Chancery who outlined and prepared in correct form Papal bulls, briefs, and consistorial decrees before these were written out in extenso by the scriptores.

They are first mentioned in the Papal bull Extravagantes of Pope John XXII and in a Papal bull of Pope Benedict XII.

After the protonotaries left the adumbration of the minutes to the Abbreviators, those de Parco majori of the dignity of prelate were the most important officers of the Papal Chancery. By the pontificate of Pope Martin V their signature was essential to the validity of the acts of the Chancery. Over time they obtained many important privileges.

== Roman lay origin ==
Abbreviators make an abridgment or abstract of a long writing or discourse by contracting the parts, i. e., the words and sentences; an abbreviated form of writing common among the ancient Romans. Abbreviations were of two kinds: the use of a single letter for a single word and the use of a sign, note, or mark for a word or phrase. The Emperor Justinian forbade the use of abbreviations in the compilation of the Digest and afterward extended his prohibition to all other writings. This prohibition was not universally obeyed. The Abbreviators found it convenient to use the abbreviated form, and this was especially the case in Rome. The early Christians practised the abbreviated mode, no doubt as an easy and safe way of communicating with one another and safeguarding their secrets from enemies and false brethren.

== Ecclesiastical abbreviatores ==
In course of time the Papal Chancery adopted this mode of writing as the "curial" style, still further abridging by omitting the diphthongs "ae" and "oe", and likewise all lines and marks of punctuation. The Abbreviatores were officials of the Roman Curia.

The scope of its labour, as well as the number of its officials, varied over time. Up to the twelfth or thirteenth century, the duty of the Apostolic—or Roman—Chancery was to prepare and expedite the Papal letters and writs for collation of ecclesiastical dignitaries and other matters of grave importance which were discussed and decided in Papal consistory. About the thirteenth or fourteenth century, the Popes, then residing in Avignon, France, began to reserve the collation of a great many benefices, so that all the benefices, especially the greater ones, were to be conferred through the Roman Curia (Lega, Praelectiones Jur. Can., 1, 2, 287). As a consequence, the labour was immensely augmented, and the number of Abbreviatores necessarily increased. To regulate the proper expedition of these reserved benefices, Pope John XXII instituted the rules of chancery to determine the competency and mode of procedure of the Chancery. Afterwards the establishment of the Dataria Apostolica and the Secretariate of Briefs lightened the work of the Chancery and led to a reduction in the number of Abbreviatores.

According to Ciampini (Lib. de abbreviatorum de parco majore etc., Cap. 1) the institution of curial abbreviators was very ancient, succeeding after the persecutions to the notaries who recorded the acts of the martyrs. Other authors reject this early institution and ascribe it to Pope John XXII in 1316. It is certain that he uses the name "abbreviatores", but speaks as if they had existed before his time, and had, by over-taxation of their labour, caused much complaint and protest. He (Extravag. Joan., Tit. 13, "Cum ad Sacrosanctae Romanae Ecclesiae") prescribed their work, determined how much they could charge for their labour, fixed a certain tax for an abstract or abridgment of twenty-five words or their equivalent at 150 letters, forbade them to charge more, even though the abstract was over twenty-five words but less than fifty words, enacted that the basis of the tax was the labour employed in writing, expediting, etc. the bulls, and by no means the emoluments that accrued to the recipient of the favour or benefice conferred by the bull, and declared that whoever charged more than the tax fixed by him was suspended for six months from office, and upon a second violation of the law, was deprived of it altogether, and if the delinquent was an abbreviator, he was excommunicated. Should a large letter have to be rewritten, owing to the inexact copy of the abbreviator, the abbreviator and not the receiver of the bull had to pay the extra charge for the extra labour to the Apostolic writer.

Whatever may be the date of the institution of the office of abbreviator, it is certain that it became of greater importance and more highly privileged upon its erection into a college of prelates. Pope Martin V (Constit. 3 "In Apostolicae", 2 and 5) fixed the manner for their examination and approbation and also the tax they could demand for their labour and the punishment for overcharge. He also assigned to them certain remunerations. The Abbreviators of the lower, or lesser, were to be promoted to the higher, or greater, bar or presidency. Their offices were compatible with other offices, i. e. they could hold two benefices or offices simultaneously, some conferred by the Cardinal Vice Chancellor, others by the Pope.

== Institution of the College of Abbreviators ==
In the pontificate of Pope Pius II, their number, which had been fixed at twenty-four, had overgrown to such an extent as to diminish considerably the individual remuneration, and, as a consequence, competent men no longer sought the office, and hence the old style of writing and expediting the bulls was no longer used, to the great injury of justice, the interested parties, and the dignity of the Apostolic See. To remedy this and to restore the old established chancery style, the Pope selected out of the many then living Abbreviators seventy, and formed them into a college of prelates denominated the "College of Abbreviators", and decreed that their office should be perpetual, that certain remunerations should be attached to it, and granted certain privileges to the possessors of the same. He ordained further that some should be called "Abbreviators of the Upper Bar" (Abbreviatores de Parco Majori; the name derived from a place in the Chancery that was surrounded by a grating, in which the officials sat, which is called higher or lower (major or minor) according to the proximity of the seats to that of the Vice Chancellor), the others of the Lower Bar (Abbreviatores de Parco Minori); that the former should sit upon a slightly raised portion of the chamber, separated from the rest of the chamber by lattice work, assist the Cardinal Vice-Chancellor, subscribe the letters and have the principal part in examining, revising, and expediting the Apostolic letters to be issued with the leaden seal; that the latter, however, should sit among the Apostolic writers upon benches in the lower part of the chamber, and their duty was to carry the signed schedules or supplications to the prelates of the Upper Bar. Then one of the prelates of the Upper Bar made an abstract, and another prelate of the same bar revised it. Prelates of the Upper Bar formed a quasi-tribunal, in which as a college they decided all doubts that might arise about the form and quality of the letters, of the clauses and decrees to be adjoined to the Apostolic letters, and sometimes about the payment of the remunerations and other contingencies. Their opinion about questions concerning Chancery business was held in the highest estimation by all the Roman tribunals.

Pope Paul II suppressed the college, but Pope Sixtus IV (Constitutio 16, "Divina") re-instituted it. He appointed seventy-two abbreviators, of whom twelve were of the upper, or greater, and twenty-two of the lower, or lesser, presidency ("parco"), and thirty-eight examiners on first appearance of letters. They were bound to be in attendance on certain days under penalty of fine, and sign letters and diplomas. Ciampini mentions a decree of the Vice Chancellor by which absentees were mulcted in the loss of their share of the remuneration of the following session of the Chancery. The same Pope also granted many privileges to the College of Abbreviators, but especially to the members of the greater presidency.

Pope Pius VII suppressed many of the offices of the Chancery, and so the Tribunal of Correctors and the Abbreviators of the lower presidency disappeared. Of the Tribunal of Correctors, a substitute-corrector alone remains. Bouix (Curia Romana, edit. 1859) chronicled the suppression of the lower presidency and put the number of Abbreviators at that date at eleven. Later the college consisted of seventeen prelates, six substitutes, and one sub-substitute, all of whom, except the prelates, were clerics or laity. Although the duty of Abbreviators was originally to make abstracts and abridgments of the Apostolic letters, diplomas, et cetera, using the legal abbreviations, clauses, and formularies, in course of time, as their office grew in importance they delegated that part of their office to their substitute and confined themselves to overseeing the proper expedition of the Apostolic letters. Prior to 1878, all Apostolic letters and briefs requiring for their validity the leaden seal were engrossed upon rough parchment in Gothic characters or round letters, also called "Gallicum" and commonly "Bollatico", but in Italy "Teutonic", without lines, diphthongs, or marks of punctuation. Bulls engrossed on a different parchment, or in different characters with lines and punctuation marks, or without the accustomed abbreviations, clauses, and formularies, were rejected as spurious. Pope Leo XIII in his Constitutio Universae Eccles. of 29 December 1878 ordained that they should be written henceforth in ordinary Latin characters upon ordinary parchment and that no abbreviations were to be used except those easily understood.

== Titles and privileges ==
Many great privileges were conferred upon Abbreviators. By decree of Pope Leo X they were elevated as Papal nobles, ranking as Comes palatinus ("Count Palatine"), familiars and members of the Papal household, so that they might enjoy all the privileges of domestic prelates and of prelates in actual attendance on the Pope, as regards plurality of benefices as well as expectatives. They and their clerics and their properties were exempt from all jurisdiction except the immediate jurisdiction of the Pope, and they were not subject to the judgments of the Auditor of Causes or the Cardinal Vicar. He also empowered them to confer, later within strict limitations, the degree of Doctor, with all university privileges, institute notaries (later abrogated), legitimize children so as to make them eligible to receive benefices vacated by their fathers (later revoked), also to ennoble three persons and to make Knights of the Order of St. Sylvester (Militiae Aureae), the same to enjoy and to wear the insignia of nobility. Pope Gregory XVI rescinded this privilege and reserved to the Pope the right of institution of such knights (Acta Pont. Greg. XVI, Vol. 3, 178–179–180).

Pope Paul V, who in early manhood was a member of the college (Const. 2, "Romani"), made them Referendaries of Favours, and after three years of service, Referendaries of Justice, enjoying the privileges of Referendaries and permitting one to assist in the signatures before the Pope, giving all a right to a portion in the Papal palace and exempting them from the registration of favours as required by Pope Pius IV (Const., 98) with regard to matters pertaining to the Apostolic Chamber.

They followed immediately after the twelve voting members of the Signature in capella. Abbreviators of the greater presidency were permitted to wear the purple cassock and cappa, as also rochet in capella. Abbreviators of the lower presidency before their suppression were simple clerics, and according to permission granted by Pope Sixtus IV (loc. cit.) might be even married.

These offices becoming vacant by death of the Abbreviator, no matter where the death occurred, were reserved to the Roman Curia. The prelates could resign their office in favour of others. Formerly these offices as well as those of the other Chancery officers from the Regent down were occasions of venality, until Popes, especially Pope Benedict XIV and Pope Pius VII, gradually abolished that. Pope Leo XIII in a motu proprio of 4 July 1898 most solemnly decreed the abolition of all venality in the transfer or collation of the said offices.

As domestic prelates, prelates of the Roman Curia, they had personal preeminence in every diocese of the world. They were addressed as "Reverendissimus", "Right Reverend", and "Monsignor". As prelates, and therefore possessing the legal dignity, they were competent to receive and execute Papal commands. Pope Benedict XIV (Const. 3, "Maximo") granted prelates of the greater presidency the privilege of wearing a hat with a purple band, which right they held even after they ceased to be abbreviators.

== Suppression ==
Pope Pius X abrogated the college in 1908 and their obligations were transferred to the protonotarii apostolici participantes.
