= Luigi Traglia =

Italian cardinal (1895–1977)

His Eminence Luigi Traglia
- Dean of the College of Cardinals
- Church: Roman Catholic Church
- Appointed: 7 January 1974
- Term ended: 22 November 1977
- Predecessor: Amleto Giovanni Cicognani
- Successor: Carlo Confalonieri
- Other posts: Cardinal-Bishop of Albano (1972–77); Cardinal-Bishop of Ostia (1974–77)
- Previous posts: Titular Archbishop of Cesarea in Palaestina (1936–60); Vicegerent for the Vicariate of Rome (1936–60); Pro-Vicar General of Rome (1960–65); Cardinal-Priest of Sant'Andrea della Valle (1960–69); President of the Pontifical Commission for Sacred Archaeology (1965–67); Vicar General of Rome (1965–68); Grand Chancellor of the Pontifical Lateran University (1965–68); Apostolic Administrator of Ostia (1966–68); Chancellor of the Apostolic Chancery (1968–73); Cardinal-Priest of San Lorenzo in Damaso (1969–72); Vice-Dean of the College of Cardinals (1972–74)

Orders
- Ordination: 10 August 1917 by Basilio Pompili
- Consecration: 6 January 1937 by Francesco Marchetti Selvaggiani
- Created cardinal: 28 March 1960 by Pope John XXIII
- Rank: Cardinal-Priest (1960–72); Cardinal-Bishop (1972–77)

Personal details
- Born: Luigi Traglia; 3 April 1895 Albano Laziale, Kingdom of Italy
- Died: 22 November 1977 (aged 82) Rome, Italy
- Buried: Campo Verano (1977–82); San Lorenzo in Damaso
- Education: Almo Collegio Capranica; Pontifical Lateran University; Pontifical Gregorian University
- Motto: Primum regnum Dei

- Coat of arms

Styles of Luigi Traglia
- Reference style: His Eminence
- Spoken style: Your Eminence
- Informal style: Cardinal
- See: Albano (suburbicarian), Ostia (suburbicarian)

Luigi Traglia (3 April 1895 – 22 November 1977) was an Italian Catholic prelate who served as Vicar General of Rome from 1965 to 1968, and Dean of the College of Cardinals from 1974 until his death. Traglia was elevated to the cardinalate in 1960.

== Life and career in Church ==
Traglia was born in Albano Laziale, and studied at the Pontifical Lateran University and Pontifical Gregorian University in Rome. He was ordained to the priesthood by Cardinal Basilio Pompili on 10 August 1917, and then finished his studies in 1919. While teaching at the Pontifical Urbaniana University from 1919 to 1936, Traglia was also an official of the Sacred Congregations of Seminaries and Universities and of the Propagation of the Faith from 1927 to 1930. On 18 August 1930, he became assessor and subpromoter-general of the faith in the latter congregation. He was raised to the rank of Domestic Prelate of His Holiness on 22 February 1932, and later Auditor of the Roman Rota on 17 September 1936.

On 21 December 1936, Traglia was appointed Vicar General of The Diocese of Rome and Titular Archbishop of Caesarea in Palaestina. He received his episcopal consecration on 6 January 1937, from Cardinal Francesco Marchetti-Selvaggiani, with Archbishop Domenico Spolverini and Bishop Angelo Calabretta serving as co-consecrators, in the Lateran Basilica. Traglia was later named President of the Special Committee for the Marian Holy Year on 7 October 1953, and of the commission for the first Roman synod in 1959.

He was made Cardinal-Priest of S. Andrea della Valle by Pope John XXIII in the consistory of 28 March 1960. Pope Paul VI changed Traglia's titular church to that of San Lorenzo in Damaso on 28 April 1969. On 15 March 1972, he was elevated to Cardinal Bishop of Albano.

From 1962 to 1965, Traglia participated in the Second Vatican Council, during the course of which he served as a cardinal elector in the 1963 papal conclave that selected Pope Paul VI. He was named Vicar General of Rome on 30 March 1965. In this position, he governed the diocese in the name of the Pope, who is the Bishop of Rome. After resigning as Cardinal Vicar on 9 January 1968, Traglia was appointed Apostolic Chancellor on the following 13 January. He resigned that post on 7 February 1973, not long before the office was abolished on 27 February of that same year. Traglia was elected and confirmed as Vice-Dean of the College of Cardinals on 24 March 1972, later becoming Dean of the College of Cardinals and Cardinal Bishop of Ostia, while retaining his previous suburbicarian title, on 7 January 1974. On 24 December of that year, he served as papal legate to the opening of the Holy Door at the Basilica of Saint Paul Outside the Walls.

Traglia died in Rome in 1977.

Catholic Church titles
Preceded by Clemente Micara	Vicar General of Rome; 30 March 1965 – 9 January 1968	Succeeded by Angelo Dell'Acqua
Preceded by Santiago Copello	Chancellor of the Holy Roman Church; 13 January 1968 – 7 February 1973	Succeeded by None, office abolished
Preceded by Amleto Giovanni Cicognani	Dean of the College of Cardinals; 7 January 1974 – 22 November 1977	Succeeded by Carlo Confalonieri
