= Santi Cosma e Damiano, Rome =

Roman Catholic basilica, a landmark of Rome, Italy

Santi Cosma e Damiano
- Basilica of Saints Cosmas and Damian
- Basilica dei Santi Cosma e Damiano
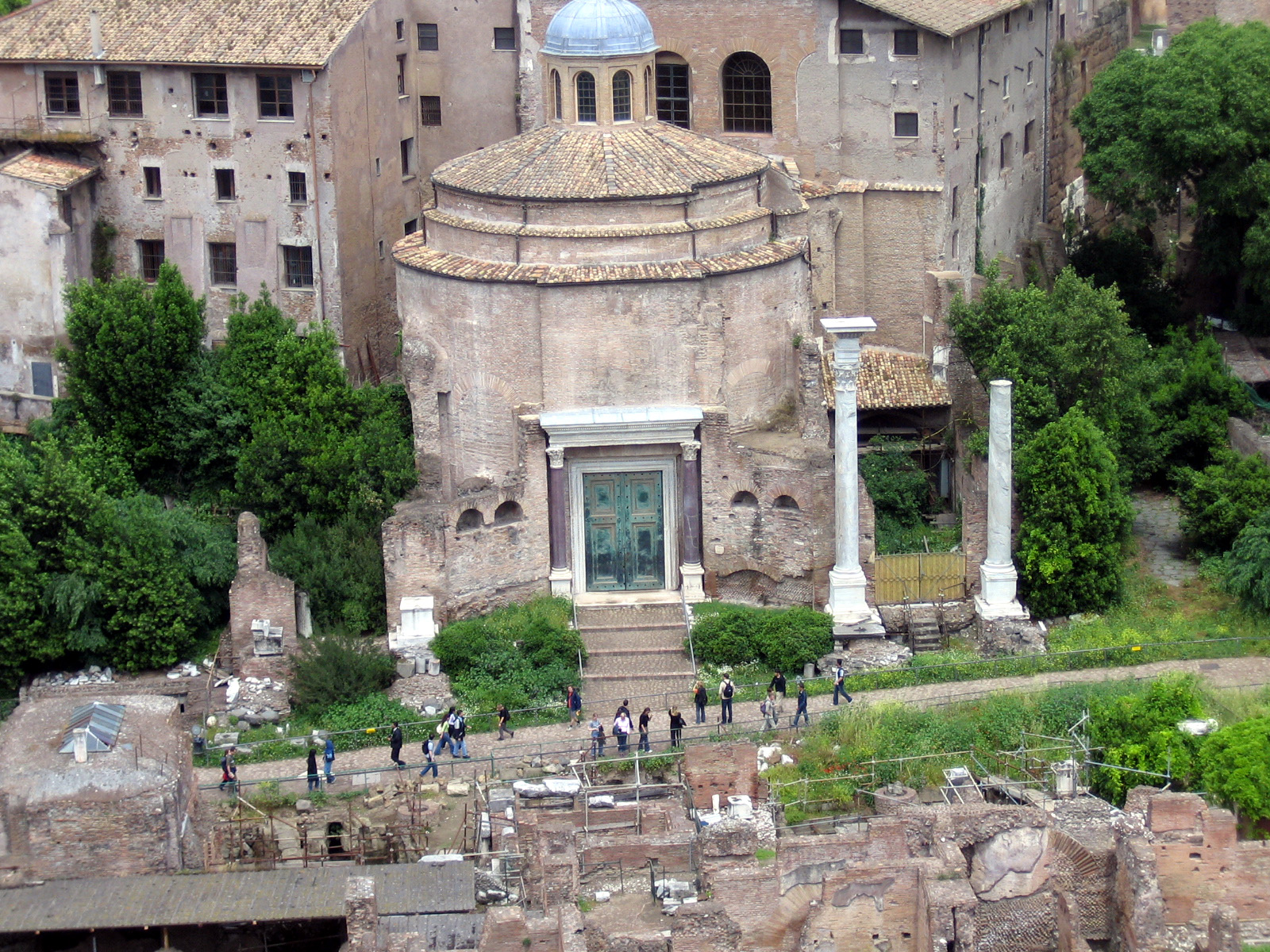
- View of the Temple of Romulus, from the Palatine Hill.
- Click on the map for a fullscreen view
- 41°53′31″N 12°29′15″E
- Country: Italy
- Language: Italian
- Denomination: Catholic
- Previous denomination: Originally dedicated to the deified Valerius Romulus
- Tradition: Latin Church
- Religious order: T.O.R. Franciscans
- Website: cosmadamiano.com

History
- Status: Minor basilica, Titular church, General Curia of the Franciscan Third Order Regular
- Founded: AD 527 (as a church)
- Founder: Pope Felix IV
- Dedication: Cosmas and Damian

Architecture
- Functional status: Active
- Style: Early Christian
- Groundbreaking: AD 309
- Completed: 1632

Administration
- Diocese: Rome

The basilica of Santi Cosma e Damiano is a titular church in Rome, Italy. It is the conventual church of the General Curia of the Franciscan Third Order Regular. The lower portion of the building is accessible through the Roman Forum and incorporates original Roman buildings, but the entrance to the upper level is outside the Forum facing the Via dei Fori Imperiali.

The circular building located at the entrance of the Forum, which now houses a small archeological exhibition, was possibly built in the early 4th century AD as a Roman temple which may have been dedicated to Valerius Romulus, deified son of the emperor Maxentius; it is often referred to as the Temple of Romulus. The main building was perhaps the library of an imperial forum. It became a church in 527 and contains important but much restored early Christian art, especially in its mosaics.

Today it is one of the ancient churches called tituli, of which cardinals are patrons as cardinal-deacons. Since 28 November 2020 the title has been held by Cardinal Mario Grech. The basilica, devoted to the two Arabian Christian brothers, doctors, martyrs and saints Cosmas and Damian, is located in the Forum of Vespasian, also known as the Forum of Peace.

== History ==
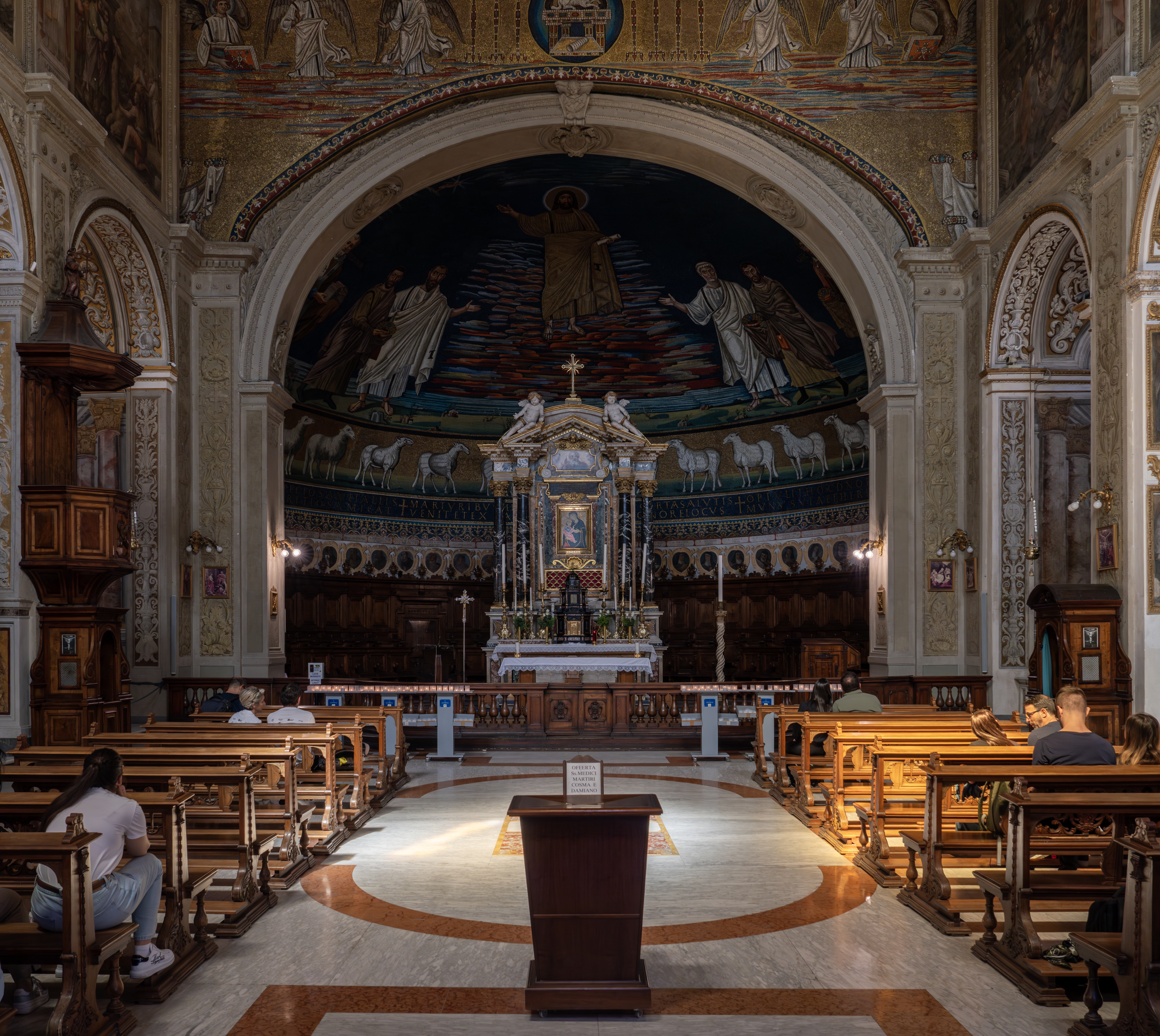
Nave of the basilica

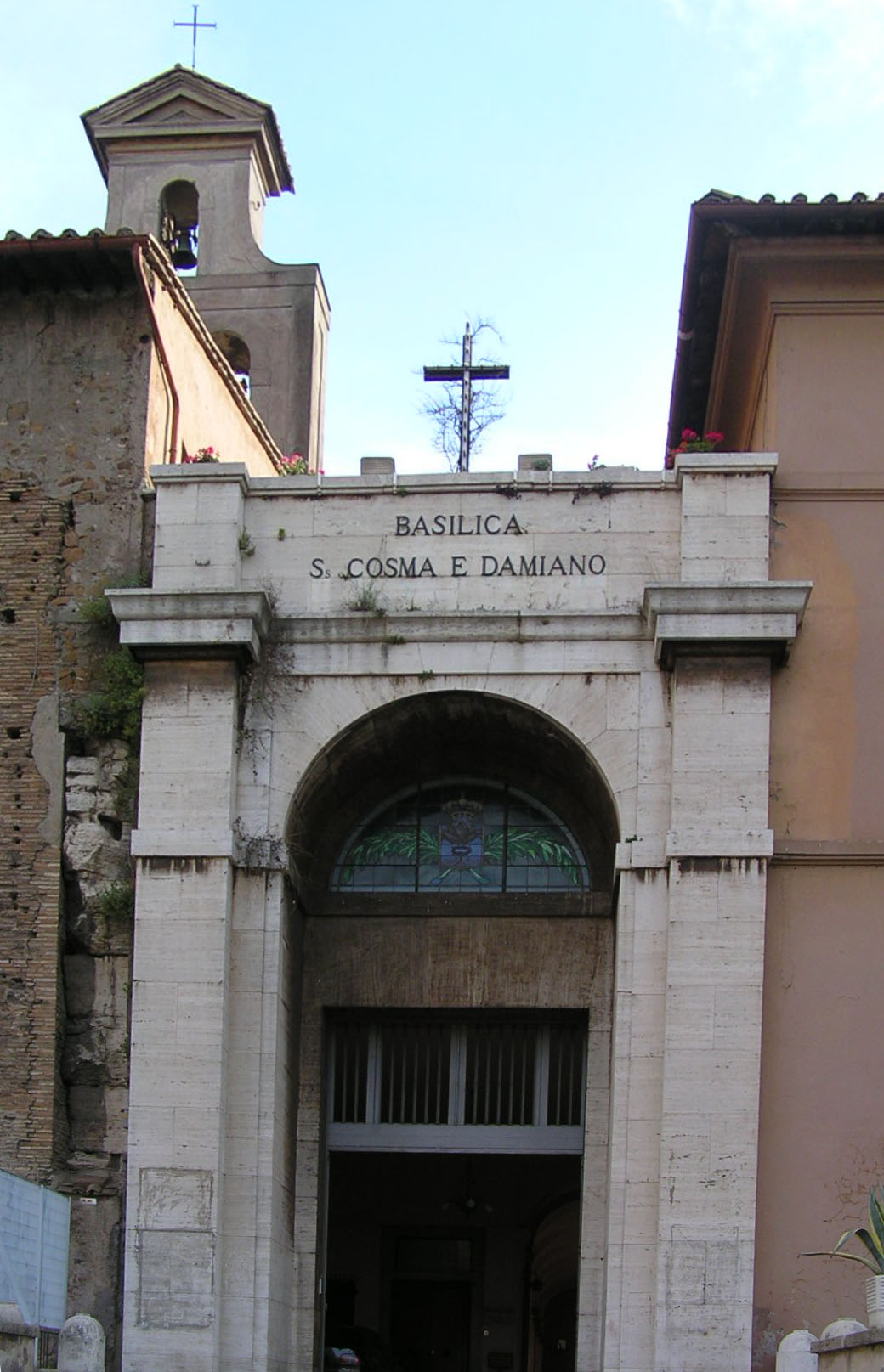
Modern street view of the Church

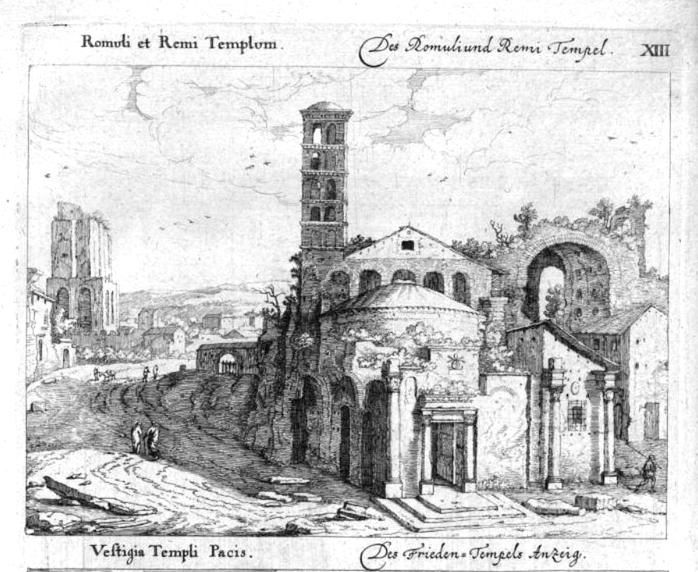
Engraving of the Church Giovanni Battista Falda (1665)

The Temple is traditionally held to have been dedicated by Emperor Maxentius to his son and co-consul Valerius Romulus, who died in 309 AD and was given divine honors. The temple building was probably part of a rebuilding program of "incredible intensity" undertaken by Maxentius in the area, following a disastrous fire in 306 AD; the project was only part-complete at his death. The temple's identification with Valerius Romulus is tentative, based on the spot-find of a coin dated to 307 AD showing the distinctive shape of the building, and a nearby dedication to Valerius Romulus as a divinised mortal. The temple has also been speculated as a rebuilding of the original temple of "Jupiter Stator", or one dedicated to Penates, restored by Maxentius.

The temple was Christianised and dedicated to Sancti Cosma et Damianus in 527 AD, when Theodoric the Great, king of the Ostrogoths, and his daughter Amalasuntha donated the library of the Forum of Peace (Bibliotheca Pacis) and a portion of the Temple of Romulus to Pope Felix IV. The pope united the two buildings to create a basilica devoted to two Arabian Christian brothers and saints, Cosmas and Damian, in contrast with the ancient pagan cult of the two brothers Castor and Pollux, who had been worshipped in the nearby Temple of Castor and Pollux. The apse was decorated with a Roman-Byzantine mosaic, representing a parousia, the Second Coming of Christ at the end of time. The bodies of Saints Mark and Marcellian were translated, perhaps in the ninth century, to this church, where they were rediscovered in 1583 during the reign of Pope Gregory XIII.

In 1632, Pope Urban VIII ordered the restoration of the basilica. The works, projected by Orazio Torriani and directed by Luigi Arrigucci, raised the floor level seven metres, bringing it equal with the Campo Vaccino, thus avoiding the infiltration of water. Also, a cloister was added. The old floor of the basilica is still visible in the lower church, which is the lower part of the first church.

In 1947, the restorations of the Imperial Forums gave a new structure to the church. The old entrance, through the Temple of Romulus, was closed, and the temple was restored to its original forms; with the Pantheon, the Temple of Romulus is the best preserved pagan temple in Rome. A new entrance was opened on the opposite side (on via dei Fori Imperiali), whose arch gives access to the cloister, and through this to the side of the basilica.

== Structure and art ==
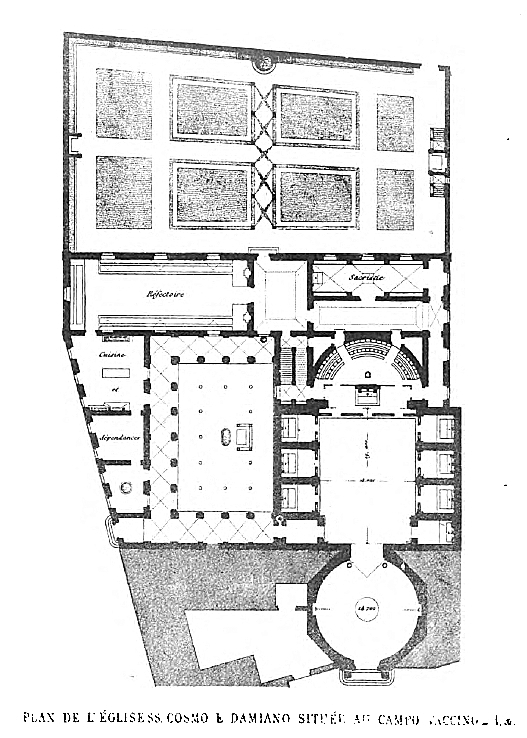
Plan of the Basilica and Monastery

Next to the new entrance to the complex, there are the rooms with the original marble paving of the Forum of Peace, and the wall where the 150 marble slabs of the Forma Urbis Romae were hung. Through the cloister, the entrance to the church opens on the side of the single nave. The plan of the basilica followed the norms of the Counter-Reformation: a single nave, with three chapels per side, and the big apse, which now looks quite oversized because of the reduction in height of the 17th-century restoration, framed by the triumphal arch, also mutilated by that restoration.

The mosaics are masterpieces of 6th- and 7th-century art. In the middle is Christ, with Saint Peter presenting Saint Cosmas and Saint Theodorus (right), and Saint Paul presenting Saint Damian and Pope Felix IV; the latter holds a model of the church.

== History of medicine ==
The importance of this basilica for the history of medicine is not only related to the fact that the two brothers were physicians and were honoured as patron saints of physicians, surgeons, pharmacists and veterinarians, with veneration dating from the mid 5th century CE, but also to the tradition according to which Claudius Galen himself lectured in the Library of the Temple of Peace ("Bibliotheca Pacis"). Furthermore, for centuries, in this "medical area" Roman physicians had their meetings.

== Gallery ==
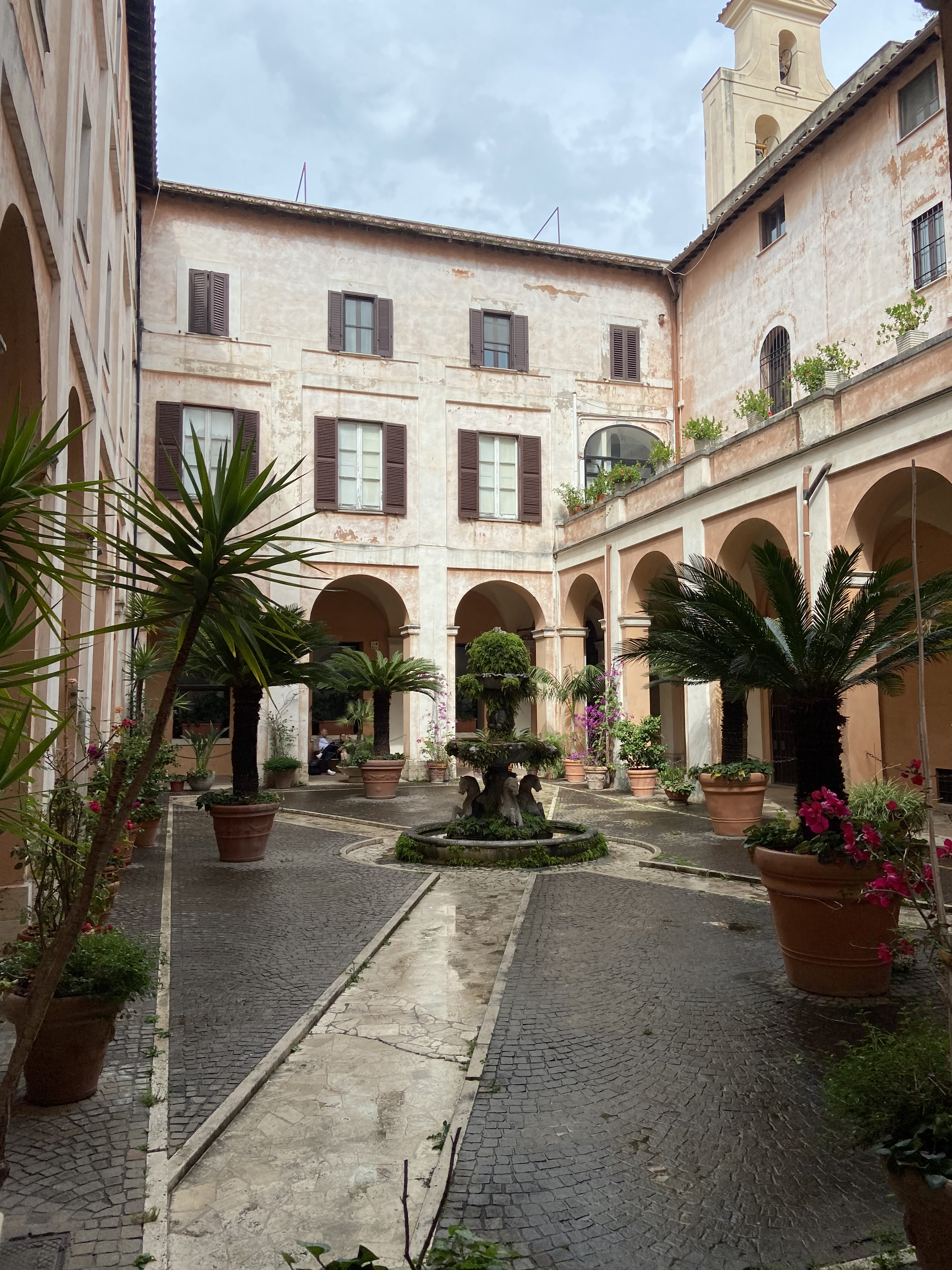
Cloister at St Cosmas and Damian, Rome

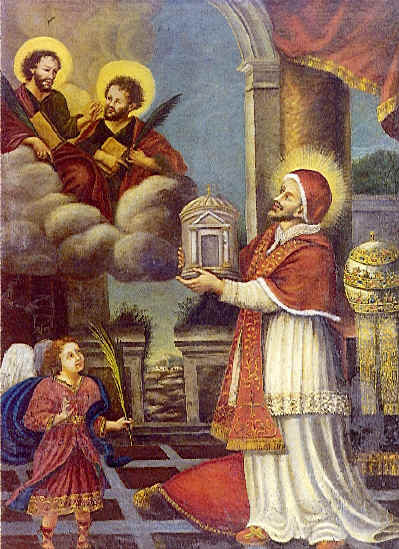
Pope Felix IV presents Saints Cosmas and Damian with the basilica he rededicated

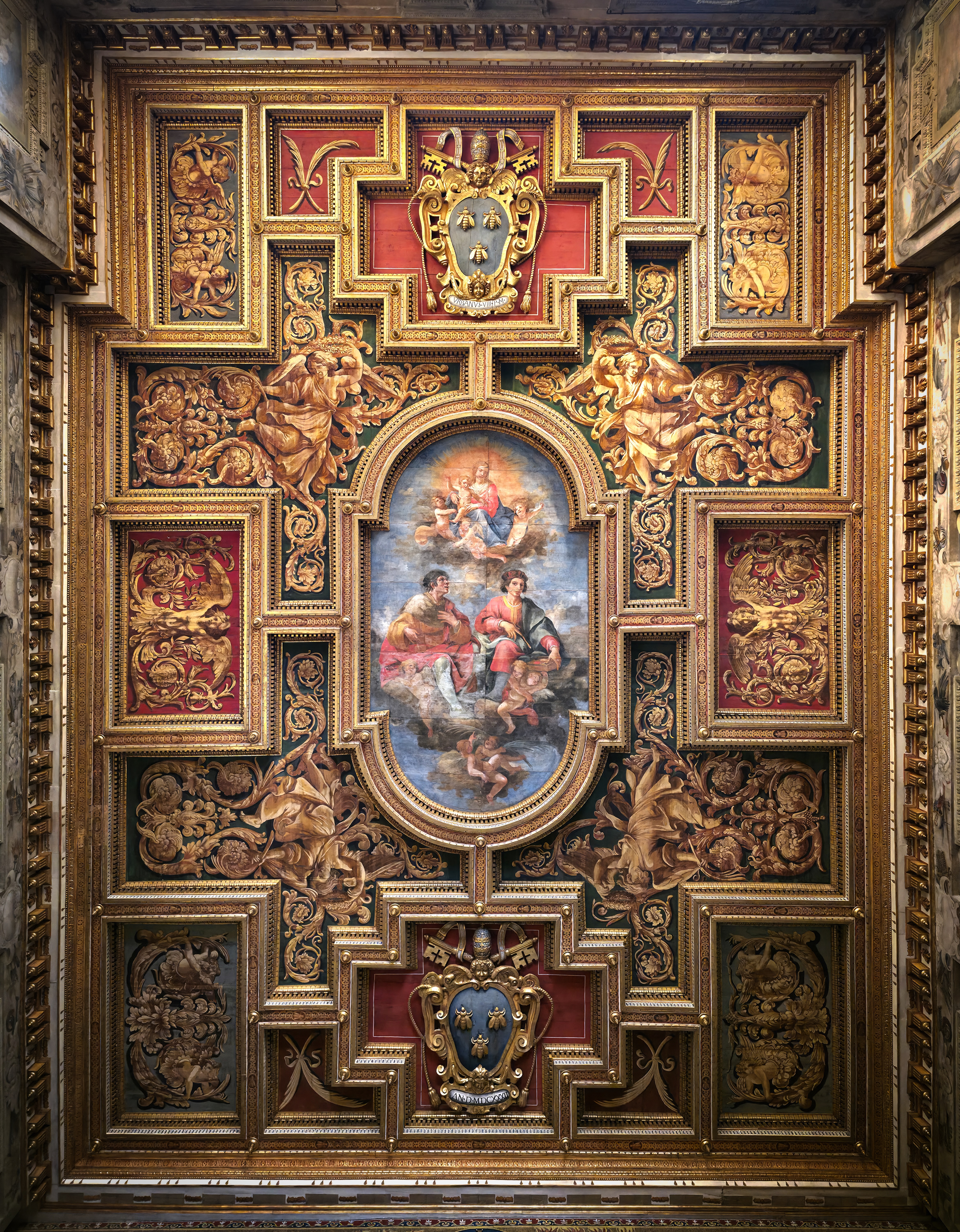
Nave Ceiling

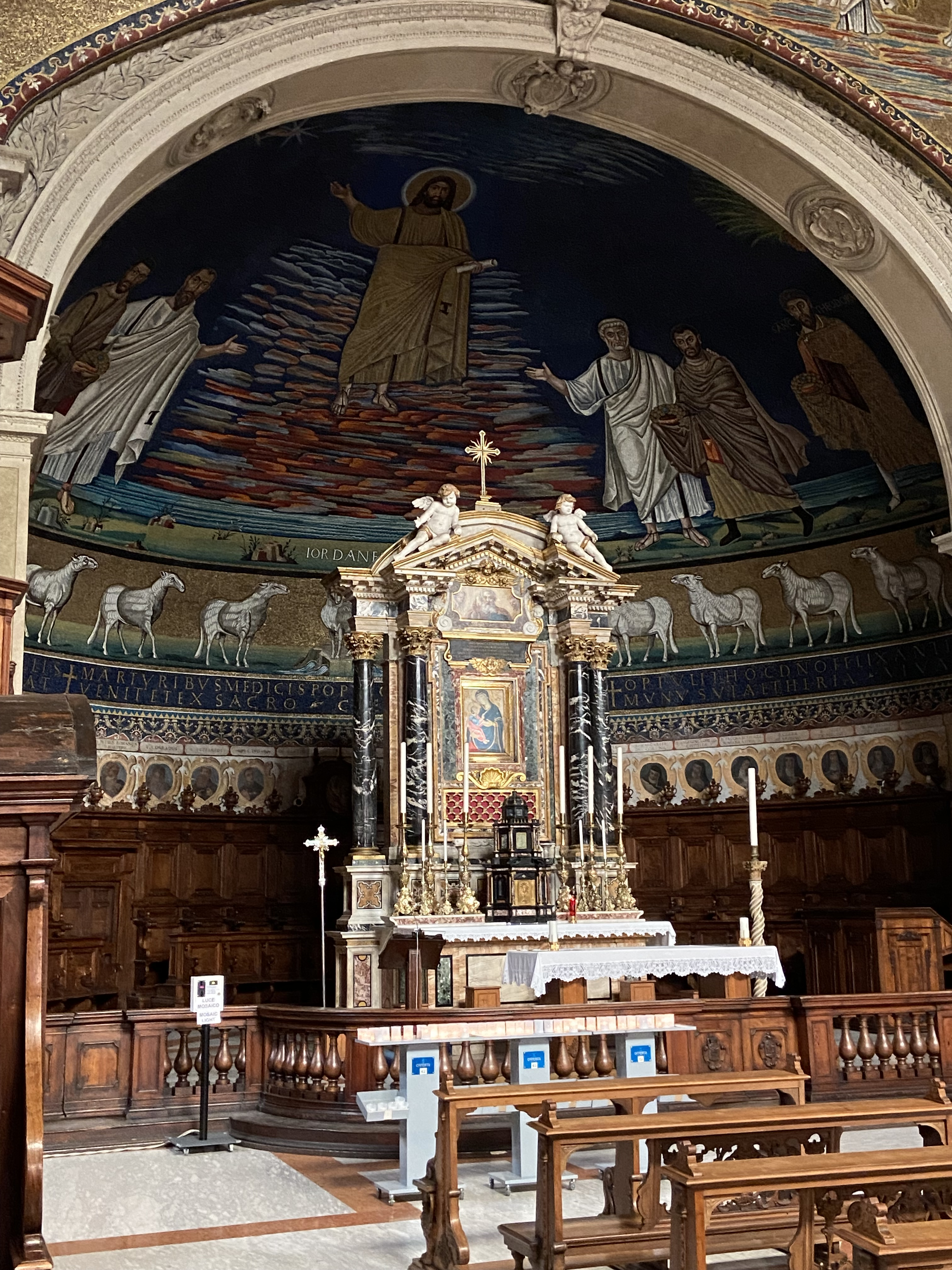
Apse and Reredos at St Cosmas and Damian, Rome

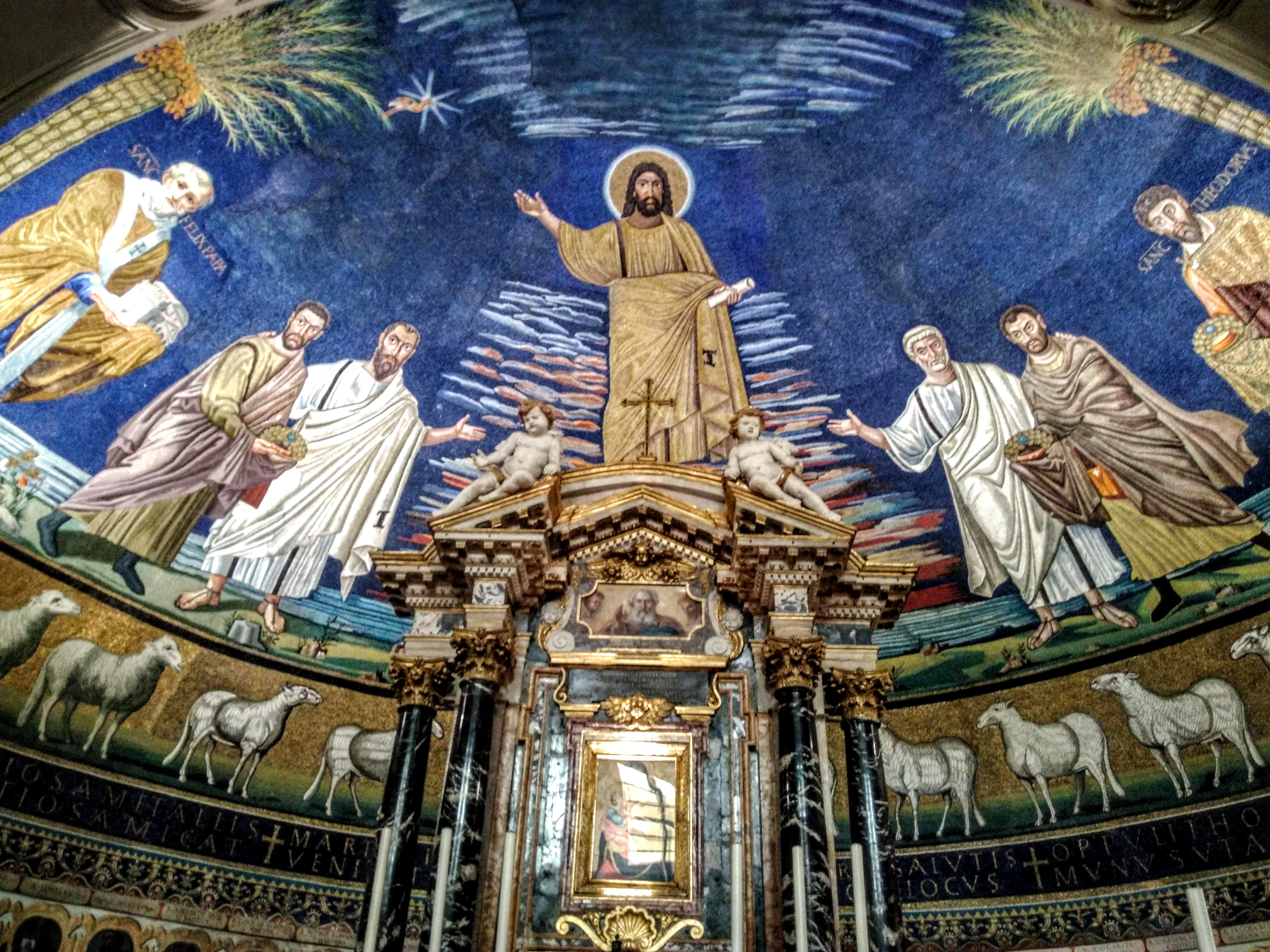
Apse mosaic

== Cardinal-deacons ==
- Pietro Pierleoni (1106–1120)
- Gionata (1120–1130)
- Guido da Vico (1130–1150)
- Rolando Bandinelli, C.R.L. (1152–1155)
- Boso (1155–1165)
- Graziano da Pisa (1178–1205)
- Giovanni Colonna (1205–1216)
- Gil Torres (1216–1254)
- Giordano Pironti (1262–1269)
- Benedetto Caetani (1295–1297)
- Guillaume Ruffat des Forges (1305–1306)
- Luca Fieschi (1306–1336)
- Leonardo Cibo (1402–1404)
- Jean Gilles (1405–1408)
- Pietro Stefaneschi (1409–1410)
- Francesco Zabarella (1411–1417)
- Ardicino della Porta, seniore (1426–1434)
- Pierre de Foix, il giovane (1477–1485)
- Alessandro Farnese (1493–1503; later Pope Paul III)
- Innocenzo Cybo (1513–1517)
- Giovanni Salviati (1517–1543)
- Giacomo Savelli (1543–1552)
- Girolamo Simoncelli (1554–1588)
- Federico Borromeo (1589)
- Guido Pepoli (1590–1592)
- Flaminio Piatti (1592–1593)
- Agostino Spinola Basadone (1623–1631)
- Alessandro Cesarini (iuniore) (1632–1637)
- Benedetto Odescalchi (1645–1659)
- Odoardo Vecchiarelli (1660–1667)
- Leopoldo de' Medici (1668–1670)
- Nicolò Acciaioli (1670–1689)
- Fulvio Astalli (1689–1710)
- Bartolomeo Ruspoli (1730–1741)
- Mario Bolognetti (1743–1747)
- Carlo Vittorio Amedeo delle Lanze (1747)
- Ludovico Maria Torriggiani (1753–1754)
- Girolamo Colonna di Sciarra (1756–1760)
- Cornelio Caprara (1762–1765)
- Benedetto Veterani (1766–1776)
- Antonio Maria Doria Pamphilj (1785–1789)
- Ludovico Flangini Giovanelli (1789–1794)
- Giovanni Caccia-Piatti (1816–1833)
- Pietro de Silvestri (1858–1861)
- Tommaso Maria Zigliara (1879–1891)
- Raffaele Pierotti (1896–1905)
- Ottavio Cagiano de Azevedo (1905–1915)
- Andreas Frühwirth (1916–1927)
- Vincenzo Lapuma (1935–1943)
- Crisanto Luque Sánchez (1953–1959)
- Francesco Morano (1959–1968)
- Johannes Willebrands (1969–1975)
- Eduardo Francisco Pironio (1976–1987) later Cardinal-Priest (1987–1995)
- Giovanni Cheli (1998–2008) later Cardinal-Priest (2008–2013)
- Beniamino Stella (2014–2020)
- Mario Grech (2020–present)

== See also ==
- List of Ancient Roman temples
- Roman architecture

== Books and articles ==
- Pietro Chioccioni, La Basilica E Il Convento Dei Santi Cosma E Damiano in Roma (Roma: Curia Generalizia dell'Ordine, 1963).
- Roberta Budriesi, La Basilica dei Ss. Cosma e Damiano a Roma (Bologna: Patron 1968).
- Vitaliano Tiberia, Il Restauro Del Mosaico Della Basilica Dei Santi Cosma E Damiano a Roma (Todi, Perugia: Ediart, 1991) [Arte e restauro, 7].
- Roma, Touring Club Italiano, 2004, pp. 276–277.
- Tucci, Pier Luigi, "Nuove acquisizioni sulla basilica dei Santi Cosma e Damiano", Studi Romani 49 (2001) 275–293
- Tucci, Pier Luigi, "The Revival of Antiquity in Medieval Rome: the Restoration of the Basilica of SS. Cosma e Damiano in the Twelfth Century", Memoirs of the American Academy in Rome 49 (2004) 99–126.
- Jacalyn Duffin, Medical Saints: Cosmas and Damian in a Postmodern World (NY-Oxford: Oxford University Press 2013).

Preceded by San Clemente	Landmarks of Rome; Santi Cosma e Damiano	Succeeded by San Crisogono
