= Andreas Frühwirth =

Austrian friar of the Dominican Order

His Eminence Andreas Frühwirth O.P.
- Chancellor of the Apostolic Chancery
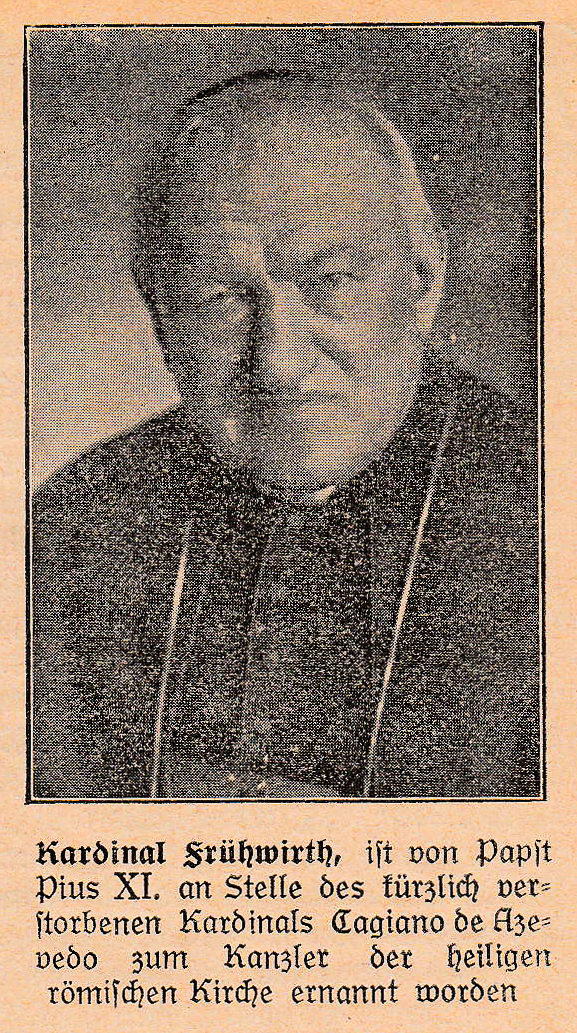
- Cardinal Andreas Frühwirth 1927
- Appointed: 19 December 1927
- Predecessor: Ottavio Cagiano de Azevedo
- Successor: Tommaso Pio Boggiani, O.P.
- Other post: Cardinal-Priest of S. Lorenzo in Damaso
- Previous posts: Major Penitentiary of the Apostolic Penitentiary (1925–1927); Apostolic Nuncio to Germany (1907–1916); Cardinal-Priest of Ss. Cosma e Damiano (1915–1927); Titular Archbishop of Heraclea in Europa (1907–1915)

Orders
- Ordination: 5 July 1868
- Consecration: 30 November 1907 by Cardinal Rafael Merry del Val y Zulueta
- Created cardinal: 6 December 1915
- Rank: Cardinal Priest

Personal details
- Born: Franz Frühwirth; 21 August 1845 Sankt Anna am Aigen, Styria, Austria
- Died: 9 February 1933 (aged 87) Rome, Italy
- Denomination: Roman Catholic

Styles of Andreas Franz Frühwirth
- Reference style: His Eminence
- Spoken style: Your Eminence
- Informal style: Cardinal
- See: Eraclea (titular see)

Andreas Frühwirth (21 August 1845 – 9 February 1933) was an Austrian friar of the Dominican Order. He was promoted to the rank of cardinal of the Catholic Church and served as the Major Penitentiary of Apostolic Penitentiary.

== Life ==
He was born Franz Frühwirth in the village of St. Anna am Aigen, located in the Province of Styria, Austria. His last name is also listed as Frühwirt.

== Education ==
Frühwirth joined the Dominican Order on 13 September 1863 in Graz and received the religious name of Andreas. He was professed on 14 September 1864. He studied at the Dominican houses of studies where he studied philosophy and theology. Later he studied at the College of St Thomas in Rome, the future Pontifical University of Saint Thomas Aquinas, Angelicum in Rome from 1869 to 1870. He completed the exam for Lectorate at the College in 1870.

== Priesthood ==
Frühwirth was ordained to the priesthood on 5 July 1868 in Graz. He then taught theology for six years in the Dominican College of Graz and was its prior from 1872 to 1875, and then prior of the house in Vienna from 1876 to 1880. He was elected Master General of the Order at the General Chapter in Lyon on 19 September 1891 and served in that post until 21 May 1904.

Frühwirth then served as a consultor of the Supreme Sacred Congregation of the Holy Office from 19 December 1906. He was named papal nuncio to the Kingdom of Bavaria by Pope Pius X on 26 October 1907.

== Episcopate ==
Frühwirth was appointed titular archbishop of Heraclea in Europa by Pope Pius on 5 November 1907. He was consecrated on 30 November at the German national church of Santa Maria dell'Anima in Rome, by Rafael Merry del Val, Cardinal Secretary of State, assisted by Diomede Panici, titular archbishop of Laodicea, secretary of the Congregation of Rites, and by Giuseppe Cecchini, titular bishop of Alicarnasso, Archpriest of Altamura and Acquaviva delle Fonti.

== Cardinalate ==
Frühwirth was created a Cardinal-Priest by Pope Benedict XV in the consistory of 6 December 1915, with his titular church the Basilica of Santi Cosma e Damiano, at which time the title was raised from a deaconry to a presbytery. He remained working at nunciature until November 1916.

Frühwirth later participated in the conclave of 1922 that elected Pope Pius XI who appointed him Major Penitentiary on 8 January 1925, with his holding the post until 9 December 1927. Upon his appointment as Chancellor of the Holy Roman Church, he took the title of San Lorenzo in Damaso.

Frühwirth died in 1933 at the age of 87.

== Notes ==
Catholic Church titles
Preceded by José Maria Larroca	Master of the Order of Preachers; 1891–1904	Succeeded by Hyacinthe Marie Cormier
Preceded by Oreste Giorgi	Major Penitentiary of Apostolic Penitentiary; 8 January 1925 – 9 December 1927	Succeeded by Lorenzo Lauri
Preceded by Ottavio Cagiano de Azevedo	Chancellor of the Holy Roman Church; 19 December 1927 – 9 February 1933	Succeeded by Tommaso Boggiani
Diplomatic posts
Preceded by Carlo Caputo	Apostolic Nuncio to Bavaria; 1907–1916	Succeeded by Giuseppe Aversa
