= Antonio Agliardi =

Italian Roman Catholic Cardinal (1832–1915)

His Eminence Antonio Agliardi
- Chancellor of the Apostolic Chancery
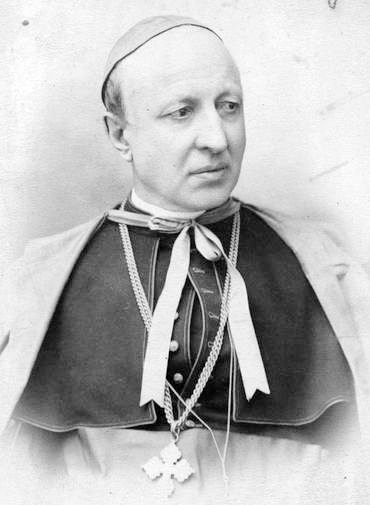
- The then-archbishop pictured sometime in the 1880s.
- Church: Roman Catholic Church
- Appointed: 29 June 1908
- Term ended: 19 March 1915
- Predecessor: Jean-Allarmet de Brogny
- Successor: Ottavio Cagiano de Azevedo
- Other posts: Cardinal-Bishop of Albano (1899–1915); Cardinal-Priest of San Lorenzo in Damaso in commendum (1903–15)
- Previous posts: Apostolic Delegate to East India (1884–87); Titular Archbishop of Caesarea Maritima (1884–96); Pro-Secretary of the Congregation for Extraordinary Ecclesiastical Affairs (1887–88); Secretary of the Congregation for Extraordinary Ecclesiastical Affairs (1888–89); Apostolic Nuncio to Bavaria (1889–93); Apostolic Nuncio to Austria-Hungary (1893–96); Cardinal-Priest of Santi Nereo ed Achilleo (1896–99); Camerlengo of the College of Cardinals (1898–99); Vice-Chancellor of the Apostolic Chancery (1903–08)

Orders
- Ordination: 22 December 1855
- Consecration: 12 October 1884 by Giovanni Simeoni
- Created cardinal: 22 June 1896 by Pope Leo XIII
- Rank: Cardinal-Priest (1896–99)

Personal details
- Born: 4 September 1832 Cologno al Serio, Bergamo, Kingdom of Lombardy–Venetia
- Died: 19 March 1915 (aged 82) Rome, Kingdom of Italy
- Parents: Domenico Agliardi; Lidia Vimercati
- Education: Roman Seminary; Pontifical Roman Athenaeum Saint Apollinare
- Coat of arms

Antonio Agliardi (4 September 1832 – 19 March 1915) was an Italian Roman Catholic Cardinal, archbishop, and papal diplomat.

== Biography ==
Agliardi was born at Cologno al Serio, in what is now the Province of Bergamo.

He studied theology and canon law, and after acting as parish priest in his native diocese for twelve years was sent by the pope to Canada as a bishop's chaplain. On his return, he was appointed secretary to the Congregation of the Propaganda.

In 1884, he was created by Pope Leo XIII Archbishop of Caesarea in partibus and sent to India as an Apostolic Delegate to report on the establishment of the hierarchy there.

In 1887, he again visited India, to carry out the terms of the concordat arranged with Portugal. The same year, he was appointed secretary of the Congregation super negotiis ecclesiae extraordinariis. In 1889, he became papal Apostolic Nuncio to Bavaria at Munich and in 1892 at Vienna. Allowing himself to be involved in the ecclesiastical disputes that divided Hungary in 1895, he was made the subject of formal complaint by the Hungarian government and in 1896 was recalled.

In the consistory of 1896, he was elevated to Cardinal-Priest of Santi Nereo e Achilleo. In 1899, he was made Cardinal Bishop of Albano. In 1903, he was named vice-chancellor of the Catholic Church, and became the Chancellor of the Apostolic Chancery in the Secretariat of State in 1908.

He died in Rome and was buried in Bergamo.

== Episcopal lineage ==
Agliardi's episcopal lineage, or apostolic succession was:

- Cardinal Scipione Rebiba
- Cardinal Giulio Antonio Santorio
- Cardinal Girolamo Bernerio
- Archbishop Galeazzo Sanvitale
- Cardinal Ludovico Ludovisi
- Cardinal Luigi Caetani
- Cardinal Ulderico Carpegna
- Cardinal Paluzzo Paluzzi Altieri degli Albertoni
- Pope Benedict XIII
- Pope Benedict XIV
- Cardinal Enrico Enríquez
- Archbishop Manuel Quintano Bonifaz
- Cardinal Buenaventura Fernández de Córdoba Spínola
- Cardinal Giuseppe Doria Pamphili
- Pope Pius VIII
- Pope Pius IX
- Cardinal Alessandro Franchi
- Cardinal Giovanni Simeoni
- Cardinal Antonio Agliardi

== Notes ==
Catholic Church titles
Preceded by himself as Vice Chancellor	Chancellor of the Holy Roman Church; 1908–1915	Succeeded by Ottavio Cagiano de Azevedo
Preceded by None	Apostolic Delegate to the East Indies; 23 Sep 1884 – 9 May 1887	Succeeded by Andrea Aiuti
