= Antonio Saverio De Luca =

Italian bishop

His Eminence Antonio Saverio De Luca
- Prefect of the Congregation for Studies
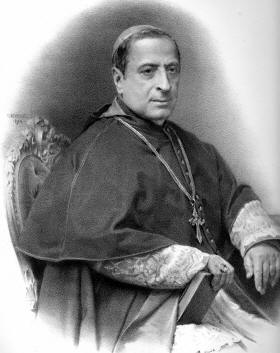
- Church: Roman Catholic Church
- Appointed: 13 August 1878
- Term ended: 28 December 1883
- Predecessor: Lorenzo Nina
- Successor: Giuseppe Pecci
- Other posts: Cardinal-Protector of the Pontifical Ecclesiastical Academy (1877–83); Cardinal-Bishop of Palestrina (1878–83); Cardinal-Priest of San Lorenzo in Damaso in commendum (1878–83); Vice-Chancellor of the Apostolic Chancery (1878–83)
- Previous posts: Bishop of Aversa (1845–53); Titular Archbishop of Tarsus (1853–63); Apostolic Nuncio to Bavaria (1853–56); Apostolic Nuncio to Austria-Hungary (1856–63); Cardinal-Priest of Santi Quattro Coronati (1863–78); Prefect of the Congregation of the Index (1864–78); Camerlengo of the College of Cardinals (1873–74)

Orders
- Ordination: 10 February 1839 by Antonio Luigi Piatti
- Consecration: 8 December 1845 by Giacomo Filippo Fransoni
- Created cardinal: 16 March 1863 by Pope Pius IX
- Rank: Cardinal-Priest (1863–78); Cardinal-Bishop (1878–83)

Personal details
- Born: Antonio Saverio De Luca; 25 October 1805 Bronte, Kingdom of Sicily
- Died: 28 December 1883 (aged 78) Rome, Kingdom of Italy
- Parents: Vincenzo De Luca; Francesca Saitta
- Education: University of Louvain

Antonio Saverio De Luca (28 October 1805 – 28 December 1883) was an Italian bishop and prefect of the Pontifical Congregation for Studies as well as Cardinal-Priest of San Lorenzo in Damaso and Cardinal-Bishop of Palestrina.

== Biography ==
Born Bronte, Sicily, he was ordained on 10 February 1839, aged 33, as Priest of Monreale, Italy. On 24 November 1845 he was appointed as Bishop of Aversa. Two months later he was ordained as Bishop of Aversa.

On 22 December 1853, aged 48, he was appointed as Titular Archbishop of Tarsus. On 24 December 1853, aged 48, he was appointed as Apostolic Nuncio to Bavaria. On 9 September 1856 he was appointed Apostolic Nuncio to Austria.

On 16 March 1863, aged 57, he was appointed Cardinal-Priest of Santi Quattro Coronati and elevated to the Cardinalate. On 15 July 1878, he was promoted Cardinal-Bishop of Palestrina by Pope Leo XIII He was named Vice-Chancellor of the Holy Roman Church on the same day, and was granted the titular church of S. Lorenzo in Damaso held in commendam (under administration), a church to which a Vice-Chancellor was usually assigned. He was appointed Prefect of the Congregation for Studies on 13 August 1878.

He died in Rome on 28 December 1883, aged 78.

== Sources ==
- Bräuer, Martin (2014), Handbuch der Kardinäle: 1846-2012 (in German), Berlin: De Gruyter, pp. 71–72, ISBN 978-3-11-026947-5
