= Tommaso Pio Boggiani =

Italian prelate (1863–1942)

His Eminence Tommaso Pio Boggiani O.P.
- Chancellor of the Apostolic Chancery
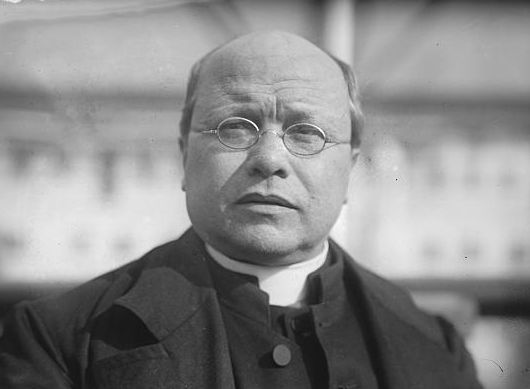
- Church: Roman Catholic Church
- Appointed: 13 March 1933
- Term ended: 26 February 1942
- Predecessor: Andreas Franz Frühwirth
- Successor: Celso Benigno Luigi Costantini
- Other posts: Cardinal-Bishop of Porto e Santa Rufina (1929–42); Cardinal-Priest of San Lorenzo in Damaso in commendam (1933–42)
- Previous posts: Bishop of Adria (1908–12); Titular Archbishop of Edessa (1912–16); Apostolic Delegate to Mexico (1912–14); Apostolic Administrator of Genoa (1914–15); Assessor of the Consistorial Congregation (1914–16); Secretary of the College of Cardinals (1914–16); Cardinal-Priest of Santi Quirico e Giulitta (1916–29); Archbishop of Genoa (1919–21)

Orders
- Ordination: 22 July 1885
- Consecration: 22 November 1908 by Rafael Merry del Val y Zulueta
- Created cardinal: 4 December 1916 by Pope Benedict XV
- Rank: Cardinal-Priest (1916–29); Cardinal-Bishop (1929–42)

Personal details
- Born: Pio Boggiani; 19 January 1863 Bosco Marengo, Alessandria, Kingdom of Sardinia
- Died: 26 February 1942 (aged 79) Rome, Kingdom of Italy
- Coat of arms

Styles of Tommaso Boggiani
- Reference style: His Eminence
- Spoken style: Your Eminence
- Informal style: Cardinal
- See: Porto e Santa Rufina (suburbicarian see)

Tommaso Pio Boggiani O.P. (19 January 1863 – 26 February 1942) was an Italian prelate of the Catholic Church who had a varied career that included a stint as the Apostolic Delegate to Mexico, service as bishop of Adria and archbishop of Genoa, and senior assignments in the Roman Curia. He was a member of the Dominicans and was made a cardinal in 1916.

== Biography ==
Pio Boggiani was born in Bosco Marengo, Alessandria, Italy, on 19 January 1863. (Note: Harris M Lentz) He joined the Dominicans on 15 September 1879, changing his name from Pio to Tommaso. He was ordained a priest and worked as a missionary in Constantinople. He was elected prior of the Dominican convent in Ragusa in 1891. He served as pastor of the parish of S. Maria di Castello in Genoa in 1900 but left to join the faculty of the seminary in Genoa. In 1908, he was appointed apostolic administrator of the Diocese of Adria.

Pope Pius X appointed him bishop of Adria on 31 October 1908. He received his episcopal consecration on 22 November 1908 from Cardinal Rafael Merry del Val.

He was named titular archbishop of Edessa di Osroene on 9 January 1912 and was named apostolic delegate to Mexico the next day.

He was appointed apostolic administrator of Genoa on 7 March 1914.

He served as secretary of the 1914 conclave that elected Pope Benedict XV.

Pope Benedict created him Cardinal-Priest of Santi Quirico e Giulitta at the consistory of 4 December 1916.

He was appointed Archbishop of Genoa on 10 March 1919; he resigned that position in 1921.

In 1920, he spoke out against the People's Party, as being anti-Catholic.

He participated in the 1922 conclave that elected Pope Pius XI.

He opted the rank of Cardinal Bishop, taking the suburbicarian see of Porto e Santa Rufina on 15 July 1929.

In 1935, he was appointed as Chancellor of the Holy Roman Church.

He took part in the 1939 conclave that elected Pope Pius XII.

He died on 26 February 1942 and was buried in the parish church of Boscomarengo.

== Notes ==
Catholic Church titles
Preceded by Edoardo Pulciano	Archbishop of Genoa; 10 March 1919 – 1921	Succeeded by Pietro Boetto
Preceded by Andreas Franz Frühwirth	Chancellor of the Holy Roman Church; 1933–1942	Succeeded by Celso Costantini
