= Giordano Pironti =

Italian cardinal and aristocrat

Giordano Pironti dei Conti di Terracina (born Terracina, ca. 1210; died in Viterbo, 1 October 1269) was an Italian aristocrat, papal bureaucrat, and Roman Catholic Cardinal. His family included a brother, Pietro, and three nephews, Pietro, Giovanni and Paolo.

On 12 June 1256, a document is signed by Pironti as Magister, Subdiaconus and Notarius.

Joachim Johrendt labels it as 'unsicher' ('uncertain') whether Giordano Pironti was a Canon of the Vatican Basilica before he became a cardinal. It is pointed out that in his Testament Cardinal Pironti left a legacy to the Basilica, and that persons who held his office as Vice-Chancellor sometimes were also Canons of the Vatican Basilica. This is very thin material indeed. The canonry is more 'imaginary' than 'uncertain'.

From 1257 (at some point between March and June) to 1262 he was Vice-Chancellor of the Holy Roman Church.

He was named a Cardinal by Pope Urban IV in the Consistory of 22 May 1262, and was assigned the Deaconry of SS. Cosma e Damiano. The Pope died in Perugia on 2 October 1264, where he had fled after being driven from Orvieto by his enemies. He had reigned, though never from Rome, for three years, one month, and four days. His funeral took place in the Cathedral Church of S. Lorenzo in Perugia. "His rule was as devoid of grandeur as his policy of any actual result." There were twenty-one cardinals at the death of the Pope, including Cardinal Giordano Pironti, but three were unable to make it to Perugia in time to take part in the Electoral meetings, Simon de Brion (who was Legate in France), Simon Paltinieri (who was governor of Campania for Urban IV) and Guido Grosso Fulcodi (Guy Folques), who had been sent as Legate to England, but was being obstructed from crossing over from France. There was a period of only five days between the death of Urban IV and the election of his successor, which suggests that the Electoral meeting probably began on 5 October, and the scrutinies began on 6 October. On 8 October, the Cardinals elected Guido Grosso Fulcodi, though he was absent. He finally reached Perugia and had his election confirmed by his enthronement on 5 February 1265. He chose the throne name Clement IV.

Cardinal Giordano was Rector of the Roman Campania, ca. 1267; he brought mounted soldiers and foot to the siege of Giovanni di Frangipani's castle in aid of Robert de Lavena, the Captain of the Galleys of Provence. On 6 November 1268, he was asked by Pope Clement IV to settle a dispute between the Bishop of Anagni and Raynaldus Rubeus. Three weeks later, on 29 November 1268, Pope Clement died at his residence in the Episcopal Palace in Viterbo. The longest vacancy of the papal throne began; it lasted two years and nine months.

On 9 September 1269 he added a codicil to his Will, in favor of his brother Peter, his nephews and grandnephews. He died during the Sede Vacante of 1268–1271, on 1 October 1269, and was buried in Viterbo. He did not participate in the forced enclosure of the Cardinals by the government of Viterbo, which has come to be thought of as the first Conclave, nor did he sign the famous letter of 6 June 1270, in which the Cardinals complain of their treatment. He was dead before either of those events occurred.

== Bibliography ==
- Agostino Paravicini-Bagliani, I testament dei Cardinali del Duecento (Roma 1980).
- Cardinals created by Urban IV
