= Aleatory contract =

An aleatory contract is a contract where an uncertain event outside of the parties' control determines their rights and obligations.

The classification developed in later medieval Roman law to cover all contracts whose fulfilment depended on chance. Today it applies to contracts in which the duration and amount of payments by one side will vary according to uncertain events, as happens in gambling, insurance, speculative investment and life annuities. The concept is similar to that of gharari contracts prohibited under Islamic law.

In the Louisiana Civil Code, an aleatory contract exists "when, because of its nature or according to the parties' intent, the performance of either party's obligation, or the extent of the performance, depends on an uncertain event." Gambling, wagering, or betting may be aleatory contracts. Insurance policies may also be considered aleatory. Modern derivatives and options may in some cases also be considered aleatory contracts.

The French civil code contains a chapter on aleatory contracts, with specific provisions for gaming (gambling) and life annuities. The parties must take on a chance of benefit or loss based on an uncertain event, distinguishing it from commutative contracts in which the reciprocal performance is regarded to be of equivalent value. French legal scholar Marcel Planiol said that, compared to something like the difference between unilateral and bilateral contracts, the distinction between commutative and aleatory contracts "is hardly of any importance." Commentators have expressed doubt as to whether under the French Civil Code there must be uncertainty for both parties or just one.

Under Belgian law an aleatory contract can not be voided because of disadvantage. The parties have namely at the conclusion of the contract accepted that the performances of the parties can be extremely unequal. A judge can still void the contract when the chance is only illusory.
