= Girolamo Colonna di Sciarra =

Italian cardinal

His Eminence Girolamo Colonna di Sciarra
- Cardinal-Deacon of Sant'Agata de' Goti; Camerlengo of the Apostolic Chamber
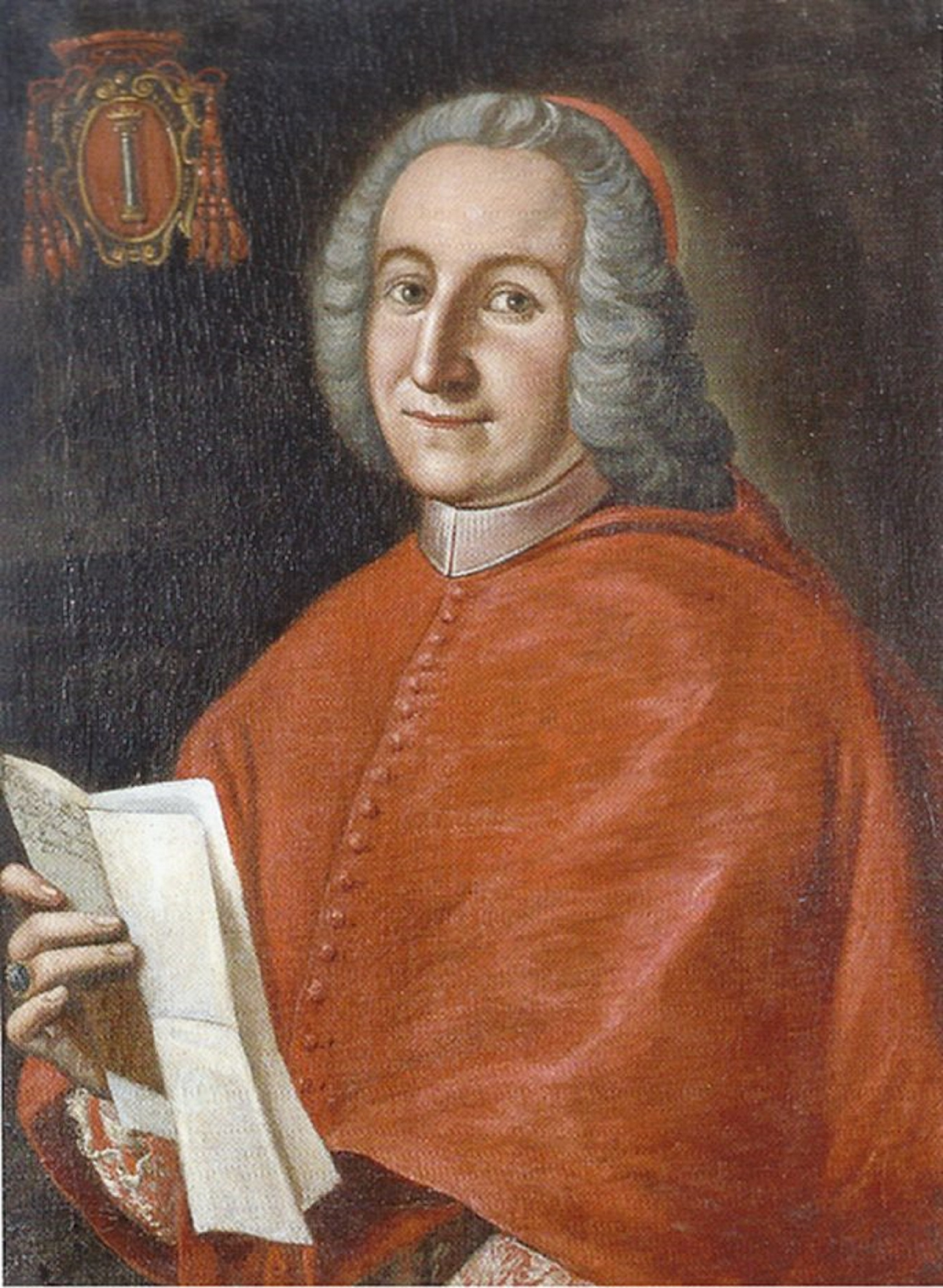
- Portrait of cardinal Colonna di Sciarra
- Church: Catholic Church

Personal details
- Born: 8 May 1708 Rome, Papal States
- Died: 18 January 1763 (age 54) Rome, Papal States

Girolamo Colonna di Sciarra (8 May 1708 – 18 January 1763) was an Italian Catholic Cardinal of the noble Colonna di Sciarra family.

== Biography ==
Born in Rome, he was the brother of Prospero Colonna di Sciarra and grand-uncle of Benedetto Barberini, who, after the merger of the Barberini and Colonna families, was also referred to as Benedetto Barberini Colonna di Sciarra. He was a distant relative of Oddone Colonna, who was elected to the papacy as Pope Martin V. He was also lay abbot of Santa Maria in Sylvis, in Friuli.

Between 1756 and his death at Rome in 1763, he was Camerlengo of the Holy Roman Church.

Catholic Church titles
Preceded by Ludovico Pico de Mirandola	Archpriest of the Basilica di Santa Maria Maggiore; 1743–1763	Succeeded by Marcantonio Colonna (iuniore)
Preceded by Prospero II Colonna	Cardinal-Deacon of Sant'Angelo in Pescheria; 1743	Succeeded by Flavio Chigi (iuniore)
Preceded by Tommaso Ruffo	Cardinal-Deacon of San Lorenzo in Damaso; 1753–1756	Succeeded by Alberico Archinto
Preceded by Luigi Maria Torreggiani	Cardinal-Deacon of Santi Cosma e Damiano; 1756–1760	Succeeded by Cornelio Caprara
Preceded by Silvio Valenti Gonzaga	Camerlengo of the Apostolic Chamber; 1756–1763	Succeeded by Carlo Rezzonico (iuniore)
Preceded by Agapito Mosca	Cardinal-Deacon of Sant'Agata de' Goti; 1760–1763	Succeeded by Prospero Colonna di Sciarra
