= Ottavio Cagiano de Azevedo =

Roman Catholic cardinal

His Eminence Ottavio Cagiano de Azevedo
- Chancellor of the Apostolic Chancery
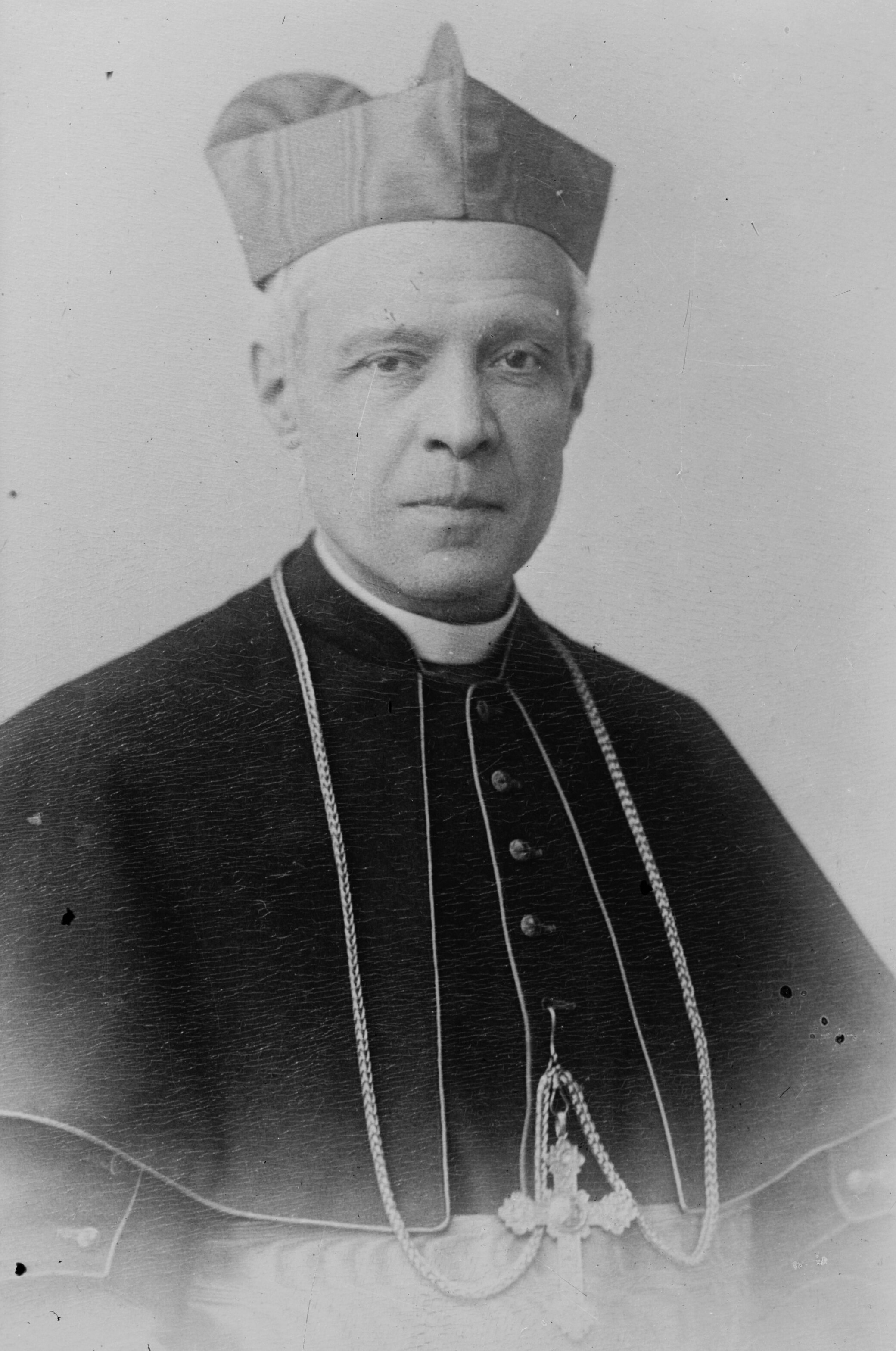
- Church: Roman Catholic Church
- Appointed: 6 December 1915
- Term ended: 11 July 1927
- Predecessor: Antonio Agliardi
- Successor: Andreas Franz Frühwirth
- Other post: Cardinal-Priest of San Lorenzo in Damaso (1915–27)
- Previous posts: Cardinal-Deacon of Santi Cosma e Damiano (1905–15); Pro-Prefect of the Congregation of Religious (1913); Prefect of the Congregation of Religious (1913–15)

Orders
- Ordination: September 1868
- Created cardinal: 11 December 1905 by Pope Pius X
- Rank: Cardinal-Priest

Personal details
- Born: Ottavio Cagiano de Azevedo; 7 November 1845 Frosinone, Papal States
- Died: 11 July 1927 (aged 81) Anzio, Rome, Kingdom of Italy
- Buried: Campo Verano
- Parents: Vincenzo Cagiano de Azevedo; Anna Cerroni

Styles of Ottavio Cagiano de Azevedo
- Reference style: His Eminence
- Spoken style: Your Eminence
- Informal style: Cardinal
- See: none

Ottavio Cagiano de Azevedo (7 November 1845 – 11 July 1927) was an Italian Cardinal of the Roman Catholic Church. He served as Prefect of the Sacred Congregation for Religious from 1913 to 1915, and was elevated to the cardinalate in 1905.

== Biography ==
Ottavio Cagiano de Azevedo was born in Frosinone, and held the title of count; he was a nephew of Cardinal Antonio Cagiano de Azevedo. He studied at the seminary in Grottaferrata, and was ordained to the priesthood in September 1868. Cagiano then did pastoral work in Rome until 1874, the same year he was made a canon of the Liberian Basilica on 1 April. He later became an abbreviatore del parco maggiore on 1 January 1876, protonotary apostolic ad instar participantium on 9 April 1880 and canon of St. Peter's Basilica on 3 December 1886.

On 31 December 1891, Cagiano was appointed Master of the Papal Chamber by Pope Leo XIII, and later papal majordomo on 29 May 1901. Raised to the rank of cardinal without ever receiving an episcopal ordination, he was created Cardinal Deacon of Santi Cosma e Damiano by Pope Pius X in the consistory of 11 December 1905.

After becoming Apostolic Visitor of the Hospice of Catechumens on 17 January 1911, Cagiano was named Pro-Prefect of the Sacred Congregation for Religious on 12 June 1913, rising to become full Prefect on the following 31 October. He was made Protector of the Order of the Servants of Mary on 10 March 1914 and then participated in the conclave of 1914, which selected Pope Benedict XV. During the conclave, Cagiano supposedly served as a scrutineer on the last day of balloting with Cardinals Bartolomeo Bacilieri and Rafael Merry del Val.

On 6 December 1915, he was named Chancellor of the Holy Roman Church, remaining in that post until his death. Cagiano, after ten years' standing as a Cardinal Deacon, opted for the order of Cardinal Priests and was assigned the titular church of San Lorenzo in Damaso in the consistory of the same date. He was also one of the cardinal electors in the conclave of 1922, which resulted in the election of Pope Pius XI.

In addition to being appointed a Grand Officer of the Order of the Crown of Siam, he was appointed a Grand Cross of the Order of Franz Joseph of Austria, of the Order of Isabella the Catholic of Spain, and of the Civil Order of Tuscany. He was also appointed a Commander with Plaque of the Order of the Red Eagle of Prussia and an Officer of the Légion d'honneur.

Cardinal Cagiano died in Anzio, at age 81. He is buried in the tomb of the Order of the Servants of Mary at the Campo Verano cemetery.

Catholic Church titles
Preceded by José Vives Tutó, OFM Cap	Prefect of the Sacred Congregation for Religious; 1913–1915	Succeeded by Domenico Serafini, OSB
Preceded by Antonio Agliardi	Chancellor of the Holy Roman Church; 1915–1927	Succeeded by Andreas Franz Frühwirth, OP
