= San Lorenzo in Damaso =

Roman Catholic basilica, a landmark of Rome, Italy

Basilica Minore di San Lorenzo in Damaso
- Minor Basilica of St. Lawrence in Damaso (in English); S. Laurentii in Damaso (in Latin)
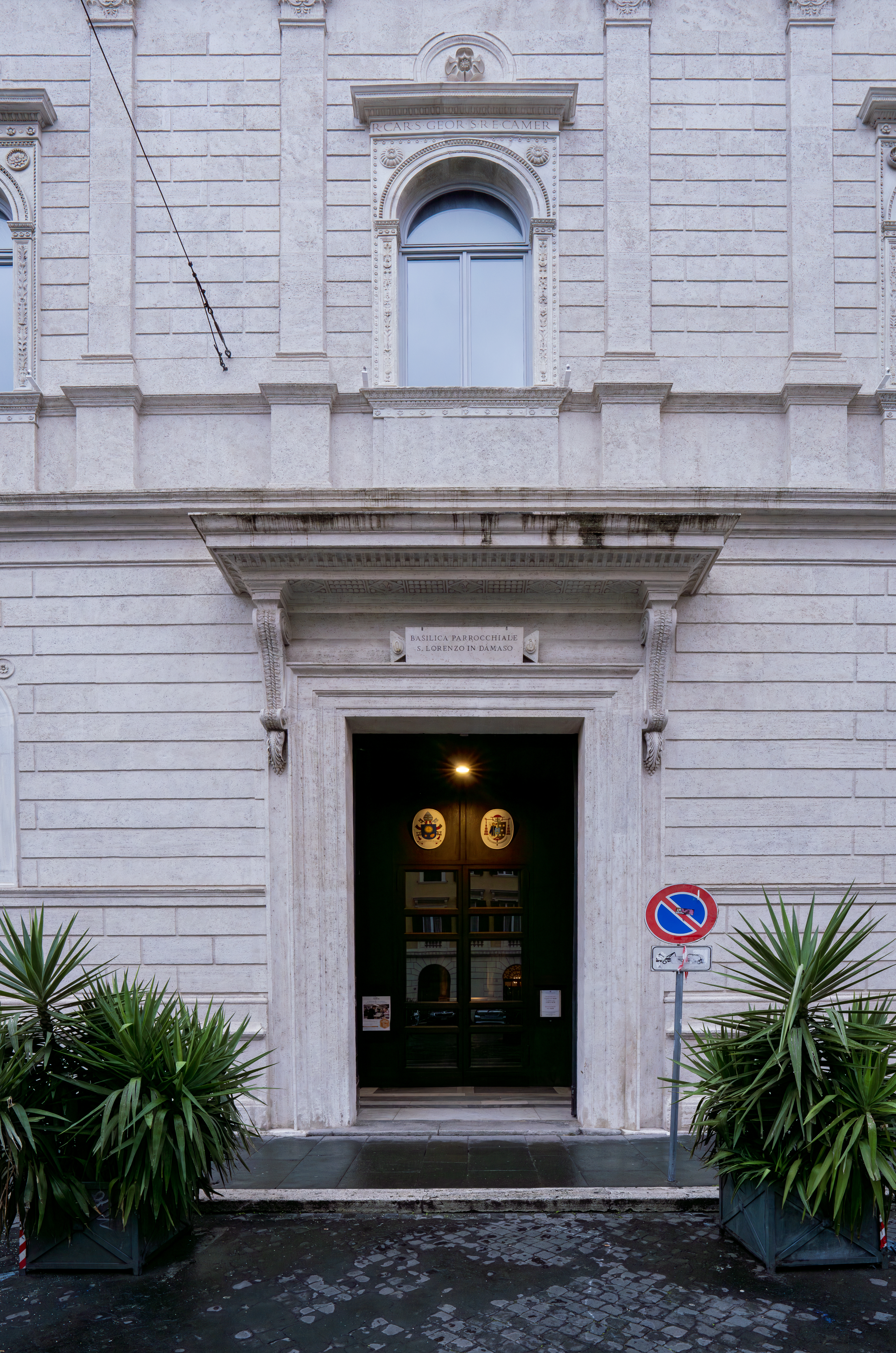
- Entrance to the Basilica, incorporated into the side façade of the Palazzo della Cancelleria.
- Click on the map for a fullscreen view
- 41°53′48.74″N 12°28′19.23″E
- Location: Piazza della Cancelleria 1, Rome
- Country: Italy
- Denomination: Catholic Church
- Tradition: Roman Rite
- Website: sanlorenzoindamaso.it

History
- Status: Titular church, minor basilica
- Dedication: Saint Lawrence

Architecture
- Architectural type: Church
- Groundbreaking: 15th century
- Completed: 18th century

Administration
- District: Lazio
- Province: Rome

The Minor Basilica of St. Lawrence in Damaso (Basilica Minore di San Lorenzo in Damaso) or simply San Lorenzo in Damaso is a parish and titular church in central Rome, Italy that is dedicated to St. Lawrence, deacon and martyr. It is incorporated into the Palazzo della Cancelleria, which enjoys the extraterritoriality of the Holy See.

== History ==
Archaeological evidence suggests the site, like those of many churches in Rome, may have formerly housed a pagan temple. The first documentary evidence of a church at this site is the reference in the synod of Pope Symmachus of AD 499 of a Titulus Damasi. According to tradition, in the AD 380s a basilica church was erected by Pope Damasus I in his own residence. This church is one of many in Rome dedicated to St. Lawrence, including the more ancient and then extra-urban Basilica di San Lorenzo Fuori le Mura, that was rebuilt by the same Pope Damasus I. The original basilica of San Lorenzo in Damaso was demolished by Cardinal Raffaele Riario, a nephew of Pope Sixtus IV who commissioned the imposing Renaissance-style Palazzo della Cancelleria (1489–1513). The palace was built of spolia and stone from nearby ancient Roman buildings, including the Colosseum, and enveloped the new basilica of San Lorenzo in Damaso under the right wing; the entrance is located at Number 1, Piazza della Cancelleria, on the right flank of the façade.

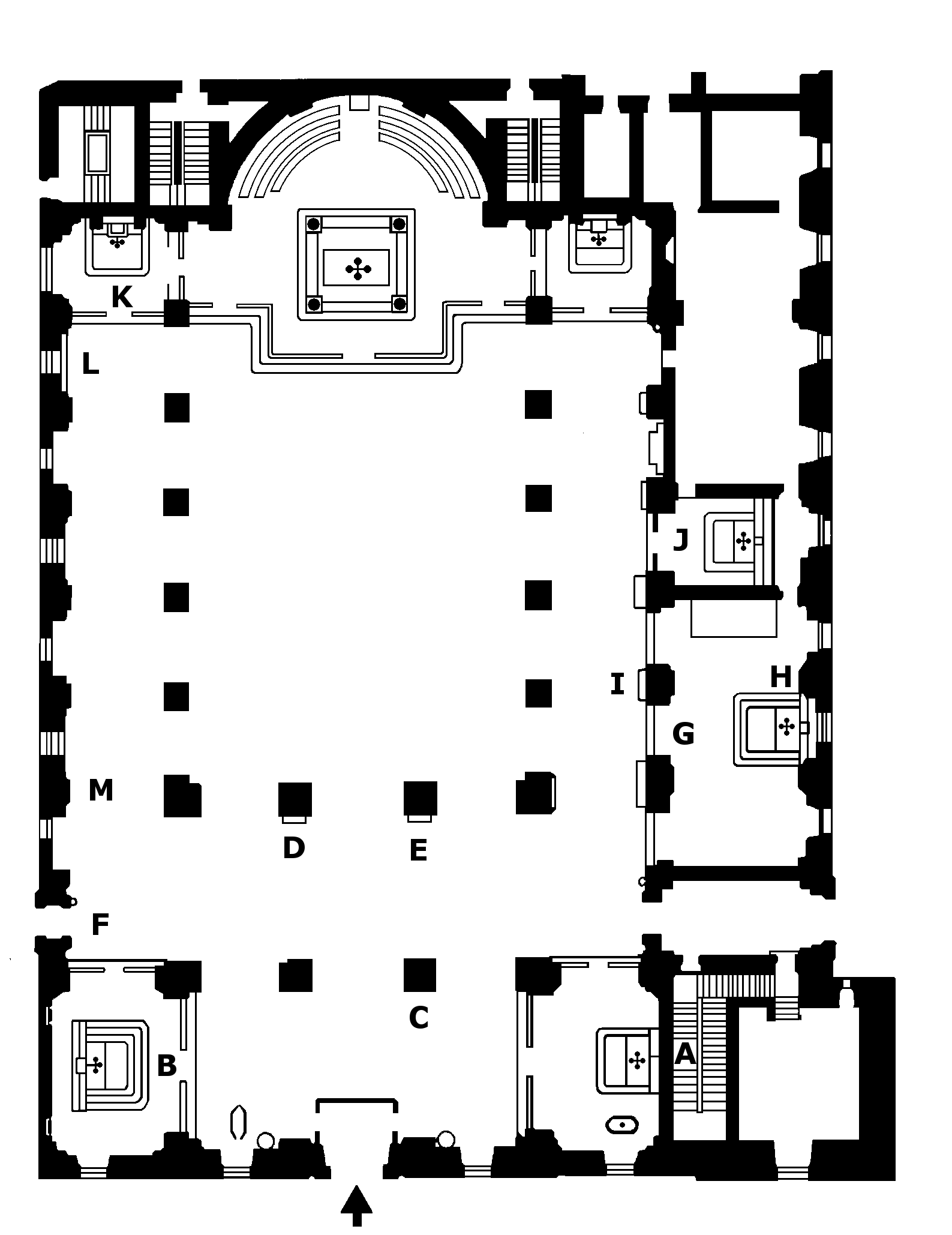
Floorplan

The architect of the basilica, like that of the Palace of the Chancellery, is unknown. The design of the Palace has been attributed to Francesco di Giorgio Martini and Baccio Pontelli, while Filippo Titi suggests Donato Bramante and other authors have cited Giuliano da Sangallo and Andrea Bregno. Titi also independently attributed reconstruction of the basilica to Bramante. The last restoration was necessary after a fire damaged the basilica in 1944.

The inscriptions in the basilica are valuable illustrations of the history of the Roman Catholic Church, and were collected and published by Vincenzo Forcella.

The Cardinal Priest of the Titulus S. Laurentii in Damaso is Antonio Rouco Varela, former Archbishop of Madrid, Spain.

== Interior ==
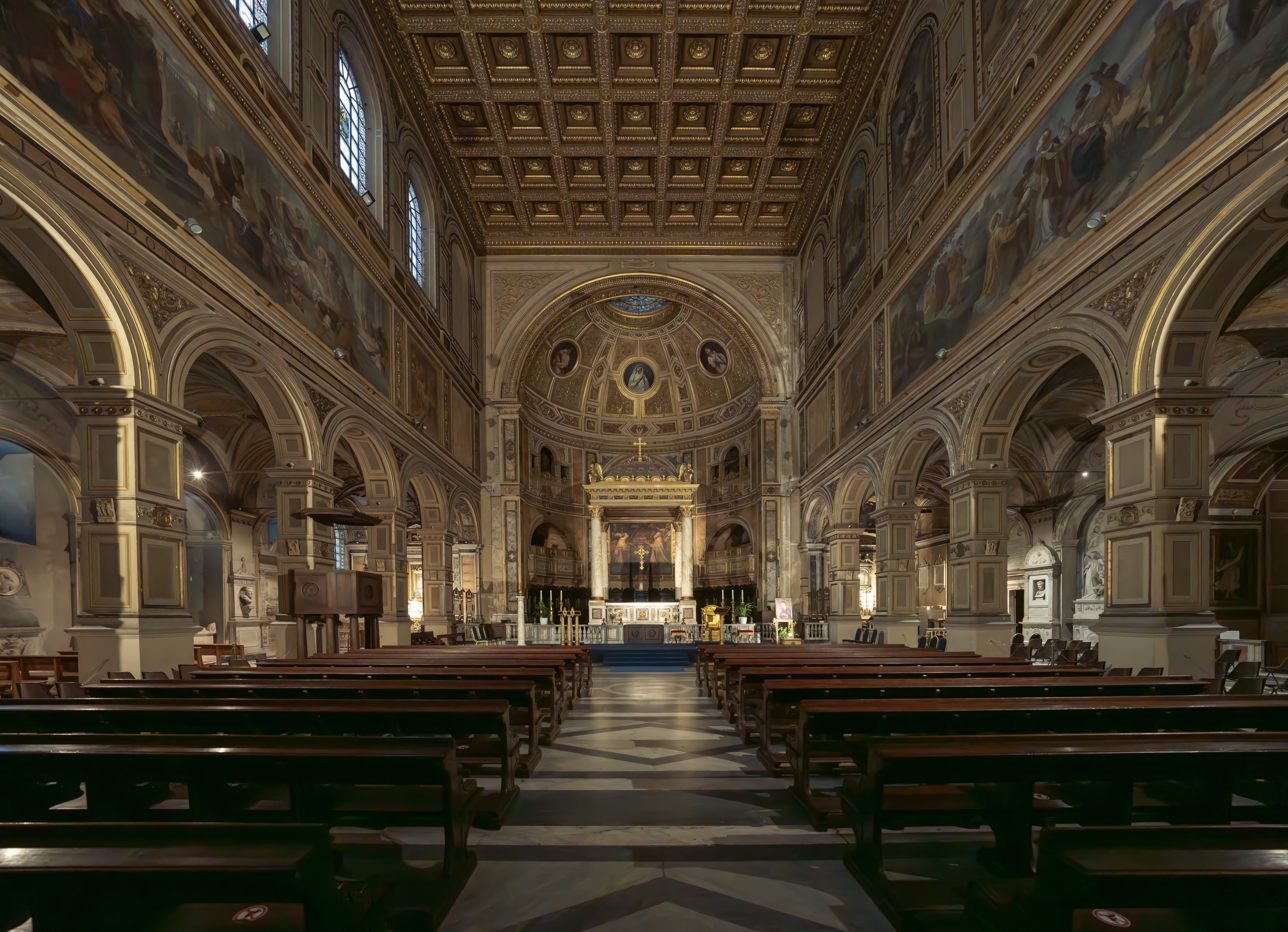
Interior of San Lorenzo

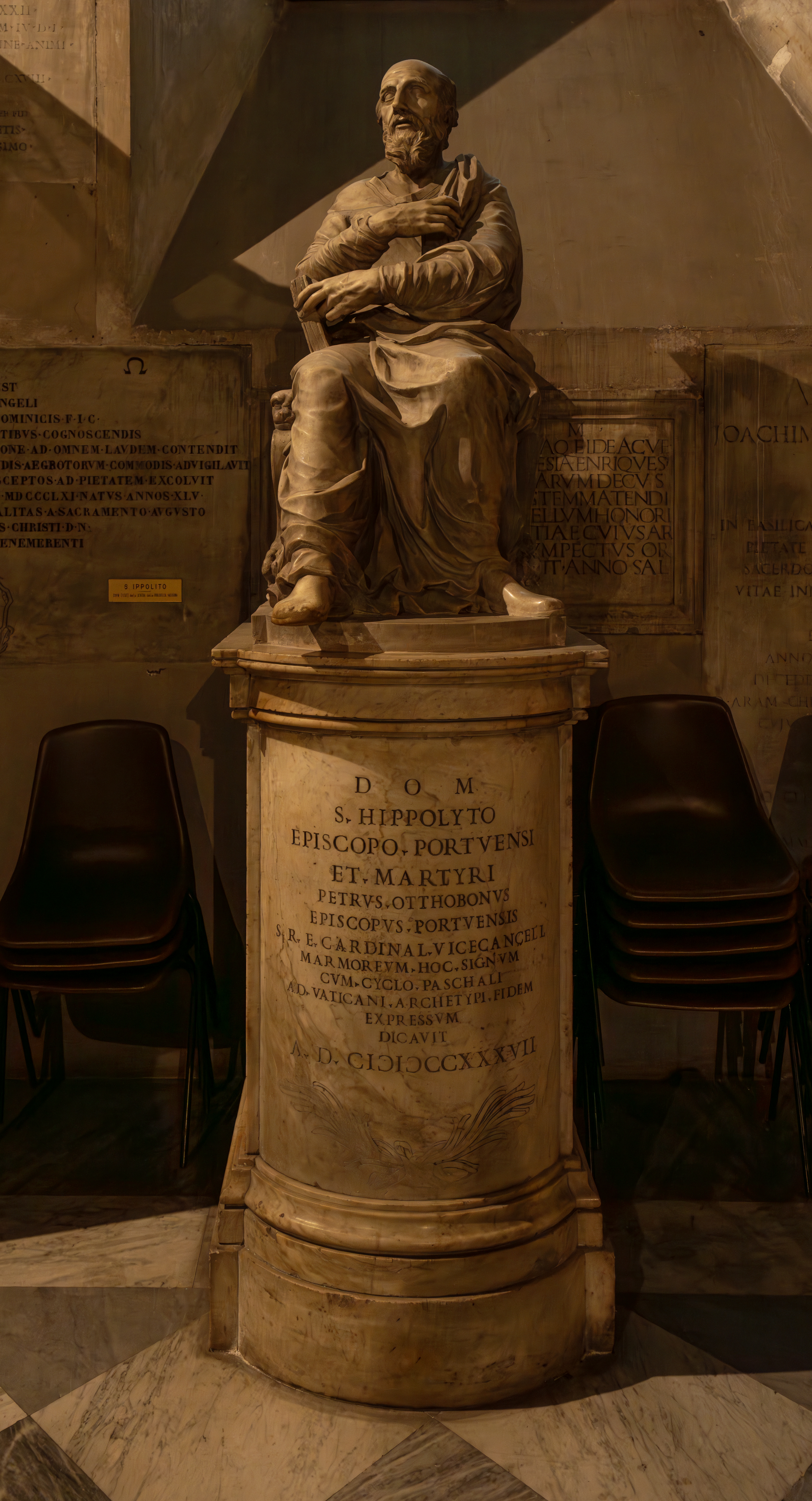
Seated Hippolytus at Vatican

The interior decoration was begun by commissions of the resident of the Palace, Cardinal Alessandro Farnese, in the late 16th century. Cavaliere d'Arpino painted the walls of the right counter-façade. The main altar hosts the painting of Saints and Coronation of St. Mary by Federico Zuccari. Below the altar are the relics of Pope Eutychian and Pope Damasus I. To the left of the altar is a copy of a statue of St. Hippolytus of Rome; the original is a restored antique statue in the Vatican Library. Tradition holds that St. Lawrence instigated the conversion of St. Hippolytus to the Catholic Faith. This copy was commissioned for the basilica by Cardinal Pietro Ottoboni. Vignola designed the portal. Immediately to the right of the entrance is the memorial to Alessandro Valtrini, a minister of Pope Urban VIII, that Gian Lorenzo Bernini designed in 1639. The second vestibule has statues of St. Francis Xavier and St. Charles Borromeo by Stefano Maderno.

=== Chapels ===
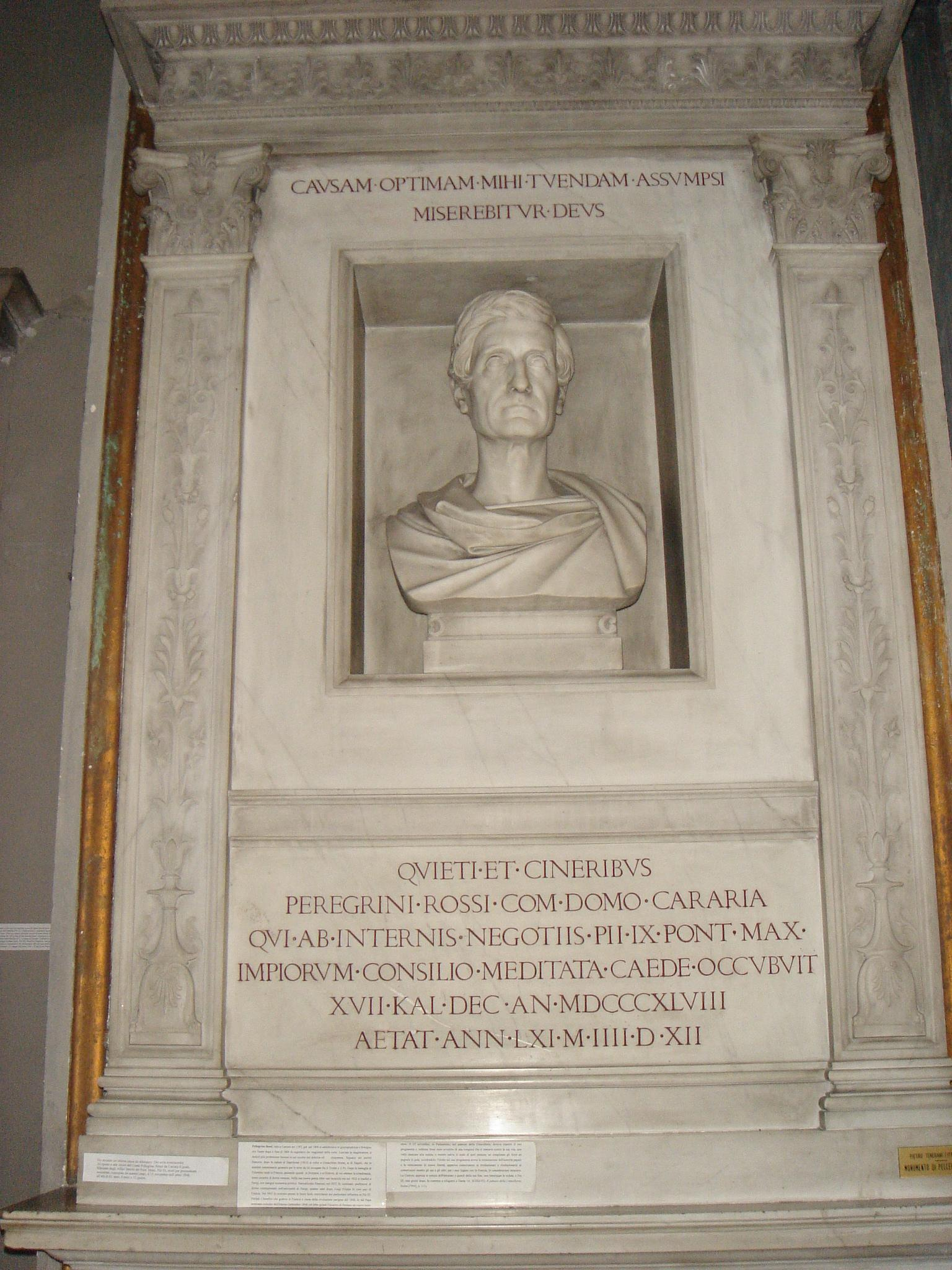
Monument for Pellegrino Rossi, sculpted by Pietro Tenerani.

To the right of the entrance is a chapel designed by Nicola Salvi and commissioned by Cardinal Tommaso Ruffo in the late 18th century. The ceiling is frescoed with Glory of San Nicola by Corrado Giaquinto, and the altarpiece of Virgin with Sts. Philip Neri and Nicolò was painted by Sebastiano Conca. To the left of the entrance is the Chapel of the Blessed Sacrament, which was commissioned by Cardinal Ottoboni and frescoed by Andrea Casali. The altarpiece is the Last Supper by Vincenzo Berrettini.

Inside the basilica, the first chapel to the right of the nave has a 19th-century monument to Prince Camillo Massimi and his wife, by Filippo Gnaccarini and Pietro Tenerani, respectively.

The second chapel to the right has the tomb of Pellegrino Rossi, the last minister of the Papal States under Bl. Pope Pius IX, by Pietro Tenerani. His murder in 1848 in the adjacent Palace was one of the events that led to the ensconcement of the Pope in the Vatican City and the annexation of the Papal States to the Kingdom of Italy.

The first chapel to the left has the tomb and funerary monument of Cardinal Ludovico Trevisan, Patriarch of Aquileia, with a recumbent statue by Paolo Romano.

The second chapel to the left contains the tomb of Fra Annibal Caro (1566) by Giovanni Antonio Dosio.

A chapel near the sacristy has an altarpiece depicting the Madonna delle Gioie by Nicolò Circignani, denominated "il Pomarancio", and two silver statues of St. Lawrence and St. Damaso by Ciro Ferri.

A further chapel is dedicated to the Sacred Heart of the Agonizing Jesus, and contains a portrait of Pope Leo XIII proclaiming the statutes of the Pious Union of the Sacred Heart of Jesus by the chapel's 19th century architect Vincenzo De Rossi Re. The founding of this fraternity was celebrated in the basilica in 1883.

The Chapel of the Santissima Concezione was completed and frescoed (1635-8) by a young Pietro da Cortona. Other works include the monument of Cardinal Trevisan (1505).

== List of Cardinal Protectors ==
- Joannes (attested 1044)
- Leo (c. 1059–c. 1084)
- Risus (c. 1105–c. 1116)
- Deusdedit (1116–c. 1129)
- Angelo 1133-1138
- Yves 1138-1143
- Guido Moricotti 1143-1150
- Nikolaus 1150-1151
- Giovanni Paparoni 1151-1158
- Pietro di Miso 1165-1182
- Pedro de Cardona 1182-1183
- Uberto Allucingoli 1183-1185
- Uberti Crivelli (Pope Urban III) 1185-1187
- Pietro 1188-1190
- Pierre Duacensis 1212-1216
- Pietro Campano 1216-1217
- Matteo D'Acquasparta 1288-1291
- Francesco Ronci 1291-1294
- Nicolas L'Aide 1294-1299
- Arnaud Nouvel, O. Cist. 25 July 1317 - 17 August 1317
- Hugues Roger 20 September 1342 - 21 October 1363
- Pierre de Banac 22 September 1368 - 7 October 1369
- Pietro Corsini 7 June 1370 - 1374
- Bartolomeo da Cogorno 21 December 1381 - 25 December 1381
- Angelo Acciaioli 20 November 1385 - 29 August 1397
- Giordano Orsini 25 March 1400 - June 1412; June 1412 - 29 May 1438
- Ludovico Scarampi-Mezzarota Trevisano 1 July 1440 - 7 January 1465
- Raffaele Sansone Riario della Rovere 5 May 1480 - 29 November 1503; 29 November 1503 - 22 June 1517
- Giulio de Medici (Pope Clement VII) 6 June 1517 - 19 November 1523
- Pompeo Colonna 11 January 1524 - 28 June 1532
- Ippolito de Medici 3 July 1532 - 10 August 1535
- Alessandro Farnese 13 August 1535 - 14 April 1564; 14 April 1564 - 12 May 1564; 12 May 1564 - 2 March 1589
- Alessandro Damasceni Peretti 13 March 1589 - 30 March 1620; 30 March 1620 - 2 June 1623
- Ludovico Ludovisi 7 June 1623 - 18 November 1632
- Francesco Barberini 21 November 1632 - 14 November 1644; 14 November 1644 - 10 December 1679
- Lorenzo Raggi 6 February 1679 - 8 January 1680
- Pietro Ottoboni 14 November 1689 - 26 June 1724; 26 June 1724 - 29 January 1725; 29 January 1725 - 29 February 1740
- Tommaso Ruffo 29 August 1740 - 16 February 1753
- Girolamo Colonna di Sciarra 12 March 1753 - 20 September 1756
- Alberico Archinto 20 September 1756 - 30 September 1758
- Carlo Rezzonico (iuniore) 22 November 1758 - 24 January 1763
- Henry Benedict Mary Clement Stuart of York 14 January 1763 - 13 July 1807
- Francesco Carafa di Trajetto 3 August 1807 - 20 September 1818
- Giulio Maria della Somaglia 2 October 1818 - 2 April 1830
- Tommaso Arezzo 5 July 1830 - 3 July 1833
- Carlo Maria Pedicini 19 December 1834 - 19 November 1843
- Tommaso Bernetti 22 January 1844 - 21 March 1852
- Luigi Amat di San Filippo e Sorso 27 September 1852 - 30 March 1878
- Antonio Saverio De Luca 15 July 1878 - 28 December 1883
- Teodolfo Martel 24 March 1884 - 11 July 1899
- Lucido Maria Parocchi 14 December 1899 - 15 January 1903
- Antonio Agliardi 22 June 1903 - 19 March 1915
- Ottavio Cagiano de Azevedo 6 December 1915 - 11 July 1927
- Andreas Franz Frühwirth, OP 19 December 1927 - 9 February 1933
- Tommaso Pio Boggiani, OP 13 March 1933 - 26 February 1942
- Celso Benigno Luigi Costantini 9 June 1958 - 17 October 1958
- Santiago Luis Copello 14 December 1959 - 9 February 1967
- Luigi Traglia 28 April 1969 - 15 March 1972
- Narciso Jubany Arnau 5 March 1973 - 26 December 1996
- Antonio Maria Rouco Varela 21 February 1998 – present

== Sources ==
- Hüls, Rudolf (1977). Kardinal, Klerus und Kirchen Roms: 1049–1130, Tübingen: Max Niemeyer 1977. (in German)
- Pietro da Cortona, A Design for a Quarantore at San Lorenzo in Damaso, c. 1632

Preceded by Santi Giovanni e Paolo al Celio	Landmarks of Rome; San Lorenzo in Damaso	Succeeded by San Lorenzo in Lucina
