= Tommaso Bernetti =

Italian Roman Catholic cardinal and Secretariat of State

His Eminence Tommaso Bernetti
- Vice-Chancellor of the Apostolic Chancery
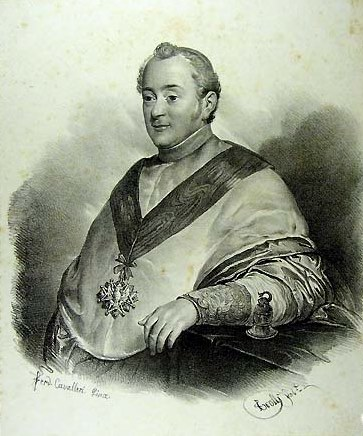
- Church: Roman Catholic Church
- Appointed: 22 January 1844
- Term ended: 21 March 1852
- Predecessor: Carlo Maria Pedicini
- Successor: Luigi Amat di San Filippo e Sorso
- Other post: Cardinal-Deacon pro illa vice of San Lorenzo in Damaso (1844–52)
- Previous posts: Cardinal-Deacon of San Cesareo in Palatio (1827–44); Pro-Secretary of State (1831); Secretary of State (1831–36)

Orders
- Ordination: 1839 by Alessandro Bernetti
- Created cardinal: 2 October 1826 by Pope Leo XII
- Rank: Cardinal-Deacon

Personal details
- Born: Tommaso Bernetti; 29 December 1779 Fermo, Papal States
- Died: 21 March 1852 (aged 72) Fermo, Papal States

Tommaso Bernetti (29 December 1779 – 21 March 1852) was an Italian Roman Catholic prelate and cardinal who served in the Secretariat of State and the Roman Curia during his time in the cardinalate. He came from Fermo and was named a cardinal in 1826 before beginning his work in the Curia. He had worked prior to his time in the cardinalate as a papal legate and governor with a dispensation for not having been a priest at that point.

== Life ==
Tommaso Bernetti was born to the noble patricians Count Salvatore Bernetti and Countess Giuditta Brancadoro in Fermo on 29 December 1779. His uncle Cesare Brancadoro on his maternal side was a cardinal that Pope Pius VII named in 1801 and his brother Alessandro became a bishop.

Bernetti studied both law and literature at a college in Fermo and later received the tonsure on 21 February 1801. He travelled to Paris as well as to Reims and later at Fontainebleau alongside his cardinal uncle following the Napoleon-led French invasion of Rome in 1809 that forced his uncle into exile. The pair were able to return to Rome later in 1814 after Pope Pius VII re-entered Rome following his own exile. He was appointed as the pro-legate to Ferrara from mid-1815 until 1816 and held a series of other positions such as Governor of Rome and Vice-Camerlengo from 1820 until 1826 despite not having been an ordained priest at that stage. His diplomatic duties also extended to being made an ambassador to the coronation of Czar Nicholas I of Russia in 1826 and he left Rome on 13 June to join Cardinal Tommaso Arezzo. He was unable to attend the coronation in Moscow for reasons unknown though did meet the czar later in Saint Petersburg instead on 22 October. He returned to Paris following this.

It was during his time in Paris that he learnt that Pope Leo XII intended to elevate him into the cardinalate on 2 October 1826. He arrived in Rome not long after and months later received his red biretta and his title as Cardinal-Deacon of San Cesareo in Palatio. Bernetti later participated in the 1829 conclave that elected Pope Pius VIII and again in the 1830-31 conclave that elected Pope Gregory XVI. Bernetti during this time served in the Secretariat of State. The separate position of Cardinal Secretary for Internal State Affairs was created by Gregory XVI in 1833 at Bernetti's request, to reduce his workload as the Secretary of State. Bernetti's brother Alessandro ordained him as a priest in 1839. In 1836 he left the Secretariat of State and in 1844 was appointed as the Vice-Chancellor for the Apostolic Chancery; in 1844 he opted to become the Cardinal-Deacon of San Lorenzo in Damaso reduced pro illa vice.

Bernetti participated in the papal conclave in 1846 that elected Pope Pius IX. He himself had been considered a possible contender and his candidature was supported by the Russians and the Prussians, but he was not a serious contender as he suffered from gout and was considered too old. Bernetti favored Giovanni Mastai-Ferretti to become pope but soon learnt that the Austrian Emperor Ferdinand I wanted to invoke the right of veto against the latter. He realized he had to act fast to secure votes for him and so - in an effort to also prevent his rival Luigi Lambruschini from being elected - lobbied other cardinals to secure the votes needed for Mastai-Ferretti, therefore leading to his election before the veto could be imposed. He later sought refuge in Sant'Elpidio following the assassination of Pellegrino Rossi and later joined Pius IX in Gaeta in 1848. In 1849 he returned to his hometown of Fermo and would live there until his death.

Bernetti died in Fermo on 21 March 1852 and his remains were interred in Fermo Cathedral.

== Honours ==
- Poland: Order of the White Eagle, 1826
