= Sede vacante =

Term in Catholic Canon law

The umbraculum, the arms of the Holy See under sede vacante.

Sede vacante (Note: Latin pronunciation: [ˈseːde vaˈkante], lit. 'with the chair [being] vacant') (Note: An ablative absolute construction; the phrase in the nominative case is sedes vacans. The term in Ancient Greek: εν χηρεία, romanized: en chēreía, lit. 'in widowhood'.) (Latin for "the seat being vacant") is the period during which a Catholic diocese or archdiocese has no prelate in office, with the prelate's office being the cathedral. (Note: Some are also used as a place of residence if the prelate lives within the cathedral compound.)

The term is most commonly used to describe the interval between the death or resignation of a pope and the election of his successor, when the Holy See is temporarily without a pope.

During a sede vacante, the normal authority of the bishop or pope is suspended, and limited governance is carried out according to church law until a new officeholder is installed.

== History ==
During the medieval period, the archpriest, archdeacon and primicerius notariorum (chief of the notaries) in the papal court formed a regency council to govern during sede vacante periods.

It was the obligation of the Camerarius (papal chamberlain), the head of the Camera Apostolica, to formally establish the death of the pope. Gradually this led to the theory that the Camerarius as the chief of the Roman Curia should continue to conduct normal business upon the death of the pope and was tasked with the deceased pope's burial as well as the preparation for the new election. This process was evident during the tenure of Camerarius Boso Breakspeare, nephew of Pope Adrian IV, who served as chamberlain during the late 12th century. During the sede vacante of 1268 to 1271, the importance of the Camerarius was so clear that the cardinals prepared to elect a new one if he died.

The papacy was most recently sede vacante from 21 April to 8 May 2025 following the death of Pope Francis.

== Vacancy of the Holy See ==
After the death or resignation of a pope, the Holy See enters a period of sede vacante. In this case, the particular church is the Diocese of Rome and the "vacant seat" is the cathedra of Saint John Lateran, the cathedral church of the Bishop of Rome.

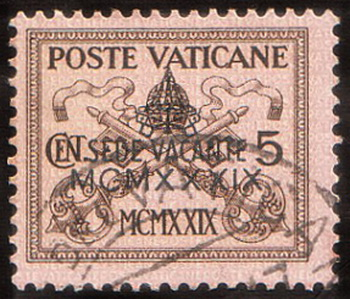
Sede vacante stamp of 1939.

According to Universi Dominici gregis, the government of the Holy See and the administration of the Catholic Church during sede vacante fall to the College of Cardinals, but in a very limited capacity. At the same time, all the heads of the departments of the Roman Curia "cease to exercise" their offices. The exceptions are the Cardinal Camerlengo, who is charged with managing the properties of the Holy See, and the Major Penitentiary, who continues to exercise his normal role. If either has to do something which normally requires the assent of the pope, he has to submit it to the College of Cardinals. Papal legates continue to exercise their diplomatic roles and both the Vicar General of Rome and the Vicar General for the Vatican City State continue to exercise their pastoral roles during this period. The postal administration of the Vatican City State prepares and issues special postage stamps for use during this particular period, known as "sede vacante stamps".

The coat of arms of the Holy See also changes during this period. The papal tiara over the keys is replaced with the umbraculum, or ombrellino in Italian. This symbolizes both the lack of a pope and the governance of the camerlengo over the temporalities of the Holy See. The camerlengo also ornaments his arms with this symbol during this period, which he removes once a pope is elected. Previously during this period, the arms of the camerlengo appeared on commemorative Vatican lira coinage. It now makes its appearance on Vatican euro coins, which are legal tender in all Eurozone states.

The interregnum is highlighted by the funeral Mass of the deceased pope and the general congregations of the College of Cardinals for determining the particulars of the election, and finally culminating in the papal conclave to elect a successor. Once a new pope has been elected, and ordained bishop if necessary, the sede vacante period ends, even before the papal inauguration.

Cardinals present in Rome may wait a maximum of fifteen days after the start of the vacancy before they hold the conclave to elect the new pope, although this period may be extended by five days by a vote of the college. After twenty days have passed, they must hold the conclave, even if some cardinals are not present. The period from the death of the pope to the start of the conclave was often shorter, but after Cardinal William O'Connell arrived too late for two conclaves in a row, Pope Pius XI extended the time limit. With the next conclave in 1939, cardinals began to travel by air. Days before his resignation in February 2013, Pope Benedict XVI amended the rules to allow the cardinals to begin the conclave sooner if all voting cardinals are present. Sede vacante periods may be months or years long due to deadlocked conclaves, but are less than a month long most of the time.

The longest period without a pope in the last 250 years was the approximately half-year from the death in prison of Pius VI in 1799 and the election of Pius VII in Venice in 1800.

=== Extended sede vacante periods ===
Conclaves and papal elections are generally completed in short order, but there have been several periods when the papacy has been vacant for months or even years.

The following table details sede vacante periods in excess of a year:

Preceding Pope	Subsequent Pope	Beginning	Ending	Duration
Celestine IV	Innocent IV	10 November 1241	25 June 1243	1 year 7 months
Clement IV	Gregory X	29 November 1268	1 September 1271	2 years 10 months
Nicholas IV	Celestine V	4 April 1292	5 July 1294	2 years 3 months
Clement V	John XXII	20 April 1314	2 August 1316	2 years 3 months
Gregory XII	Martin V	4 July 1415	11 November 1417	2 years 5 months

=== Sede vacante periods since 1799 ===
Preceding Pope	Subsequent Pope	Beginning	Ending	Duration
Pius VI	Pius VII	29 August 1799	14 March 1800	197 days
Pius VII	Leo XII	20 August 1823	28 September 1823	39 days
Leo XII	Pius VIII	10 February 1829	31 March 1829	49 days
Pius VIII	Gregory XVI	30 November 1830	2 February 1831	63 days
Gregory XVI	Pius IX	1 June 1846	16 June 1846	15 days
Pius IX	Leo XIII	7 February 1878	20 February 1878	13 days
Leo XIII	Pius X	20 July 1903	4 August 1903	15 days
Pius X	Benedict XV	20 August 1914	3 September 1914	14 days
Benedict XV	Pius XI	22 January 1922	6 February 1922	15 days
Pius XI	Pius XII	10 February 1939	2 March 1939	20 days
Pius XII	John XXIII	9 October 1958	28 October 1958	19 days
John XXIII	Paul VI	3 June 1963	21 June 1963	18 days
Paul VI	John Paul I	6 August 1978	26 August 1978	20 days
John Paul I	John Paul II	28 September 1978	16 October 1978	18 days
John Paul II	Benedict XVI	2 April 2005	19 April 2005	17 days
Benedict XVI	Francis	28 February 2013	13 March 2013	13 days
Francis	Leo XIV	21 April 2025	8 May 2025	17 days

== Catholic dioceses and archdioceses ==
The term sede vacante can be applied to Catholic dioceses, archdioceses, and eparchies other than the Papacy when a bishop or archbishop has died, resigned, been transferred, or lost his office. If there is a coadjutor bishop for the diocese, the coadjutor bishop immediately succeeds to the episcopal see and no period of sede vacante occurs.

Within eight days after the see is known to be vacant, the college of consultors (or the cathedral chapter in some countries) is obliged to elect a diocesan or archdiocesan administrator. The administrator they choose must be a priest or bishop who is at least 35 years old.

If the college of consultors fails to elect a qualifying person within the time allotted, the choice of an administrator passes to the metropolitan archbishop or, if the metropolitan see is vacant, to the senior-most suffragan bishop by appointment. The pope can also decide to name an administrator directly; in this case the role is apostolic administrator. If the apostolic administrator is a diocesan bishop or archbishop of a diocese or archdiocese, he temporarily governs the vacant diocese as well as his own. The administrator has powers similar to those of a bishop or archbishop, except for matters excepted by the nature of the matter or expressly by law. Canon law subjects his activity to various legal restrictions and to special supervision by the college of consultors (as for example canons 272 and 485).

Until an administrator is in place, the governance of the see is entrusted, with the powers of a vicar general, to the (senior) auxiliary bishop, if there is one, or otherwise to the college of consultors as a whole.

Vicars general and episcopal vicars who serve as a bishop's deputy lose their ability to exercise the bishop's executive powers during sede vacante; a vicar general who is himself a bishop retains the powers of his own office, to exercise under the authority of the administrator. However, vicar generals retain the duties and responsibilities of the office during sede vacante, serving alongside the diocesan or apostolic administrator to maintain continuity until the succeeding bishop is installed or assumes office on a diocese.

The coat of arms of the departing bishop or archbishop may continue to be used during sede vacante while awaiting the installation of a successor. Once a successor is installed and the sede vacante period ends, the diocese will begin using the new bishop's arms.

While an episcopal seat is sede vacante, churches in the diocese will skip the usual mention of the local bishop in the Eucharistic Prayer of the Mass: after mentioning the Pope, the celebrant will either immediately say "and all the clergy", or refer to all bishops as "the Order of Bishops." If the administrator overseeing the sede vacante period is a bishop, however, his name may be mentioned ("our Administrator", or simply as "our Bishop") as if the diocese has a prelate installed in office.

The administrator may not sit on the cathedra – the vacant seat itself – even if he is himself a bishop or archbishop, as he is not the bishop of the vacant see. He may only use a chair reserved for the main celebrant of a Mass.

== Other uses ==
The term has been adopted in sedevacantism, an extreme position within Catholic traditionalist movement. Sedevacantists believe that all popes since the Second Vatican Council have been heretics, and that therefore the see of Rome is vacant.

The term sede vacante is also used in the Anglican Communion, including in the canon law of the Church of England. When a diocesan see is vacant, its temporalities vest in the Crown as guardian, including the bishop's right of patronage to benefices. The exercise of this is termed the Crown's sede vacante patronage. It is also used in other contexts where there is a vacancy in a see.

== See also ==
- Glossary of the Catholic Church
- Index of Catholic Church articles
