= Mario Mattei =

Italian cardinal

His Eminence Mario Mattei
- Dean of the College of Cardinals
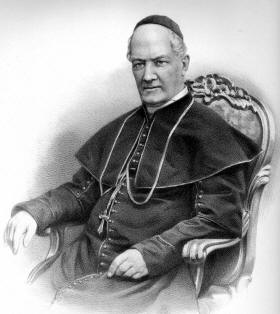
- Church: Roman Catholic Church
- Appointed: 30 September 1860
- Term ended: 7 October 1870
- Predecessor: Vincenzo Macchi
- Successor: Costantino Patrizi Naro
- Other posts: President of the Congregation of the Reverend Basilica of Saint Peter (1843–70); Archpriest of Saint Peter's Basilica (1843–70); Pro-Datary of the Apostolic Dataria (1858–70); Cardinal-Bishop of Ostia-Velletri (1860–70)
- Previous posts: Cardinal-Deacon of Santa Maria in Aquiro (1832–42); Camerlengo of the College of Cardinals (1834–35; 1848–50); Cardinal-Priest of Santa Maria degli Angeli (1842–44); Cardinal-Bishop of Frascati (1844–54); Cardinal-Bishop of Porto e Santa Rufina (1854–60); Prefect of the Apostolic Signatura (1854–58)

Orders
- Ordination: c. 1817
- Consecration: 23 June 1844 by Vincenzo Macchi
- Created cardinal: 2 July 1832 by Pope Gregory XVI
- Rank: Cardinal-Deacon (1832–42); Cardinal-Priest (1842–44); Cardinal-Bishop (1844–70)

Personal details
- Born: Mario Mattei; 6 September 1792 Pergola, Marche
- Died: 7 October 1870 (aged 78) Rome, Kingdom of Italy
- Buried: Saint Peter's Basilica
- Parents: Marco Mattei; Francesca Orsini Bianchi
- Education: Pontifical Academy of Ecclesiastical Nobles; La Sapienza University
- Coat of arms

Mario Mattei (6 September 1792, Pergola, Marche – 7 October 1870) was an Italian Cardinal, of the Roman noble House of Mattei. He became Dean of the College of Cardinals in 1860.

== Personal life ==
Mario Mattei was born on 6 September 1792 in Pergola, Marche.

He was educated at the Collegio Ghislieri, a Roman college, and at the La Sapienza University where he received a doctorate in utroque iure) and later attended the Pontifical Academy of Ecclesiastical Nobles in 1810. Around 1817, he was ordained a priest.

== Cardinal ==
He was elevated to Cardinal by Pope Gregory XVI in 1832 and was subsequently appointed to the following posts:

- 1832 – Cardinal-Deacon of St Maria in Aquiro
- 1842 – Cardinal-Priest of St Maria degli Angeli
- 1844 – Bishop of Frascati
- 1854 – Bishop of Porto e Santa Rufina
- 1860 – Bishop of Ostia and Dean of the Sacred College of Cardinals

== Vatican service ==
In 1843, Mattei was appointed as Arch-Priest of St. Peter's Basilica and held this position until his death in 1870.

Records indicate that Mattei was appointed Camerlengo of the Sacred College of Cardinals twice; between 1834 and 1835 and between 1848 and 1850 and he was also appointed to be the Dean of the College of Cardinals in 1860. He was a participant in the First Vatican Council between 1869 and 1870 and in the Papal Conclave of 1846 that elected Pope Pius IX.

Catholic Church titles
Preceded by Ludovico Micara	Cardinal-Bishop of Frascati; 17 June 1844 – 23 June 1854	Succeeded by Antonio Maria Cagiano de Azevedo
Preceded by Luigi Lambruschini	Cardinal-Bishop of Porto e Santa Rufina; 23 June 1854 – 17 December 1860	Succeeded by Giuseppe Milesi Pironi Ferretti
Preceded by Vincenzo Macchi	Cardinal-Bishop of Osta e Velletri and Dean of the College of Cardinals; 17 December 1860 – 7 October 1870	Succeeded by Costantino Patrizi Naro
Preceded by Giacomo Giustiniani	Arch-Priest of St. Peter's Basilica; 11 March 1843 – 7 October 1870	Succeeded by Niccola Paracciani Clarelli
Preceded by Ludovico Gazzoli	Camerlengo of the Sacred College of Cardinals; 20 January 1834 – 6 April 1835 (1st Term)	Succeeded by Nicola Grimaldi
Preceded by Castruccio Castracane degli Antelminelli	Camerlengo of the Sacred College of Cardinals; 1848–1850 (2nd Term)	Succeeded by Giacomo Luigi Brignole
