= Vincenzo Macchi =

Italian cardinal

His Eminence Vincenzo Macchi
- Dean of the College of Cardinals
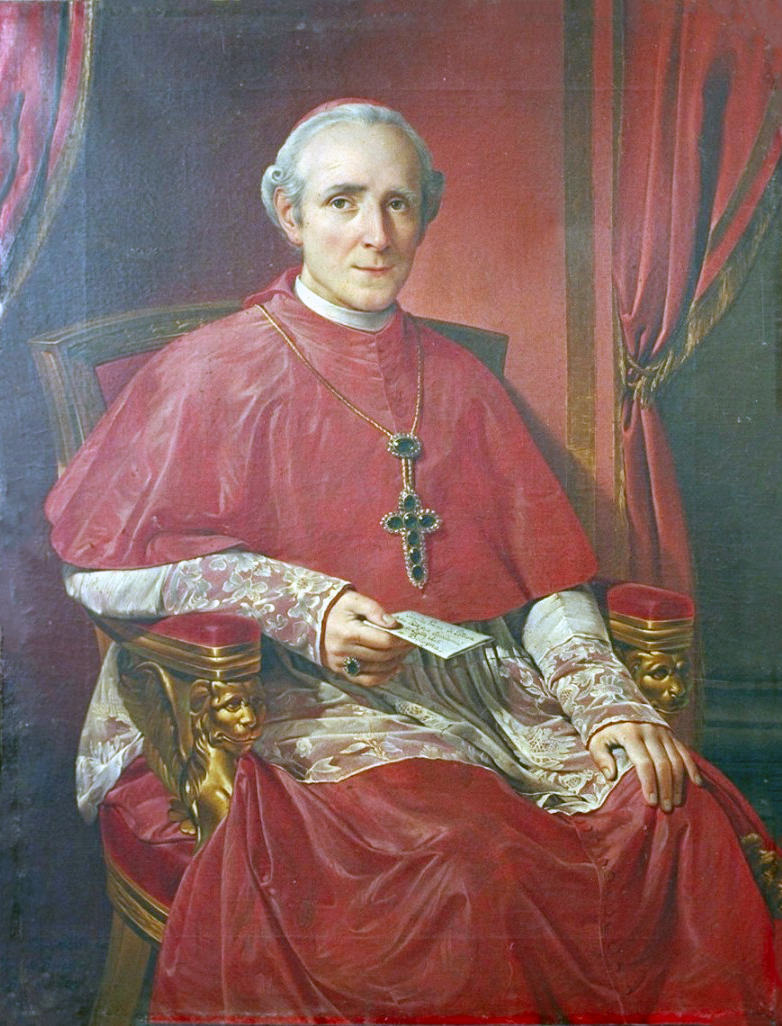
- Portrait.
- Church: Roman Catholic Church
- Appointed: 11 June 1847
- Term ended: 30 September 1860
- Predecessor: Ludovico Micara
- Successor: Mario Mattei
- Other posts: Secretary of the Commission of Roman and Universal Inquisition (1844–60); Cardinal-Bishop of Ostia-Velletri (1847–60)
- Previous posts: Titular Archbishop of Nisibis (1818–26); Cardinal-Priest of Santi Giovanni e Paolo (1827–40); Prefect of the Congregation of the Council (1834–40); Cardinal-Bishop of Palestrina (1840–44); Pro-Prefect of the Apostolic Signatura (1841–44); Camerlengo of the College of Cardinals (1843–44); Cardinal-Bishop of Porto e Santa Rufina (1844–47); Vice-Dean of the College of Cardinals (1844–47)

Orders
- Ordination: 20 September 1794
- Consecration: 4 October 1818 by Lorenzo Litta
- Created cardinal: 2 October 1826 by Pope Leo XII
- Rank: Cardinal-Priest (1827–40); Cardinal-Bishop (1840–60)

Personal details
- Born: Vincenzo Macchi; 30 August 1770 Capo di Monte, Montefiascone, Papal States
- Died: 30 September 1860 (aged 90) Rome, Papal States
- Buried: Santi Giovanni e Paolo al Celio
- Parents: Giovan Nicola Macchi; Maria Anna Gilda Vagni
- Education: La Sapienza University
- Coat of arms

Vincenzo Macchi (30 August 1770 – 30 September 1860) was an Italian Cardinal.

== Career ==
Born on 30 August 1770 in Capodimonte in the Papal States, he studied in Montefiascone and in Rome and was ordained a priest in 1794. In 1801 he gained his doctorate in utroque iure and was posted to the papal Nunciature in Lisbon, where he was active in the years 1801-1816, the years in which Wellington was organizing and leading the Peninsular Campaign. In 1818 he was appointed Archbishop of Nisibi in partibus and from late 1818 to October 1819 was in Lucerne as Nuncio to the Swiss Confederation. In the years 1819-1826 he was Nuncio in Paris, and was made Cardinal by Pope Leo XII in the consistory of 2 October 1826. In the years 1828-1830 he was Legate in Ravenna and Forlì and in 1836-1841 Legate in Bologna. Although considered a candidate in the Papal conclave of 1830-1, his backing was insufficient, despite the support of Giuseppe Albani. He never received more than twelve votes.

Subsequently, Macchi occupied various suburbicarian sees: as Cardinal Bishop of Palestrina in 1840, as Cardinal Bishop of Porto e Santa Rufina in 1844, and, as Dean of the College of Cardinals, was also Cardinal Bishop of Ostia from 1847. He likewise occupied in the last three decades of his life various posts in the Roman Curia.

He died in Rome on 30 September 1860, aged 90. His tomb is in the Roman Basilica of Ss. John and Paul, on the Coelian Hill, at the time of his death he was the last surviving cardinal elevated by Pope Leo XII.

== Sources ==
- Philippe Boutry, Souverain et Pontife: recherches prosopographiques sur la curie romaine à l'âge de la restauration, 1814-1846, Ecole française de Rome, Rome, 2002, pp. 409–410.
- Giuseppe De Marchi, Le nunziature apostoliche dal 1800 al 1956, Edizioni di Storia e letteratura, Roma, 1957, pp. 125–126, 211 and 244;
- Urban Fink, Die Luzerner Nuntiatur 1586-1873: Zur Behördengeschichte und Quellenkunde der päpstlichen Diplomatie in der Schweiz, Rex Verlag, Luzern & Stuttgart 1997 (Collectanea Archivi Vaticani 40; Luzerner Historische Veröffentlichungen 32), pp. 186 and 196-197.
- C. Weber, Kardinäle und Prälaten in den letzten Jahrzehnten des Kirchenstaates, 1978, pp. 477–478.

Catholic Church titles
Preceded by Carlo Maria Pedicini	Cardinal-Bishop of Palestrina; 14 December 1840 – 22 January 1844	Succeeded by Castruccio Castracane degli Anteliminelli
Preceded by Carlo Maria Pedicini	Cardinal-Bishop of Porto e Santa Rufina; 22 January 1844 – 11 June 1847	Succeeded by Luigi Lambruschini
Preceded by Lodovico Micara	Cardinal-Bishop of Osta e Velletri and Dean of the College of Cardinals; 11 June 1847 – 30 September 1860	Succeeded by Mario Mattei
