= Giuseppe Albani =

Roman Catholic Cardinal (1750–1834)

His Eminence Giuseppe Albani
- Cardinal Secretary of State
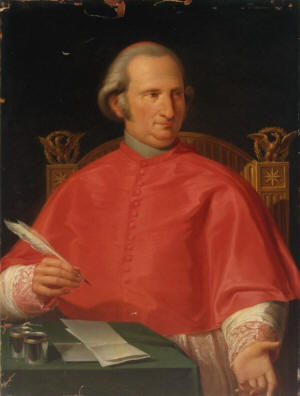
- Church: Roman Catholic Church
- Appointed: 31 March 1829
- Term ended: 3 December 1834
- Predecessor: Giulio Maria della Somaglia
- Successor: Tommaso Bernetti
- Other posts: Protodeacon (1827-34); Cardinal-Deacon of Santa Maria in Via Lata (1828-34); Archivist of the Vatican Secret Archives (1830-34); Librarian of the Vatican Apostolic Library (1830-34)
- Previous posts: Cardinal-Deacon of San Cesareo in Palatio (1804-18); Prefect of the Congregation of Bishops and Regulars (1817-24); Prefect of the Congregation of Good Government (1817-24); Cardinal-Deacon of Sant'Eustachio (1818-28); Camerlengo of the College of Cardinals (1821-22)

Orders
- Created cardinal: 23 February 1801 by Pope Pius VII
- Rank: Cardinal-Deacon (1804-34)

Personal details
- Born: Giuseppe Andrea Albani; 13 September 1750 Rome, Papal States
- Died: 3 December 1834 (aged 84) Pesaro, Papal States
- Parents: Orazio Albani; Maria Anna Matilde Cybo Malaspina
- Coat of arms

Styles of Giuseppe Albani
- Reference style: His Eminence
- Spoken style: Your Eminence
- Informal style: Cardinal

Giuseppe (Andrea) Albani (13 September 1750 – 3 December 1834) was an Italian Roman Catholic Cardinal. He played an important role in the elections of Leo XII, Pius VIII and Gregory XVI.

== Biography ==
Albani was born in Rome into a noble family, who produced a number of clergy. His great-uncle was Pope Clement XI (r. 1700–1720) and three other relatives were prominent cardinals: two nephews of Pope Clement, Annibale Albani (1682–1751) and Alessandro Albani (1692–1772), and Alessandro's nephew Gianfrancesco Albani (1720–1803), who was Giuseppe's uncle.

He studied for the priesthood in Siena, but in his early twenties he returned to Rome to be a domestic prelate for Pope Clement XIV. He gained experience in the practice of canon law. He held major offices in the Roman Curia from a relatively early age. During the French occupation of Rome at the end of the 18th century, he took refuge in Vienna, where he became allied with the Habsburg monarchy. The Habsburgs claimed the right to exercise over papal election, the jus exclusivae, and he served as their intermediary in subsequent papal conclaves when they chose to exercise that right.

The French invaders had removed many works of art from the Villa Albani, which had been built for Alessandro Albani, who filled it with his collection of antiquities and ancient Roman sculpture. In 1815, Giuseppe Albani reclaimed them but sold them rather than pay the costs of transporting them to Rome. Some remained in Paris and several entered the collection of Ludwig I of Bavaria.

On 20 May 1817, he was appointed Prefect of the Congregation for Bishops and Pius VII made him a cardinal in 1818, assigning him the titular church of San Cesareo in Palatio.

In the conclave of 1823, he presented the veto against the election of Cardinal Antonio Gabriele Severoli on behalf of Emperor Francis I of Austria. In the 1829 conclave, though Albani was absent from the early ballots, his support for Pius VIII proved significant. In the conclave of 1830, Albani played a significant role but did not see his candidate Bartolomeo Pacca succeed.

As Cardinal Protodeacon, he announced the elections of Pope Pius VIII in 1829 and Pope Gregory XVI in 1830 and crowned both with the triple tiara.

Albani's other appointments included Secretary of Secret Domestic Briefs on 30 January 1824, as Legate in Bologna on 10 December 1824, Secretary of State to Pius VIII from 31 March 1829 until 30 November 1830, and as Secretary of Apostolic Briefs from 15 April 1829 until his death. He was also Librarian of Holy Roman Church beginning on 23 April 1830. In 1831, he was also appointed Legate in Urbino and Pesaro, and was the commissary extraordinary charged with reestablishing order in the Legations of the Papal States. He was one of Pope Gregory's advisors responsible for assessing the flood risk posed by the River Aniene to the east of Rome.

He died in Pesaro on 3 December 1834. He was buried in the family chapel in the cloisters of the Church of San Pietro in Urbino.

== Sources ==
- Philippe Boutry, Souverain et Pontife: recherches prosopographiques sur la curie romaine à l'âge de la restauration, 1814–1846, École française de Rome, Rome, 2002, pp. 301–302.

Catholic Church titles
| Preceded by Tommaso Bernetti (Pro-Secretary) | Cardinal Secretary of State; 31 March 1829 – 30 November 1830 | Succeeded by Tommaso Bernetti |
