= Jus exclusivae =

Veto by monarchs in papal elections

Jus exclusivae (Latin for "right of exclusion"; sometimes called the papal veto) was the right claimed by several Catholic monarchs of Europe to veto a candidate for the papacy. Although never formally recognized by the Catholic Church, the monarchs of France, Spain and Austria claimed this right at various times, making known to a papal conclave, through a crown-cardinal, that the monarch deemed a particular candidate for the papacy objectionable.

== Early history ==
The right exercised by Byzantine (Byzantine Papacy) and Holy Roman emperors to confirm the election of a pope, which was last exercised in the Early Middle Ages, appears unrelated to the early modern legal claim of jus exclusivae by the Holy Roman Empire, France, and Spain. Pope Pius IV, in his bull In Eligendis (1562), excluded formal support of the Church to such rights and external interventions in the conclave. It was explicitly forbidden in 1904 with the bull Commissum Nobis of Pope Pius X.

In the 17th century, treatises in defence of this right first appear. It was notably invoked in 1644 by both Spain and France. Spain used it to exclude the election of Giulio Cesare Sacchetti, whereas France failed to veto the election of Giovanni Battista Pamphili (who became Pope Innocent X).

== Right asserted since 1644 ==
- 1644 Papal conclave – Giulio Cesare Sacchetti, by King Philip IV of Spain
- 1655 Papal conclave – Giulio Cesare Sacchetti, by King Philip IV of Spain
- 1669–70 Papal conclave – Benedetto Odescalchi, by King Louis XIV of France (Note: Cardinal Odeschalchi was elected pope in 1676, taking the name Innocent XI.)
- 1700 Papal conclave – Galeazzo Marescotti, by King Louis XIV of France
- 1721 Papal conclave – Fabrizio Paolucci, by Emperor Charles VI; and Francesco Pignatelli by King Philip V of Spain
- 1730 Papal conclave – Giuseppe Renato Imperiali, by King Philip V of Spain
- 1758 Papal conclave – Carlo Alberto Guidoboni Cavalchini, by King Louis XV of France
- 1774–75 Papal conclave - Giovanni Carlo Boschi, by the Bourbon courts
- 1823 Papal conclave – Antonio Gabriele Severoli by Emperor Francis I of Austria
- 1830–31 Papal conclave – Giacomo Giustiniani, by King Ferdinand VII of Spain
- 1903 Papal conclave – Mariano Rampolla, by Emperor Franz Joseph I of Austria

At the 1846 Papal conclave, Austrian Chancellor Klemens von Metternich confided Austria's veto of Cardinal Giovanni Maria Mastai-Ferretti to Cardinal Carlo Gaetano Gaisruck, Archbishop of Milan, who arrived too late. (Note: Salvador Miranda writes that Eugenio Cazzani calls the report that Gaisruck was bringing the Austrian Emperor's veto of Mastai-Ferretti an unverified rumor.) Mastai-Ferretti would reign as Pius IX for over thirty-one years.

== Papal attitude toward the jus exclusivae ==
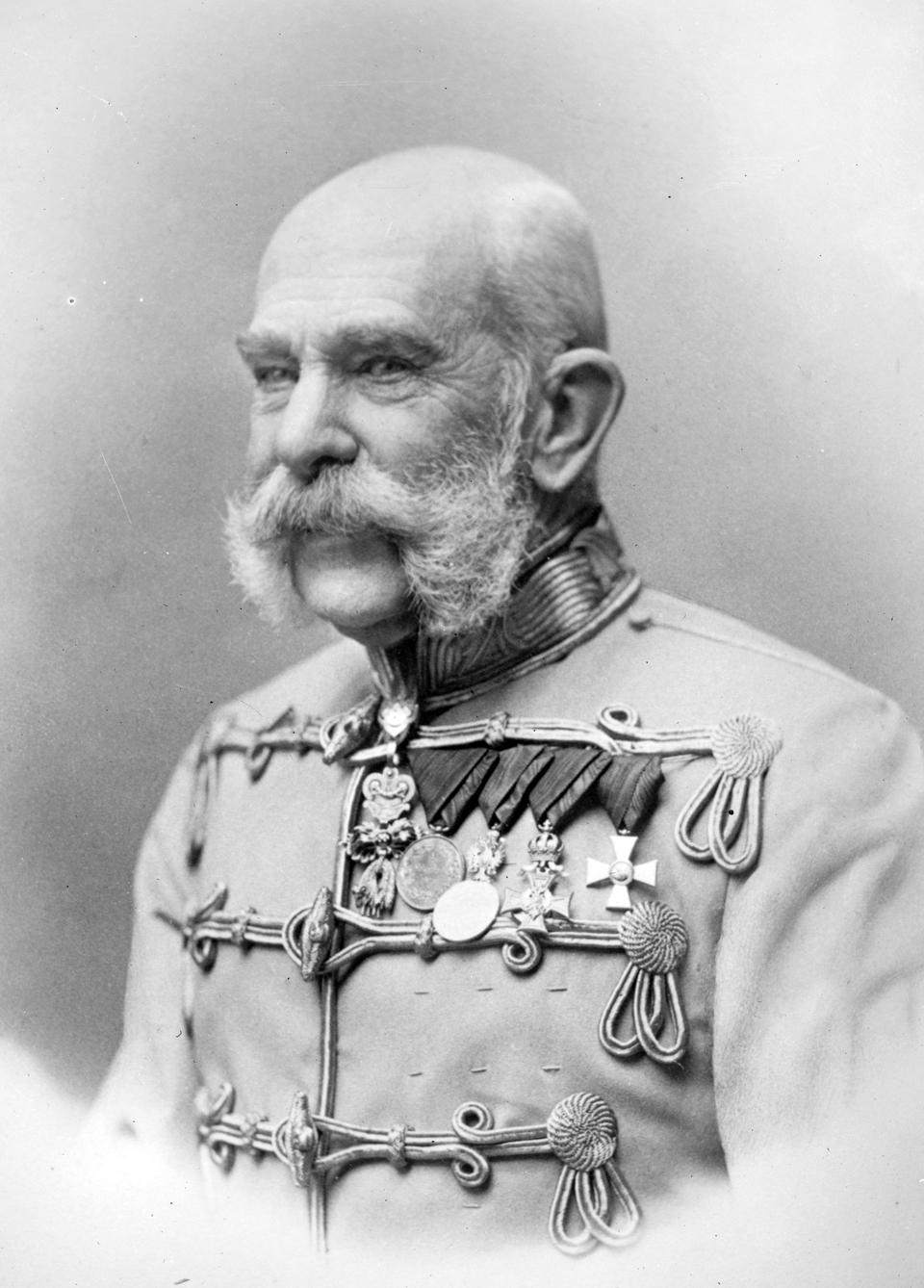
Franz Joseph I of Austria was the last monarch to attempt to exercise the jus exclusivae.

The right has never been formally recognized by the papacy, though conclaves have considered it expedient to recognize secular objections to certain candidates for the papacy (papabili), and to accept secular interference as an unavoidable abuse. By the papal bull In eligendis of 9 October 1562 Pope Pius IV ordered the cardinals to elect a pope without deference to any secular power. The bull Aeterni Patris Filius by Pope Gregory XV (15 November 1621) forbids cardinals to conspire to exclude any candidate. These pronouncements however, did not specifically condemn the jus exclusivae. In the apostolic constitution In hac sublimi of 23 August 1871 Pope Pius IX forbade any kind of secular interference in papal elections.

The most recent attempt to exercise the right to exclude Cardinal Rampolla in 1903 was rejected by the conclave, although over the course of several ballots Rampolla, who had been the leading candidate, lost support until the conclave elected Cardinal Sarto, Pius X. The following year, Pius X forbade the jus exclusivae in the apostolic constitution Commissum Nobis of 20 January 1904:

Wherefore in virtue of holy obedience, under threat of the Divine judgment, and pain of excommunication latae sententiae… we prohibit the cardinals of the Holy Roman Church, all and single, and likewise the Secretary of the Sacred College of Cardinals, and all others who take part in the conclave, to receive even under the form of a simple desire the office of proposing the veto in whatever manner, either by writing or by word of mouth… And it is our will that this prohibition be extended… to all intercessions, etc… by which the lay powers endeavour to intrude themselves in the election of a pontiff… Let no man infringe this our inhibition… under pain of incurring the indignation of God Almighty and of his Apostles, Sts. Peter and Paul.

Since then the cardinals in conclave have been enjoined to take this oath: "We shall never in any way accept, under any pretext, from any civil power whatever, the office of proposing a veto of exclusion even under the form of a mere desire… and we shall never lend favour to any intervention, or intercession, or any other method whatever, by which the lay powers of any grade or order may wish to interfere in the election of a pontiff."

No power has openly attempted to exercise the right since 1903. France had become a republic in 1870. After World War I, the German Empire and Austria-Hungary were dissolved. Spain became a republic and eventually a constitutional monarchy. During the 1963 conclave, Generalissimo Francisco Franco made an unsuccessful attempt to block the election of Cardinal Giovanni Battista Montini. He sent the College of Cardinals some "advice" through Cardinal Arcadio Larraona, a native of Spain who was then the Prefect of the Congregation of Rites. It was carefully drafted to fall outside the forms of influence that Pius X had prohibited, but the cardinals nevertheless thought it outrageous. (Note: Just after the conclave ended, The New York Times reported: "A report before the beginning of the conclave that Generalissimo Francisco Franco had asked the six Spanish cardinals to prevent Cardinal Montini's elevation was emphatically denied. The Spanish press had criticized [Montini] last October after he had publicly interceded with [Franco] for political prisoners.")

== See also ==
- Investiture Controversy
- Papal appointment
- Papal deposing power
