= Papabile =

Catholic cardinals likely to become pope

Papabile (/pəˈpɑːbɪleɪ/ pə-PAH-bil-ay, UK also /-li/ -ee, Italian: [paˈpaːbile]; plural: papabili; lit. 'pope-able' or 'able to be pope') is an Italian word neologised in the fifteenth century at least, used internationally in many languages to describe a Catholic man—in practice, always a cardinal—who is thought of as a likely or possible candidate to be elected pope by the College of Cardinals. The term has been popularised by Vaticanologists.

In some cases, cardinals who were considered papabile were elected pope. Among them are Eugenio Pacelli (Pius XII) in 1939, Giovanni Battista Montini (Paul VI) in 1963, Joseph Ratzinger (Benedict XVI) in 2005, and Jorge Mario Bergoglio (Francis) in 2013.

At times, however, the college have elected candidates not considered papabile by most Vatican watchers. In recent years, these have included Angelo Roncalli (John XXIII) in 1958, Albino Luciani (John Paul I) in August 1978, Karol Wojtyła (John Paul II) in October 1978, and Robert Francis Prevost in 2025. From this is derived a famous proverb: "He who enters the conclave as pope, leaves it as a cardinal".

The list of papabili changes as cardinals age. For instance, Carlo Maria Martini was thought to be papabile until he retired from his see upon reaching 75 years of age in 2002.

== Terminology ==
The term papabile is at least as old as the fifteenth century, since it is found in the Catholicon Anglicum.

In Italian, the word papabile is also used in non-ecclesiastical contexts, particularly as slang. This includes usage in reference to short list candidates, i.e. those who, among the available candidates, are most likely to get elected or appointed to a specific position.

== Papabili elected pope ==
- Francesco Castiglioni (elected as Pius VIII in 1829) was papabile at both the 1823 conclave and at the 1829 conclave. During his lifetime, Pope Pius VII referred to Castiglioni as "Pope Pius VIII". At the 1823 conclave, Cardinal Annibale della Genga (ultimately elected as Pope Leo XII at this conclave) stated that Castiglioni would someday be "Pope Pius VIII". Castiglioni came close to being elected at said conclave, but lost support due to being identified as being close to Ercole Consalvi, a moderate and Secretary of State of the late Pope Pius VII. Consalvi later died during Leo XII's pontificate and Castiglioni, a papabile once more when Leo XII himself died, was subsequently elected pope at the 1829 conclave. His election was facilitated in that of the other papabili, Bartolomeo Pacca was opposed by France while Emmanuele de Gregorio failed to get the support of the majority of the other cardinals. Upon his election, Castiglioni indeed took the name of Pius VIII, given that his two immediate predecessors had previously called him by that name.
- Gioacchino Pecci (elected as Leo XIII in 1878). The majority of the cardinals who headed to Rome for this conclave had already decided to support Pecci who was Camerlengo. Pecci was also perceived to be the opposite of the recently deceased Pius IX.
- Giacomo della Chiesa (elected as Benedict XV in 1914)
- Eugenio Pacelli (elected as Pius XII in 1939). Prior to his death, Pope Pius XI strongly hinted that he favoured Pacelli as his successor. During his final consistory on 15 December 1937, Pius XI strongly hinted to the cardinals that he expected Pacelli to be his successor, saying: "He is in your midst." He had previously been quoted as saying: "When today the Pope dies, you'll get another one tomorrow, because the Church continues. It would be a much bigger tragedy, if Cardinal Pacelli dies, because there is only one. I pray every day, God may send another one into one of our seminaries, but as of today, there is only one in this world."
- Giovanni Montini (elected as Paul VI in 1963). Montini had been discussed as a papabile candidate in the 1958 conclave despite not having been a cardinal at the time; Giuseppe Siri reacted with horror that a non-cardinal would even be considered. It was also rumoured some of the French cardinals voted in favor of Montini during that conclave. John XXIII had sent vague signals during his reign that he believed his friend Montini (whom he made a cardinal) would be his successor.
- Joseph Ratzinger (elected as Benedict XVI in 2005). On 2 January 2005, Time magazine quoted unnamed Vatican sources as saying that Ratzinger (then serving as Prefect for the Congregation for the Doctrine of the Faith) was a front runner to succeed John Paul II should he die or become too ill to continue as pope. Upon the death of John Paul II, the Financial Times gave the odds of Ratzinger becoming pope as 7–1, the lead position but close to his rivals on the liberal wing of the church. In April 2005, before his election as pope, he was identified as one of the 100 most influential people in the world by Time. At the conclave, a sentiment was: "it was, if not Ratzinger, who? And as they came to know him, the question became, why not Ratzinger?" On 19 April 2005, he was elected on the second day after four ballots.
- Jorge Mario Bergoglio (elected as Francis in 2013). Bergoglio was a papabile at the 2005 conclave and was also considered a contender at the 2013 conclave due to his being the reported "second-place finisher" at the 2005 conclave. According to John L. Allen Jr., some of the participants in the 2005 conclave who were also participating in the 2013 conclave were "getting another bite at the apple". Despite this, his election still came as a surprise because some of the commentators who considered him papabile made the observation that there were "compelling reasons to believe that Bergoglio's window of opportunity to be pope has already closed" and that "his 'moment' seems to be over".

== Papabili not elected ==
Being seen as papabile is no guarantee of election, and is sometimes seen as a handicap. (Although the following candidates were widely discussed as candidates publicly, the actual vote results described below are frequently based on rumours and sourced, if at all, from off-the-record reports of individual cardinals.)

- Mariano Rampolla, Leo XIII's Cardinal Secretary of State, was headed for victory in the 1903 conclave, only to be vetoed by Jan Puzyna de Kosielsko, Archbishop of Kraków, on behalf of Austro-Hungarian Emperor Franz Joseph I. With Rampolla blocked, Giuseppe Sarto was elected and became Pius X. One of Pius X's first acts was to abolish the rights of Catholic monarchs to veto. (Note: Papal historian Valérie Pirie disagreed with the conclusion that Rampolla would have won but for the veto of the Austro-Hungarian Emperor. Pirie claims that Rampolla would never have prevailed in the conclave and all that the veto accomplished was to make him appear a sympathetic figure as a victim of Austrian hostility.)
- Rafael Merry del Val was a widely considered candidate in the 1914 and 1922 conclaves, which eventually elected Benedict XV and Pius XI respectively, although he never garnered enough votes to be in serious contention.
- Giuseppe Siri was widely expected to be elected pope in the 1958 and 1963 conclaves, and continued to be a prime contender in both 1978 conclaves. On the first of these occasions, Angelo Roncalli, an unexpected choice, was elected and became Pope John XXIII. An unsubstantiated conspiracy theory popular among sedevacantists claims that he was actually elected during the former conclave.
- Giovanni Benelli, Archbishop of Florence and the leading liberal candidate, was widely expected to be elected pope in both the August and October 1978 conclaves; in fact, he was defeated in both (albeit narrowly, the second time). In August, a candidate few saw as papabile, Albino Luciani, was elected, becoming John Paul I – with the support of Benelli himself. In October, another such candidate, Karol Wojtyła, was elected as John Paul II.
- Sergio Pignedoli, a towering figure in the church, was Paul VI's closest confidant and widely expected to succeed him. Following the death of Paul VI in 1978, Pignedoli was featured in numerous publications around the world, including on the covers of Time and Newsweek, as a leading contender to be elected pope. In the August 1978 conclave, Pignedoli, the progressive candidate, received nearly half of the votes of the cardinal electors. His main opponent was the conservative cardinal Giuseppe Siri of Genova; however, since both were unable to obtain a majority, a compromise candidate emerged, and Albino Luciani was elected as Pope John Paul I. Thirty three days later, following the sudden death of John Paul I, a second conclave convened in October 1978. Pignedoli was again the leading contender for the papacy, but ultimately Karol Wojtyła was elected as Pope John Paul II.
- Carlo Maria Martini, Archbishop of Milan from 1980 to 2002 and a Jesuit biblical exegete, was considered to be the most likely successor to John Paul II for much of the 1980s and 1990s but was already suffering from Parkinson's disease by the time the 2005 conclave was convened.
- Francis Arinze, Prefect of the Congregation for Divine Worship and the Discipline of the Sacraments and one of John Paul II's principal advisors, was speculated by some media reports as a highly favoured successor to John Paul II but did not garner enough votes in the 2005 conclave.
- Angelo Scola, Archbishop of Milan, was considered such a front-runner in the 2013 conclave that the Episcopal Conference of Italy had already pre-drafted a press release concerning his election. However, his ties to a corruption probe caused his perception by the fellow cardinals to decline drastically.
- Pietro Parolin, Francis's Cardinal Secretary of State, was often considered a moderate option and viable successor, but did not garner enough votes in the 2025 conclave to become pope.
- Luis Antonio Tagle, Archbishop of Manila from 2011 to 2020, dubbed the "Asian Francis" and seen as the representative of the Catholic Church's progressive wing, was speculated in media reports to be a most likely successor to Francis. However, he failed to garner enough votes to become pope in the 2025 conclave. He was also a papabile in the 2013 papal conclave that elected Francis.
- Pierbattista Pizzaballa, Latin Patriarch of Jerusalem, was considered a potential papabile during the 2025 conclave, due to his potential role as a mediator in midst of the 2024 Gaza War.

== Non-papabili elected pope ==
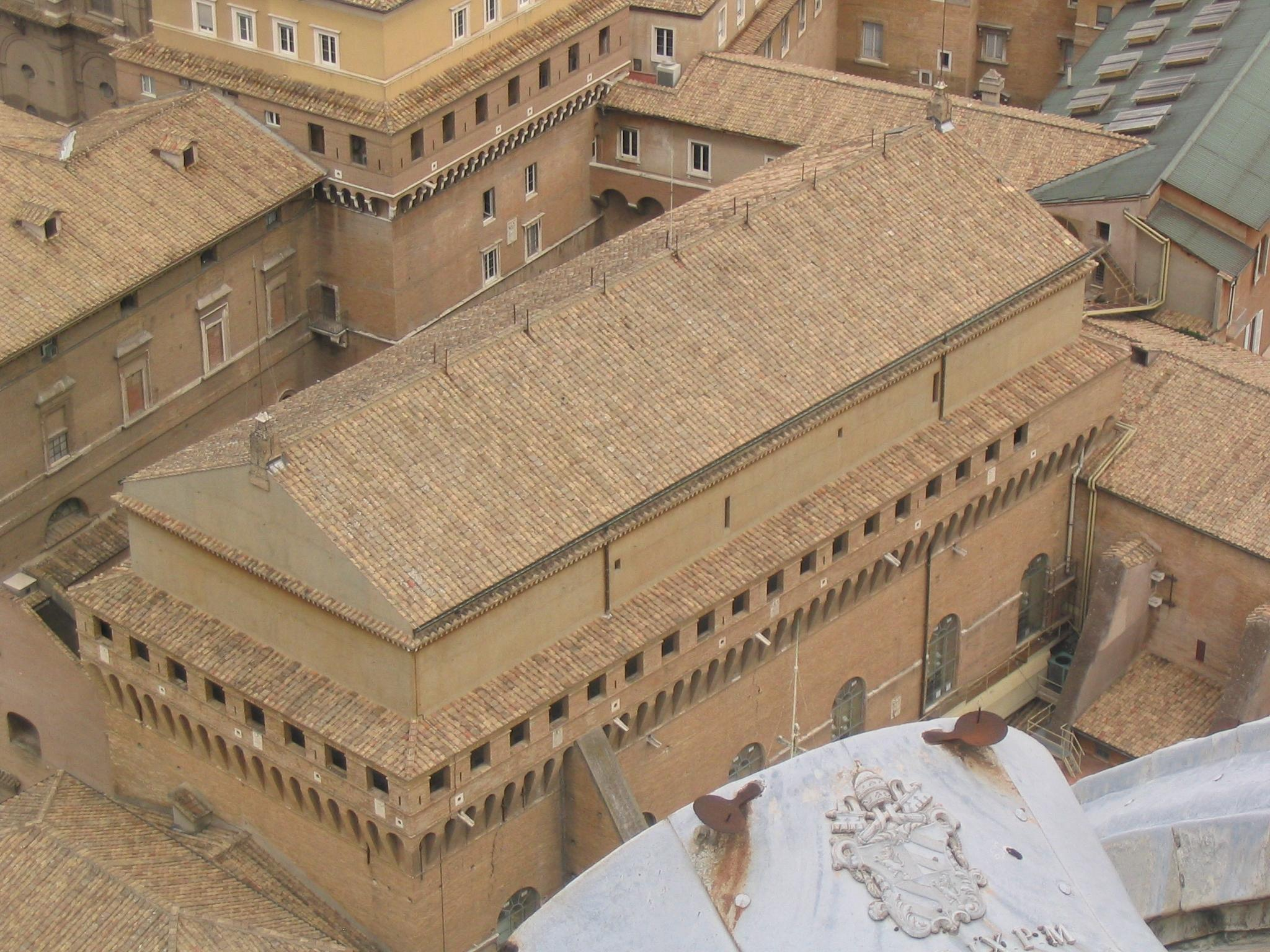
The 1492 conclave was the first to be held in the Sistine Chapel, and has been the site of all conclaves since 1878

- Barnaba Chiaramonti (elected as Pius VII in 1800) was not considered papabile but emerged as an alternative candidate following months of deadlock. Chiaramonti was well-regarded among many of the cardinals, but tried to dissuade them from electing him since he was content with being a bishop. Cardinal Jean-Sifrein Maury first proposed Chiaramonti as a compromise candidate to break the stalemate.
- Annibale della Genga (elected as Leo XII in 1823) was not considered papabile due to his physical infirmities and the cardinal himself at the conclave tried to discourage the other electors from voting for him. However, he was elected because the conclave received information about secret societies who were perceived to have grown in strength during the sede vacante period, and some cardinals wanted a quick conclusion to the conclave; his physical condition made some cardinals think that his pontificate would not last long.
- Bartolomeo Cappellari's (elected as Gregory XVI in 1831) election was unexpected and had been influenced by the fact that the most papabile candidate, Giacomo Giustiniani, had been vetoed, therefore resulting in a deadlock.
- Giuseppe Sarto (elected as Pius X in 1903) emerged as an alternative candidate after the veto of Mariano Rampolla.
- Achille Ratti (elected as Pius XI in 1922) was elected as a compromise candidate between the conservative faction headed by Rafael Merry del Val and the moderate faction headed by Pietro Gasparri. Gasparri also threw his support behind Ratti and urged his supporters to vote for Ratti.
- Angelo Roncalli (elected as John XXIII in 1958). Some commentators like William Doino dispute the contention that Roncalli was a non-papabile and argue that "[b]y the time of Pius XII's death, in 1958, Cardinal Roncalli 'contrary to the idea he came out of nowhere to become pope' was actually one of those favored to be elected. He was well-known, well-liked, and trusted."
- Albino Luciani (elected as John Paul I in 1978). Although Luciani was not considered papabile, one of the papabile cardinals, Giovanni Benelli, used his influence to persuade the others to elect Luciani at the conclave.
- Karol Wojtyła (elected as John Paul II in 1978) was elected as a compromise candidate due to the failure of the leading papabili Giuseppe Siri and Giovanni Benelli to obtain the requisite majority and the only other viable Italian compromise candidate Giovanni Colombo announced to the cardinal-electors at the conclave that he would decline the papacy if elected. Prior to Wojtyła, no non-Italian had been elected Pope since the 1522 conclave that chose the Dutch Pope Adrian VI.
- Robert Francis Prevost (elected as Leo XIV in 2025) was considered a dark horse and a possible compromise candidate. He is the first pontiff coming from North America and the first pope born in the United States.

== See also ==
- Conclave capitulation
- Elective monarchy
- Holy See
- Index of Vatican City-related articles
- List of papal elections
- Papal appointment
- Papal primacy
- Papal conclave
  - 2025 papal conclave
  - 2013 papal conclave
  - 2005 papal conclave
- Papal coronation

== Bibliography ==
=== News articles ===
- Lawler, Phil (11 December 2019). "Who is most likely to succeed Pope Francis?". Catholic Culture. Archived from the original on 3 January 2021.
- Magister, Sandro (11 December 2019). "Conclave Rehearsals. The Next Pope Will Take His Name From Sant'Egidio". Archived from the original on 29 July 2021.
