= Paolo Polidori =

Italian cardinal

His Eminence Paolo Polidori
- Titular Archbishop of Tarsus; Cardinal priest of Sant'Eusebio
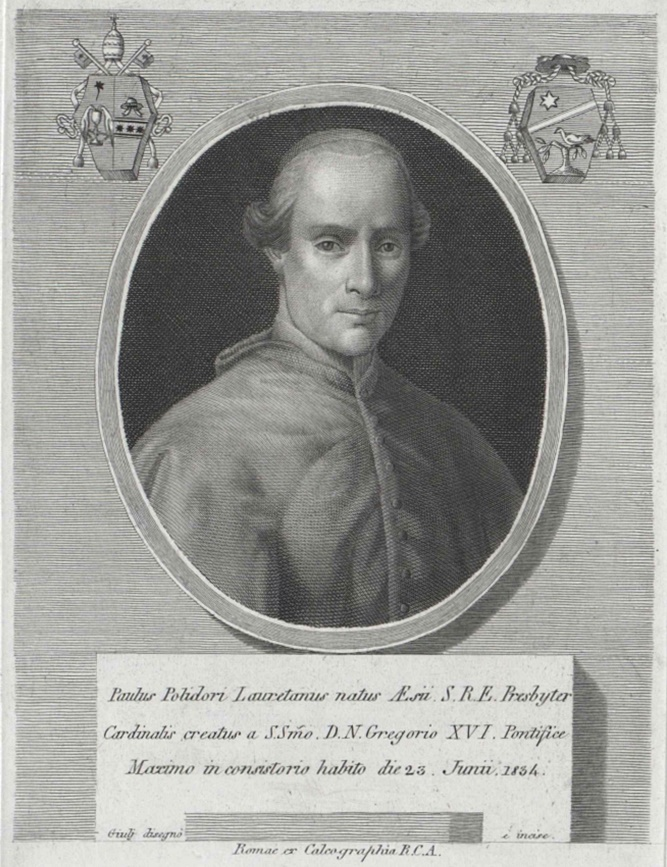
- A painting of Paolo Polidori
- See: Prefect of the Sacred Congregation of the Council
- Installed: September 15, 1841 — April 23, 1847
- Predecessor: Vincenzo Macchi
- Successor: Pietro Ostini
- Other post: Previously Prefect of the Sacred Congregation of the Religious Discipline

Orders
- Created cardinal: June 23, 1834

Personal details
- Born: January 4, 1778 Iesi, Marche, Italy
- Died: April 23, 1847 (aged 69) Rome, Italy

Paolo Polidori (4 January 1778 – 23 April 1847) was an Italian cardinal of the Catholic Church.

== Biography ==
Paolo Polidori was born in Iesi, Marche; where he studied at the seminary of Perugia.

He was ordained as a priest in 1800 and became vicar general of Viterbo and later of the suburbicarian diocese of Ostia. During the French occupation of Rome, he was arrested and exiled from the city until 1814. He continued his career in the Roman Curia as Secretary of the Congregation of the Council. He was appointed Secretary of the papal conclaves of 1829 and 1830-1831.

Polidori was made cardinal priest of Sant'Eusebio in the consistory of 23 June 1834 by Pope Gregory XVI. He was made Prefect of the Congregation of the Regular Discipline on 21 November 1834. He opted for the title of Santa Prassede on 12 July 1841 after the suppression of the Sant'Eusebio title in 1839. He was then appointed Prefect of the Congregation of the Council on 15 September 1841 and held that post until his death.

Polidori was named titular archbishop of Tarsus on 22 January 1844 and received his episcopal consecration on 11 February. He participated in the papal conclave of 1846.

Polidori died on 23 April 1847 in Rome and was buried in the church of Sant'Ignazio in accordance with his will.
