= Quo graviora =

Quo graviora could refer to one of two papal documents:

- Quo graviora (1825) an apostolic constitution issued by Pope Leo XII prohibiting membership in Masonic lodges
- Quo graviora (1833) an encyclical issued by Pope Gregory XVI addressed to the bishops of Rhineland
