= Benincasa (surname) =

Benincasa is an Italian surname. Notable people with the surname include:

- Carmine Benincasa (1947–2020), Italian art critic and art historian professor
- Caterina Benincasa or Catherine of Siena (1347–1380), tertiary of the Dominican Order and a Scholastic philosopher and theologian
- Pius Anthony Benincasa (1913–1986), bishop of the Catholic Church in the United States
- Sara Benincasa (born 1980), American comedian and author

== See also ==
- Benincasa da Montepulciano (1375–1426), Italian Roman Catholic professed religious from the Servite Order
