= Fabrizio Turriozzi =

His Eminence Fabrizio Turriozzi
- Cardinal-Priest of Santa Maria in Ara Coeli
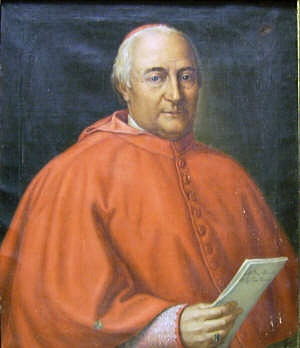
- Church: Roman Catholic Church
- Appointed: 16 May 1823
- Term ended: 9 November 1826
- Predecessor: Giovanni Battista Quarantotti
- Successor: Giacomo Filippo Fransoni

Orders
- Created cardinal: 10 March 1823 by Pope Pius VII
- Rank: Cardinal-Priest

Personal details
- Born: Filippo Turriozzi; 16 November 1755 Toscanella, Bologna, Papal States
- Died: 9 November 1826 (aged 70) Rome, Papal States
- Buried: Santa Maria in Ara Coeli
- Education: La Sapienza University

Styles of Tommaso Pasquale Gizzi
- Reference style: His Eminence
- Spoken style: Your Eminence
- Informal style: Cardinal
- See: Santa Maria in Ara Coeli

Fabrizio Turriozzi (16 November 1755 - 9 November 1826) was an Italian Catholic cardinal.

Born in Toscanella, he was created cardinal by Pope Pius VII at the consistory of 10 March 1823. Made Cardinal of Santa Maria in Aracoeli on 16 May 1823. He participated in the conclave of 1823 that elected Pope Leo XII. He died in Rome in 1826.
