= Emmanuele de Gregorio =

Catholic cardinal

His Eminence Emmanuele de Gregorio
- Major Penitentiary of the Apostolic Penitentiary
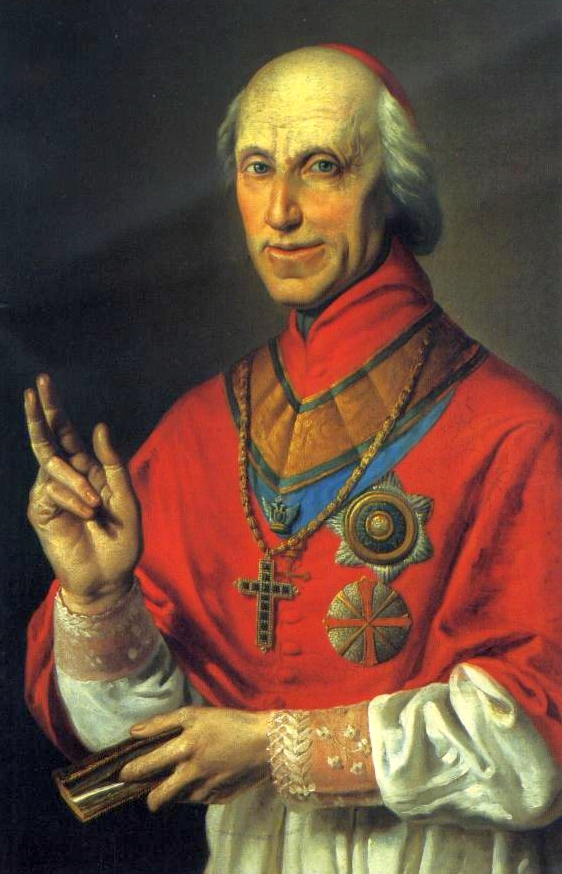
- Church: Roman Catholic Church
- Appointed: 31 May 1829
- Term ended: 7 November 1839
- Predecessor: Francesco Saverio Castiglioni
- Successor: Castruccio Castracane degli Antelminelli
- Other posts: Commendatory Archimandrite of Santissimo Salvatore of the Italo-Albanese (1807–39); Cardinal-Priest of Santi Bonifacio ed Alessio in commendum (1816–39); Cardinal-Bishop of Porto e Santa Rufina (1837–39); Vice-Dean of the College of Cardinals (1837–39); Camerlengo of the College of Cardinals (1838–39)
- Previous posts: Archpriest of Santa Maria Maggiore (1780–1821); Prefect of the Congregation of the Council (1820–34); Cardinal-Bishop of Frascati (1829–37)

Orders
- Consecration: 31 May 1829 by Giulio Maria della Somaglia
- Created cardinal: 8 March 1816 by Pope Pius VII
- Rank: Cardinal-Priest (1816–29); Cardinal-Bishop (1829–39)

Personal details
- Born: Emmanuele de Gregorio; 18 December 1758 at sea en route to Spain
- Died: 7 November 1839 (aged 80) Rome, Papal States
- Buried: San Giuseppe a Capo le Case
- Parents: Leopoldo de Gregorio; María Josefa Verdugo y Quijada

Emmanuele de Gregorio (18 December 1758 – 7 November 1839) was an Italian cardinal of the Roman Catholic Church and son of Leopoldo de Gregorio, Marquis of Esquilache.

== Biography ==
De Gregorio was born at sea while his mother was traveling to Spain. Although he had one other cardinal among his relatives, no other information about his early life survives. However, by age 22 in 1780 he had become archpriest of the patriarchal Lateran basilica and in the following two decades became caught up in the controversy of the French Revolution, being imprisoned in 1798 and kept in captivity between 1811 and 1814. He was deputy vicar of Rome for long periods from 1795 to 1818 as the actual vicar, Cardinal Giulio Maria della Somaglia, was frequently absent. However, it is known that at one point the revolutionary government of France had planned to create him antipope in opposition to Pope Pius VI when the Pontiff condemned the French Revolution in 1791.

In 1816, Pope Pius VII made De Gregorio a cardinal and in the following decade he rose to be one of the most powerful men in the Church. In both the 1829 and 1830 conclaves, he was considered one of the leading papabili but had too many opponents to be elected Pope.

He died in Rome in 1839.
