= Giacomo Giustiniani =

Italian priest, papal diplomat and Cardinal

His Eminence Giacomo Giustiniani
- President of the Congregation of the Reverend Basilica of Saint Peter
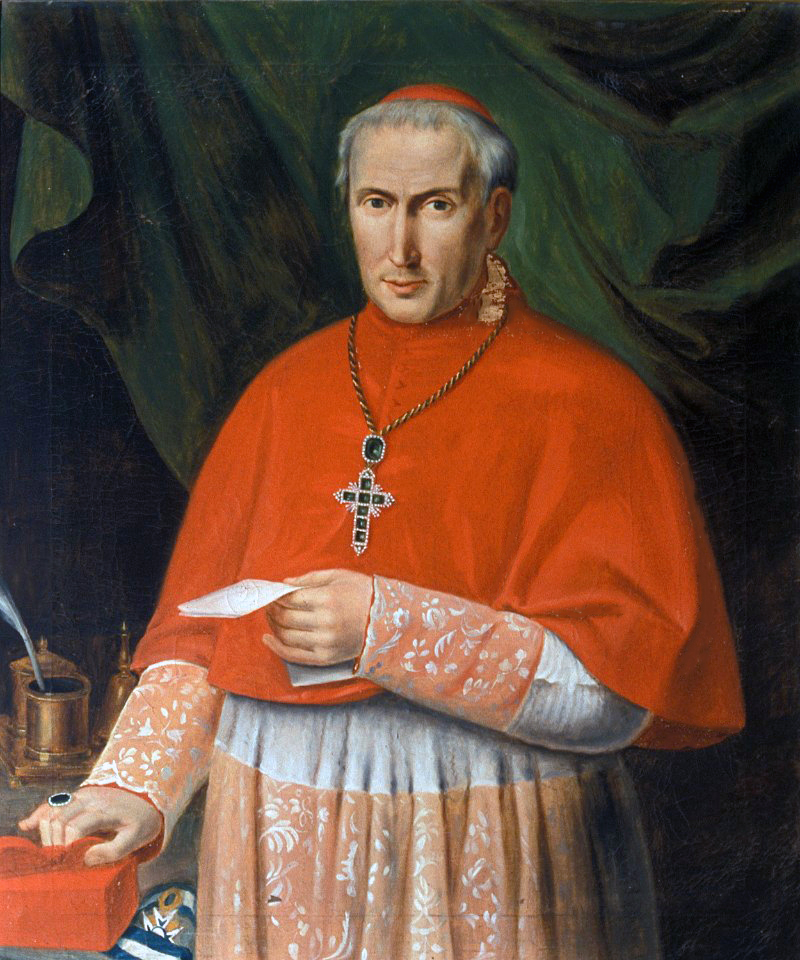
- Church: Catholic Church
- Appointed: 1 July 1837
- Term ended: 24 February 1843
- Predecessor: Pietro Francesco Galleffi
- Successor: Mario Mattei
- Other posts: Titular Archbishop of Tyre (1817–26); Archbishop-Bishop of Imola (1826–32); Cardinal-Priest of Santi Marcellino e Pietro (1827–39); Prefect of the Congregation of the Index (1834–37); Archpriest of Saint Peter's Basilica (1837–43); Camerlengo of the Apostolic Camera (1837–43); Cardinal-Bishop of Albano (1839–43); Camerlengo of the College of Cardinals (1842–43)

Orders
- Ordination: 21 December 1816
- Consecration: 20 April 1817 by Alessandro Mattei
- Created cardinal: 2 October 1826 by Pope Leo XII
- Rank: Cardinal-Priest (1827–39); Cardinal-Bishop (1839–43)

Personal details
- Born: Giacomo Giustiniani; 29 December 1769 Rome, Papal States
- Died: 24 February 1843 (aged 73) Rome, Papal States
- Buried: Santa Maria sopra Minerva
- Parents: Benedetto Giustiniani; Cecilia Carlotta Mahoni
- Education: La Sapienza University

Styles of Giacomo Giustiniani
- Reference style: His Eminence
- Spoken style: Your Eminence
- Informal style: Cardinal
- See: Cardinal bishop of Albano

Giacomo Giustiniani (1769–1843) was an Italian priest, papal diplomat and Cardinal. Considered papabile in the Papal Conclave (1830–31), his election was vetoed by Ferdinand VII of Spain.

He was the younger brother of Vincenzo Giustiniani, 6th Prince Giustiniani, de jure 6th Earl of Newburgh.

His ecclesiastical career and preparation for the priesthood was interrupted by the Napoleonic Wars, and he was ordained in 1816. In 1817 he was papal nuncio in Spain and became titular archbishop of Tyre. He became bishop of Imola in 1826.

He was created Cardinal by Pope Leo XII in 1826. He became bishop of Albano in 1839 and he became Camerlengo in 1837.
