= College of Cardinals =

Body of all cardinals of the Catholic Church

College of Cardinals Collegium Cardinalium
- Catholic Church

Leadership
- Dean: Luis Antonio Tagle since 9 October 2026
- Vice-Dean: Leonardo Sandri since 18 January 2020
- Protopriest: Michael Michai Kitbunchu since 14 December 2016
- Protodeacon: Dominique Mamberti since 28 October 2024
- Seats: 242 (118 eligible to vote): John Paul II: 39 (4); Benedict XVI: 58 (17); Francis: 145 (97)

Elections
- Voting system: Appointment for life by the pope

Rules
- Cardinals below the age of 80 may vote in the conclave to elect a pope

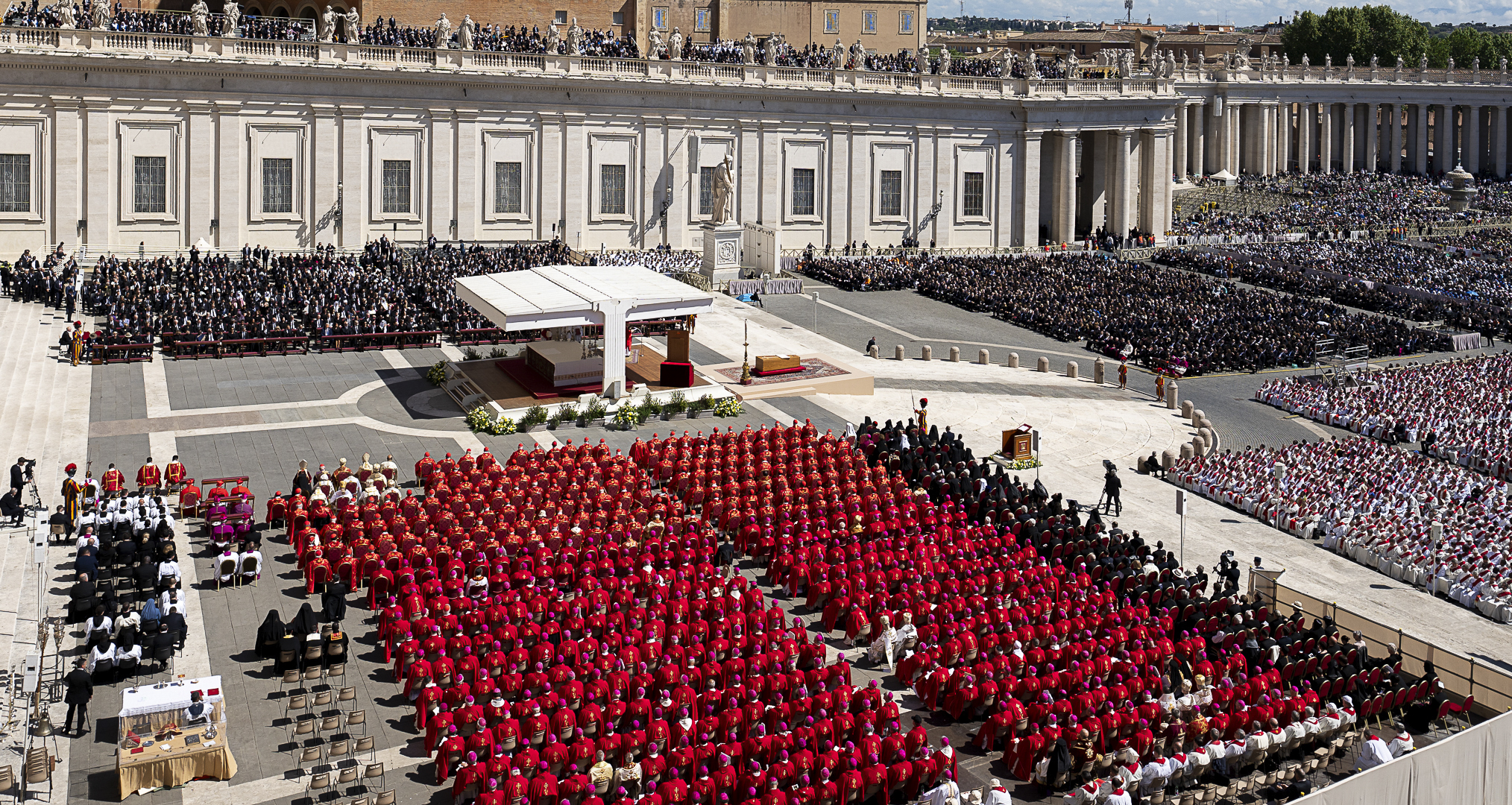
Cardinals in red vestments during the funeral mass for Pope Francis in 2025.

The College of Cardinals (Latin: Collegium Cardinalium), also called the Sacred College of Cardinals, is the body of all cardinals of the Catholic Church. As of 3 August 2026, there are 240 cardinals, of whom 116 are eligible to vote in a conclave to elect a new pope. Appointed by the pope, cardinals serve for life, but become ineligible to participate in a conclave if they turn 80 before a papal vacancy occurs.

Since the emergence of the College of Cardinals in the Early Middle Ages, the size of the body has historically been limited by popes, ecumenical councils ratified by the pope, and the College itself. The total number of cardinals from 1099 to 1986 has been about 2,900, nearly half of whom were created after 1655. This number excludes possible undocumented 12th-century cardinals and pseudocardinals appointed during the Western Schism by pontiffs now considered to be antipopes, and subject to some other sources of uncertainty.

== History ==
=== Development of the college ===
The word cardinal is derived from the Latin cardō, meaning "hinge". The office of cardinal as it is known today slowly evolved during the first millennium from the clergy of Rome. "The first time that the term cardinal appears in the Liber Pontificalis is in the biography of Pope Stephen III when in the Roman Synod of 769, it was decided that the Roman pontiff should be elected from among the deacons and cardinal priests."

During the pontificate of Pope Stephen V (816–817), the three classes of the College that are present today began to form. Stephen V decreed that all cardinal bishops were bound to sing Mass on rotation at the high altar at St. Peter's Basilica, one per Sunday. The first class to form were the cardinal deacons, direct theological descendants of the original seven ordained in Acts 6, followed by the cardinal priests, and then the cardinal bishops.

In 845, the Council of Meaux–Paris "required bishops to establish cardinal titles or parishes in their towns and outlining districts". At the same time, the popes began referring to the cardinal priests of Rome to serve as legates and delegates within Rome at ceremonies, synods, councils, etc., as well as abroad on diplomatic missions and councils. Those who were assigned to the latter roles were given the titles of Legatus a Latere (Cardinal Legate) and Missus Specialis (Special Envoy).

=== Later evolution ===
The College played an integral part in various reforms within the Church as well, as early as the pontificate of Pope Leo IX (1050). The College of Cardinals was empowered to elect Popes by Pope Nicholas II through his 1059 papal bull In nomine Domini, which was the culmination of the Gregorian Reforms, that arose after a prolonged period of interference by local aristocratic families, like the Theophylacti and Colonna, and the Holy Roman Emperor in papal selection process, which saw increased amounts of clerical abuse (see saeculum obscurum).

In the 12th century, the Third Council of the Lateran declared that only cardinals could assume the papacy, a requirement which has since lapsed.

From the 13th to 15th centuries, the size of the College of Cardinals never exceeded thirty, although there were more than thirty parishes and diaconal districts which could potentially have a titular holder. Pope John XXII (1316–1334) formalized this norm by limiting the College to twenty members. In the ensuing century, increasing the size of the College became a method for the pope to raise funds for construction or war, cultivate European alliances, and dilute the strength of the College as a spiritual and political counterweight to papal supremacy.

Pope Pius IX retained the Sacred College of Cardinals within the Fundamental Statute for the Secular Government of the States of the Church which he instituted for the Papal States in March 1848, describing it as a "Senate" inseparable from the Papacy.

=== Size of the College ===
The conclave capitulation of the 1352 conclave limited the size of the College to 20, and decreed that no new cardinals could be created until the size of the College had dropped to 16. In 1353, Pope Innocent VI declared the capitulation invalid.

By the end of the 14th century, the practice of having solely Italian cardinals had ceased. Between the 14th and 17th centuries, there was much struggle for the College between the cardinals and the reigning popes. Although some popes increased the number of cardinals in order to guarantee allies, Pope Benedict XII often refused to do so, and created six new cardinals on only one occasion, in 1338.

The Council of Basel (1431–1437), later transferred to Ferrara and then Florence, limited the size of the College to 24, as did the capitulation of the 1464 conclave. The capitulations of the 1484 (Pope Innocent VIII) and 1513 (Pope Leo X) conclaves contained the same restriction. The capitulation of the 1492 conclave also contained a restriction on the creation of new cardinals.

The Fifth Council of the Lateran (1512–1517), despite its detailed regulation of the lives of cardinals, did not consider the size of the College.

In 1517, Pope Leo X added another 31 cardinals, bringing the total to 65, so that he could have a supportive majority in the College of Cardinals. Pope Paul IV brought the total to 70. His immediate successor, Pope Pius IV (1559–1565), raised the limit to 76.

Emperor Ferdinand I sought a limit of 26 and complained about the size and quality of the College to his legates to the Council of Trent, and some French attendees advocated a limit of 24, but the council did not prescribe a limit to the size of the College. By the papacy of Pope Sixtus V (1585–1590), the number was set at 70 in 1586, divided among 14 cardinal deacons, 50 cardinal priests, and six cardinal bishops.

Popes respected that limit, until Pope John XXIII increased the number of cardinals several times to 88 in January 1961. Pope Paul VI continued this expansion, reaching 134 at his third consistory in April 1969.

In the 19th and 20th centuries, the College of Cardinals internationalized.

=== Number of electors ===
The total size of the College lost its significance when Paul VI decided to allow only cardinals under the age of 80 to vote in a conclave from 1971 onward. (Note: The exclusion of those who had turned 80 eliminated the voting rights of 25 cardinals. Before the new rule, there were 127 cardinals eligible to vote for a new pope, 38 of them Italian. Under the new rule, there were 102, 27 of them Italian. Cardinal Alfredo Ottaviani, then 80, said the pope's action was "an act committed in contempt of tradition that is centuries old" and was "throwing over board the bulk of his expert and gifted counselors". Cardinal Eugène Tisserant, 86, objected that each cardinal's health should determine his fitness and suggested that 73-year-old Paul VI seemed frail.) In 1975, Paul VI set the maximum number of those under 80, the cardinal electors, at 120. His next consistory in 1976 brought the number of cardinal electors to its full complement of 120.

All of Paul VI's successors have at times exceeded the 120 maximum, except for Pope John Paul I, who did not hold any consistories during his very short pontificate. Pope John Paul II reiterated the 120 maximum in 1996, yet his appointments to the College resulted in more than 120 cardinal electors in four of his nine consistories, reaching a high of 135 in February 2001 and again in October 2003. (Note: When exceeding the 120 limit, John Paul II approved "temporary derogations" of the rule so that all of those under 80 could participate in a conclave as electors.)

Three of Pope Benedict XVI's five consistories resulted in more than 120 cardinal electors, the high being 125 in 2012. Pope Francis exceeded the limit in all 10 of his consistories, reaching as high as 140 in December 2024.

=== Orders ===
Other changes to the College in the 20th century affected specific orders. The 1917 Code of Canon Law decreed that, from then on, only those who were priests or bishops could be chosen as cardinals, thus officially closing the historical period in which some cardinals could be clergy who had only received first tonsure and minor order, or the major orders of deacon and subdeacon, without a further ordination to the priesthood.

In 1961, Pope John XXIII reserved to the pope the right to assign any member of the College to one of the suburbicarian sees and the rank of cardinal bishop. Previously only the senior cardinal priest and the senior cardinal deacon had the privilege of requesting such an appointment (jus optionis) when a vacancy occurred. In 1962, he established that all cardinals should be bishops, ending the identification of the order of cardinal deacon with cardinals who were not bishops. He consecrated the twelve non-bishop members of the College himself. (Note: John XXIII codified this and other rules for the College in Cum gravissima dated 15 April 1962. On occasion a cardinal designate receives a dispensation from this rule. Pope John Paul II granted the first dispensation from this requirement to Henri de Lubac in 1983.)

In February 1965, Pope Paul VI decided that an Eastern Rite Patriarch who is created a cardinal would no longer be assigned a titular church in Rome, but maintain his see and join the order of cardinal bishops, the rank previously reserved to the six cardinals assigned to the suburbicarian dioceses. (Note: Paul VI codified this and other rules for the College in Ad pupuratorum patrem dated 11 February 1965. The one Eastern Rite Patriarch already a cardinal, Ignatius Gabriel I Tappouni, Patriarch of Antioch and a cardinal since 1935, resigned his cardinal's titular church Santi XII Apostoli and joined the order of cardinal bishops.) He also required that the suburbicarian bishops elect one of themselves as the dean and vice-dean of the College, instead of allowing them to select any member of the College. (Note: Paul VI codified this in Sacro cardinalium consilio dated 26 February 1965.) In June 2018, Pope Francis eased the rules governing the rank of cardinal bishop to open that rank to anyone of the pope's choosing, granting such cardinals the same privileges as those assigned suburbicarian sees.

=== Other modifications ===
Pope Francis adjusted the rules regarding the dean in December 2019, so he now serves for a term of five years, which can be renewed by the pope. No change was made regarding the vice-dean.

The resignation or removal of members has been a relatively rare phenomenon. Between 1791 and 2018, only one was removed from the College—Étienne Charles de Loménie de Brienne in 1791— and five resigned: Tommaso Antici in 1798, Marino Carafa di Belvedere in 1807, Carlo Odescalchi in 1838, Louis Billot in 1927, and Theodore Edgar McCarrick in 2018.

== Historical data ==
For the Middle Ages, sources concerning the size of the College of Cardinals are most frequently those relating to papal elections and conclaves.

Year	Size of the College
1099	18
1118	46
1119	46 or 47
1124	44
1130	44
1145	44
1198	26
1216	26
1227	18
1241	12 or 13
1244	6
1261	8
1264	21
1276	10
1277	7
1288	10
1294 (July)	11
1294 (December)	21
1303	18
1304	19
1312	16
1316	30
1327	16
1338	16
1348	16
1361	17
1371	30
1374	18
Source: Broderick, 1987, pp. 13–14.

Italian-born cardinals as percentage of the total College during each conclave
May 2025	20.32
2025	20.24
2013	22.60
2005	17.09
October 1978	22.50
August 1978	22.80
1963	35.36
1958	35.80
1939	54.80
1922	51.60
1914	50.76
1903	56.25
1878	65.57
1846	98.00
1830–1831	80.00
1829	82.00
1823	87.76
1799–1800	85.71

== Functions ==
A function of the College is to advise the pope about church matters when he summons them to an ordinary consistory, a term derived from the Roman Emperor's crown council. It attends various functions as a matter of protocol, for example, during the canonization process.

It convenes on the death or resignation of a pope as a papal conclave to elect a successor. It is then restricted to eligible cardinals under the age limit of 80, which was set for the first time in 1970 by Pope Paul VI.

The College has no ruling power, except during the sede vacante (papal vacancy) period. Even then, its powers are extremely limited by the terms of the current law, which is laid down in the apostolic constitution Universi Dominici gregis (1996) and the Fundamental Law of Vatican City State.

Historically, cardinals were the clergy serving parishes of the city of Rome under its bishop, the pope. The College acquired particular importance following the crowning of Henry IV as King of Germany and Holy Roman Emperor at the age of six, after the unexpected death of Henry III in 1056. Until then, the Holy See was often bitterly fought for among Rome's aristocratic families. External secular authorities had significant influence over who was to be appointed pope, and the Holy Roman Emperor in particular had the special power to appoint him.

This was significant as the aims and views of the Holy Roman Emperor and the Church did not always coincide. Churchmen involved in what has become known as the Gregorian Reform took advantage of the new king's lack of power and in 1059 reserved the election of the pope to the clergy of the Church in Rome. This was part of a larger power struggle, which became known as the Investiture Controversy, as the Church and the Emperor each attempted to gain more control over the appointment of bishops, and in doing so wield more influence in the lands and governments they were appointed to.

Reserving the election of a new pope as an exclusive matter of the cardinals represented a significant shift in the balance of power in the Early Medieval world. From the beginning of the 12th century, the College of Cardinals started to meet as such, when the cardinal bishops, cardinal priests and cardinal deacons ceased acting as separate groups.

=== Officials ===
In the Catholic church, the dean of the College of Cardinals and the cardinal vice-dean are the president and vice-president of the College. Both are elected by and from the cardinal bishops (cardinals of the highest order, including those holding suburbicarian dioceses), but the election requires papal confirmation. Except for presiding and delegating administrative tasks, they have no authority over the cardinals, acting as primus inter pares (first among equals).

The Holy See's secretary of state, the camerlengo of the Holy Roman Church, the vicar general of Rome, and the patriarchs of Venice and Lisbon, are usually cardinals, with few, usually temporary, exceptions. The Fundamental Law of Vatican City State requires that appointees to the state's legislative body, the Pontifical Commission for Vatican City State, be cardinals.

=== Electing the pope ===
Under the terms of Pope Paul VI's 1970 motu proprio Ingravescentem aetatem, cardinals who reached the age of 80 before a conclave opened had no vote in papal elections. Pope John Paul II's Universi Dominici gregis of February 1996 modified that rule slightly, so that cardinals who have reached the age of 80 before the day the see becomes vacant are not eligible to vote. This modification was put in place to prevent the date of the conclave being purposely scheduled or manipulated to include or exclude certain cardinals based on their age.

Canon law sets the general qualifications for a man to be appointed bishop quite broadly, requiring someone of faith and good reputation, at least thirty-five years old and with a certain level of education and five years' experience as a priest. The cardinals have nevertheless consistently elected the Bishop of Rome from among their own membership since the death of Pope Urban VI in 1389, the last non-cardinal to become pope. The conclave rules specify the procedures to be followed should they elect someone residing outside Vatican City or not yet a bishop.

Of the 117 cardinals under the age of 80 at the time of Pope Benedict XVI's resignation, 115 participated in the 2013 conclave that elected Pope Francis to succeed him. The two who did not participate were Julius Darmaatmadja (for health reasons) and Keith O'Brien (following allegations of sexual misconduct).

== See also ==
- Bishop (Catholic Church)
- Camerlengo of the Sacred College of Cardinals
- Catholic Church by country
- Catholic Church hierarchy
- Holy Synod
- Index of Vatican City-related articles
- List of the creations of the cardinals
- List of current cardinals
- List of titular churches
- Palatinus (Catholic Church)
- Papabile
- Protopriest
