= 1829 conclave =

Election of Catholic Pope Pius VIII

Papal conclave February–March 1829

Dates and location
- 24 February – 31 March 1829; Quirinal Palace, Papal States

Key officials
- Dean: Giulio Maria della Somaglia
- Sub-dean: Bartolomeo Pacca
- Camerlengo: Pietro Francesco Galleffi
- Protopriest: Giuseppe Firrao Jr.
- Protodeacon: Giuseppe Albani
- Secretary: Paolo Polidori

Election
- Electors: 50 (8 absentees)
- Candidates: Emmanuele de Gregorio; Bartolomeo Pacca
- Vetoed: Bartolomeo Pacca

Elected pope
- Francesco Castiglioni; Name taken: Pius VIII
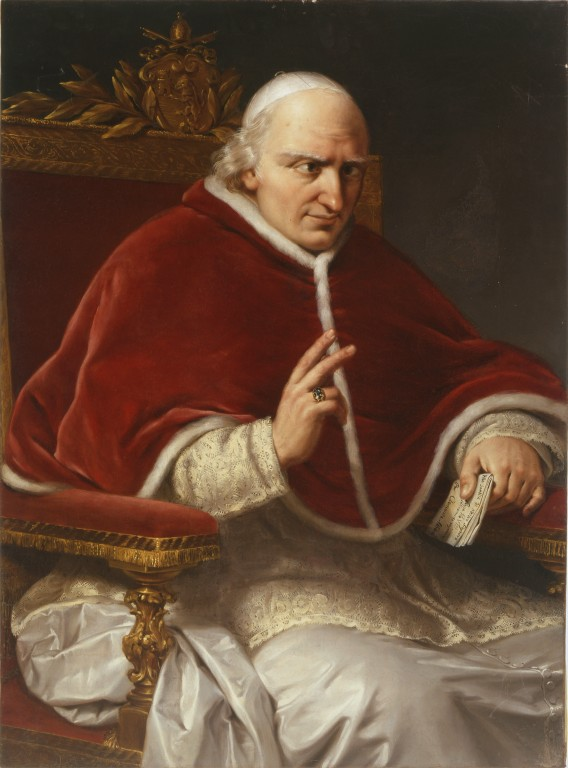

A papal conclave was held from 24 February to 31 March 1829 to elect a new pope to succeed Leo XII, who had died on 10 February. Of the 50 members of the College of Cardinals, all but eight attended. (Note: The current 80-year-old age limit for cardinal electors was introduced by Pope Paul VI in 1970.) On the final ballot, the conclave elected Cardinal Francesco Castiglioni, the prefect of the Congregation of the Index. After accepting his election, he took the name Pius VIII.

It took a long time for the conclave to elect a new pope due to conflict between secular governments concerning who should be elected. Cardinal Emmanuele De Gregorio was the proposed candidate of the pro-French faction and the zelanti (conservative cardinals), whilst Cardinal Bartolomeo Pacca was proposed by the more moderate cardinals, but he was not accepted by the French government of the Bourbon Restoration, headed by King Charles X and Prime Minister Jean Baptiste Gay. Pacca was also seen by many in the conclave as being too gentle to be an effective pope.

== Description ==
The conclave did not move rapidly. The arrival of Giuseppe Albani caused the votes to center on Francesco Saverio Castiglioni. With the supporters of both De Gregorio and of Pacca unable to secure enough votes to elect their candidate to the papacy, Castiglioni came to be seen as a suitable compromise candidate. Castiglioni had been close to election in the 1823 conclave as the representative of the politicanti (moderate cardinals) and had all the qualifications to become pope, though he had the problem of being in very poor health, but was not elected at the last conclave when the zelanti cardinals realized that he was quite close to Cardinal Ercole Consalvi. Consalvi however was already dead by the time of the 1829 conclave having died during the pontificate of Pope Leo XII.

On 31 March, Cardinal Castiglioni was elected pope. Given that Castiglioni had been called Pius VIII by Pius VII even before his death in 1823, and that Leo XII had said that Castiglioni "some day was to be Pius VIII" in the 1823 conclave, it was therefore a foregone conclusion that he would take that papal name upon becoming pope.

Cardinal electors by region
Region	Number
Italy	41
Rest of Europe	9
North America	0
South America	0
Asia	0
Oceania	0
Africa	0
Total	50
