= Benincasa da Montepulciano =

Italian monk

Blessed Benincasa da Montepulciano O.S.M.
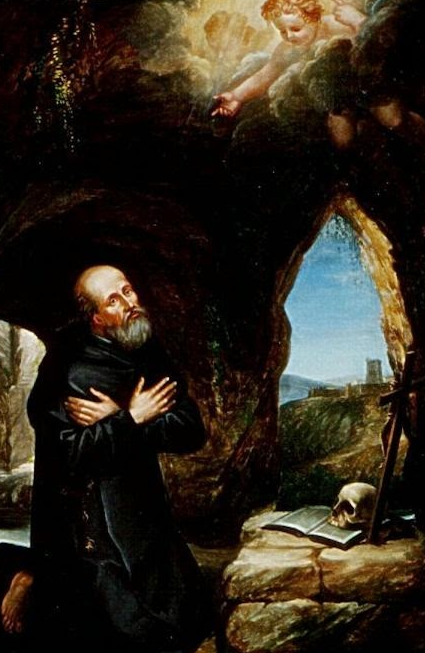

Religious, Hermit
- Born: 1375; Montepulciano, Siena, Republic of Siena
- Died: 9 May 1426 (aged 51); Monticchiello, Siena, Republic of Siena
- Venerated in: Roman Catholic Church
- Beatified: 23 December 1829, Saint Peter's Basilica, Papal States by Pope Pius VIII
- Feast: 9 May; 11 May (Servites)
- Attributes: Servite habit Crucifix; Skull; Book
- Patronage: Montepulciano

Benincasa da Montepulciano (1375 - 9 May 1426) was an Italian Roman Catholic professed religious from the Servite Order. He lived as a hermit in Siena his entire life since he joined the order as a teenager and dedicated himself to a quiet life of servitude to God in contemplation despite still receiving visitors and orders from his superiors.

His beatification received formal confirmation on 23 December 1829 once Pope Pius VIII issued formal approval to the late friar's enduring and local 'cultus' - or popular veneration.

== Life ==
Benincasa da Montepulciano was born in 1375 in the Republic of Siena in the small town of Montepulciano.

He became a professed members of the Servite Order as a teenager and in 1400 he became a hermit in a small cell that he fashioned on Monte Amiata near Siena and spent his life there feeding on the food that visitors brought to him as well as practicing exorcisms on occasion. He lived at the Bagni San Filippo where Saint Philip Benizi once lived as a penitent. Around the time he turned 50 his superiors from the Servites asked him to move their convent into the town of Monticchiello where he spent his final months.

Benicasa died in mid-1426 after spending his final months at the relocated convent in Monticchiello. His remains were interred - after several transferrals - to the Monticchiello church of Saint Martin though no trace of his remains now remain. The townspeople - in his honor - constructed in 1494 a convent for the Servites adjacent to the said church.

== Beatification ==
The beatification process opened in 1822 under Pope Pius VII and another process opened in 1829. His beatification received formal approval from Pope Pius VIII on 23 December 1829 after the pontiff issued formal ratification to the late friar's local 'cultus' - otherwise known as popular and enduring veneration.
