= Pope Pius VIII =

Head of the Catholic Church from 1829 to 1830

- Bishop of Rome
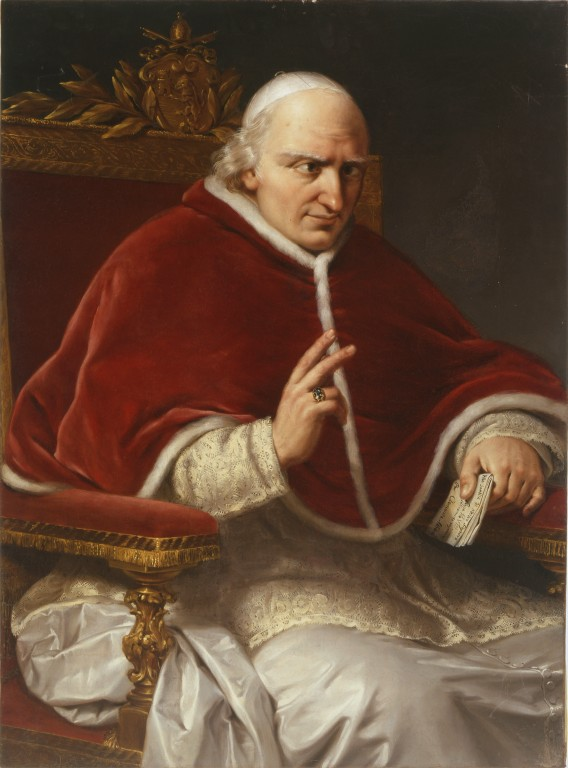
- Portrait by Clemente Alberi, c. 1830
- Church: Catholic Church
- Papacy began: 31 March 1829
- Papacy ended: 30 November 1830
- Predecessor: Leo XII
- Successor: Gregory XVI
- Previous posts: Bishop of Montalto (1800‍–‍1816); Bishop of Cesena (1816‍–‍1821); Cardinal Priest of Santa Maria in Traspontina (1816‍–‍1821); Major Penitentiary of the Apostolic Penitentiary (1821‍–‍1829); Prefect of the Congregation of the Index (1821‍–‍1829); Cardinal Bishop of Frascati (1821‍–‍1829)

Orders
- Ordination: 17 December 1785 by Giuseppe Doria Pamphili
- Consecration: 17 August 1800 by Giuseppe Doria Pamphili
- Created cardinal: 8 March 1816 by Pius VII

Personal details
- Born: Francesco Saverio Maria Felice Castiglioni; 20 November 1761 Cingoli, Papal States
- Died: 30 November 1830 (aged 69) Quirinal Palace, Rome, Papal States
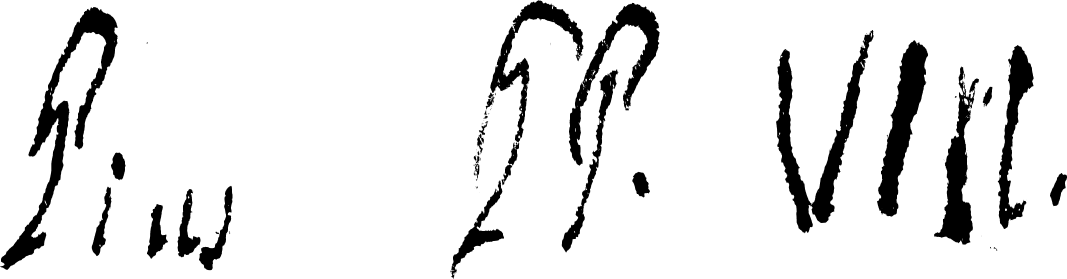
- Signature

- Coat of arms

Pope Pius VIII (Italian: Pio VIII; born Francesco Saverio Maria Felice Castiglioni; 20 November 1761 – 30 November 1830) was head of the Catholic Church and leader of the Papal States from 31 March 1829 to his death in November 1830.

His brief papacy witnessed the Catholic Emancipation in the United Kingdom in 1829, which he welcomed, and the July Revolution in France in 1830, which he accepted with reluctance. He is often remembered for his writings on marriages between Catholics and Protestants: in the 1830 brief Litteris altero abhinc, he declared that a marriage could only be properly blessed if proper provisions had been made to ensure the bringing up of children in the Catholic faith. His death less than two years after his election to the papacy led to speculation of possible murder. His pontificate was the shortest in the 19th century.

== Early life ==
Francesco Saverio Castiglioni was born in Cingoli, Marche, the third of eight children of Count Ottavio Castiglioni (1714 - 1804) and his wife Sanzia/Sancia Teresa Ghislieri. His brother Filippo Giulio Castiglioni (1774 - 1846) married and had Radegonda Nazzarena Castiglioni, born in 1810, who was married to a maternal nephew of Pope Pius IX. His baptismal name was recorded as Francesco Saverio Maria Felice. An ancestor of his was Pope Celestine IV. He studied at the Collegio Campana run by the Society of Jesus and, after that, at the University of Bologna, where he earned a doctorate in canon and civil law (utroque iure) in 1785. He was ordained to the priesthood in Rome on 17 December 1785.

He served as the Vicar General of Anagni (1788–1790), Fano (1790–1797) and Ascoli Piceno (1797–1800).

== Episcopate and cardinalate ==
On 11 August 1800 Castiglioni was appointed Bishop of Montalto. He received episcopal consecration on 17 August in Rome at the Church of Santi Domenico e Sisto. Cardinal Giuseppe Doria Pamphili served as consecrator, assisted by Nicola Buschi and Camillo Campanelli. He refused to swear allegiance to Napoleon or to his client state, the Kingdom of Italy. On 29 July 1808 he was arrested and taken to Milan. Castiglioni was subsequently taken to Pavia, to Mantua, and then to Turin, where he arrived on 10 November 1813. On 18 November he was brought back to Milan. Finally, after Napoleon fell, Castiglioni returned to his diocese on 16 June 1814. He was praised by Pope Pius VII who in 1816 elevated him to the cardinalate as the Cardinal-Priest of Santa Maria in Traspontina. He held various high offices thereafter, including that of Apostolic Penitentiary. He soon became a Cardinal-Bishop of the suburbicarian see of Frascati.

Castiglioni was considered a front-runner in the conclave of 1823. He was known to be close to Pius VII, who often referred to Castiglioni as "Pius VIII". However, he failed to gain the necessary votes, in part due to controversy surrounding an alliance between him and another favorite, Secretary of State Ercole Consalvi. Annibale Cardinal della Genga was elected instead, and he took the name of Pope Leo XII. Leo XII stated that Castiglioni would one day be called "Pius VIII".

== Papacy ==
Papal styles of Pope Pius VIII
- Reference style: His Holiness
- Spoken style: Your Holiness
- Religious style: Holy Father
- Posthumous style: None

=== Election ===
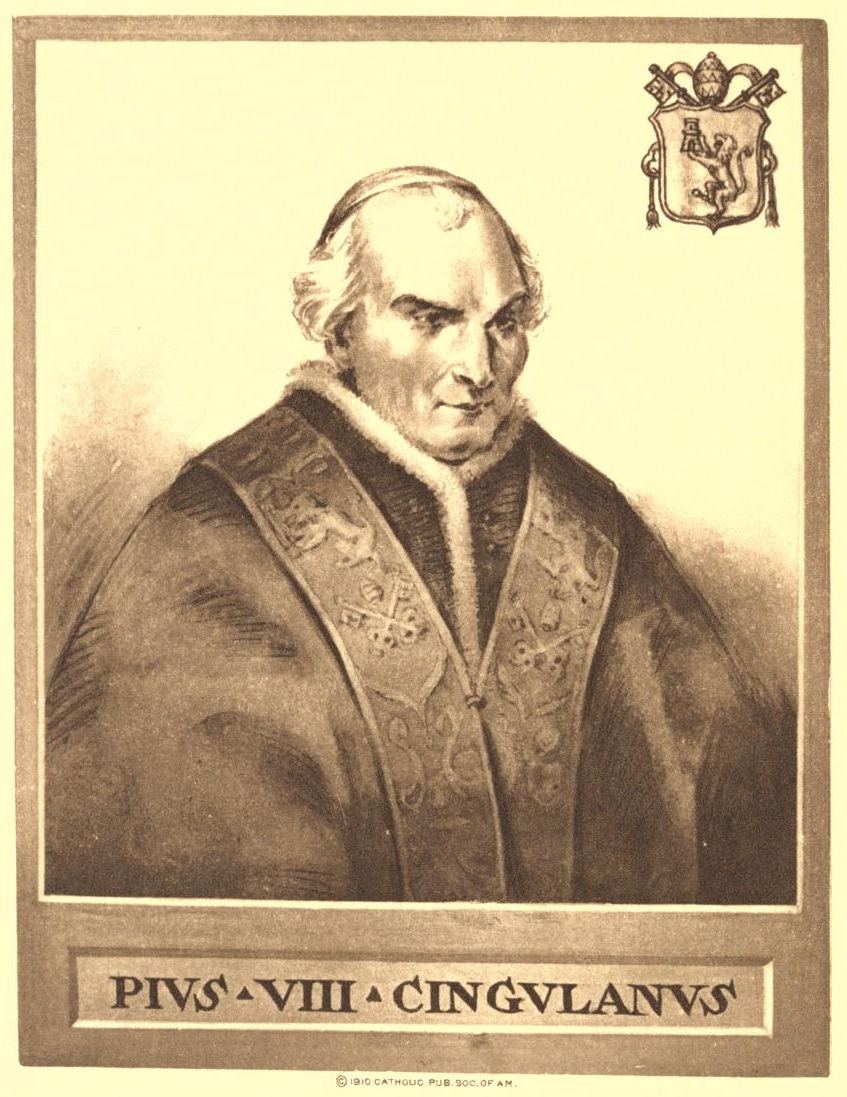
Illustration of Pope Pius VIII

After the death of Pope Leo XII in 1829, Castiglioni, who had all the qualities and skills required to be pope, was again considered to be a major candidate, though was questioned due to his frail health and age. Despite these concerns, he was elected as pope in the papal conclave of 1829. Given that both Popes Pius VII and Leo XII had referred to him as Pius VIII, it seemed only suitable that it was the pontifical name that he chose. He was crowned on 5 April 1829 by Cardinal Giuseppe Albani.

Throughout the conclave, Cardinal Albani settled on proposing Castiglioni as a candidate for the papacy on the basis that his infirmities and age would see a short papacy in which he could persuade the ailing pontiff to hand over aspects of governance to himself. This was on the basis that Albani did not desire to be pope, but rather to be appointed as Cardinal Secretary of State in which he would hold power in terms of ecclesial governance. Albani approached Castiglioni with his offer, drawing up an agreement which Castiglioni signed without demur. With Castiglioni elected, Albani ended up being appointed to his desired posting.

When the conclave opened, the French cardinals were told that the French court would support seven cardinals for the papacy, which included Castiglioni. King Charles X had a very positive opinion of Castiglioni, and favored either Castiglioni, Placido Zurla, Emmanuele de Gregorio, or Cesare Brancadoro to become pope. Castiglioni led in the first ballot with eleven votes, and on 4 March in his capacity as the Major Penitentiary distributed ashes to the cardinals since it was Ash Wednesday. While there were whispers of a faction supporting de Gregorio, a faction consisting of Cardinals Antonio Maria Frosini, Carlo Maria Pedicini, Antonio Palotta, Tommaso Maria Raimondo Leopoldo Arezzo, and Agostino Rivarola was said to have started shoring up support for Castiglioni. On 6 March, de Gregorio was still in the lead, with Castiglioni receiving fifteen votes in the afternoon scrutiny. Due to a series of controversies surrounding de Gregorio throughout the day, de Gregorio's votes had fallen on 7 March, while Castiglioni received fourteen in the morning and fifteen in the afternoon. On 14 March, Castiglioni received 20 votes in the morning and 23 in the afternoon, while fluctuating on 15 and 16 March. Castiglioni received 22 votes in the 20 March morning vote while Bartolomeo Pacca's votes increased that afternoon from 11 to 19 in a bid to end the deadlock and elect a compromise candidate. Castiglioni's voting total remained the same on the following day.

In the morning vote on 23 March, he had received 24 votes and received 26 in the afternoon. Meanwhile, Cappellari received 19 votes that had originally been cast for Pacca due to his supporters deciding upon him as an amenable compromise and because Pacca was officially vetoed. On 24 March, Cardinals Carlo Oppizzoni and Fabrizio Sceberras Testaferrata, from different factions, were both privately in agreement to canvass additional support for Castiglioni. While Cappellari received 22 votes in an indication that his candidacy was improving, Castiglioni received 23 votes while de Gregorio had sunk to two votes. On 26 March, in the afternoon scrutiny, de Gregorio had suddenly risen to 24 votes while Castiglioni had sunk to 14 or 15. He sunk to 13 on 28 March, though the results changed on 30 March in which de Gregorio had secured 23 votes and Castiglioni had secured just over 25 in the morning, only for both candidates to sink in the afternoon scrutiny. On 31 March, he had secured 28 votes with a clear lead, and barely had two-thirds majority in the morning ballot. In the next ballot, Castiglioni was elected as pope with 47 votes.

=== Liberalism and Biblical translations ===
As Pope Pius VIII, he initiated some reforms in the Papal States. On 24 May 1829 he issued an encyclical, Traditi humilitati. Regarding religious pluralism, he condemned the "foul contrivance of the sophists of this age" that would place Catholicism on a par with any other religion. Regarding Bible translations, he wrote in that encyclical:

We must also be wary of those who publish the Bible with new interpretations contrary to the Church's laws. They skillfully distort the meaning by their own interpretation. They print the Bibles in the vernacular and, absorbing an incredible expense, offer them free even to the uneducated. Furthermore, the Bibles are rarely without perverse little inserts to ensure that the reader imbibes their lethal poison instead of the saving water of salvation.

On 25 March 1830, in his brief Litteris altero alteris, he condemned the masonic secret societies and modernist biblical translations.

A further letter of pastoral concern sent to the Upper Rhineland bishops, which Pius wrote at the end of June 1830, is referred to by his successor Gregory XVI in the latter's papal brief Quo Graviora of 1833. Gregory refers to a request for information on the bishops' actions in response, which he says "though three years have elapsed", had not yet been received.

=== Marriage ===
Pius accepted the situation on mixed marriages between Protestants and Catholics in Germany, but he opposed changes in Ireland and Poland, which were still strongly Catholic. In his brief Litteris altero abhinc, he declared that a mixed marriage could only be blessed by a priest if proper promises had been made to educate the children of the marriage as Catholics. However, the brief also which allowed priests to offer "passive assistance" at a mixed marriage ceremony when the non-Catholic party declined to make the oath providing for the children of the marriage to be brought up as Catholics. The provision for "passive assistance" meant that a priest could conduct a wedding, acting as a witness, but the marriage would not be blessed or seen as a sacrament.

=== Organisation of Catholic dioceses ===
The Holy See's website refers to three papal briefs ("breve") bearing the name Inter multiplices:

- a brief of 15 May 1829 establishing the Diocese of Mobile, at that time covering the states of Alabama and Florida.
- a brief of 11 August 1829 separating the pastoral care of Prince Edward Island (PEI), New Brunswick and the Magdalen Islands in Canada from the Diocese of Quebec, creating a new episcopal see based in Charlottetown, PEI.
- a brief of 4 September 1829 separating the territory of Cape Breton from the Diocese of Quebec and placing it in the care of the Apostolic Vicar of Nova Scotia.

In the last of these letters, he wrote that his concern for "the state of the Dioceses distributed over the entire earth" occupied a place second to none among his cares.

=== Consistories ===
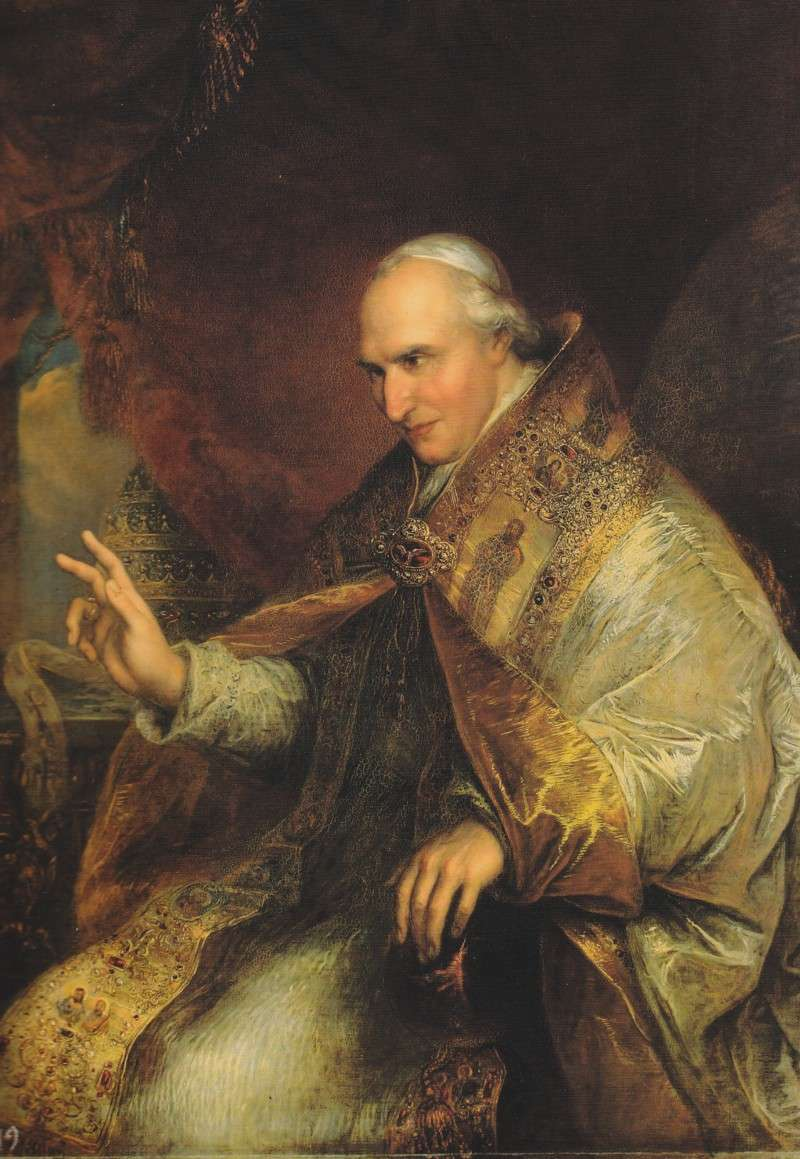
Painting of Pius VIII by Ferdinando Cavalleri

Pius VIII also held three consistories in which he elevated a total of six men into the cardinalate. He held these ceremonies on 27 July 1829, 15 March 1830 and 5 July 1830. Pius VIII also nominated eight cardinals "in pectore" in the March 1830 consistory, however, he never publicly revealed the names before his death hence rendering the appointments moot.

=== Beatifications ===
He canonized no saints during his brief pontificate but he beatified two individuals. On 23 December 1829 he beatified Benincasa da Montepulciano, and on 4 March 1830 he beatified Chiara Gambacorti. Pius VIII proclaimed Saint Bernard of Clairvaux a Doctor of the Church on 20 August 1830, titling him as "Doctor mellifluus" ("Mellifluous Doctor").

=== Other activities ===
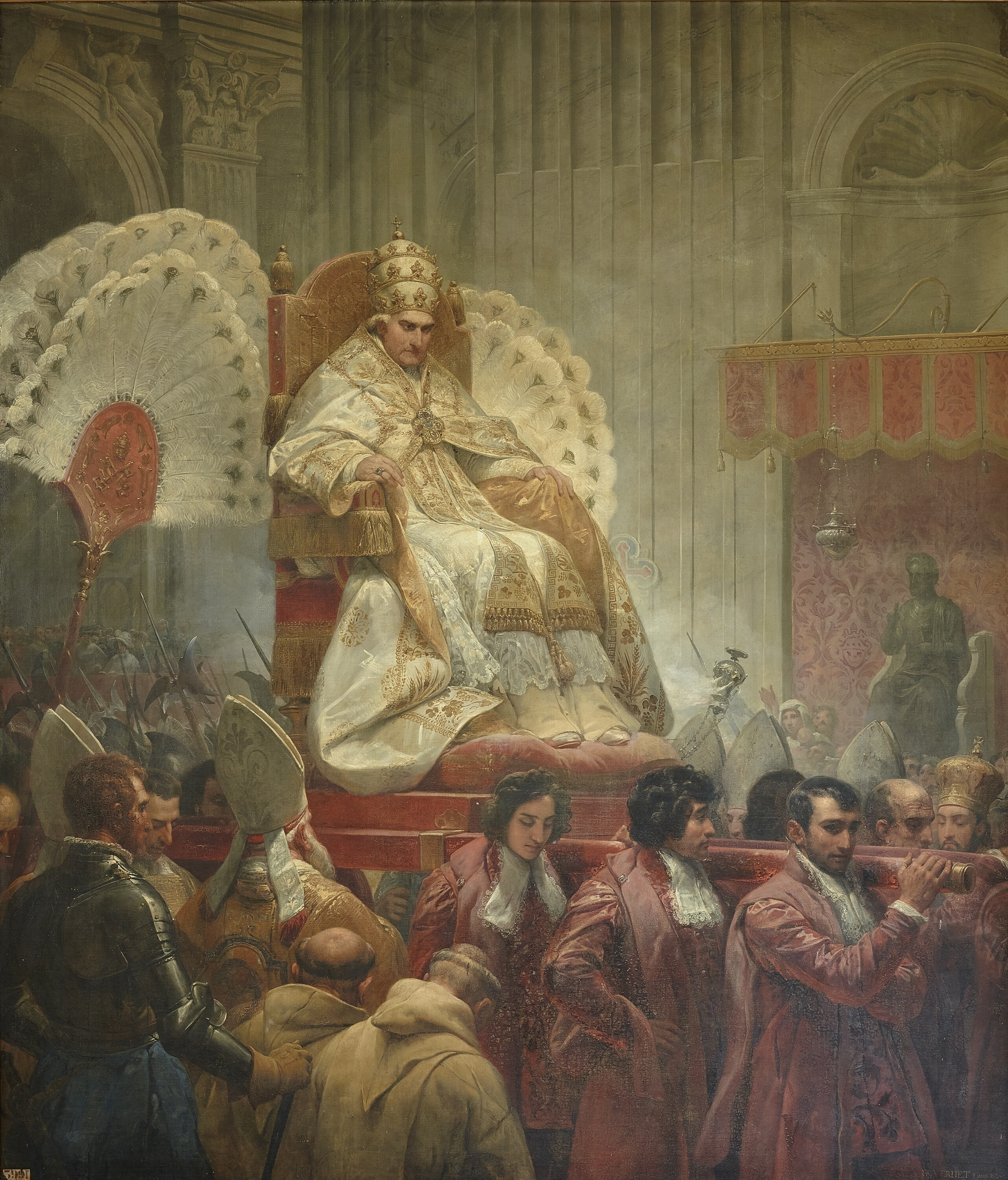
1829 painting by Horace Vernet of Pius VIII in the Sedia gestatoria

Pius' brief pontificate saw the Catholic Emancipation in the United Kingdom and the July Revolution in France, which occurred in 1829 and 1830, respectively. Pius VIII recognised Louis Philippe I (1830–48) as French king and allowed him to use the French king's customary title "Roi Très Chrétien", which means "His Most Christian Majesty".

Also of remarkable importance to the future is a letter of his to a French bishop, in which he allowed the taking of moderate interest (under the principle of foregoing a profit by investing the lent capital; see Vix pervenit for the discussion of the topic).

Being, at that time, head of the Papal States, he remained popular for decades for removing the so-called cancelletti (grids) from the taverns, which Leo XII had ordered to be put there to hinder the consumption of wine unless accompanied by a meal. A poem was written about him that ran thus:

"Allor che il sommo Pio / comparve innanzi a Dio / gli domandò: Che hai fatto? / Rispose: Nient'ho fatto. / Corresser gli angeletti: / Levò i cancelletti."

which in English roughly reads: At the time when the highest Pius / approached God in the highest / He asked him: What have you got done? / He answered: "There's nothing I've got done." / But the angels present knew better: / "He cancelled the cancelletter".

=== Health and death ===
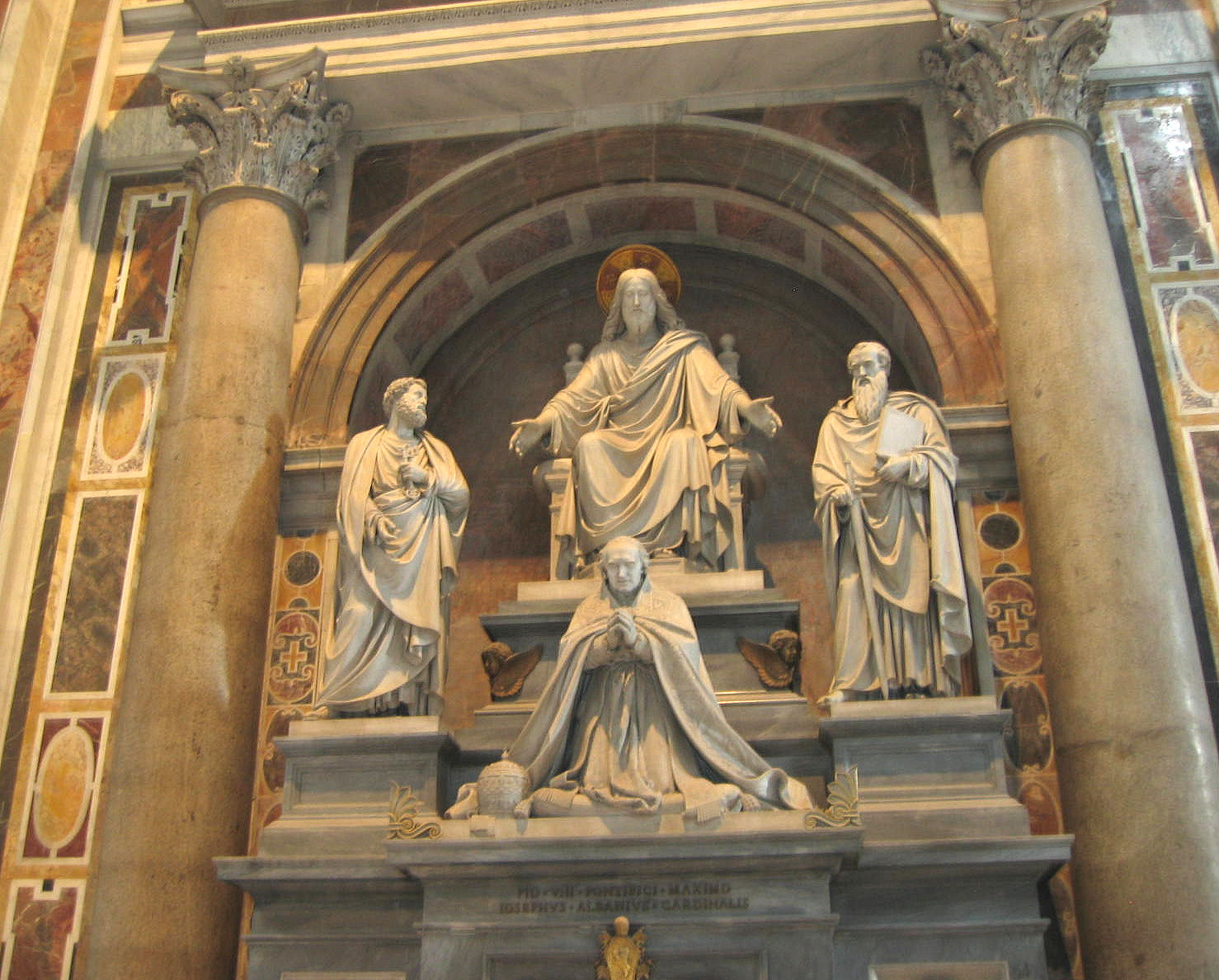
Monument and Tomb in Saint Peter's Basilica

Pius VIII was in very poor health during most of his papacy. He became very ill in early November 1830, developing fistulas on his neck and knee while his entire body became covered with pustules, which the doctors were able to manage by 15 November. Pius VIII became seriously ill again on 23 November, had difficulties in breathing for the following three nights, and was given the Viaticum on 28 November and the Extreme Unction later that day at 9:30pm. He died on 30 November 1830 at the age of 69 in the Quirinal Palace in Rome.

Certain theories have emerged suggesting that Pius VIII was poisoned, but no proof has been found to verify this claim.

Cardinal Camillo di Pietro gave the funeral oration for the late pope, before the cardinals entered the conclave to choose a successor. Pius VIII was succeeded by Pope Gregory XVI.

== Episcopal lineage ==
The pope's episcopal lineage, or apostolic succession was:

- Cardinal Scipione Rebiba
- Cardinal Giulio Antonio Santorio
- Cardinal Girolamo Bernerio
- Archbishop Galeazzo Sanvitale
- Cardinal Ludovico Ludovisi
- Cardinal Luigi Caetani
- Cardinal Ulderico Carpegna
- Cardinal Paluzzo Paluzzi Altieri degli Albertoni
- Pope Benedict XIII
- Pope Benedict XIV
- Cardinal Enrico Enríquez
- Archbishop Manuel Quintano Bonifaz
- Cardinal Buenaventura Fernández de Córdoba Spínola
- Cardinal Giuseppe Doria Pamphili
- Pope Pius VIII

== See also ==
- Cardinals created by Pius VIII
- List of popes

== Sources ==
- Hearder, Harry (2014). Italy in the Age of the Risorgimento 1790 - 1870. Routledge. ISBN 978-0582491465.

== Literature ==
- Giuseppe Monsagrati: Pio VIII. In: Massimo Bray (ed.): Enciclopedia dei Papi. Volume 3: Innocenzo VIII, Giovanni Paolo II. Istituto della Enciclopedia Italiana, Rome 2000 (treccani.it)
- Christof Dahm (1994). "Pius VIII". In Bautz, Traugott (ed.). Biographisch-Bibliographisches Kirchenlexikon (BBKL) (in German). Vol. 7. Herzberg: Bautz. cols. 673–677. ISBN 3-88309-048-4.

Catholic Church titles
Preceded by Francesco Antonio Marcucci	Bishop of Montalto; 11 August 1800 – 8 March 1816	Succeeded by Pietro Paolo Mazzichi
Preceded by Carlo Bellisomi	Bishop of Cesena; 8 March 1816 – 4 August 1821	Succeeded by Antonio Maria Cadolini
Preceded by Michele di Pietro	Major Penitentiary of Sacred Apostolic Penitentiary; 4 August 1821 – 31 March 1829	Succeeded by Emmanuele De Gregorio
Preceded by Leo XII	Pope; 31 March 1829 – 30 November 1830	Succeeded by Gregory XVI
