= Luigi Lambruschini =

Italian Cardinal

His Eminence Luigi Lambruschini B.
- Prefect of the Congregation for Rites
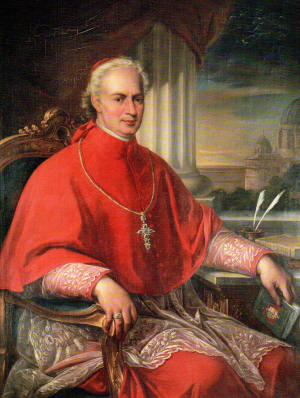
- Church: Roman Catholic Church
- Appointed: 8 June 1847
- Term ended: 12 May 1854
- Predecessor: Ludovico Micara
- Successor: Costantino Patrizi Naro
- Other posts: Prefect of the Congregation for Studies (1834–54); Cardinal-Bishop of Porto e Santa Rufina (1847–54); Vice-Dean of the College of Cardinals (1847–54)
- Previous posts: Secretary of the Extraordinary Congregation for the Ecclesiastical Affairs of the Catholic World (1815–16); Archbishop of Genoa (1819–30); Apostolic Nuncio to France (1826–31); Titular Archbishop of Beirut (1830–31); Cardinal-Priest of San Callisto (1832–42); Archivist of the Vatican Secret Archives (1834–53); Librarian of the Vatican Apostolic Library (1834–53); Cardinal-Bishop of Sabina (1842–47); Camerlengo of the College of Cardinals (1844–45)

Orders
- Ordination: 1 January 1799 by Giovanni Luca Solari
- Consecration: 3 October 1819 by Giulio Maria della Somaglia
- Created cardinal: 30 September 1831 by Pope Gregory XVI
- Rank: Cardinal-Priest (1832–42); Cardinal-Bishop (1842–54)

Personal details
- Born: Emmanuele Niccolò Lambruschini; 6 March 1776 Sestri Levante, Republic of Genoa
- Died: 12 May 1854 (aged 78) Rome, Papal States
- Buried: San Carlo ai Catinari
- Parents: Bernardo Lambruschini; Pellegrina Raggi
- Coat of arms

Luigi Lambruschini (6 March 1776 – 12 May 1854) was an Italian cardinal of the Roman Catholic Church in the mid nineteenth century. He was a member of the Clerics Regular of St. Paul and served in the diplomatic corps of the Holy See.

== Biography ==
=== Early life ===
The youngest of ten children, he was born in Sestri Levante, then part of the independent Republic of Genoa, to Bernardo and Pellegrina Raggi Lambruschini, and baptized Emmanuele Nicolo. His older brother, Giovanni Battista Lambruschini became bishop of the Diocese of Orvieto.

Lambruschini attended a Jesuit school in Santa Margherita Ligure, and then the Oratorio di San Bartolomeo in Bordighera, run by the Order of the Barnabites. He entered the order in 1793, and after a novitiate, pronounced solemn vows in November 1794, taking the name of Luigi. He was then to Macerata for further study, took minor orders in Rome in 1797, and was ordained a priest back home in Sestri Levante in January 1799. He then taught Barnabite seminarians rhetoric, philosophy and mathematics, first in Bologna, then in San Severino Marche and, from May 1801, in Macerata.

=== Diplomatic career ===
He attended the Congress of Vienna in 1815 as secretary to Cardinal Ercole Consalvi. As secretary of the Congregation of Extraordinary Ecclesiastical Affairs, he took part in concluding concordats with various states, including Tuscany, Naples, and Bavaria. According to Umberto Benigni, "Next to Consalvi and Pacca, Lambruschini was among the greatest diplomats of the Holy See in the nineteenth century." In 1816, Lambruschini became vice-general of the Barnabite order.

In 1819, Lambruschini was appointed Archbishop of Genoa. It was rumored that his promotion was to be attributed to the desire of Secretary of State Consalvi to remove from Rome a clergyman who, having acquired too much influence on the pope, was now an obstacle to his own plans for government. In 1826, he was named as Apostolic Nuncio to the Kingdom of France by Pope Pius VII, but was forced to flee his diplomatic post following the 1830 revolution that toppled the Bourbon monarchy and brought House of Orleans pretender Louis-Phillippe to the French throne.

He was made a cardinal in 1831, given the titular church of San Callisto on 24 February 1832. For the next four years, Cardinal Lambruschini held various curial posts until in January 1836 he was appointed Secretary of State to Pope Gregory XVI. His appointment was seen as a compromise between those who hoped for reform and the zealanti who wished to see dissent more forcefully suppressed; although it was said that the Cardinal was "liberal chiefly in his employment of spies and prisons".

He was the leading conservative candidate in the 1846 papal conclave. Though he received a majority of the votes initially, it was clear that he could not achieve the required two-thirds majority. He was eventually defeated by the liberal candidate, Giovanni Maria Mastai Ferretti, the Archbishop (personal title) of Imola, who became Pope Pius IX.

Lambruschini was a particularly hated figure among the masonic republicans during the 1848 Revolutions that temporarily deposed Pope Pius IX. His house was ransacked and he was forced to flee for his life, disguised as a stablehand. He returned following the Pope's restoration. He died in Rome on 12 May 1854 and was buried in the Barnabite church of San Carlo ai Catinari, Rome.

=== Lambruschini Family ===
The Lambruschini family is a very large family. The Cardinal had several brothers. Some descendants of these brothers stayed in Italy, others moved to France, Portugal the United States and even South America (Peru, Chile, Argentina, and Uruguay).

=== Relatives and Descendants of the Lambruschini Family ===
- Louis Philippe, Duke of Orleans King of France (1773-1850) was cousin of the Cardinal Lambruschini.
- Giovanni Battista Lambruschini was the Bishop of Orvieto.
- Raffaello Lambruschini was an Italian politician, religious, agronomist, and educator.
- Bartolomeo Lambruschini married Bianca Nicolini (her family built The Basilica of Santa Croce in Florence).
- Stefano Lambruschini was a priest.
- Ferdinando Lambruschini was the Archbishop of Perugia.
- Raul Leal, Portuguese poet and philosopher
- Ericka Koehler, American-Peruvian educator, digital marketer, and writer.
- Sheilla Castro, Peruvian lawyer.

== Works ==
- A Polemical Treatise on the Immaculate Conception of Mary, 1842

== See also ==
- Our Lady of La Salette

== Sources ==
- Manzini, Luigi M. (1960). Il cardinale Luigi Lambruschini (in Italian). Biblioteca apostolica vaticana. ISBN 9788821000270.

Catholic Church titles
Preceded by Tommaso Bernetti	Cardinal Secretary of State; 1836–1846	Succeeded by Pasquale Tommaso Gizzi
