= Castruccio Castracane degli Antelminelli =

Italian cardinal (1779–1852)

His Eminence Castruccio Castracane degli Antelminelli
- Major Penitentiary of the Apostolic Penitentiary
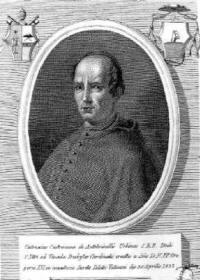
- Church: Roman Catholic Church
- Appointed: 12 November 1839
- Term ended: 22 February 1852
- Predecessor: Emmanuele de Gregorio
- Successor: Gabriele Ferretti
- Other post: Cardinal bishop of Palestrina (1844–52)
- Previous posts: Secretary of the Congregation for Extraordinary Ecclesiastical Affairs (1825–28); Secretary of the Congregation for the Propagation of the Faith (1828–33); Cardinal-Priest of San Pietro in Vincoli (1833–44); Prefect of the Congregation of Indulgences and Sacred Relics (1834–39); Camerlengo of the College of Cardinals (1846–47)

Orders
- Consecration: 11 February 1844 by Pope Gregory XVI
- Created cardinal: 15 April 1833 by Pope Gregory XVI
- Rank: Cardinal priest (1833–44); Cardinal bishop (1844–52)

Personal details
- Born: Castruccio Castracane degli Antelminelli; 21 September 1779 Urbino, Papal States
- Died: 22 February 1852 (aged 72) Rome, Papal States
- Buried: San Pietro in Vincoli
- Parents: Giuseppe Castracane degli Antelminelli; Gentilina Honorati
- Education: Collegio Romano; Pontifical Academy of Ecclesiastical Nobles

Castruccio Castracane degli Antelminelli (Urbino, 21 September 1779 – Rome, 22 February 1852) was an Italian priest, who was made a cardinal by Pope Gregory XVI in the consistory of 15 April 1833 as cardinal priest of San Pietro in Vincoli, and in 1844 created cardinal bishop of Palestrina.
