= 1830–1831 conclave =

Election of Catholic Pope Gregory XVI

Papal conclave 1830–31

Dates and location
- 14 December 1830 – 2 February 1831; Quirinal Palace, Papal States

Key officials
- Dean: Bartolomeo Pacca
- Sub-dean: Pietro Francesco Galleffi
- Camerlengo: Pietro Francesco Galleffi
- Protopriest: Luigi Ruffo-Scilla
- Protodeacon: Giuseppe Albani
- Secretary: Paolo Polidori

Election
- Electors: 45 (9 absentees)
- Vetoed: Giacomo Giustiniani
- Ballots: 83

Elected pope
- Bartolomeo Cappellari; Name taken: Gregory XVI
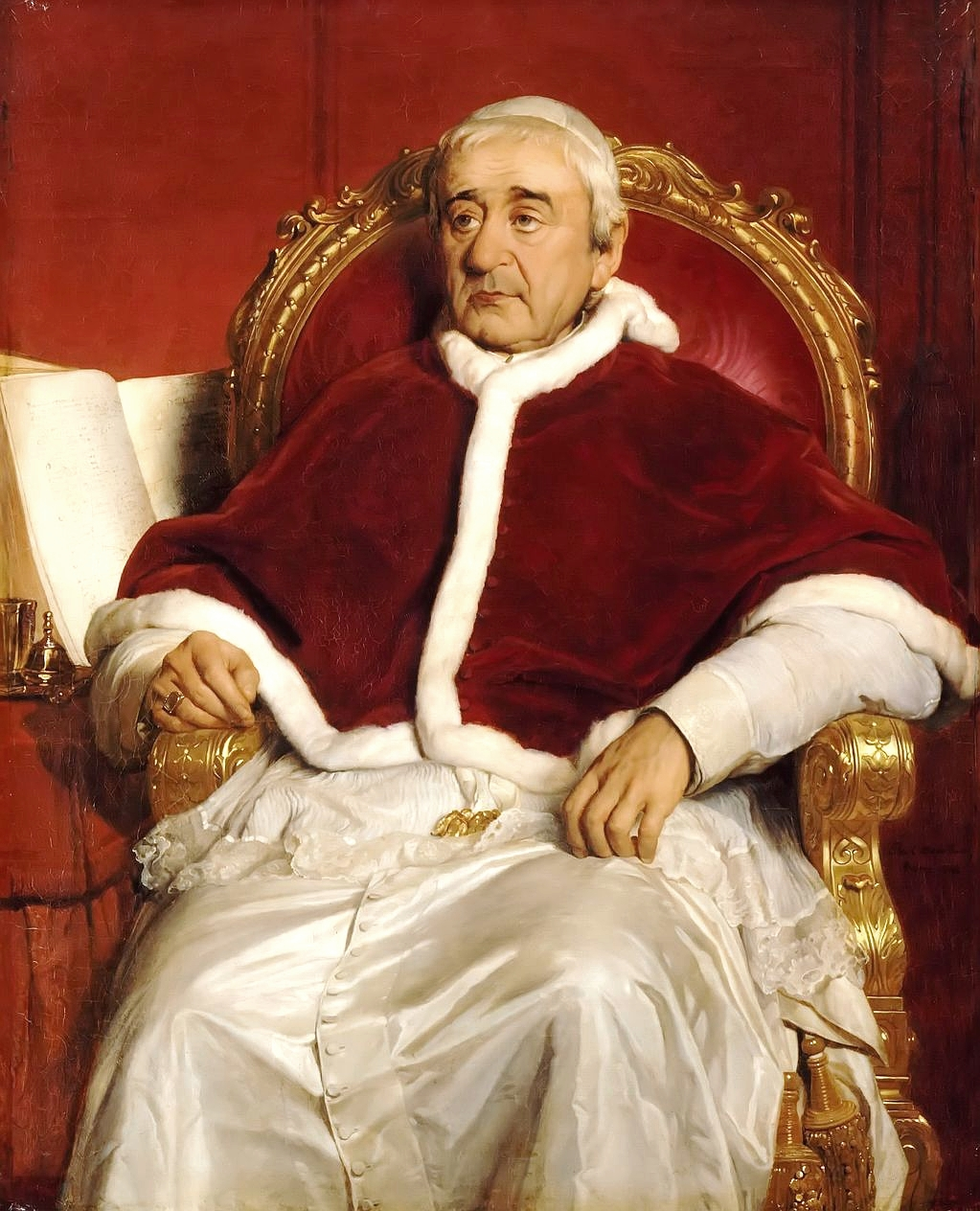

A conclave was held from 14 December 1830 to 2 February 1831 to elect a new pope to succeed Pius VIII, who had died on 30 November. Of the 45 members of the College of Cardinals, all but nine attended. (Note: The current 80-year-old age limit for cardinal electors was introduced by Pope Paul VI in 1970.) On the 83rd ballot, the conclave elected Cardinal Bartolomeo Cappellari, the prefect of the Congregation for the Propagation of the Faith. After accepting his election, he took the name Gregory XVI.

== Background ==
Pope Pius VIII died on Thursday, 30 November 1830, at the age of sixty-nine. On 11 December, Monsignor Benedetto Cappelletti, the governor of Rome, informed the cardinals that there was a conspiracy in Rome involving the Bonaparte nephews of Cardinal Joseph Fesch. One in custody had been released to the Russian minister, since his mother was the Russian-born Catharina of Württemberg. Fesch refused to ask his nephews to leave Rome. A paper bomb exploded under the windows of the conclave. The conclave thus opened in an atmosphere of high tension.

== Description ==
When the conclave convened on 14 December, some 45 of the 54 living cardinals participated; eight of whom were not Italian. Bartolomeo Pacca presided as dean of the College of Cardinals.

Initially the chief candidates included Emmanuele De Gregorio and Bartolomeo Pacca, who had been papabili in the 1829 conclave, plus Giacomo Giustiniani, who was a long-serving papal diplomat but who was vetoed by King Ferdinand VII. Giustiniani had served as nuncio at Madrid and provoked the hostility of the prime minister in ecclesiastical matters, and Queen Christina regarding the succession.

From the first day of the scrutiny, which was the 15th, up to the 27th, the votes were fairly evenly divided between De Gregorio and Pacca. However, it became clear eventually that neither of the unvetoed papabili could gain the support of two-thirds of the cardinals, and with Prince Klemens Wenzel von Metternich wanting a very strong pope to hold firm against the flood of revolution haunting Europe at the time of the conclave, Giuseppe Albani, who led the Austrian faction and supported Pacca, intervened. He proposed Vincenzo Macchi, former nuncio in Paris, as his candidate, but few of the other cardinals saw Macchi as suitable for the papacy. Cardinal Joachim-Jean-Xavier d'Isoard was instructed by King Louis-Philippe of France to place a veto against the election of Macchi if necessary. Cardinal Tommaso Bernetti, who vied with Albani for the position of secretary of state, threw his support to De Gregorio.

Cappellari appeared as an alternative to both De Gregorio and Macchi only when the conclave was well-advanced, but even though Albani worked against him, Cappellari eventually took the lead and won the election, taking the papal name Gregory XVI.

No conclave since has lasted as long as a week, but at the time no conclave since 1667 had lasted fewer than three weeks. The conclave took eighty-three ballots to deliver a two-thirds majority to a candidate, whereas no conclave since has taken more than fourteen.

Cappellari, then a Camaldolese priest and prefect of the Congregation for the Propagation of the Faith, was also the last pope not a bishop when elected.

Cardinal electors by region
Region	Number
Italy	36
Rest of Europe	9
North America	0
South America	0
Asia	0
Oceania	0
Africa	0
Total	45
