= Quo graviora (1833) =

Quo graviora, or On the Pragmatic Constitution, was the name of a papal brief issued by Pope Gregory XVI on 4 October 1833. It was addressed to the bishops of the Upper Rhineland concerning the movement for reforms in the ecclesiastical province of the Rhineland at that time.
