= 1823 conclave =

Election of Catholic Pope Leo XII

Papal conclave September 1823

Dates and location
- 2–28 September 1823; Quirinal Palace, Papal States

Key officials
- Dean: Giulio Maria della Somaglia
- Sub-dean: Bartolomeo Pacca
- Camerlengo: Bartolomeo Pacca
- Protopriest: Giuseppe Firrao Jr.
- Protodeacon: Fabrizio Ruffo
- Secretary: Raffaele Mazzio

Election
- Electors: 49 (4 absentees)
- Vetoed: Antonio Severoli

Elected pope
- Annibale della Genga; Name taken: Leo XII
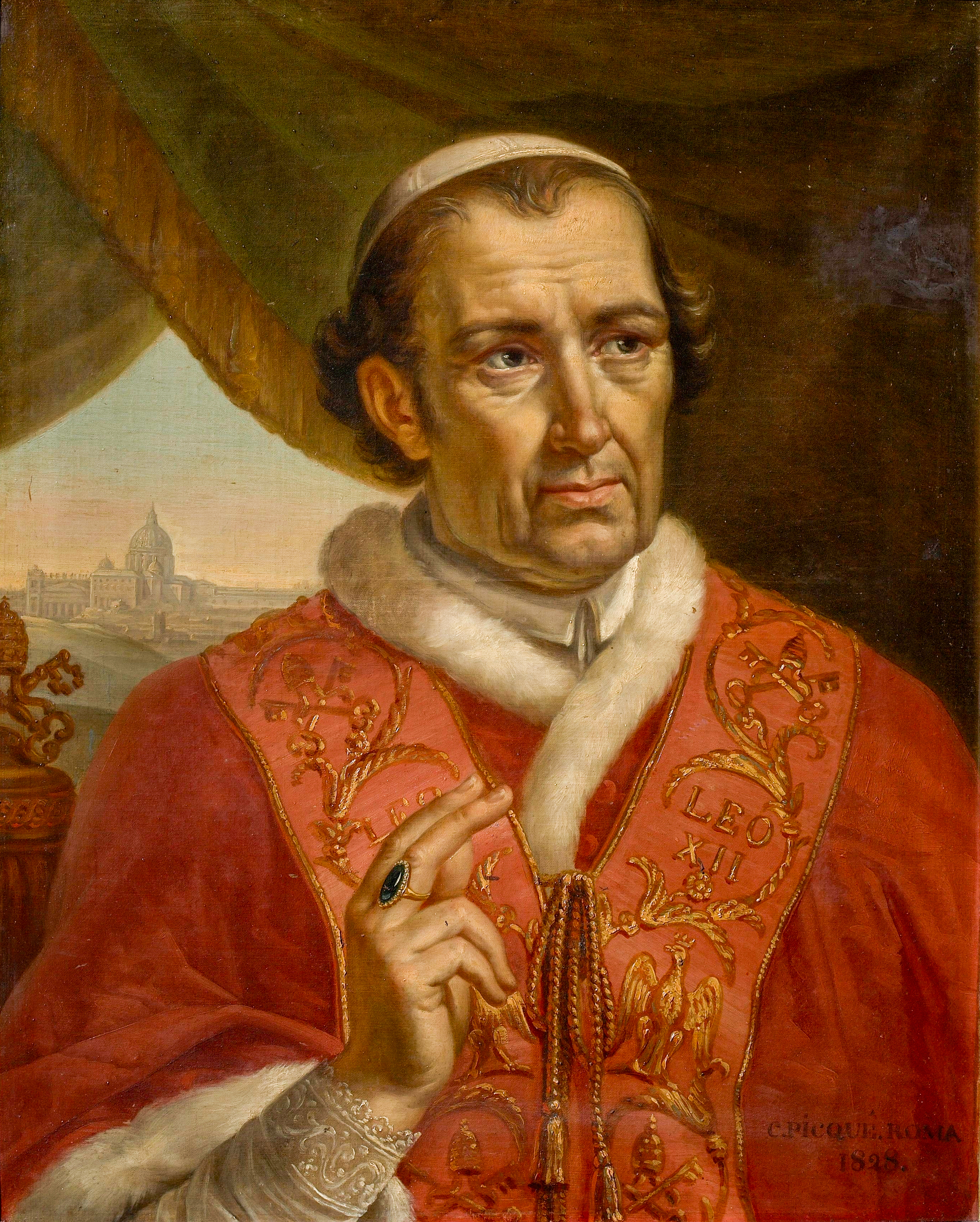

A papal conclave was held from 2 to 28 September 1823 to elect a new pope to succeed Pius VII, who had died on 20 August. Of the 49 members of the College of Cardinals, all but four attended. (Note: The current 80-year-old age limit for cardinal electors was introduced by Pope Paul VI in 1970.) On the final ballot, the conclave elected Cardinal Annibale della Genga, the cardinal vicar of Rome. After accepting his election, he took the name Leo XII.

Pius VII, who had been elected in 1800, had an unusually long pontificate, during which the Catholic Church had faced, in the French Revolution and its aftermath, a severe attack on its power and legitimacy. Pius VII himself had been a prisoner of Napoleon in France for six years.

== Description ==
During Pius VII's papacy, the cardinals had tended to divide into two groups, the zelanti and the politicani. The zelanti were more radically reactionary than the politicani and wanted a highly centralised Church and vehement opposition to the secularising reforms that had resulted in France. The politicani, though anti-liberal, were much more moderate and favoured a conciliatory approach to dealing with the problems that new ideologies and the incipient Industrial Revolution were creating. The leader of this faction was Pius VII's cardinal secretary of state, Ercole Consalvi, but the zelanti wanted a much less moderate pontiff and they set fervently to this task from the time of Pius VII's death.

The length of Pius VII's papacy had a significant influence, because of the forty-nine electors who participated in the conclave, only Giulio Maria della Somaglia and Fabrizio Ruffo were already cardinals when Pius VII was elected in 1800. Forty-seven of the forty-nine electors had had no experience electing a pope.

A number of cardinals were thought at the beginning of the conclave to be possible successors to Pius VII. Cardinal Antonio Severoli was at first seen as the most likely papabile, but the veto from Francis I, Emperor of Austria ruled him out when he seemed to have a reasonable chance.

Francesco Castiglioni then emerged as the most likely candidate. The deceased pope Pius VII had in fact seemingly endorsed Castiglioni by having referred to the latter as Pius VIII, and indeed the candidate who was eventually elected predicted during the conclave that Castiglioni would someday reign under that name (as he did, succeeding the elected Leo in 1829). Castiglioni lost support in the 1823 conclave when the zelanti cardinals came to realize that he was quite close to Consalvi.

Following the decline of Castigioni's support, the experienced Cardinal Della Somaglia then had a turn as a possible candidate, but for some, the mere fact that he had signed his letters as "Citizen Somaglia" during the occupation of the Papal States by Napoleon I of France ruled him out.

It was only then that the eventual winner, Vicar of Rome Annibale della Genga, who was being promoted by the zelanti, began to gather support. Whilst his tall, ascetic look and reactionary reputation was not an attraction for the politicani, the fact that he was seemingly at death's door seemed an attraction for those cardinals by now desperate for a resolution of the conclave. As a result, Della Genga was elected on 28 September and took the papal name Leo XII.

Leo XII was crowned as pope on 5 October 1823.

Cardinal electors by region
Region	Number
Italy	43
Rest of Europe	6
North America	0
South America	0
Asia	0
Oceania	0
Africa	0
Total	49

== See also ==
- Fabrizio Turriozzi

== Sources ==
- Artaud de Montor, Alexis François (1843). Histoire du Pape Léon XII. Paris 1843, I, pp. 26–84. (in French)
- Cipolletta, Eugenio (1863). Memorie politiche sui conclavi da Pio VII a Pio IX, compilate su documenti diplomatici segreti. Milano: Legros e Marazzani 1863, pp. 127–164 [based on Neapolitan documents]. (in Italian)
- Iervese, Marco (2016). "La registrazione dei voti nel Barberiano latino 4662." Sermattei and Regoli, Il conclave e l'elezione di Leone XII Genga, pp. 307–317. (in Italian)
- Sermattei, Ilaria Fiumi; Regoli, Roberto (edd.) (2016). Il conclave e l'elezione di Leone XII Genga, castello, chiesa di San Clemente 31 luglio - 28 agosto 2016. Stampato dal Consiglio Regionale Assemblea legislativa delle Marche. Quaderni del Consiglio Regionale delle Marche, n. 209. Ancona 2016. (in Italian)
