= 1774–1775 conclave =

Election of Catholic Pope Pius VI

Papal conclave 1774–75

Dates and location
- 5 October 1774 – 15 February 1775; Apostolic Palace, Papal States

Key officials
- Dean: Gian Francesco Albani
- Sub-dean: Henry Benedict Stuart
- Camerlengo: Carlo Rezzonico
- Protopriest: Giuseppe Pozzobonelli
- Protodeacon: Alessandro Albani

Election
- Vetoed: Giovanni Carlo Boschi

Elected pope
- Giovanni Braschi; Name taken: Pius VI
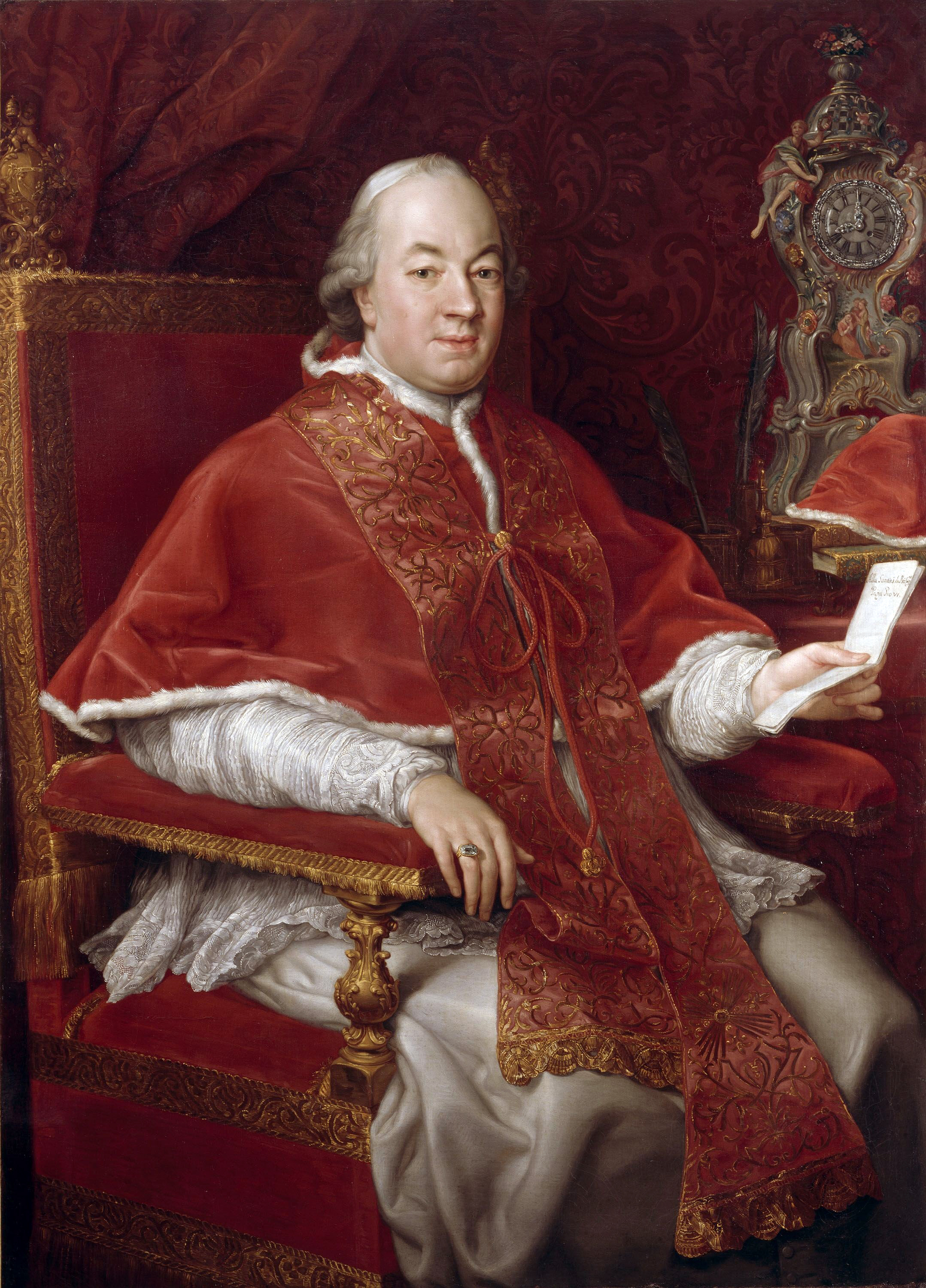

The 1774–75 papal conclave (5 October – 15 February) was convoked after the death of Pope Clement XIV on 22 September 1774 and ended with the election of Cardinal Giovanni Braschi, who took the name Pius VI.

== Death of Pope Clement XIV ==
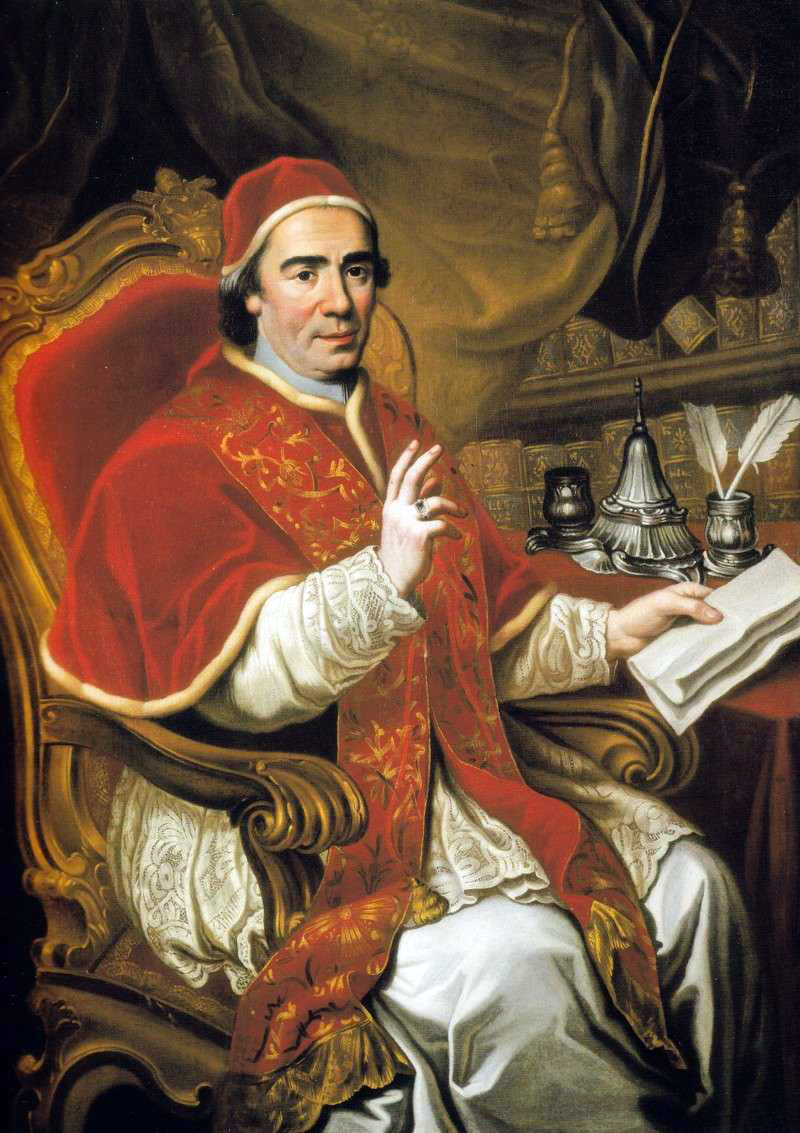
Pope Clement XIV (portrait by Vincenzo Milione, c. 1773–1774)

Pope Clement XIV died suddenly on September 22, 1774, at the age of 68. His pontificate had been dominated by the problem of the Society of Jesus. The various courts under the House of Bourbon and the Kingdom of Portugal (under the House of Braganza) urged the general suppression of the order. The pope tried to defend Jesuits and to temporize, but finally had to capitulate, and in 1773 he issued the Brief Dominus ac Redemptor which suppressed the Society of Jesus. Father Lorenzo Ricci, general of the order, had been imprisoned in the Castel Sant'Angelo. However, the Jesuits still had many adherents in the Roman Curia and in the Sacred College of Cardinals. The attitude toward Jesuits remained the main criterion of the appreciation of the candidates to the papal succession in the subsequent conclave.

The death of a pope frequently presented an opportunity for the citizens of Rome to vent their anti-clerical feelings, often in the context of satires, sometimes salacious, directed at either the late pope or the cardinals. In 1774, the Governor of Rome had occasion to ban a drama entitled the Conclave for offending the "dignity, decorum, and venerable representation of the Sacred College, as well as, other persons as subjects".

== Divisions among the cardinals ==
The College of Cardinals was generally divided into two blocs: curial, pro-Jesuit (zelanti) and political, anti-Jesuit. The first one was formed by the Italian curial cardinals who opposed the secular influences on the Church. The second one included crown-cardinals of the Catholic courts. These two blocs were in no way homogenous. Zelanti were divided into moderate and radical factions. The anti-Jesuit bloc was divided into several national groups with different interests.

The leader of celanti was Cardinal Marcantonio Colonna. The other representatives of this faction were Giovanni Battista Rezzonico, his relative Carlo Rezzonico, who occupied the important office of the camerlengo of the Holy Roman Church, Gian Francesco Albani, dean of the College of Cardinals, and Alessandro Albani, archdeacon of the College. The Rezzonichi represented the radical wing of this faction, while the Albanis and Colonna represented the moderate wing. Among the anti-Jesuit cardinals the main leader was Cardinal de Bernis, ambassador of Louis XVI of France. The interests of Charles III of Spain were represented by Cardona, interests of Ferdinand III of Sicily/Ferdinand IV of Naples by Orsini, while those of Maria Theresa of Austria and her son Joseph II, Holy Roman Emperor were under the care of Migazzi and Corsini. Also very influential was Cardinal Giraud, former nuncio in France. Several cardinals were not counted among the members of these factions.

There was no main favourite of the conclave. About thirty cardinals were considered papabile.

== Beginning of the conclave ==
The conclave began on October 5, 1774. Initially there were only 28 participants. By the middle of December their number reached only 39, but by the end of the conclave five more cardinals arrived.

Cardinal Marcantonio Colonna, taking advantage of the small number of electors, mostly curial cardinals belonging to his zelanti faction, tried to release Father Ricci from prison. This initiative obtained support of camerlengo Carlo Rezzonico and of Henry Benedict Stuart, but the anti-Jesuit faction was strong enough to frustrate it.

Every day at least one ballot took place, but no candidates with serious chances for the election were proposed at the beginning, because the number of electors was relatively small and they were obliged to await the arrival of the rest, particularly of those representatives of the courts who did not reside in Rome. The zelanti voted mainly for their leader Colonna, who received the greatest number of votes in these initial ballots, but certainly had no chances to secure the required majority of two thirds. Some other candidates were also put forward by the Zelanti, but they were all rejected by crown-cardinals as too pro-Jesuit. Against the candidature of Giovanni Carlo Boschi the Bourbon courts even pronounced the official papal veto.

Although the court factions cooperated by blocking the zelanti candidates, they were unable to agree upon one of their own. Spain supported Pallavicino, while Austria favoured Visconti, a former nuncio at Vienna. Towards the end of 1774, the name of young Cardinal Giovanni Angelo Braschi was raised for the first time. Braschi belonged to the moderate wing of the Zelanti faction. He was advanced by Cardinal Giraud, and obtained a significant number of votes. The crown-cardinals rejected Braschi as pro-Jesuit, although Cardinal de Bernis in his report for the French court found him moderate man and did not exclude the support for him in the future, if no better candidate would be found. No consensus had been achieved before the end of 1774.

In January 1775, Cardinals Migazzi, Borromeo, Caracciolo, Pallavicino, and Visconti were proposed by the political factions, but without any significant success, because the zelanti rejected all candidates recommended by the monarchs. Cardinal Zelada tried to mediate between factions, proposing to reduce the number of candidates to six, of whom each of the two blocs had to advance three, and to elect the one who would be the most acceptable for all. But this initiative had also failed.

Coat of arms of Pius VI.

Gradually, French Cardinals de Bernis and Luynes came to the conclusion that it was impossible to find any better candidate with chances for election than the initially rejected Cardinal Braschi. This was the turning point of the conclave. Braschi's candidacy gained important and influential allies. But Spain and Portugal still opposed him as too favorable toward the Jesuits. Braschi also had some opponents in the radical wing of his own party. To secure the required majority, Cardinal de Bernis aligned himself with Cardinal Zelada, who acted as mediator: de Bernis had to convince the political factions, while Zelada had to overcome the opposition among the radical Zelanti. Also Cardinal Albani was engaged in the promotion of Braschi.

Cardinal Zelada secured the support of aelanti without serious problems. Spain's candidate, Pallavicino, openly declared that he would not accept the tiara and supported Braschi. The other political factions agreed when Braschi promised the ratification of the suppression of the Jesuits, his friendship to the House of Bourbon and to the House of Habsburg, and agreed to be guided by the allies in the distribution of State offices.

== Election of Pope Pius VI ==
On 15 February 1775, after 134 days of deliberation, Cardinal Giovanni Braschi was elected to the papacy on the 265th ballot, receiving all votes except his own, which, according to custom, he gave to Gian Francesco Albani, the dean of the Sacred College of Cardinals. He took the name of Pius VI, in honour of St. Pius V.

On 22 February 1775, the pope-elect was consecrated bishop of Rome by Dean Gian Francesco Albani, Bishop of Porto e Santa Rufina, assisted by Vice-Dean Henry Benedict Stuart, Bishop of Frascati, and Camerlengo Carlo Rezzonico, Bishop of Sabina. On the same day, he was also solemnly crowned by Cardinal Alessandro Albani, protodeacon of S. Maria in Via Lata.

== List of cardinal electors ==
=== List of participants ===
At the death of Clement XIV, there were fifty-five cardinals in the Sacred College, but two of them died during sede vacante, while another nine remained entirely absent. Forty-four cardinals participated in the conclave:

- Gian Francesco Albani (created cardinal on April 10, 1747) – Cardinal-Bishop of Porto e Santa Rufina; Dean of the Sacred College of Cardinals; prefect of the S.C. of Ceremonies; Cardinal-protector of the Kingdom of Poland
- Henry Benedict Stuart (July 3, 1747) – Cardinal-Bishop of Frascati; commendatario of S. Lorenzo in Damaso; Sub-dean of the Sacred College of Cardinals; Vice-Chancellor of the Holy Roman Church; archpriest of the patriarchal Vatican Basilica; known as the Cardinal Duke of York due to his father James Francis Edward Stuart being the Jacobite claimant to the English, Scottish and Irish thrones.
- Fabrizio Serbelloni (November 26, 1753) – Cardinal-Bishop of Ostia e Velletri
- Carlo Rezzonico (September 11, 1758) – Cardinal-Bishop of Sabina; commendatario of S. Marco; Camerlengo of the Holy Roman Church
- François-Joachim de Pierre de Bernis (October 2, 1758) – Cardinal-Bishop of Albano; Cardinal-protector and ambassador of the Kingdom of France before the Holy See; administrator of the see of Albi
- Carlo Vittorio Amedeo delle Lanze (April 10, 1747) – Cardinal-Priest of S. Prassede
- Vincenzo Malvezzi (November 26, 1753) – Cardinal-Priest of SS. Marcellino e Pietro; archbishop of Bologna; Pro-Datary of His Holiness
- Antonino Sersale (April 22, 1754) – Cardinal-Priest of S. Pudenziana; archbishop of Naples
- Francisco de Solís Folch de Cardona (April 5, 1756) – Cardinal-Priest of SS. XII Apostoli; archbishop of Seville; Cardinal-protector of the Kingdom of Spain
- Paul d'Albert de Luynes (April 5, 1756) – Cardinal-Priest of S. Tommaso in Parione; archbishop of Sens
- Girolamo Spinola (September 24, 1759) – Cardinal-Priest of S. Balbina
- Giuseppe Maria Castelli (September 24, 1759) – Cardinal-Priest of S. Alessio; prefect of the S.C. for the Propagation of Faith
- Gaetano Fantuzzi (September 24, 1759) – Cardinal-Priest of S. Pietro in Vincoli; prefect of the S.C. of the Ecclesiestical Immunities
- Marcantonio Colonna (September 24, 1759) – Cardinal-Priest of S. Maria della Pace; Vicar General of Rome; prefect of the S.C. of the Residence of Bishops; archpriest of the patriarchal Liberian Basilica
- Andrea Corsini (September 24, 1759) – Cardinal-Priest of S. Mateo in Via Merulana; prefect of the Supreme Tribunal of the Apostolic Signature of Justice
- Christoph Anton von Migazzi von Waal und Sonnenthurn (November 23, 1761) – Cardinal-Priest [no title assigned]; archbishop of Vienna; administrator of the see of Vác
- Simone Buonaccorsi (July 18, 1763) – Cardinal-Priest of S. Giovanni a Porta Latina
- Giovanni Ottavio Bufalini (July 21, 1766) – Cardinal-Priest of S. Maria degli Angeli; archbishop of Ancona
- Giovanni Carlo Boschi (July 21, 1766) – Cardinal-Priest of SS. Giovanni e Paolo; Grand penitentiary; prefect of the Congregation for the correction of the books of the Oriental Church
- Ludovico Calini (September 26, 1766) – Cardinal-Priest of S. Stefano al Monte Celio; prefect of the S.C. of the Indulgences and the Sacred Relics; Camerlengo of the Sacred College of Cardinals
- Antonio Branciforte Colonna (September 26, 1766) – Cardinal-Priest of S. Maria in Via; legate in Bologna
- Lazzaro Opizio Pallavicino (September 26, 1766) – Cardinal-Priest of SS. Nereo ed Achilleo; Cardinal Secretary of State
- Vitaliano Borromeo (September 26, 1766) – Cardinal-Priest of S. Maria in Aracoeli; legate in Romagna
- Pietro Colonna Pamphili (September 26, 1766) – Cardinal-Priest of S. Maria in Trastevere
- Urbano Paracciani Rutili (September 26, 1766) – Cardinal-Priest of S. Callisto; archbishop of Fermo
- Mario Marefoschi Compagnoni (January 29, 1770) – Cardinal-Priest of S. Agostino; prefect of the S.C. of Rites; archpriest of the patriarchal Lateran Basilica
- Scipione Borghese (September 10, 1770) – Cardinal-Priest of S. Maria sopra Minerva; legate in Ferrara; Cardinal-protector of Germany
- Antonio Eugenio Visconti (June 17, 1771) – Cardinal-Priest of [no title assigned]
- Bernardino Giraud (June 17, 1771) – Cardinal-Priest of SS. Trinita al Monte Pincio; archbishop of Ferrara
- Innocenzo Conti (September 23, 1771) – Cardinal-Priest [no title assigned]
- Gennaro Antonio de Simone (March 15, 1773) – Cardinal-Priest of S. Bernardo alle Terme
- Francesco Carafa di Traetto (April 19, 1773) – Cardinal-Priest of S. Clemente
- Francesco Saverio de Zelada (April 19, 1773) – Cardinal-Priest of S. Martino ai Monti
- Giovanni Braschi (April 26, 1773) – Cardinal-Priest of S. Onofrio; commendatory abbot of Subiaco
- Alessandro Albani (July 16, 1721) – Cardinal-Deacon of S. Maria in Via Lata; commendatario of S. Maria in Cosmedin; protodeacon of the Sacred College of Cardinals; Librarian of the Holy Roman Church; Cardinal-protector of Austria and Kingdom of Sardinia
- Domenico Orsini d'Aragona (September 9, 1743) – Cardinal-Deacon of S. Maria ad Martyres; Cardinal-protector of the Kingdom of Naples
- Luigi Maria Torregiani (November 26, 1753) – Cardinal-Deacon of S. Agata in Suburra
- Giovanni Costanzio Caracciolo (September 24, 1759) – Cardinal-Deacon of S. Eustachio; prefect of the Apostolic Tribunal of the Signature of Grace
- Andrea Negroni (July 18, 1763) – Cardinal-Deacon of SS. Vito e Modesto; secretary of the Apostolic Briefs
- Benedetto Veterani (September 26, 1766) – Cardinal-Deacon of SS. Cosma e Damiano; prefect of the S.C. of Index
- Giovanni Battista Rezzonico (September 10, 1770) – Cardinal-Deacon of S. Nicola in Carcere Tulliano
- Antonio Casali (December 12, 1770) – Cardinal-Deacon of S. Giorgio in Velabro; prefect of the S.C. of Good Government
- Pasquale Acquaviva d'Aragona (December 12, 1770) – Cardinal-Deacon of S. Maria in Aquiro; pro-president of Urbino
- Francesco D'Elci (April 26, 1773) – Cardinal-Deacon of S. Angelo in Pescheria

Thirteen cardinals were created by Clement XIV, twenty by Clement XIII, ten by Benedict XIV, and one (Alessandro Albani) by Innocent XIII.

All of the cardinals were Italian, except for two Spaniards (Francesco Saverio de Zelada and Francisco de Solís y Folch de Cardona), one Austrian (Christoph Bartholomäus Anton Migazzi), one French (Paul d'Albert) and one British/Irish (Henry Benedict Stuart) .

=== List of absentees ===
Nine cardinals were absent:

- Giuseppe Pozzobonelli (September 9, 1743) – Cardinal-Priest of S. Lorenzo in Lucina; protopriest of the Sacred College of Cardinals; archbishop of Milan
- Franz Konrad Kasimir Ignaz von Rodt (April 5, 1756) – Cardinal-Priest of S. Maria del Popolo; bishop of Constance
- Francisco de Saldanha da Gama (April 5, 1756) – Cardinal-Deacon [no deaconry assigned]; patriarch of Lisbon
- Buenaventura de Córdoba Espínola de la Cerda (November 23, 1761) – Cardinal-Priest of S. Lorenzo in Panisperna; patriarch of the West Indies; Vicar General of the Spanish Army and Fleet
- Jean-François-Joseph Rochechouart (November 23, 1761) – Cardinal-Priest of S. Eusebio; bishop of Laon
- Louis-César-Constantine de Rohan-Guéménée (November 23, 1761) – Cardinal-Priest [no title assigned]; bishop of Strasbourg
- João Cosme da Cunha, C.R.S.A. (August 6, 1770) – Cardinal-Priest [no title assigned]; archbishop of Evora; Inquisitor General of the Portuguese Inquisition
- Charles-Antoine de La Roche-Aymon (December 16, 1771) – Cardinal-Priest [no title assigned]; archbishop of Reims
- Leopold Ernest von Firmian (December 14, 1772) – Cardinal-Priest [no title assigned]; bishop of Passau

Benedict XIV, Clement XIII, and Clement XIV created three of them each.

=== Died during sede vacante ===
Two cardinals, including one created by Benedict XIV and one created by Clement XIII:

- Giovanni Francesco Stoppani (November 26, 1753) – Cardinal-Bishop of Palestrina; Secretary of the Supreme S.C. of the Roman and Universal Inquisition (died on November 18, 1774, at Rome)
- Ferdinando Maria de Rossi (September 24, 1759) – Cardinal-Priest of S. Cecilia; prefect of the S.C. of the Tridentine Council (died on February 4, 1775, at Rome)

== Sources ==
- Jean-François Bourgoing, Historical and Philosophical Memoirs of Pius the Sixth and of His Pontificate, 1799
- S. Miranda: List of participants of the conclave, 1774–75
- Damian Hungs: Papst Pius VI
- Valérie Pirie The Triple Crown: An Account of the Papal Conclaves
- Kazimierz Dopierała, Księga papieży, Pallotinum, Poznań 1996
