= Cardinals created by Clement XIII =

Catholic appointments from 1758 to 1766

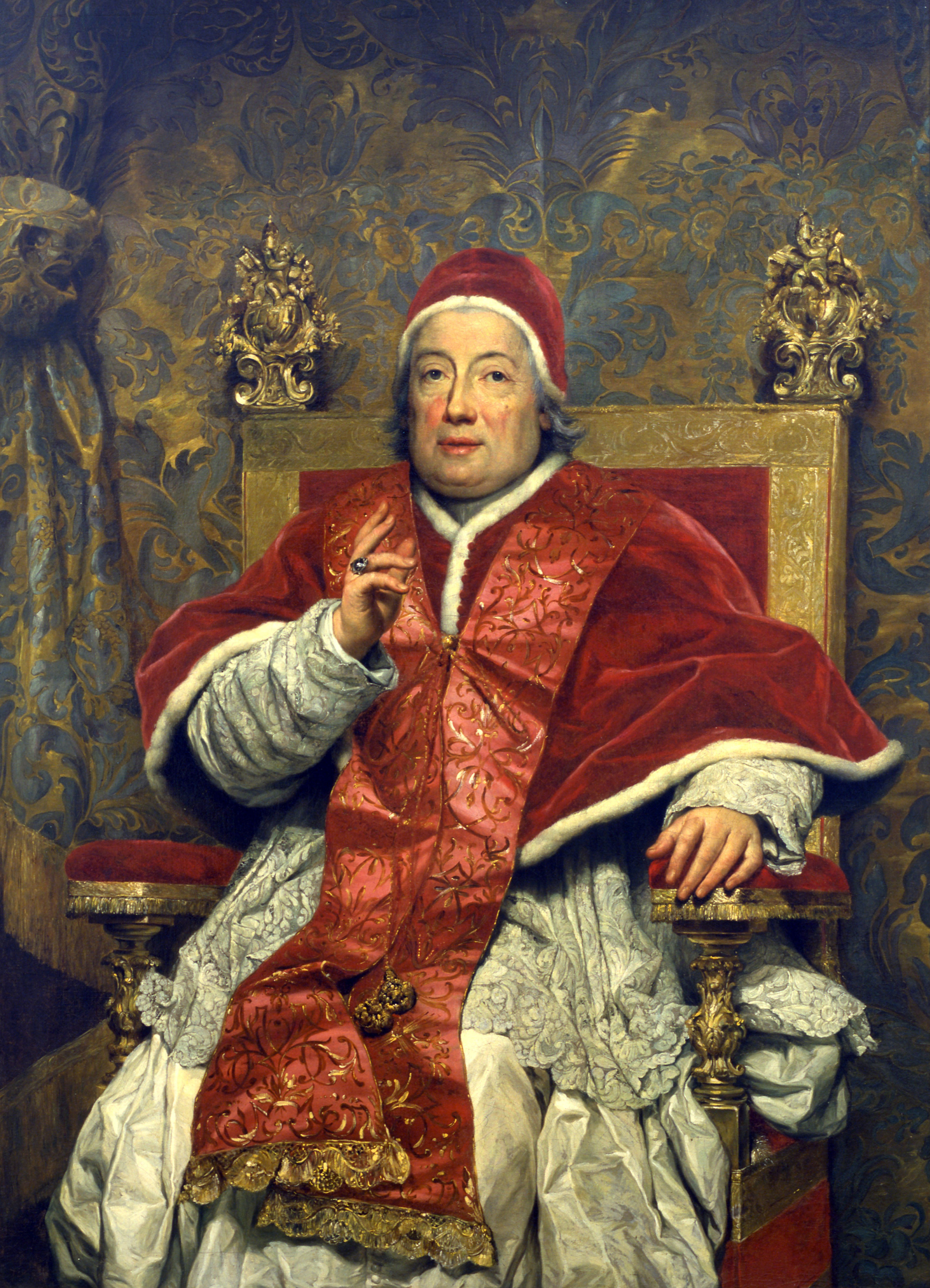
Pope Clement XIII (1693–1769).

Pope Clement XIII (r. 1758–1769) created 52 cardinals in seven consistories.

== 11 September 1758 ==
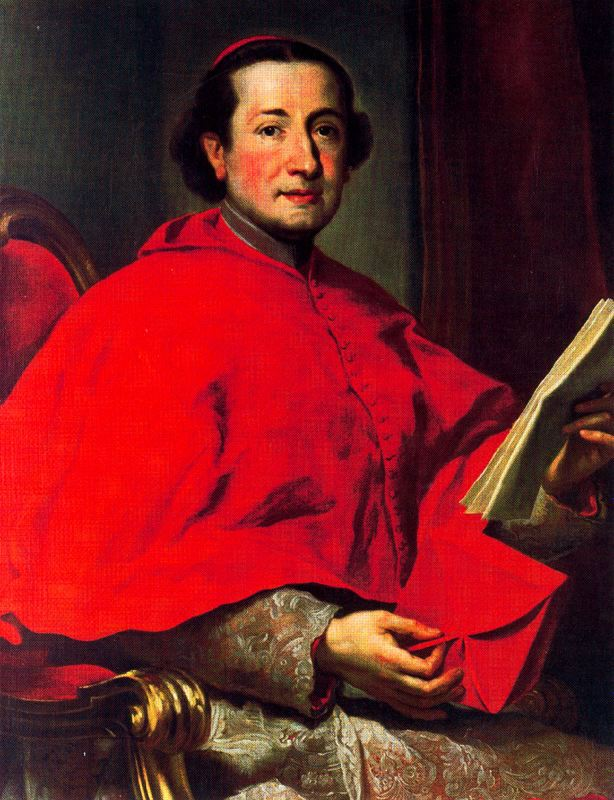
Carlo Rezzonico (1724–99), made a cardinal on September 11, 1758.

1. Carlo Rezzonico

== 2 October 1758 ==
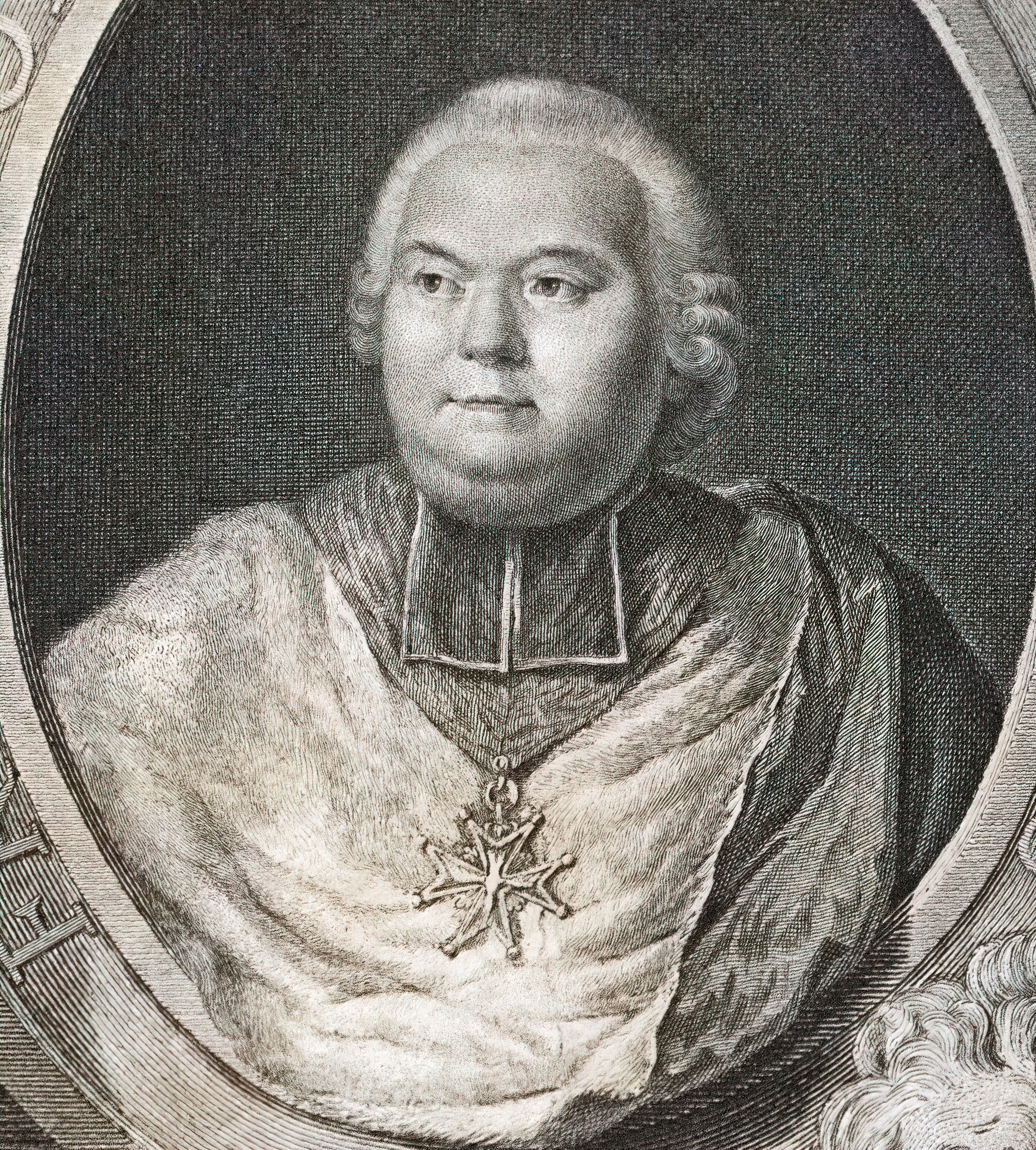
François-Joachim de Pierre de Bernis (1715–94), made a cardinal on October 2, 1758.

1. Antonio Marino Priuli
2. François-Joachim de Pierre de Bernis

== 24 September 1759 ==
Giuseppe Alessandro Furietti (1685–1764), made a cardinal on September 24, 1759.

1. Ferdinando Maria de Rossi
2. Ignazio Michele Crivelli
3. Ludovico Merlini
4. Filippo Acciaioli
5. Luigi Gualterio
6. Girolamo Spinola
7. Antonio Maria Erba-Odescalchi
8. Sante Veronese
9. Ludovico Valenti
10. Giuseppe Maria Castelli
11. Pietro Francesco Bussi
12. Gaetano Fantuzzi
13. Giuseppe Agostino Orsi
14. Pietro Girolamo Guglielmi
15. Giuseppe Alessandro Furietti
16. Pietro Paolo Conti
17. Nicolò Maria Antonelli
18. Lorenzo Ganganelli
19. Giovanni Costanzio Caracciolo
20. Niccolò Perelli
21. Marcantonio Colonna
22. Andrea Corsini

== 23 November 1761 ==
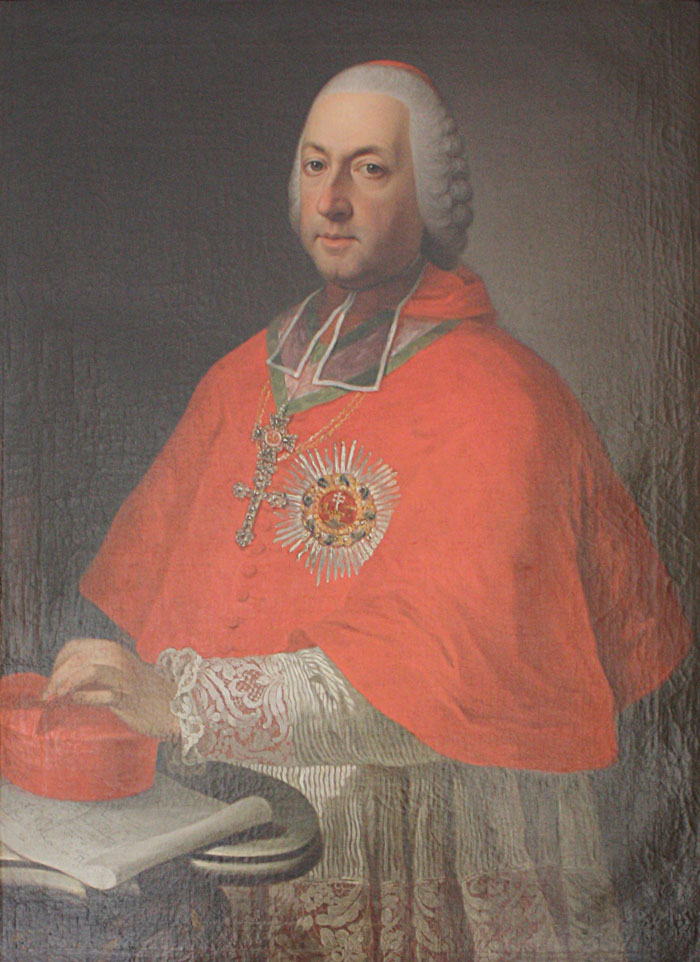
Christoph Anton Migazzi (1714–1803), made a cardinal on November 23, 1761.

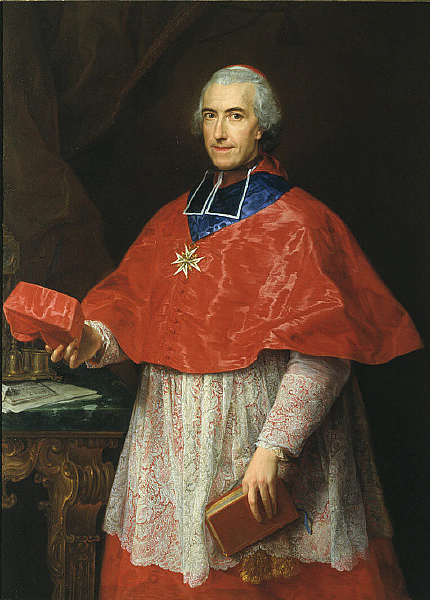
Jean-François-Joseph de Rochechouart (1708–77), made a cardinal on November 23, 1761.

1. Buenaventura de Córdoba Espínola de la Cerda
2. Christoph Anton Migazzi
3. Antoine Clériadus de Choiseul-Beaupré
4. Jean-François-Joseph de Rochechouart
5. Franz Christoph von Hutten
6. Enrichetto Virginio Natta
7. Giovanni Molin
8. Louis Constantin de Rohan
9. Baldassare Cenci (iuniore)
10. Cornelio Caprara

== 18 July 1763 ==
1. Simone Buonaccorsi
2. Andrea Negroni

== 21 July 1766 ==
1. Giovanni Ottavio Bufalini
2. Giovanni Carlo Boschi

== 26 September 1766 ==
1. Ludovico Calini
2. Niccolò Serra
3. Niccolò Oddi
4. Antonio Branciforte Colonna
5. Lazzaro Opizio Pallavicini
6. Vitaliano Borromeo
7. Pietro Colonna Pamphili
8. Giuseppe Simonetti
9. Urbano Paracciani
10. Filippo Maria Pirelli
11. Enea Silvio Piccolomini
12. Saverio Canale
13. Benedetto Veterani
