= Giuseppe Pozzobonelli =

Archbishop of Milan (1696–1783)

His Eminence Giuseppe Pozzobonelli
- Cardinal, Archbishop of Milan
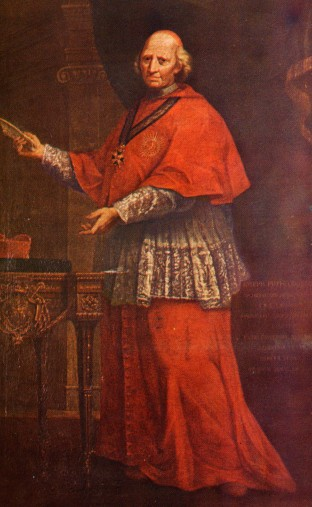
- Church: Catholic Church
- See: Milan
- Appointed: 15 July 1743
- Term ended: 27 April 1783
- Predecessor: Carlo Gaetano Stampa
- Successor: Filippo Maria Visconti
- Other post: Cardinal Priest of San Lorenzo in Lucina

Orders
- Ordination: 23 Dec 1730 (Priest)
- Consecration: 21 July 1743 (Bishop) by Pope Benedict XIV
- Created cardinal: 9 September 1743

Personal details
- Born: 11 August 1696 Milan
- Died: 27 April 1783 (aged 86) Milan
- Buried: Cathedral of Milan
- Coat of arms

Giuseppe II Pozzobonelli (or Puteobonellus, 1696–1783) was an Italian Cardinal and the Archbishop of Milan from 1743 to 1783.

== Early life ==
Giuseppe Pozzobonelli was born on 11 August 1696 in Milan, which at the time was part of Duchy of Milan. Pozzobonelli was the son of a noble family, and lost his mother during childhood. He was educated by the Jesuits and on 5 January 1722, he earned a doctorate in utroque iure at the University of Pavia.

On 23 December 1730, Giuseppe Pozzobonelli was ordained priest for the Archdiocese of Milan by Cardinal Benedetto Erba Odescalchi, who was his spiritual father. He joined the teaching staff of the seminary of his archdiocese. In 1734, he was named conservator of the Biblioteca Ambrosiana. Later, he was named vicar of the archbishop for the nuns of the town. At the death of Archbishop Carlo Gaetano Stampa on 23 December 1742, he was elected vicar capitular of the Archdiocese.

== Archbishop of Milan ==
In July 1743, Pope Benedict XIV named him archbishop of Milan, and on 21 July 1743, he was consecrated bishop by the pope himself in San Carlo al Corso, Rome. However, he could formally take possession of Milan's diocese only eleven months later, on 21 June 1744, due to the late assent from Maria Theresa of Austria.

In the meantime, on 9 September 1743, he was appointed Cardinal Priest with the title of Santa Maria in Via. He kept such title until 2 August 1758, when he moved to the title of Santa Maria sopra Minerva, and again on 28 May 1770, he moved to the title of San Lorenzo in Lucina.

Giuseppe Pozzobonelli took very seriously his service as bishop: he made pastoral visits to almost all areas of his large diocese, he often preached and personally conferred the sacraments. He paid particular attention to the instruction and to the morality of the clergy. He celebrated a Jubilee in 1751 whose main event was the translation of the body of Saint Charles Borromeo among the streets of the town. He supported the idea to place a statue of Virgin Mary atop Milan Cathedral (now known as the Madonnina), which was so erected in 1774 and became a reference point for the people of Milan.

During his tenure as archbishop, he kept good relations with the Habsburg authorities and he give his support to the former Jesuits after the Jesuit suppression. However, starting from 1767, some contrasts arose with the Habsburgs due to some ecclesiastic reforms decided by the government. Due to these rifts and to his poor health, on 19 March 1769, Pozzobonelli tendered his resignation, but Pope Clement XIII refused to free him from his duties as archbishop of Milan.

Pozzobonelli participated to the Conclave of 1758 and to the Papal conclave, 1769, where was believed to be a papabile. He didn't participated to the following conclave for health reasons.

Giuseppe Pozzobonelli died in Milan on 27 April 1783, and his remains were buried in the North nave of the Cathedral of Milan.
