= Giovanni Battista Rezzonico =

Italian cardinal

- Cardinal-Deacon of San Nicola in Carcere
- Church: Catholic Church
- See: San Nicola in Carcere
- In office: 12 December 1770 – 21 July 1783
- Predecessor: Domenico Orsini d'Aragona
- Successor: Romoaldo Braschi-Onesti

Orders
- Created cardinal: 10 September 1770 by Pope Clement XIV

Personal details
- Born: 1 June 1740 Venice, Republic of Venice
- Died: 21 July 1783 (aged 43)

Giovanni Battista Rezzonico (1 June 1740 – 21 July 1785) was an Italian cardinal of the Catholic Church.

== Life ==
He was born in Venice, Republic of Venice, son of Aurelio Rezzonico, 3rd Baron of the Holy Roman Empire (Venice, 12 January 1692 - 1759), and wife (1721) Anna Giustiniani (1702? - ?). His four siblings included Quintilia Rezzonico, wife in 1741 of Ludovico Widmann (1719 - 1763), with issue (including Carlo Aurelio Widmann), Cardinal Carlo Rezzonico and Abbondio Rezzonico. He was the nephew of Pope Clement XIII (Carlo della Torre di Rezzonico or Carlo Rezzonico Senior) (1602–1680). His brother Carlo (1724–1799) was also a cardinal and Camerlengo of the Sacred College of Cardinals from 1769 to 1799.

On 10 September 1770, he was named a cardinal by Clement XIV and installed on 12 December 1770. He died as Cardinal-Deacon of San Nicola in Carcere. He participated in the 1774–1775 papal conclave.

In the 1760s, he engaged Giovanni Battista Piranesi to enhance the structure of Rome's Santa Maria del Priorato Church and its plaza, providing both with new decoration.
