= Giovanni Carlo Boschi =

Italian clergyman

His Eminence Giovanni Carlo Boschi
- Major Penitentiary of the Apostolic Penitentiary
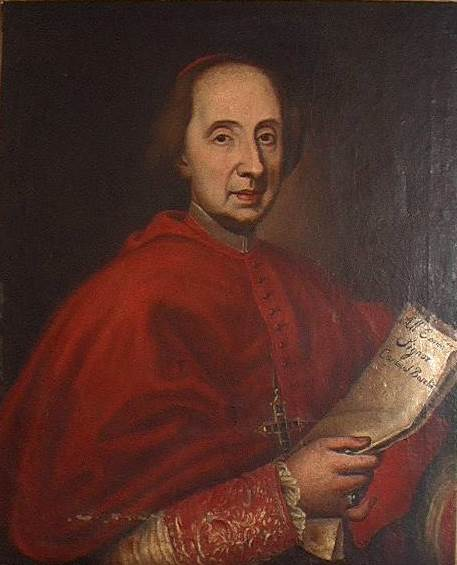
- Portrait.
- Church: Roman Catholic Church
- Appointed: 1 September 1767
- Term ended: 6 September 1788
- Predecessor: Antonio Andrea Galli
- Successor: Francesco Saverio de Zelada
- Other post: Cardinal-Priest of San Lorenzo in Lucina (1784-88)
- Previous posts: Master of the Apostolic Palaces (1759–66); Titular Archbishop of Athenæ (1760–66); Cardinal-Priest of Santi Giovanni e Paolo (1766–84); Camerlengo of the College of Cardinals (1773–74)

Orders
- Ordination: 5 March 1746
- Consecration: 5 October 1760 by Pope Clement XIII
- Created cardinal: 21 July 1766 by Pope Clement XIII
- Rank: Cardinal-Priest

Personal details
- Born: Giovanni Carlo Boschi; 9 April 1715 Faenza, Papal States
- Died: 6 September 1788 (aged 73) Rome, Papal States
- Education: Collegio Clementino; Pontifical Academy of Ecclesiastical Nobles; La Sapienza

Giovanni Carlo Boschi (Faenza, 9 April 1715 – 6 September 1788) was an Italian clergyman who was made a cardinal by Pope Clement XIII in the consistory of 21 July 1766.

He then served as Major Penitentiary from 1767 to 1788, and participated in the papal conclaves of 1769. He also attend the 1774–75. In the latter, the jus exclusivae was used on behalf of the Bourbons to veto his election to the papacy. His other offices included prefect of the Congregation for the correction of the books of the Oriental Church.
