= Carlo Vittorio Amedeo delle Lanze =

Italian Roman Catholic cardinal

Styles of Carlo Vittorio Amedeo delle Lanzr
- Reference style: His Eminence
- Spoken style: Your Eminence
- Informal style: Cardinal
- See: Ss Cosma and Damiano

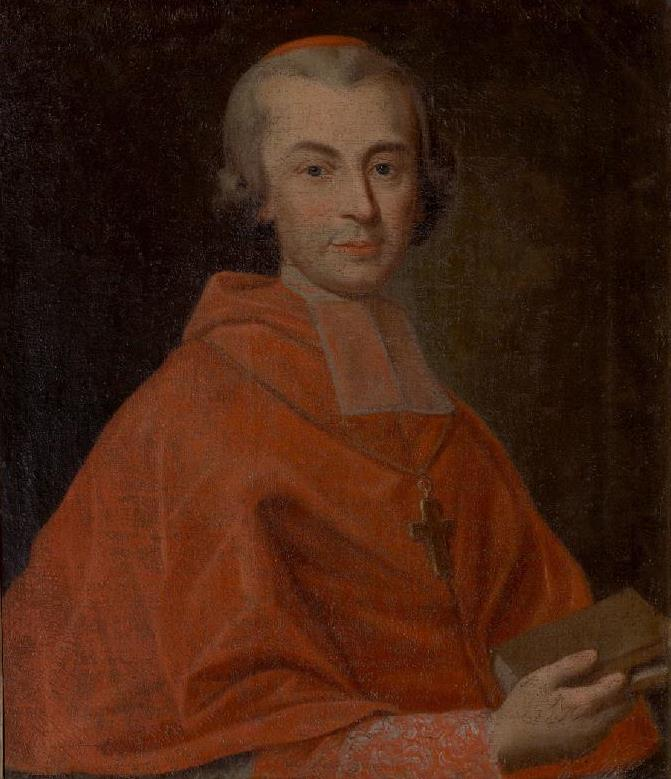
Cardinal Carlo Vittorio Amedeo Ignazio delle Lanze.

Carlo Vittorio Amedeo Delle Lanze (1712–1784) was an Italian clergyman, a Roman Catholic cardinal. In his youth, Delle Lanze was supposed to be close to Jansenism, but in his late life he was a supporter of the Jesuits and part of the zelanti.

== Biography ==
He was born in 1712, the son of Carlo Francesco Agostino, conte di Sale e di Vinovo, the illegitimate son of Charles Emmanuel II of Savoy. In his youth, he became a soldier and started a military career in the army of the Kingdom of Sardinia, but in 1730 he decided to follow the ecclesiastic career, studying at the Pontifical Ecclesiastical Academy.

Ordained as priest in 1736, he did his pastoral work in Turin as spiritual assistant of young people and university students. In 1743, he was named commendatory abbot of San Giusto di Susa, and then of the Lucedio Abbey. In 1747, he was named cardinal and archbishop of Nicosia; two years later, he received the commenda of the Abbey of Fruttuaria in northern Piedmont. He presided over the marriage between Victor Amadeus III of Savoy and Maria Antonia Ferdinanda of Spain. In 1775, he was named secretary of the Congregation of the Council.

He died in the Abbey of Fruttuaria and was buried there.

=== Papal elections ===
As a cardinal, Delle Lanze participated in 3 conclaves: 1758, 1769 and 1774. During the conclave of 1774, Delle Lanze was one of the pro-Jesuit cardinals, and in the first ballots he received the highest number of votes on 25 October, but, due to the opposition of the cardinals with strong ties with the European monarchies, he was not elected as pope.
