= Louis Constantin de Rohan =

French prelate

His Eminence Louis-César-Constantin de Rohan COHS
- Cardinal, Prince-Bishop of Strasbourg
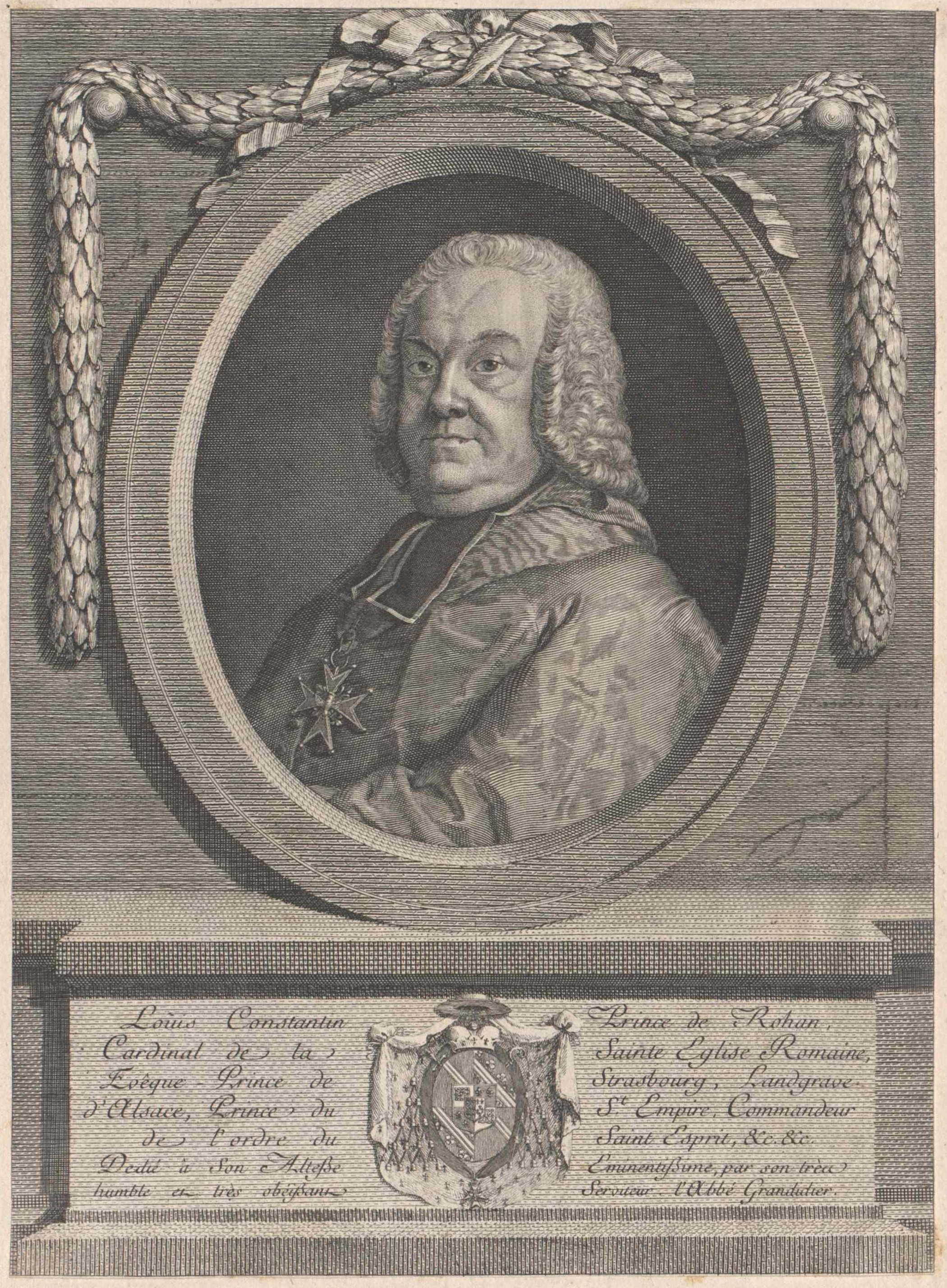
- Diocese: Diocese of Strasbourg
- See: Strasbourg Cathedral
- Installed: 23 September 1756
- Term ended: 11 March 1779
- Predecessor: Armand de Rohan-Soubise
- Successor: Louis René Édouard de Rohan-Guéméné

Orders
- Consecration: March 16, 1757 by Frédéric de La Rochefoucauld
- Created cardinal: 23 November 1761 by Pope Clement XIII
- Rank: Cardinal of the Catholic Church

Personal details
- Born: 24 March 1697 Paris, Kingdom of France
- Died: 11 March 1779 (aged 81) Paris, Kingdom of France
- Parents: Charles III de Rohan; Charlotte-Elisabeth de Cochefilet
- Coat of arms

Louis César Constantin de Rohan (24 March 1697, Paris – 11 March 1779, Paris) was a French prelate of the House of Rohan.

== Biography ==
=== Origin and youth ===
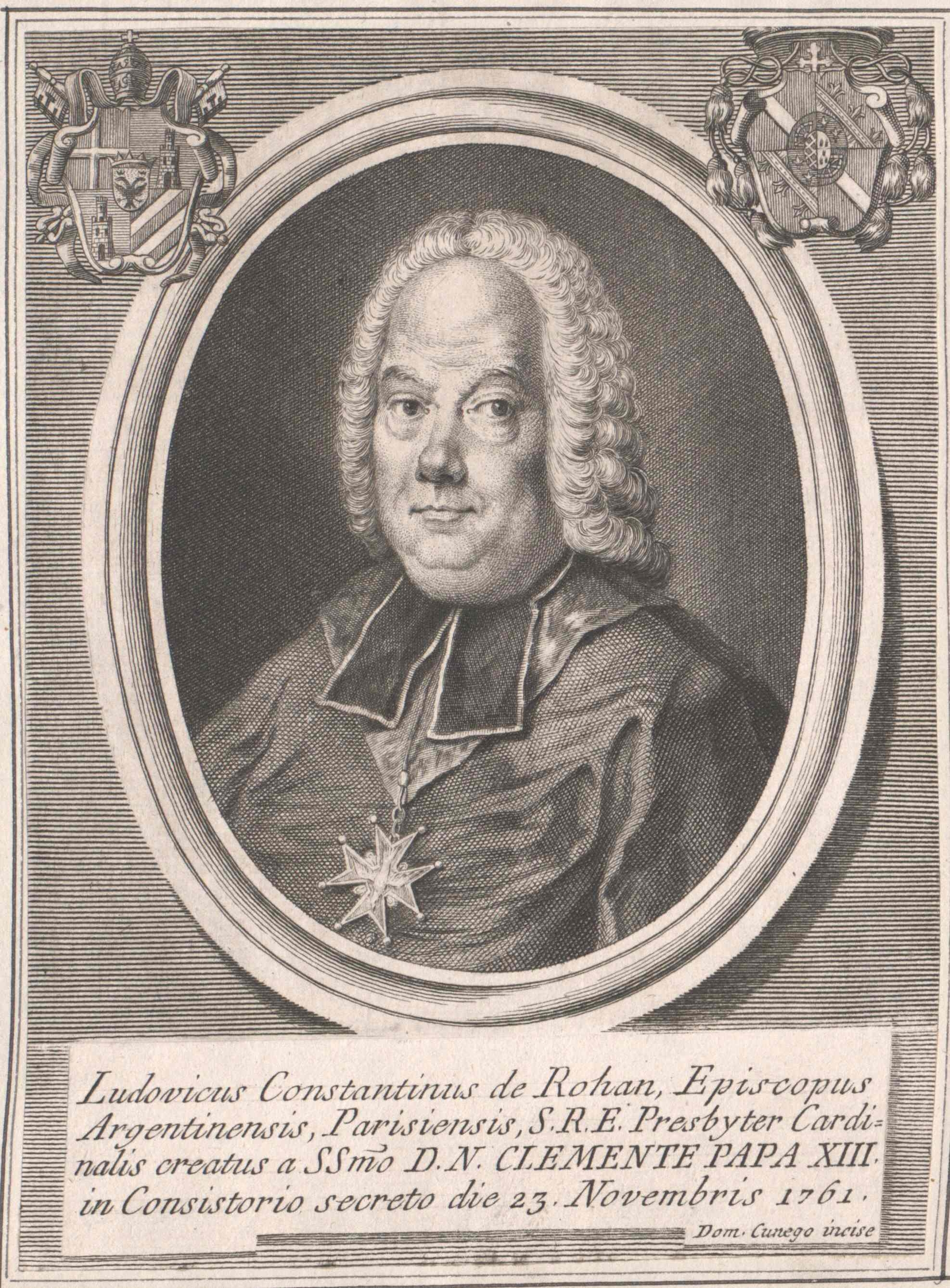
Louis-Constantin de Rohan

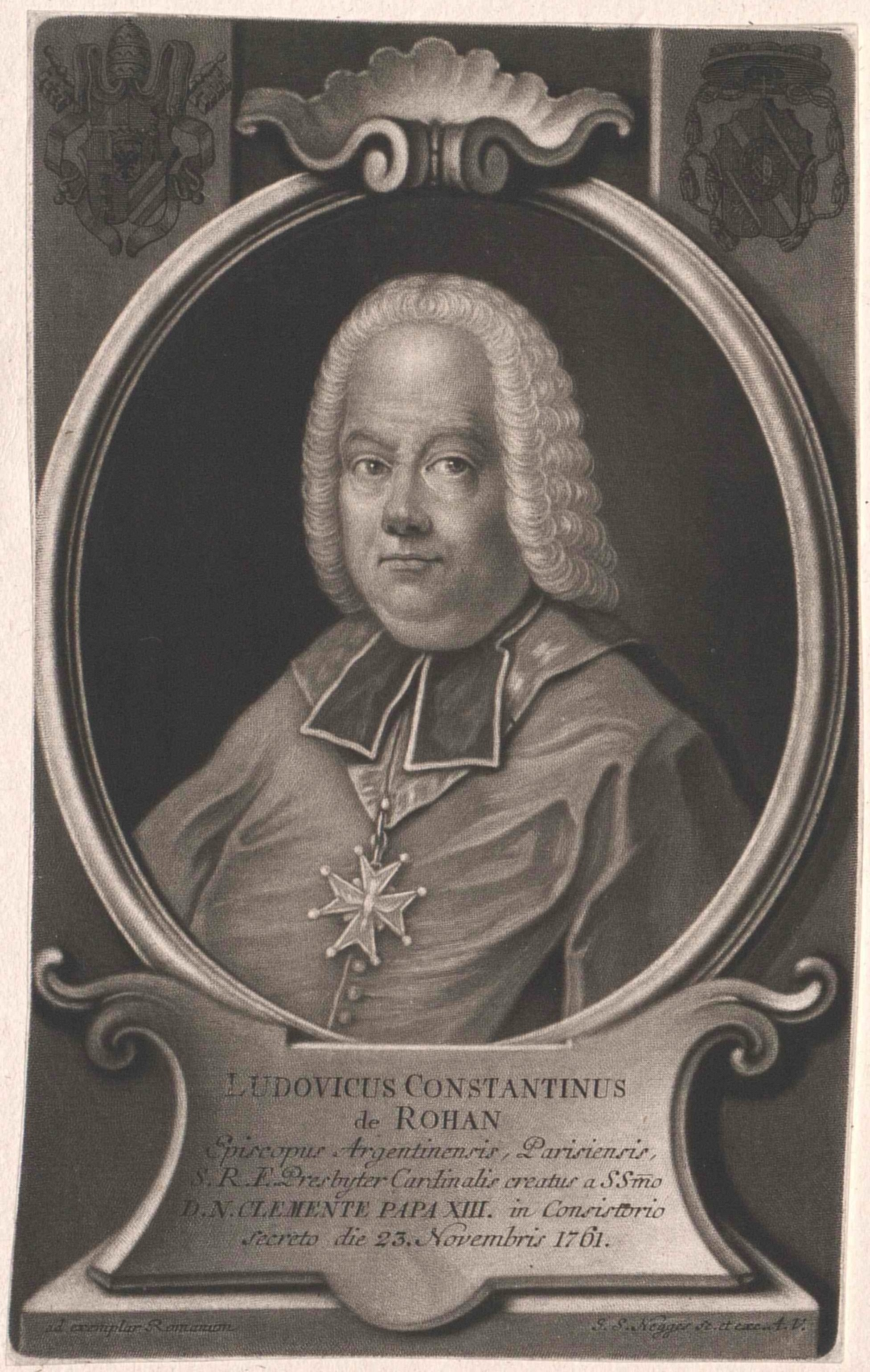
Louis-Constantin de Rohan

Louis Caesar Constantine de Rohan-Guemène belonged to the House of Rohan, an ancient and powerful family of the nobility of Brittany which dates back to the xi ^{th} century. Son of Charles III de Rohan, cousin of Armand-Gaston-Maximilien de Rohan and his second wife, Charlotte-Elisabeth de Cochefilet (1657–1719), he is the fourteenth and last child of the couple. His brother Armand-Jules de Rohan-Guémené, future archbishop of Reims, had chosen the ecclesiastical state. Louis-César-Constantin de Rohan embraced at first the career of arms. He was first a Knight of Malta before entering the navy as a naval officer. He was promoted to capitaine de vaisseau in 1720.

=== Career in the Church ===
In 1732, at the age of 35, he and entered upon an ecclesiastical career, being named canon and grand provost of Strasbourg. In 1734 he was appointed commendatory Abbot of Lyre Abbey, near Evreux, then first chaplain to the King in 1748, commendatory Abbot of Saint-Epvre the following year, and prelate-commander of the Order of the Holy Spirit in 1753. On the death in 1756 of his uncle, Armand de Rohan-Soubise, he was appointed to succeed him as Bishop of Strasbourg, a post which carried with it the title of Prince of the Holy Roman Empire (though most of the principality's territory situated on the left bank of the Rhine had been annexed by France in the late 17th century) and likewise the title of Count of Alsace. However, he was not made Grand Almoner of France, unlike other members of the Rohan family who became bishops of Strasbourg.

He was created cardinal by Pope Clement XIII at the Consistory of 23 November 1761. However, he did not take part in the conclave of 1769, summoned upon the death of Pope Clement XIII, nor in the conclave of 1774-1775, summoned upon the death of Pope Clement XIV.

His cousin and successor as Cardinal Prince-Bishop of Strasbourg, Louis-René-Édouard de Rohan-Guémené, would be compromised in the Affair of the Diamond Necklace.

== Coat of arms ==
Blazon :

Quarterly: in 1 and 4: from gules to a strip of silver loaded with a cotice of Vert; In 2 and 3: Gules to the silver band rubbed with two blossoms of the same (which is Basse-Alsace); On the whole, quartered: in 1 and 4: Gules with golden chains placed in orle, cross and saltire, loaded in the heart of an emerald in the natural (which is Navarre); In 2 and 3: Azure with fleur-de-lys of gold; On the whole: part: in 1: Gules with nine twins, laid 3, 3, 3 (which is Rohan); And in 2 of ermine (which is from Brittany).

Comments:

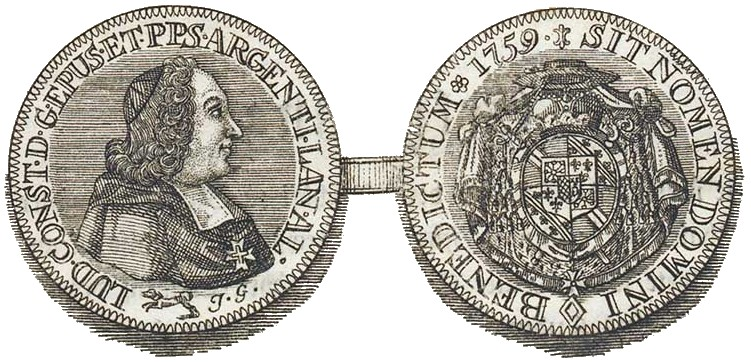

== Bibliography ==
- Louis Châtellier, "Louis-César-Constantin de Rohan", New dictionary of Alsatian biography, vol. 32, p. 3268
- Jean-Claude Fauveau, Prince Louis, Cardinal de Rohan-Guéméné, or the Diamonds of the King on Google Books, Éditions L'Harmattan, 2007, p. 31
- Michel Popoff and preface by Hervé Pinoteau, Paris, Leopard d'or,1996, 204 p. (ISBN 2-86377-140-X);

== See also ==
- House of Rohan
- Palais Rohan, Strasbourg
- Cardinals created by Clement XIII
- List of bishops, prince-bishops and archbishops of Strasbourg

Catholic Church titles
Preceded by Armand de Rohan-Soubise	Bishop of Strasbourg; 1756-1779	Succeeded by Louis René Édouard de Rohan-Guéméné
Preceded by Armand de Rohan-Soubise	Prince-Bishop of Strasbourg; 1756-1779	Succeeded by Louis René Édouard de Rohan-Guéméné
