= Carlo Rezzonico =

Carlo Rezzonico may refer to:

- Pope Clement XIII (Carlo della Torre di Rezzonico, 1693–1769)
- Carlo Rezzonico (cardinal) (1724–1799), Clement XIII's nephew and Camerlengo of the Holy Roman Church
