= Jean-François-Joseph de Rochechouart =

French Roman Catholic Cardinal

His Eminence Jean François Joseph Rochechouart
- Cardinal; Bishop of Laon; Peer of France
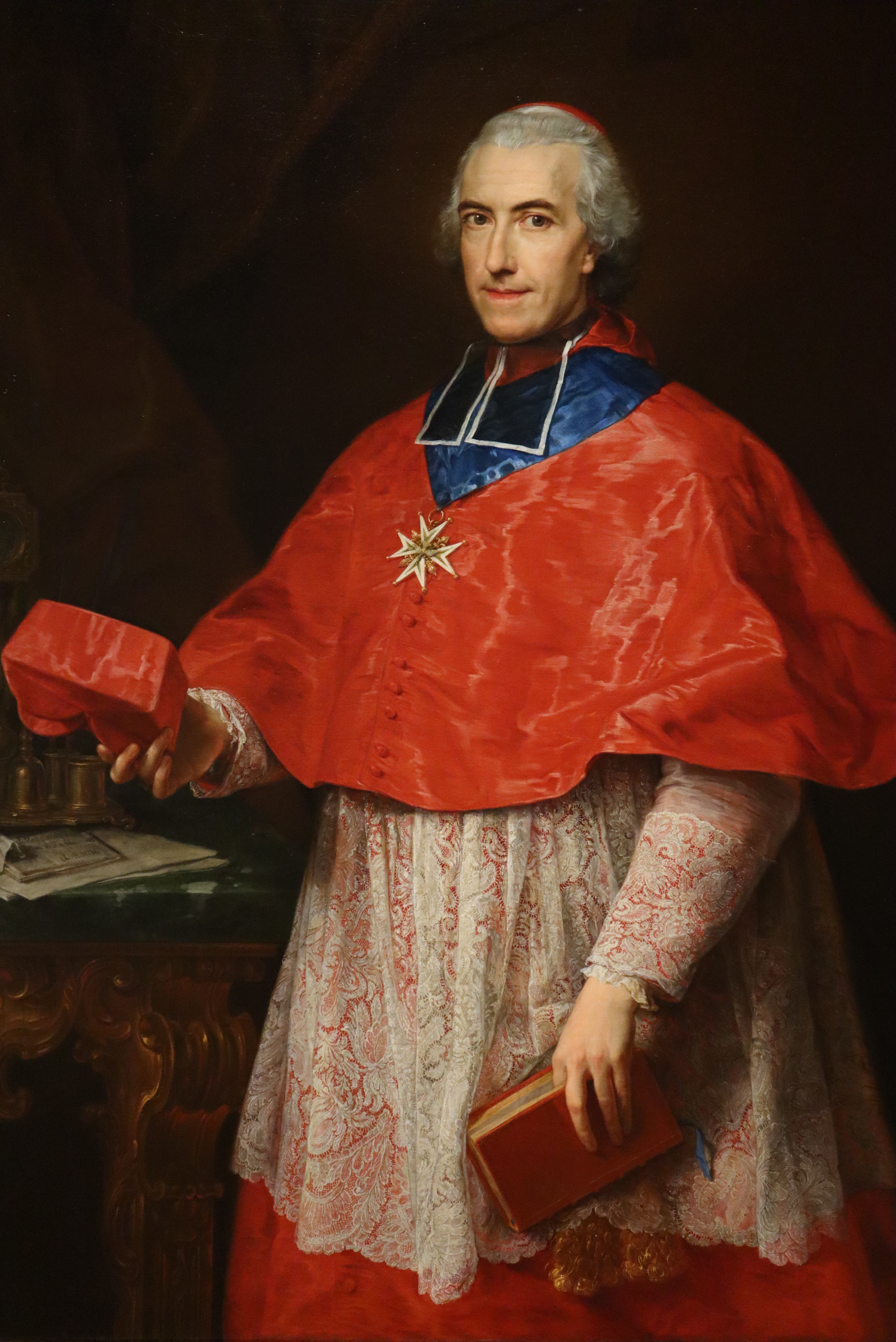
- Cardinal Rochechouart (Pompeo Batoni - 1762) in the Saint Louis Art Museum.
- Church: Roman Catholic Church
- Diocese: Laon
- See: Laon
- Appointed: 18 September 1741
- Term ended: 20 March 1777
- Predecessor: Etienne-Joseph de La Fare
- Successor: Louis-Hector-Honoré-Maxime de Sabran
- Other post: Cardinal-Priest of Sant'Eusebio (1762-77)
- Previous post: Vicar General of Rouen (1734-41)

Orders
- Consecration: 15 October 1741 by Nicolas-Charles de Saulx-Tavannes
- Created cardinal: 23 November 1761 by Pope Clement XIII
- Rank: Cardinal-Priest

Personal details
- Born: Jean François Joseph de Rochechouart; 27 January 1708 Toulouse, Kingdom of France
- Died: 20 March 1777 (aged 69) Paris, Kingdom of France
- Parents: Charles de Rochechouart; Françoise de Montesquiou
- Education: La Sorbonne

Jean François Joseph Rochechouart, Cardinal de Rochechouart (27 January 1708 – 20 March 1777) was a French Roman Catholic Cardinal.

Born in Toulouse, he was educated in the University of Paris, where he achieved licentiate in theology. After having been ordained priest he became vicar general of the archdiocese of Rouen for seven years. Elected bishop of Laon on 18 September 1741 he was also French ambassador to the Holy See from 1758 to 1762.

Pope Clement XIII created him cardinal priest in the consistory of 23 November 1761 with the title of Sant'Eusebio. He participated in the Papal conclave of 1769, but not that of 1774-1775.

Rochechouart died in 1777 in Paris.
