= Carlo Rezzonico (cardinal) =

His Eminence Carlo Rezzonico
- Cardinal-Bishop of Porto e Santa Rufina
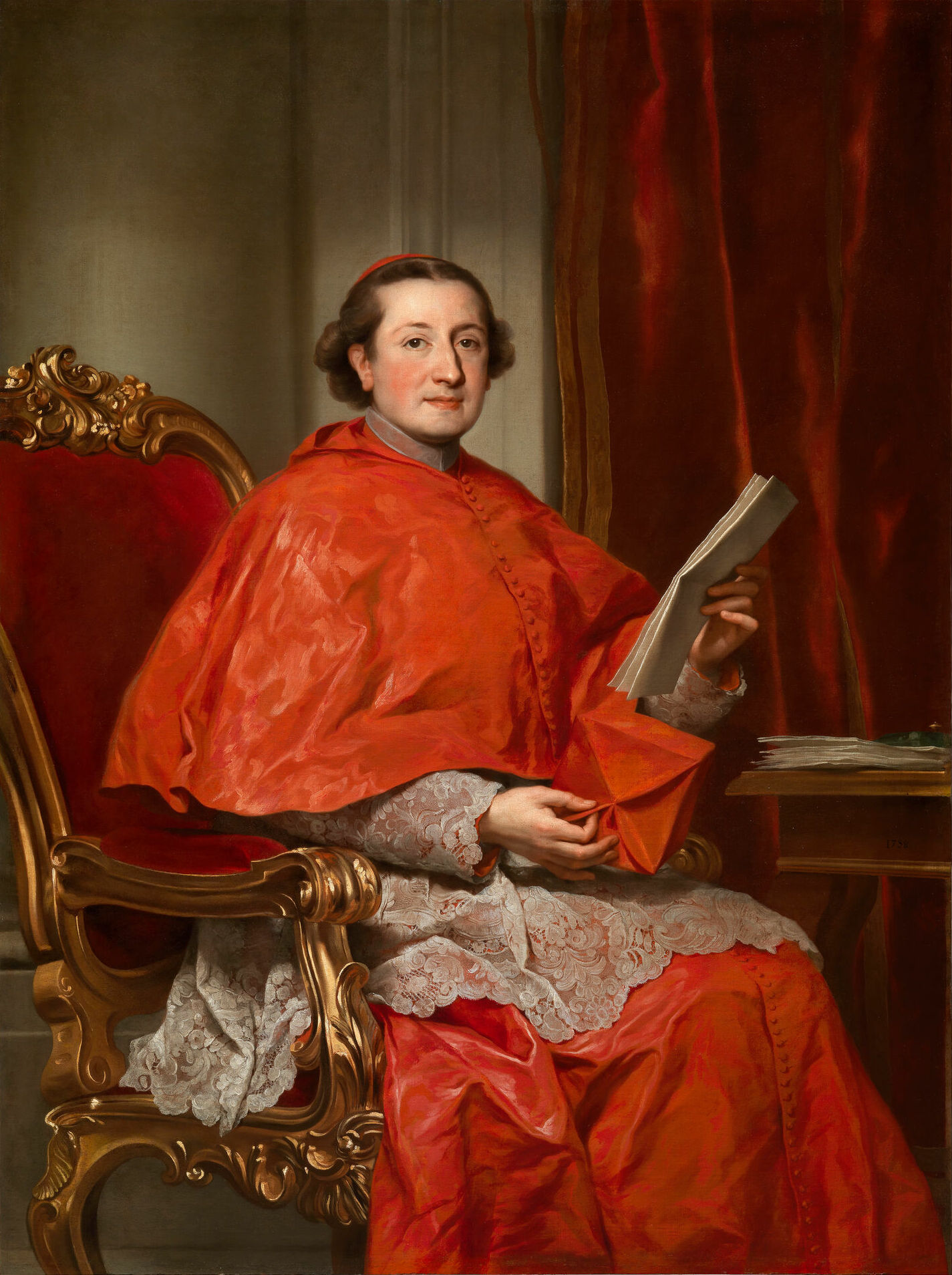
- Portrait by Anton Raphael Mengs, 1758
- Church: Catholic Church

Orders
- Consecration: 21 Mar 1773 by Gian Francesco Albani

Personal details
- Born: 25 April 1724 Venice, Republic of Venice
- Died: 26 January 1799 (aged 74) Rome, Roman Republic

Carlo Rezzonico (25 April 1724 – 26 January 1799) was a cardinal of the Roman Catholic Church. He is sometimes referred to as The Younger to distinguish him from his uncle Pope Clement XIII who also bore the name Carlo Rezzonico.

== Biography ==
Rezzonico was born on 25 April 1724 in Venice, Republic of Venice, son of Aurelio Rezzonico, 3rd Baron of the Holy Roman Empire (Venice, 12 January 1692 - 1759), and wife (1721) Anna Giustiniani (1702? - ?). His four siblings included Quintilia Rezzonico, wife in 1741 of Ludovico Widmann (1719 - 1763), with issue (including Carlo Aurelio Widmann), Cardinal Giovanni Battista Rezzonico and Abbondio Rezzonico.

On 21 March 1773, he was consecrated bishop by Gian Francesco Albani, Cardinal-Bishop of Porto e Santa Rufina, with Giuseppe Maria Contesini, Titular Archbishop of Athenae, and Orazio Mattei, Titular Archbishop of Colossae, serving as co-consecrators. He served as Vice-Chancellor of the Holy Roman Church (1758–1763), Camerlengo of the Holy Roman Church (1763–1799) and Secretary of the Roman Inquisition (1777–1799). He was also bishop of Sabina (1773–1776) and Bishop of Porto e Santa Rufina (1776–1799). As Cardinal Camerlengo, he participated in the papal conclave, 1769 and papal conclave, 1774-1775.

He belonged to the Zelanti faction and defended the Society of Jesus against the accusations that finally led to the suppression of this order.

He died on January 26, 1799, at the age of 74.

Catholic Church titles
Preceded by Alberico Archinto	Cardinal-Priest of San Lorenzo in Damaso; 1758–1763	Succeeded by Henry Benedict Mary Clement Stuart of York
Preceded by Giovanni Francesco Albani	Cardinal-Priest of San Clemente; 1763–1772	Succeeded by Francesco Carafa della Spina di Traetto
Preceded by Girolamo Colonna di Sciarra	Camerlengo of the Holy Roman Church; 1763–1799	Succeeded by Romoaldo Braschi-Onesti
Preceded by Antonio Maria Priuli	Cardinal-Priest of San Marco; 1772–1799	Succeeded by Ludovico Flangini Giovanelli
Preceded by Giovanni Francesco Albani	Cardinal-Bishop of Sabina; 1773–1776	Succeeded by Andrea Corsini
Preceded by Giovanni Francesco Albani	Cardinal-Bishop of Porto e Santa Rufina; 1776–1799	Succeeded by Leonardo Antonelli
