= Apostolicum pascendi =

18th-century papal bull

Apostolicum pascendi was a papal bull issued by Pope Clement XIII on 12 January 1765 in defense of the Society of Jesus.

It relates that both privately and publicly the Society was the object of much calumny. On the other hand, the Society was the subject of praise on the part of bishops for the useful work its members were doing in their dioceses.

To confirm this approval and to counteract the calumnies which had been spreading throughout different countries, the Pope confirmed the Society as it was originally constituted, approved its end and its method of work, and whatever sodalities its members have under their charge.

In 1764 the Jesuits had been expelled from France by Louis XV. Internally in the Catholic Church, also, they were under pressure. The temporary suppression of the Jesuits would take place in 1773, after partial suppression in significant countries in 1767.

== See also ==
- Dominus ac Redemptor (1773), suppression of the Jesuits
- Sollicitudo omnium ecclesiarum (1814), restoration of the Jesuits
