= Sollicitudo omnium ecclesiarum =

1814 papal bull reestablishing the Society of Jesus

Sollicitudo omnium ecclesiarum (The care of all Churches) was a papal bull issued in 1814 by Pope Pius VII, reestablishing the Society of Jesus (Jesuits) after its suppression by the 1773 breve issued by Clement XIV, Dominus ac Redemptor. Nevertheless, the order continued to exist in some places. Pius VII had earlier, with the brief Catholicae Fidei (March 7, 1801), approved the existence of the Society of Jesus in Russia. The Vicar General, Franciszek Kareu, was declared "Superior General of the Jesuits in Russia".

Pope Paul VI issued an encyclical letter, also named Sollicitudo omnium ecclesiarum, on June 24, 1969.
