= Antonio Eugenio Visconti =

Italian cardinal (1713–1788)

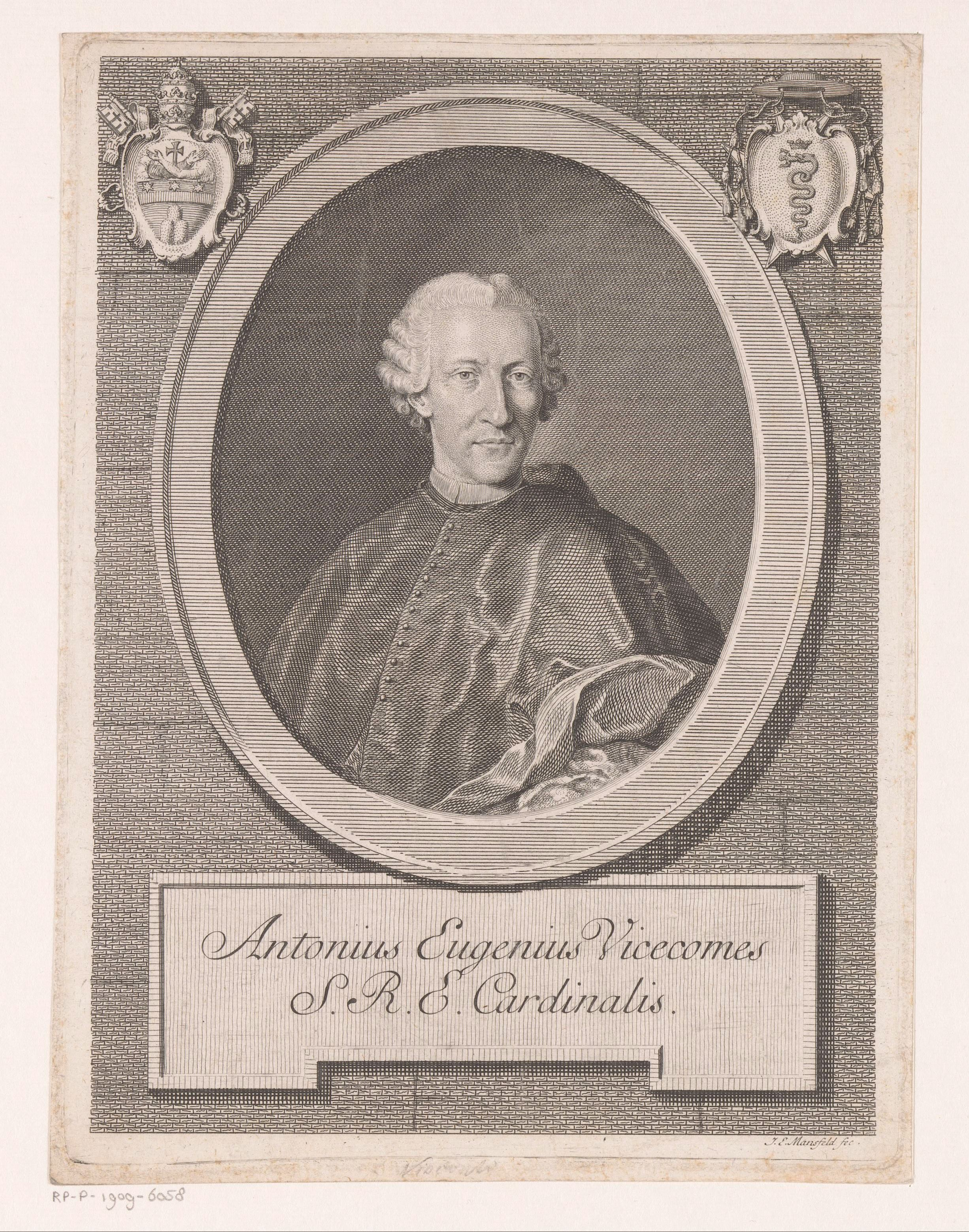
Portret van Antonio Eugenio Visconti, RP-P-1909-6058.jpg

Antonio Eugenio Visconti (17 June 1713 – 4 March 1788) was an Italian cardinal and archbishop of the Catholic Church.

== Biography ==
Antonio Eugenio Visconti was born in Milan on 17 June 1713, the son of Annibale Visconti, a fieldmarshall of the Holy Roman Empire, and the noblewoman Claudia Erba-Odescalchi, a relative of Pope Innocent XI. His godfather was the famous leader Eugenio di Savoia.

He completed his studies at the University of Pavia, where he obtained his doctorate in utroque iure on 19 December 1737. After graduating, he practiced law at the Milan forum and was rapporteur of the Sacred Council of the Sacred Consulta from 1748, becoming secretary of the Sacred Congregation for Indulgences and Relics. Administrator of the Hospital of San Gallo in Rome, he became a priest of the Archconfraternity of the Pilgrims and of the Carmine, and held a position as well with the Supreme Tribunal of the Apostolic Signatura.

He took the sacred orders on 22 December 1759 and on 28 January 1760, he was chosen titular archbishop of Ephesus, being consecrated a bishop on 28 June by Pope Clement XIII. Appointed assistant to the papal throne on 20 February 1760, he became Apostolic Nuncio to Poland on 22 February of that year. He was transferred to the nunciature in Austria as of 22 November 1766.

He was made a cardinal in pectore in the papal consistory of 17 June 1771, and it was made public on 19 April 1773. He participated in the conclave of 1774–1775 that elected Pope Pius VI. As cardinal, his titular church was Santa Croce in Gerusalemme. He became Prefect of the Congregation for Indulgences and Holy Relics in 1782.

He died in Rome on 4 March 1788 and he was entombed in his titular church.
