= Vincenzo Milione =

Italian painter (1735–1805)

Vincenzo Milione (1735–1805) was an Italian painter.

Milione was born in Calabria. He moved to Rome where he worked. He primarily painted portraits. One of his works is located at the Pinacoteca Nazionale di Bologna. Another one, signed, is kept at the Diocesan Museum of Jesi. He died in Rome in 1805.
