= Lorenzo Ricci =

Superior General of the Society of Jesus

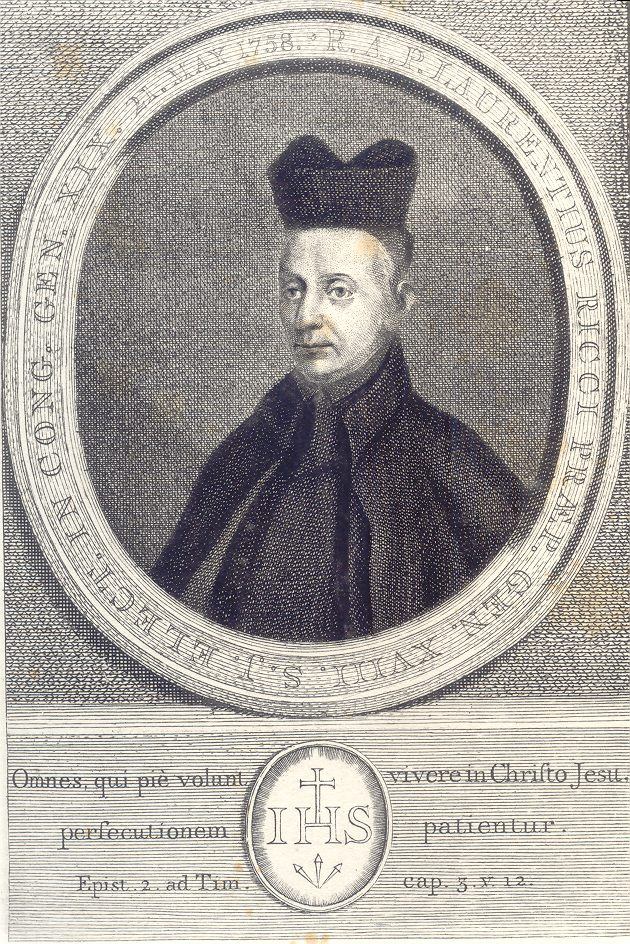
Lorenzo Ricci

Lorenzo Ricci (2 August 1703 – 24 November 1775) was an Italian Jesuit, elected the eighteenth Superior General of the Society of Jesus. He was also the last before the suppression of the Jesuits in 1773.

== Early life and career ==
Ricci was born in Florence, Italy, into one of the most ancient and illustrious families of Tuscany. When very young, he was sent to Prato to the Jesuits Cicognini College. He entered the Society when he was scarcely fifteen, on 16 December 1718, at the novitiate of S. Andrea at Rome.

Having completed his studies in philosophy (1722–25) and theology (1729–34) at the Roman College of Rome, he taught at Siena and Rome. He was formally professed in August 1736. From 1751 to 1755 he was spiritual director at the Roman College. In fact this quiet and unassuming spiritual work – in particular giving the Spiritual Exercises of Ignatius of Loyola (a form of guided retreat) – seemed to have had his preference. In 1755, he was chosen secretary of the society.

== Superior General ==
At the 19th General Congregation, in May 1758, Ricci was elected Superior General of the Society of Jesus at the second ballot. Guilio Cordara, who lived near Ricci and seems to have known him intimately, deplored this choice: "On account of his placid nature and too even temper, I regarded him as little suited for a time when disturbance and storm seem to require extraordinary application of unusual remedies to unusual evils". Ricci himself asked to be relieved of the responsibility.

=== Jesuits in Portugal ===
The crisis with the Catholic Bourbon royal courts was coming to a head. Four months after Ricci's election, an attempt was made on the life of King Joseph I of Portugal. Prime Minister Carvalho, jealous of Gabriel Malagrida's influence at court, charged the Jesuit with involvement in the plot. Malagrida was declared guilty of high treason, but, as a priest, could not be executed without the consent of the Inquisition, so he was executed for heresy instead. The Jesuits were expelled from Portugal in September 1759. The decree also included the Portuguese possessions of Brazil, Goa, and Macao.

=== Jesuits in France ===
The Jesuits in France had earned the enmity of the influential Madame de Pompadour. According to the Comtesse de Courson, in 1752, Pompadour had approached the Jesuits requesting to be openly admitted the sacraments, in hopes of strengthening her position and influence to the detriment of the Queen and the Dauphin. Suspecting her motives were less than spiritual, the priests demurred until such time as she should cease to be the King's mistress. Within a few years, she became one of the most ardent promoters of the destruction of the Society; the reason for her hostility suspected by many.

Antoine de La Valette was the thirty-four-year-old superior of the missions in Martinique, which were heavily in debt. Lavallette borrowed heavily, became over-extended, and went bankrupt when the British seized twelve of thirteen ships carrying produce from the plantations for sale in France. The Society's efforts to intervene with LaValette in Martinique were hampered by the Seven Years' War. The war had left France almost bankrupt, and the Duke de Choiseul, minister for foreign affairs and secretary of war, saw in the Jesuit assets an opportunity to rebuild crown revenue. The French Jesuits were making an effort to settle with the creditors, but when the case was brought before the courts, the whole Society was held responsible for the debt, and a decree was issued for the seizure of all their property. This rendered the Society in France bankrupt. An anonymous French author published a pamphlet supposedly of letters between Ricci and Corsican insurgents. The Society was expelled from France in 1764, from Spain and Naples in 1767, and from the Duchy of Parma in 1768. The helpless Ricci saw it all.

As long as Clement XIII was pope, the Society was somehow protected in Rome. The Pope gave a new public approval of the Society (the bull Apostolicum pascendi, of 1769). The Pope advised courage, prayer and patience to Ricci, who was inexperienced in the art of governing and who had always lived apart from the world and diplomatic intrigues.

Ricci sent circular letters to the Jesuits on Fervent perseverance in Prayer (1763), On greater fervour in prayer in 1769, and just a few months before the suppression of the Society another one on a New Incentive to Prayer (February 1773). Clearly, he was not in touch with what was going on. But pressure on the Holy See was increasing and at the conclave called (in 1769) to elect a successor to Clement XIII the suppression of the Jesuits was the main issue. Clement XIV was elected; it is not clear whether he made a promise to have the Society suppressed. After his election, Clement XIV took harsh and humiliating decisions against the Society in order to placate its enemies, but political pressure went on unrelentingly and the Pope finally suppressed the order (Dominus ac Redemptor of 21 July 1773), the main reason being that he wanted to "restore peace in the Church".

== Death ==
Jesuit communities were disbanded, libraries confiscated, and properties looted. Under pressure from Spanish ambassador José Moñino, 1st Count of Floridablanca, Ricci was put behind bars at the Castel Sant'Angelo, Rome, where he suffered further humiliation and ill treatment (for example, he was not allowed to celebrate the Mass). The charges leveled publicly against the Jesuits were never brought in a court of law: no process of justice was gone through. Before he died Ricci solemnly declared before witnesses: "I say and protest that the Society of Jesus did not give any ground warranting its suppression; nor is there any right reason why I should have been put in jail." He is buried in the crypt of the Gesù Church in Rome.

About six weeks after Ricci's death, Pope Pius VI ordered the release of Ricci's five assistants.

Catholic Church titles
Preceded by Aloysius Centurione	Superior General of the Society of Jesus; 1758–1773	Succeeded by suppression Stanislaus Czerniewicz as Temporary Vicar General of the Society of Jesus
