= Francesco Saverio de Zelada =

His Eminence Francesco Saverio de Zelada
- Archivist of the Vatican Secret Archives; Librarian of the Vatican Apostolic Library
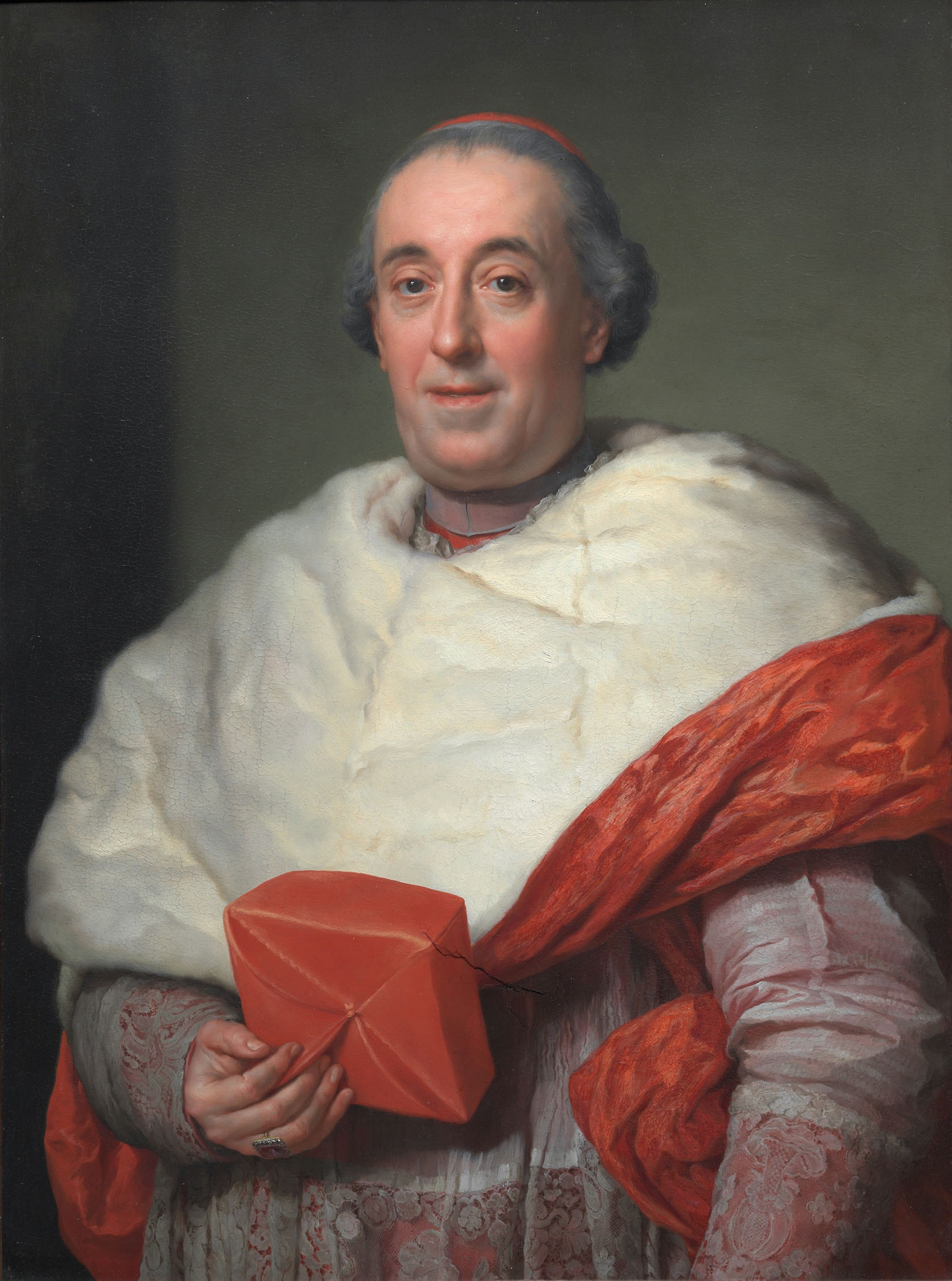
- Portrait - Anton Raphael Mengs (1773-74).
- Church: Roman Catholic Church
- Appointed: 15 December 1779
- Term ended: 19 December 1801
- Predecessor: Alessandro Albani
- Successor: Luigi Valenti Gonzaga
- Other posts: Cardinal-Priest of Santi Silvestro e Martino ai Monti in commendum (1773-1801); Archpriest of the Basilica of Saint John Lateran (1781-1801); Major Penitentiary of the Apostolic Penitentiary (1788-1801); Cardinal-Priest of Santa Prassede (1793-1801); Prefect of the Consistorial Congregation (1800-01)
- Previous posts: Titular Archbishop of Petra (1766-73); Camerlengo of the College of Cardinals (1783-84); Secretary of State (1789-96)

Orders
- Ordination: 23 October 1740
- Consecration: 28 December 1766 by Pope Clement XIII
- Created cardinal: 19 April 1773 by Pope Clement XIV
- Rank: Cardinal-Priest

Personal details
- Born: Francesco Saverio de Zelada; 27 August 1717 Rome, Papal States
- Died: 19 December 1801 (aged 84) Rome, Papal States
- Buried: Santi Silvestro e Martino ai Monti
- Parents: Juan de Zelada; Manuela Rodríguez
- Education: La Sapienza

Francesco Saverio de Zelada (Note: In Spanish, Francisco Javier (or Xavier) Zelada y Rodríguez.) (27 August 1717, in Rome – 19 December 1801, in Rome) was a cardinal of the Roman Catholic Church, born of a Spanish family, who served in the Papal Curia and in the diplomatic service of the Holy See.

He was educated at the University of La Sapienza, gaining degrees in both canon and civil law. He was ordained on 23 October 1740. Zelada was appointed titular Archbishop of Petra on 23 December 1766, and cardinal priest in the consistory of 19 April 1773. Appointed by means of a papal brief of Pope Clement XIV, he was the principal negotiator for the Holy See and composer of the brief Dominus ac Redemptor of 8 June 1773, that suppressed the Society of Jesus. On 2 October, the Diario di Roma reported he had been given a Meissen group representing the death of St. Francis Xavier, confiscated from the Jesuits.

Already Camerlengo of the Sacred College of Cardinals (1783–84), his career culminated in his appointment by Pope Pius VI as Cardinal Secretary of State, 1789–1796, in which post he was entrusted with difficult negotiations with the French Revolutionary state, which included his conclusion of peace in 1793. With the French occupation of Rome, Cardinal Zelada retired to Tuscany. Following Pius' death, Zelada participated in the Papal conclave of 1800 that elected Pope Pius VII.

Librarian of the Holy Roman Church from 15 December 1779 until his death, Cardinal Zelada was not known for his religious fervor. Rather he was a great collector of books, of coins and medals and other works of art, and of scientific machines. He had a telescope installed in his house near Il Gesù, and transferred it to his residence as Cardinal-Librarian. He installed an observatory at the Collegio Romano. After his death, his printed books went to the Vatican Library, while his manuscripts - already sent to Spain for safe keeping, went to the capitular library of Toledo. His collection of anatomical models he bequeathed to the Ospedale di Santo Spirito.

He is buried in the church of San Martino ai Monti, Rome.
