= Ludovico Calini =

His Eminence Ludovico Calini
- Prefect of the Congregation of Indulgences and Relics
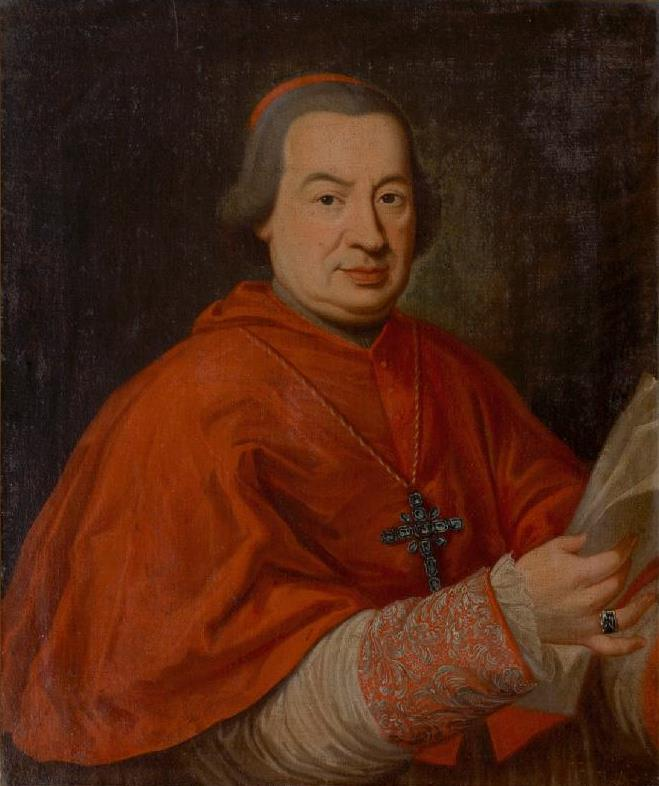
- Church: Roman Catholic
- Archdiocese: Milan
- Province: Milan
- Metropolis: Milan
- Diocese: Crema
- See: Crema
- Installed: 25 September 1730
- Term ended: 0 December 1782
- Predecessor: Saverio Giustiniani
- Successor: Cardinal Giuseppe Garampi
- Other post: Cardinal-Priest of Sant'Anastasia

Orders
- Ordination: 17 December 1718
- Consecration: 25 September 1730 by Cardinal Angelo Maria Quirini
- Created cardinal: 26 September 1766 by Pope Clement XIII
- Rank: Cardinal-Priest

Personal details
- Born: 9 January 1696 Calino
- Died: 9 December 1782 (aged 86) Brescia
- Buried: Church of Ss.Faustino e Giovita
- Denomination: Roman Catholic
- Parents: Count Vincenzo Calini and Teodora Gonzaga Martinengoi

Ludovico Calini (9 January 1696 Calino – 9 December 1782, Brescia) was an Italian cardinal.

== Biography ==
Cardinal Calini was born in Calino on 9 January 1696.

He was ordained priest on 17 December 1718 and elected bishop of the diocese of Crema on 11 September 1730. Ten days later, on the 21st, he was consecrated by Cardinal Angelo Maria Quirini at the Church of San Marco, Pope Clement XIII created him a cardinal on 27 September 1766 and received the red hat and the title of Sant'Anastasia on the 30th of September of the same year.

He died on 9 December 1782 at the age of 86. At his death, he was the oldest member of the College of Cardinals.

== See also ==
- Roman Catholic Archdiocese of Benevento

== Notes ==
Catholic Church titles
Preceded by Faustino Giuseppe Griffoni Sant'Angelo	Bishop of Crema; 21 September 1730 – 17 January 1751	Succeeded by Marco Antonio Lombardi
Preceded by Archbishop Antonio Maria Pallavicini	Patriach of Antioch; 01 February 1751 – 26 September 1766	Succeeded by Archbishop Domenico Giordani
Preceded by vacant Carlo Vittorio Amedeo Delle Lanze	Cardinal-Priest of Sant'Anastasia; 26 September 1766 – 04 March 1771	Succeeded by Muzio Gallo
Preceded by Pietro Paolo Conti	Cardinal-Priest of Santo Stefano al Monte Celio; 14 March 1771–9 December 1782	Succeeded by Nicola Colonna di Stigliano
Records
Preceded by Alessandro Albani	Oldest living Member of the Sacred College; 11 December 1779 – 9 December 1782	Succeeded by Paul d'Albert de Luynes
