= Marcantonio Colonna (cardinal) =

Italian Catholic cardinal

His Eminence Marcantonio Colonna
- Vicar General of Rome
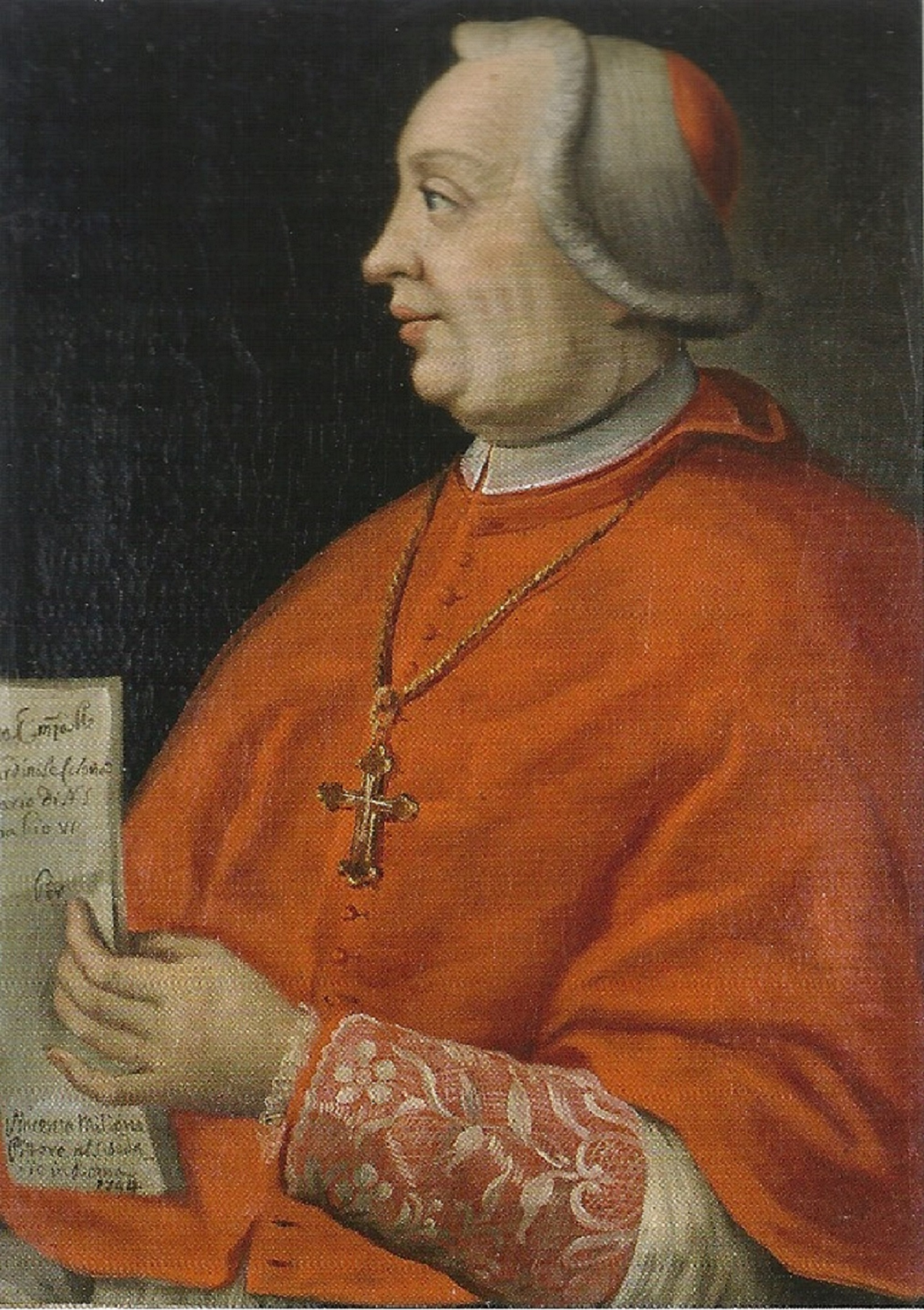
- Church: Roman Catholic Church
- Diocese: Rome
- See: Rome
- Appointed: 19 April 1762
- Term ended: 4 December 1793
- Predecessor: Antonio Maria Erba-Odescalchi
- Successor: Andrea Corsini
- Other posts: Congregation for the Residence of Bishops (1762-93); Archpriest of Santa Maria Maggiore (1763-93); Cardinal-Bishop of Palestrina (1784-93)
- Previous posts: Prefect of the Apostolic Palace (1743-59); Cardinal-Deacon of Santa Maria in Aquiro (1759-62); Titular Archbishop of Corinthus (1762); Cardinal-Priest of Santa Maria della Pace (1762-84); Camerlengo of the College of Cardinals (1770-71); Cardinal-Priest of San Lorenzo in Lucina (1784); Cardinal Protopriest (1784)

Orders
- Ordination: 1 February 1761
- Consecration: 25 April 1762 by Pope Clement XIII
- Created cardinal: 19 November 1759 by Pope Clement XIII
- Rank: Cardinal-Deacon (1759-62); Cardinal-Priest (1762-84); Cardinal-Bishop (1784-93)

Personal details
- Born: Marcantonio Colonna; 16 August 1724 Rome, Papal States
- Died: 4 December 1793 (aged 69) Rome, Papal States
- Buried: Santi Apostoli
- Parents: Fabrizio Colonna; Caterina Zefirina Salviati
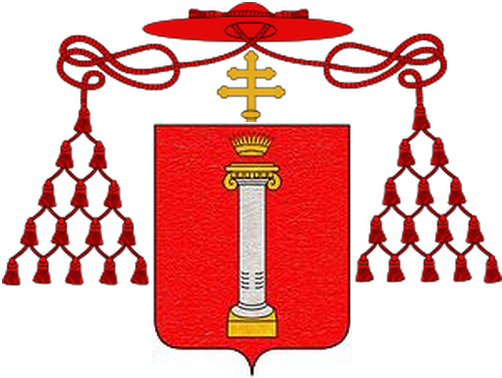
- Coat of arms

Marcantonio Colonna (16 August 1724 – 4 December 1793) was an Italian Catholic cardinal. Born in Rome on 16 August 1724, Colonna was made Cardinal-Deacon of Santa Maria in Aquiro by Pope Clement XIII on 19 November 1759. He was then ordained a deacon on 9 March 1760 and a priest on 1 February 1761. He was appointed Titular Archbishop of Corinthus and Cardinal-Priest of Santa Maria della Pace by Pope Clement XIII on 19 April 1762. Soon thereafter, on 25 April, Colonna was ordained a bishop. Pope Clement XIII acted as his consecrator while Cardinal Gian Francesco Albani (grand-nephew of Pope Clement XI) and Cardinal Henry Benedict Stuart acted as co-consecrators.

In 1763, he was appointed Prefect of the Congregation for Residence of Bishops and in January of that year, he was appointed Archpriest of the Basilica di Santa Maria Maggiore. On 25 June 1784, Colonna was made Cardinal-Priest of San Lorenzo in Lucina by Pope Clement XIV and on 20 September 1784, he was appointed Cardinal-Bishop of Palestrina. Colonna died on 4 December 1793.
