= Vitaliano Borromeo (cardinal) =

Italian cardinal (1720–1793)

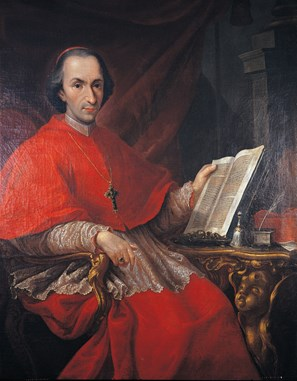
Cardinal Vitaliano Borromeo

Vitaliano Borromeo (3 March 1720 – 7 June 1793) was a Roman Catholic archbishop and cardinal.

== Biography ==
Vitaliano was born in Milan, the third son of Giovanni Benedetto Borromeo and Clelia Grillo. He was the uncle of the Cardinal Giovanni Archinto on his maternal side. On his paternal side, he was related to six other cardinals: St Charles Borromeo (1560), Federico Borromeo the elder (1587), Federico Borromeo the younger (1670), Giberto Borromeo (1652), Giberto Bartolomeo Borromeo(1717), and subsequent to his death, Edoardo Borromeo (1868).

In 1733, he enrolled in the Collegio dei Nobili of Milan, but transferred in 1735 to Rome, and subsequently graduated with a doctorate from the University of Pavia in 1745. He entered an ecclesiastical career in Rome.

He was named referendary to the Apostolic Signatura; then vice-legate of Bologna from 1747 to 1754. He was ordained in 1747.

He served as nuncio to Tuscany in 1756, and to Vienna in 1759. He was created a cardinal in 1766 by pope Clement XIII. He participated in two conclaves: 1769 and 1774–1775. He died in Rome.
