= Andrea Negroni =

Italian Cardinal

His Eminence Andrea Negroni
- Cardinal-Deacon of Santi Vito, Modesto e Crescenzio

Orders
- Ordination: March 20, 1760 (subdeacon)
- Created cardinal: July 18, 1763

Personal details
- Born: November 2, 1710 Rome
- Died: January 17, 1789 (aged 78) Rome
- Buried: Church of Sts. Bartholomew and Alexander, Rome
- Denomination: Roman Catholic
- Residence: Rome
- Parents: Count Giovanni Battista Negroni & Ludovisi di San Casiano

Andrea Negroni (November 2, 1710 – January 17, 1789) was an Italian Cardinal who was Cardinal-Deacon of the titular Church of Santi Vito, Modesto e Crescenzio from 1765 to 1779.

== Life ==
=== Ancestry ===
Negroni was born in Rome, the eldest of the two sons of Count Giovanni Battista Negroni, whose family had originated from Bergamo, and his wife, Ludovisi di San Casiano. Their other child was Stanislaus. Through him, the Negroni family was added to the Roman nobility in 1746. His grandfather, Count Giovanni Francesco Negroni, had been appointed as Governor of the territory of Orvieto, part of the Papal States, in 1673 by the Holy See. The family name is also listed as Nigronus.

In 1725, their father, Count Giovanni Battista Negroni was introduced to the Stuart Pretender, James Stuart, the would-be James III of England. He acted as his host that year and came to be a friend of the Stuart family.

The Count was deeply involved in astrology and came to be suspected of necromancy, which was considered to be heresy by the Church. It was a crime under which several people from his own estates were condemned as sorcerers and witches and were sentenced to be burned to death. Due to his family connections with the Church, the Count was spared any investigation. After his death in 1730, however, all his notes and writings were burned.

=== Church career ===
Starting in 1735, Andrea Negroni occupied several posts of increasing responsibility in the Roman Curia, notably at the Apostolic Signatura, and was appointed a secular canon of St Peter's Basilica in 1759. The following year, he was ordained a subdeacon; that same year he was named commendatory abbot of the Abbey of SS. Severo e Martirio nell'Orvietano, a post he held until 1789.

Negroni was made a Cardinal-Deacon by Pope Clement XIII in the consistory of 18 July 1763, receiving his red hat three days later, and given the titular Church of S. Maria in Aquiro. He went on to be given additional posts appropriate to his new station, such as Auditor of His Holiness (1765) and Secretary of the Chancery of Apostolic Briefs (1767-1775). He also served as the Cardinal Protector of the Cistercian Order, as well as of the Bernardine nuns and the Basilian monks, as well as of Bergamo and numerous towns and groups. In 1765, he was granted the transfer of his title to the Church of Sts. Vitus, Modest and Crescentius.

In 1763, the Cardinal took responsibility for raising the young Marquess Ercole Consalvi, whose father had just died. Consalvi went on to become an official of the Papal Court, and himself a Cardinal, rising to the office of Cardinal Secretary of State under Pope Pius VII, whose chief advisor he was through the turbulent years of the French occupation of Italy (1797-1814).

Negroni took part in the 1769 conclave which elected Pope Clement XIV and that of 1774-75 which elected Pope Pius VI.

=== Death ===
He died in Rome where his funeral was held at the Basilica of St. Augustine there, with burial taking place there in the family sepulcher in the Bergamese-connected Church of Sts. Bartholomew and Alexander.
