= Domenico Orsini d'Aragona =

Italian cardinal (1719–1789)

- Cardinal-Deacon of Santa Maria in Via Lata
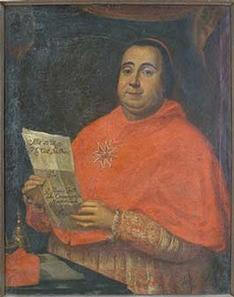
- Church: Catholic Church
- See: Santa Maria in Via Lata
- In office: 13 December 1779 – 10 January 1789
- Predecessor: Alessandro Albani
- Successor: Ignazio Boncompagni-Ludovisi
- Previous posts: Cardinal-Deacon of Sant'Agata de' Goti (1777-1779); Cardinal-Deacon of Santa Maria ad Martyres (1763-1777); Cardinal-Deacon of San Nicola in Carcere (1753-1763); Cardinal-Deacon of Santi Vito, Modesto e Crescenzia (1743-1753)

Orders
- Ordination: 6 November 1768
- Created cardinal: 9 September 1743 by Pope Benedict XIV

Personal details
- Born: 5 June 1719 Naples, Kingdom of Naples
- Died: 10 January 1789 (aged 69) Rome, Papal States

Domenico Orsini d'Aragona (Naples, 5 June 1719 – Rome, 10 January 1789) was an Italian, Roman Catholic Cardinal.

== Biography ==
He was born to Ferdinando Bernualdo Filippo Orsini, the 14th Duke of Gravina, and his second wife, Giacinta Marescotti-Ruspoli. Domenico was the grand-nephew of Pierfrancesco Orsini, who in 1724 became Pope Benedict XIII. In 1734, Domenico succeeded his father as the 15th Duke of Gravina. Also that year, he was named by King Charles VII of Naples to be ambassador to the Vatican. In 1738, he wed the princess Anna Paola Flaminia of the Ducal family of Odescalchi-Erba di Bracciano, and with her had four children: Maria Maddalena, Giacinta, Filippo e Amedeo (Filippo Bernualdo). In 1739 he was named a knight of the Order of San Gennaro.

Widowed in 1742, Pope Benedict XIV nominated him a cardinal deacon, since he had never taken priestly orders. He was ordained a priest finally on 6 November 1768. He was made the titular head of a number of churches including Ss. Vito, Modesto e Cresceglia, S. Nicola in Carcere, Santa Maria ad Martyres, Santa Agata de’ Goti, and Santa Maria in Via Lata. He was a patron of the painter Domenico Corvi.

He remained in close contact with the Neapolitan kingdom, and in 1748, he was named Cardinal protector of the Kingdom of Two Sicilies by Charles VII of Naples. He worked with the Neapolitan minister Bernardo Tanucci in the suppression of the Jesuit order; although Tanucci accused him of allowing the former French Jesuits to enter Naples under Roman passports. Domenico was entailed with forwarding the suppression of Jesuits, and tried to advance the beatification of the former antagonist of the order, Juan de Palafox y Mendoza. The relationships of Naples and Rome during the late 1760s were fraught with disagreements.

He participated in three conclaves, 1758, 1769, and 1774–75.
