= Dominus ac Redemptor =

1773 papal brief that suppressed the Society of Jesus

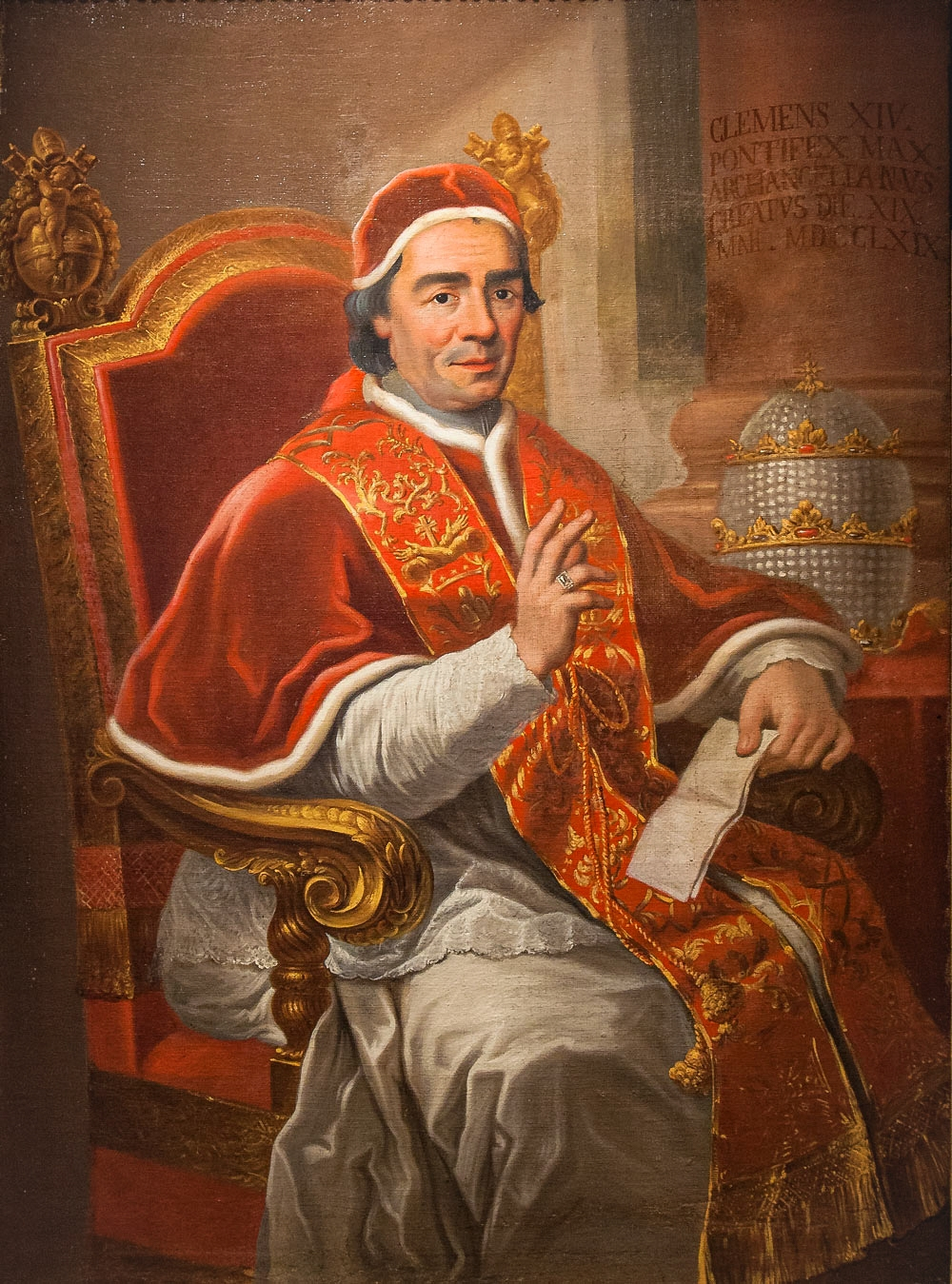
Pope Clement XIV

Dominus ac Redemptor (Lord and Redeemer) is the papal brief promulgated on 21 July 1773 by which Pope Clement XIV suppressed the Society of Jesus. The Society was restored in 1814 by Pius VII.

== Background ==
The Jesuits had been expelled from Brazil (1754), Portugal (1759), France (1764), Spain and its colonies (1767) and Parma (1768). Though he had to face strong pressure on the part of the ambassadors of the Bourbon courts, Pope Clement XIII always refused to yield to their demands to have the Society of Jesus suppressed.

The issue had reached such a crisis point, however, that the question seems to have been the main issue determining the outcome of the conclave of 1769 that was called to elect a successor to Clement XIII. While in France, Spain, and Portugal the suppression had taken place de facto; the accession of a new pope was made the occasion for insisting on the abolition of the order root and branch, de facto and de jure, in Europe and all over the world. Giovanni Cardinal Ganganelli, a Conventual Franciscan friar, was one of five papabili. His position on the "Jesuit question" was somewhat ambiguous. When asked, he told the anti-Jesuit court cardinals that "he recognized in the sovereign pontiff the right to extinguish, with good conscience, the Society of Jesus, provided he observed the canon law; and that it was desirable that the pope should do everything in his power to satisfy the wishes of the Crowns". At the same time, the pro-Jesuit Zelanti believed him to be indifferent or even favourable to the Jesuits. Ganganelli was elected and took the name of Clement XIV.

== Context ==
For a few years Clement XIV tried to placate the opposition to the Jesuits by treating them harshly. He refused to meet the Superior General, Lorenzo Ricci, ordered them not to receive novices, etc. According to Thomas M. McCoog SJ, "the Society was losing its international patrons: Austria, Prussia and Russia annexed sections of Poland at the first (of three) partitions in the summer of 1772; Victor Amadeus III, married to a sister of the king of Spain, ascended the throne of Sardinia in February of 1773. More significant was the loss of Austrian protection: in order to secure a marriage between her daughter Marie Antoinette to the French Dauphin Louis-Auguste in 1770, Empress Maria Theresa promised not to impede Bourbon efforts at suppression although she herself had nothing against the Jesuits".

Cardinal François-Joachim de Pierre de Bernis, whose work for the dissolution won him the appointment of French Ambassador to the Holy See, worked with Clement in securing the delays for which the pope had asked. Samples of a papal statement circulated among Bourbon courts for over a year. The final draft was downgraded from a bull to a less important papal brief. However, the pressure exercised by the Bourbons of Spain, Naples, and France, and the passive attitude and tacit consent of Austria brought the negotiations to an abrupt termination.

The pressure kept building up to the point that Catholic countries were threatening to break away from the Church. The papal bull was issued mainly at the instigation of Joseph Moniño, the Spanish ambassador. Clement XIV ultimately yielded "in the name of peace of the Church and to avoid of secession in Europe" and suppressed the Society of Jesus by the brief Dominus ac Redemptor on 21 July 1773.

== Content ==
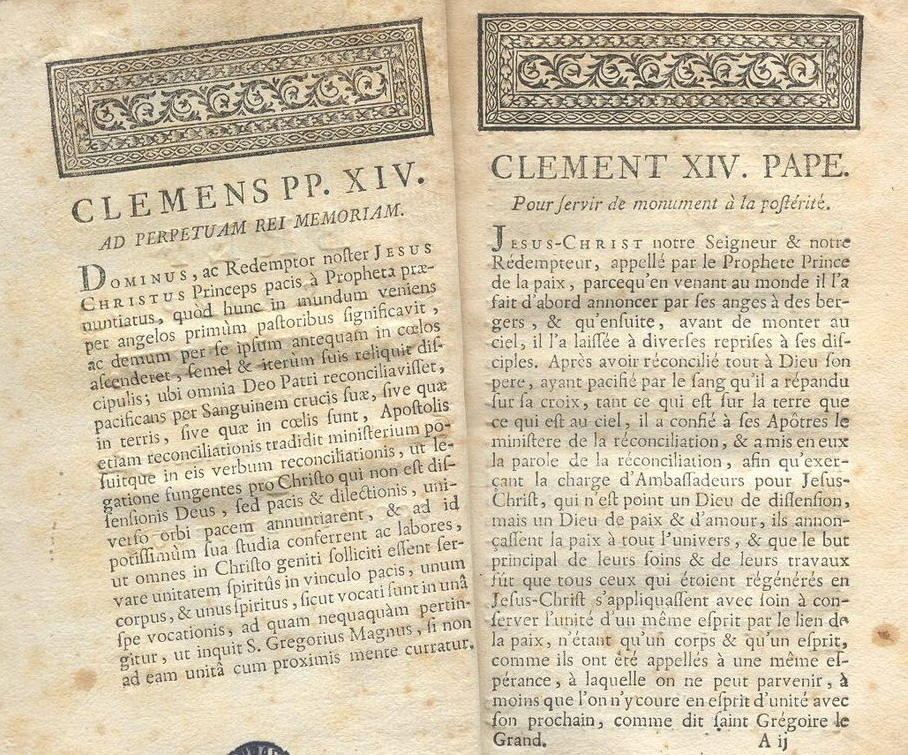
The opening page of Dominus ac Redemptor in Latin and French

The document is forty-five paragraphs long.

In the introductory paragraph Clement XIV gives the tone: Our Lord has come on earth as "Prince of peace". This mission of peace, transmitted to the apostles is a duty of the successors of Saint Peter, a responsibility the pope fulfils by encouraging institutions fostering peace and removing, if need be, others that impede peace. Not just if guilty, even on the broader ground of harmony and tranquillity in the Church, it may be justified to suppress a religious order. He mentions as precedence, Pius V's suppression of the Humiliati in 1571, Urban VIII's elimination of the Regular Order of Sts. Ambrose and Barnabas at the Grove, and Innocent X's suppression of the Order of St. Basil of Armenia.

What follows is a long section in which Clement XIV reviews the reasons which, in his judgment, are calling for the extinction of the Society of Jesus.

1. A long list of charges against the Society is enumerated.
2. He recalls that, in its history, the Society encountered severe criticism.
3. The distress occasioned to earlier popes by clashes among Catholics with regard to Jesuit doctrine is evoked.

In a final, more technical section Clement XIV pronounces the actual sentence of suppression of the Society of Jesus. Some provisions are dictated for the implementation of the brief.

Despite being portrayed as a threat to the peace, the Society is suppressed but not explicitly condemned by the papal brief.

== Execution ==
A second brief Gravissimis ex causis (16 August) established a commission of five cardinals entrusted with the task of informing the Jesuits and handling the many practical problems caused by the suppression. Two days later, a letter of the Cardinal president of the commission ordered all bishops of the Church to proclaim and publish the brief in every Jesuit house, residence or school in the presence of the assembled community of Jesuits. That unusual approach created a good number of problems since there were 22,589 Jesuits, 49 Provinces, 669 Colleges and over 3000 missionaries. Hundreds of schools were closed or transferred to other religious orders or the state.

Non-Catholic countries such as Prussia and Russia forbade the bishops to promulgate the brief and ordered the Jesuits to carry on their academic activities as if nothing had happened.

== See also ==
- 1769 papal conclave

== Bibliography ==
- The full text of the brief, in Latin and French, can be found in Bref de N.S.P. le Pape Clément XIV en date du XXI juillet 1773 portant suppression de l'Ordre régulier dit Société de Jésus, n.d.
- The full text is available in English at the Portal to Jesuit Studies (http://jesuitportal.bc.edu/research/documents/1773_dominusacredemptor/).
- Bangert, William: A History of the Society of Jesus, Saint-Louis, 1972.
- Maryks, Robert Aleksander, and Jonathan Wright. (2015). Jesuit Survival and Restoration, ed. Brill.
