= 1769 conclave =

Election of Catholic Pope Clement XIV

Papal conclave February–May 1769

Dates and location
- 15 February – 19 May 1769; Apostolic Palace, Papal States

Key officials
- Dean: Carlo Cavalchini
- Sub-dean: Federico della Rovere
- Camerlengo: Carlo Rezzonico
- Protopriest: Giacomo Oddi
- Protodeacon: Alessandro Albani

Elected pope
- Giovanni Ganganelli; Name taken: Clement XIV
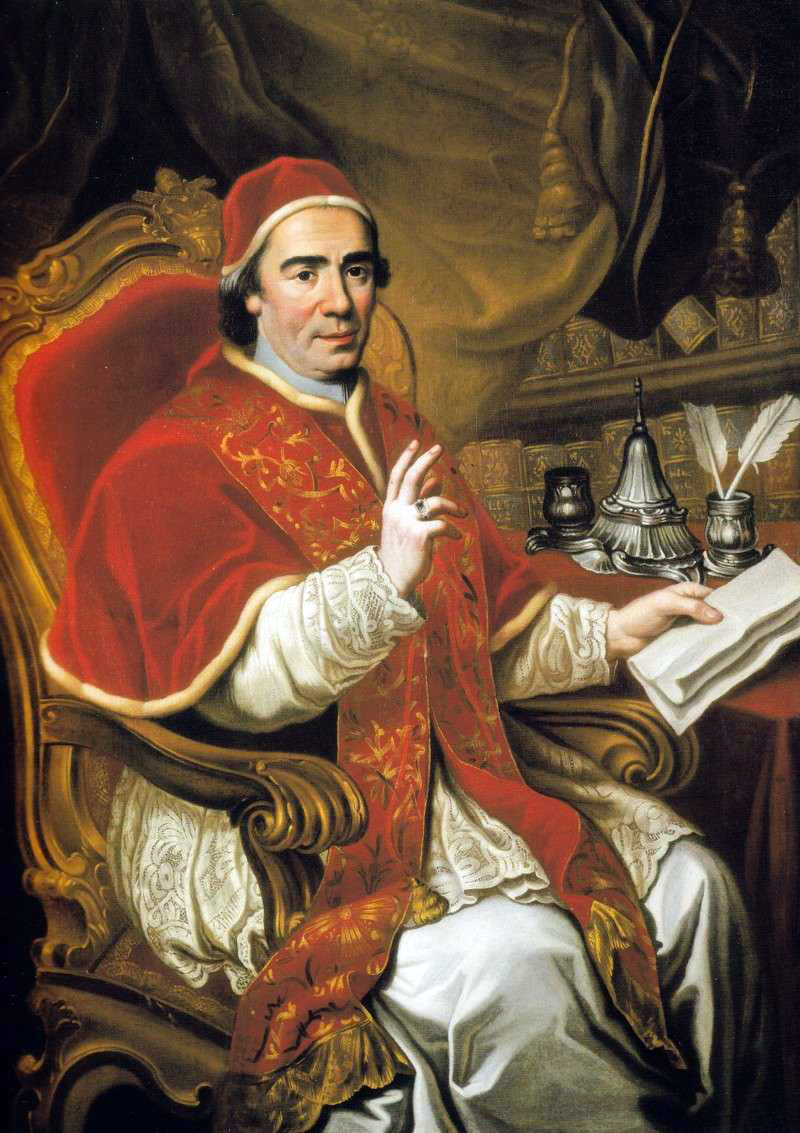

The 1769 papal conclave (15 February – 19 May) was convoked after the death of Pope Clement XIII on 2 February 1769 and ended with the election of Cardinal Giovanni Ganganelli, who took the name Clement XIV.

== Death of Pope Clement XIII ==
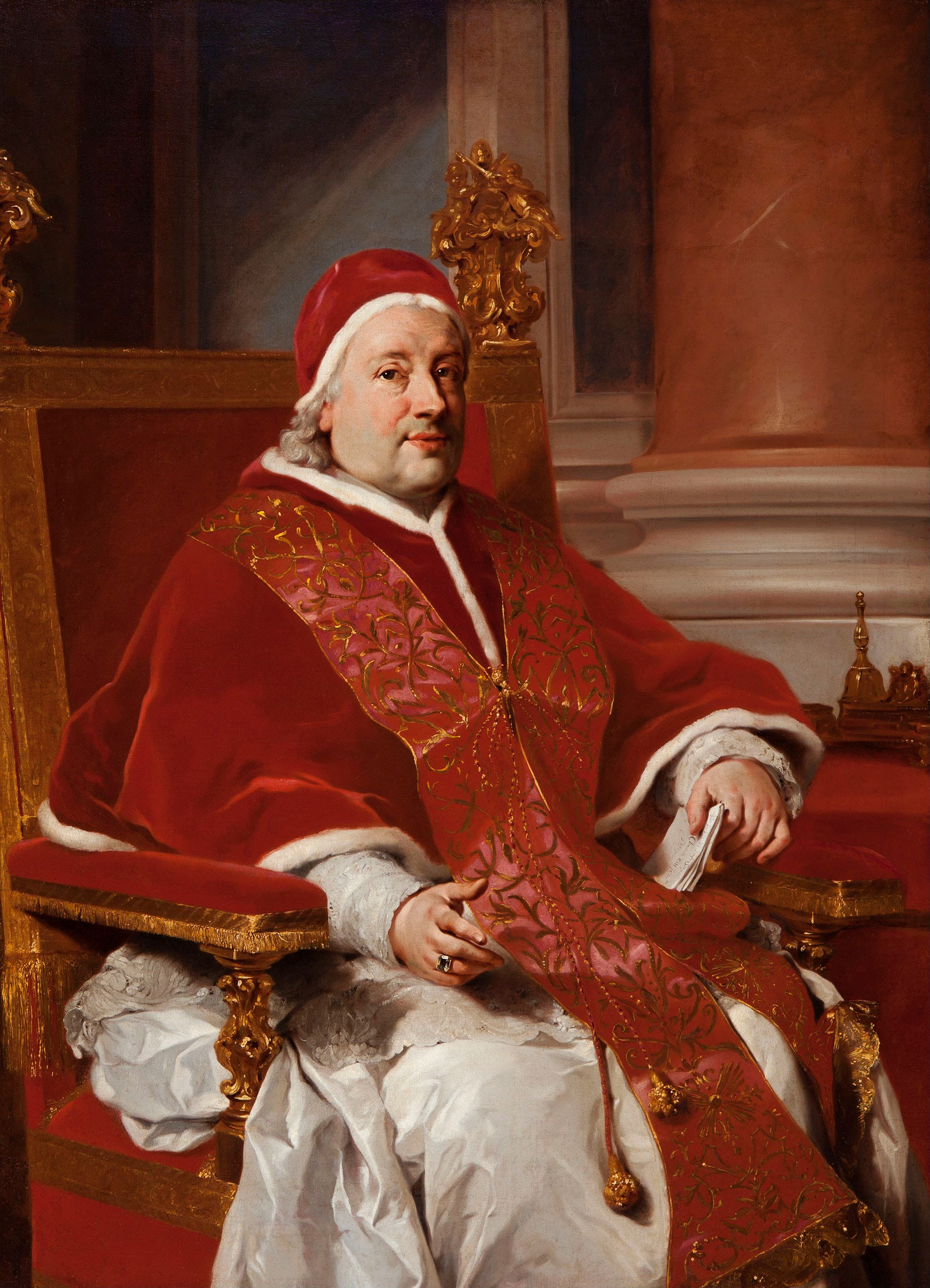
Pope Clement XIII (portrait by Anton Raphael Mengs, c. 1760)

Pope Clement XIII died suddenly on 2 February 1769, a day before the date of the consistory that he had convoked to examine the demands for the general suppression of the Society of Jesus. The various courts under the House of Bourbon and the Kingdom of Portugal (under the House of Braganza) had exerted strong pressure on the Holy See to suppress this order through almost the whole of his pontificate. In 1759, Jesuits were expelled from Portugal and all its possessions, in 1764 from the Kingdom of France, in 1767 from Spain and in 1768 from the Kingdom of Naples, the Kingdom of Sicily and the Duchy of Parma and Piacenza. Clement XIII strongly defended the Society (e.g. in the bull Apostolicum pascendi in 1765), but without success. In January 1769 France and Naples seized the papal territories around Avignon, Benevento, and Pontecorvo to force the pope to issue a decree for the suppression of the order. The sudden death of 75-year-old Clement XIII left this difficult decision to his successor.

== Divisions among the cardinals ==
The papal conclave in 1769 was almost completely dominated by the problem of the Society of Jesus. The Sacred College of Cardinals was divided into two blocs: pro-Jesuits and anti-Jesuits, but several cardinals were neutral. The pro-Jesuit faction, called zelanti, grouped Italian curial cardinals who opposed the secular influences on the Church. Their leaders were Gian Francesco and Alessandro Albani and cardinal-nephew of the deceased pope Carlo Rezzonico. The anti-Jesuit bloc (called also "court faction") grouped crown-cardinals of the Catholic Powers: France, Spain and Naples. Respectively ruled at the time by Louis XV of France, Charles III of Spain and Ferdinand III of Sicily/Ferdinand IV of Naples. In spite of the national divisions they worked together for the main goal – suppression of the Society of Jesus. The Bourbon courts had decided to put the official leadership of this bloc in the hands of the French Cardinal de Bernis. He and his colleagues were instructed to block every pro-Jesuit candidature, even with the official exclusion if necessary. Several cardinals, among them Lorenzo Ganganelli, did not belong to either faction.

The French government was more fastidious than Spanish and Neapolitan. Only three cardinals were considered good candidates: Conti, Durini, and Ganganelli

Out of these 43 cardinals, only 27 or 28 were actually considered papabile, while the remaining 15 were excluded due to their age or health.

== Beginning of the conclave ==
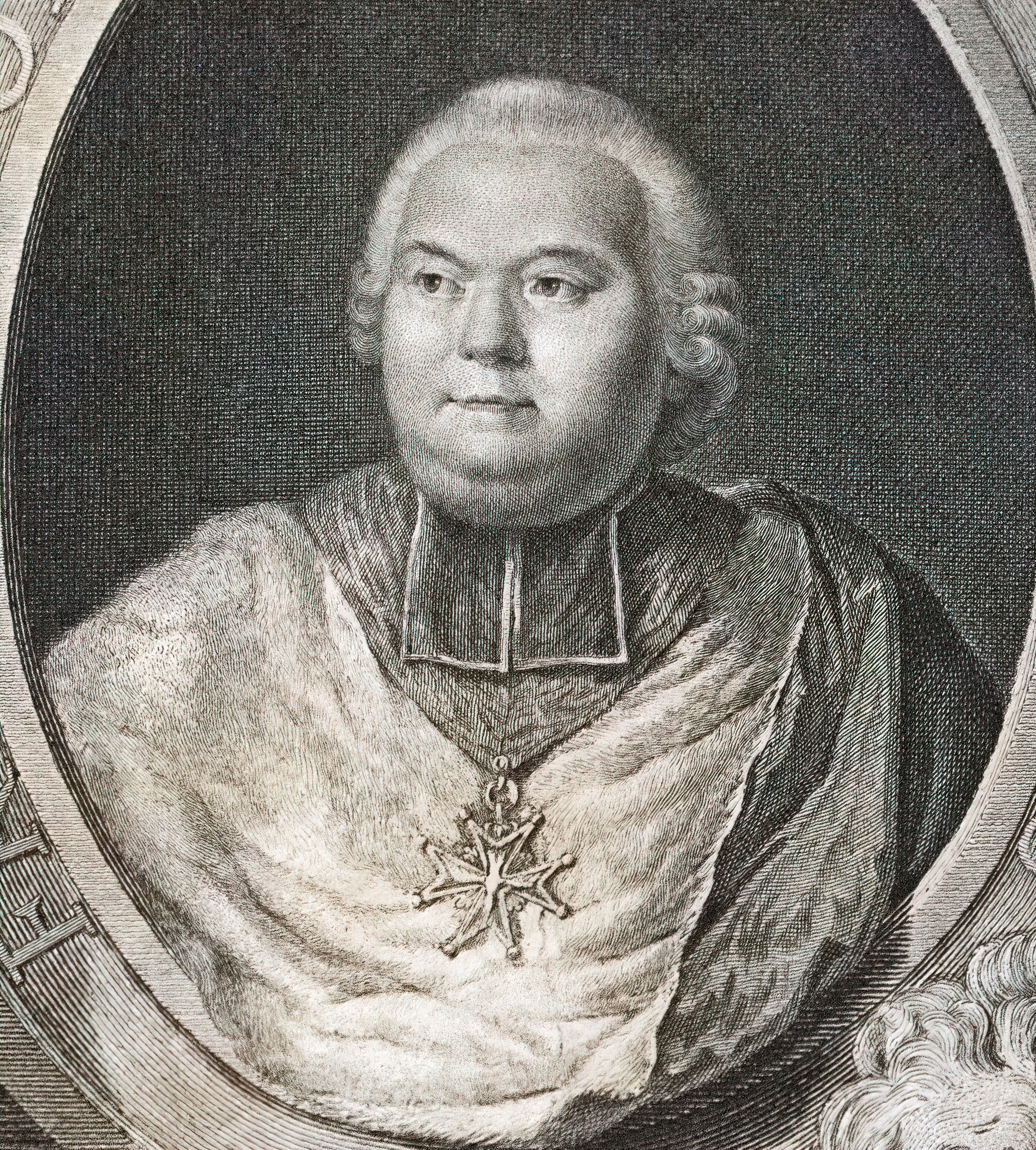
Cardinal de Bernis was one of the leading figures in the conclave.

The conclave began on 15 February 1769. Initially, only 27 cardinals participated. zelanti, taking advantage of the small number of the electors and the absence of the French and Spanish cardinals, tried to achieve a quick election of Cardinal Flavio Chigi. In one ballot, he was only two votes short of being elected. The efforts of the zelanti were met with strong protests from the ambassadors of France and Spain, and Cardinal Orsini, protector of the Kingdom of Naples and the only crown-cardinal present in the early ballots, was able to join some neutral cardinals to block Chigi's candidature.

An unprecedented event was the visit of Joseph II, Holy Roman Emperor, who arrived incognito in Rome on 6 March and was allowed to enter the conclave. He stayed there two weeks, freely debating with the electors. He did not press them but only expressed the wish for the election of a pope who would be able to carry out his duties with the proper respect for the secular rulers.

Cardinal de Bernis entered the conclave at the end of March and took the leadership of the anti-Jesuit faction from the hands of Cardinal Orsini, who could have blocked the zelanti's actions only with the great difficulties. Bernis immediately established a regular correspondence with French ambassador Marquis d'Aubeterre, which was in violation of the fundamental law of the conclave. Ambassadors of France and Spain urged Bernis to insist that the election of the future pope be made to depend on his written engagement to suppress the Jesuits. Bernis refused, answering that demanding from the future pope a written or oral promise to destroy the Society of Jesus would be in violation of the canon law. In spite of this refusal, during the next few weeks Bernis consecutively rejected all candidates proposed by the zelanti as too devoted to the Jesuits. In this way twenty-three out of twenty-eight papabile were eliminated, among them strongly pro-Jesuit Cardinal Fantuzzi, who at some point was very close to achieving election to the papal throne, as well as Cavalchini, Colonna, Stoppani, Pozzobonelli, Sersale, and several others.

The arrival of Spanish cardinals Solis and de la Cerda on 27 April strengthened the anti-Jesuit party. They also violated the law of the conclave by establishing regular correspondence with Spanish ambassador Azpuru. The Spaniards had fewer scruples than Bernis and, supported by Cardinal Malvezzi, took the matter into their own hands. They paid attention to the only friar in the Sacred College, Cardinal Lorenzo Ganganelli, O.F.M.Conv. The attitude of Ganganelli towards the Jesuits was a great mystery – he had been educated by the Jesuits and it was said that he received the red hat at the instance of Father Lorenzo Ricci, general of the Society of Jesus, but during the pontificate of Clement XIII he did not engage himself in the defence of the Order. Cardinal Solis began by sounding him out as to his willingness to give the promise required by the Bourbon princes as an indispensable condition for election. Ganganelli answered that "he recognized in the sovereign pontiff the right to extinguish, with good conscience, the Society of Jesus, provided he observed the canon law; and that it was desirable that the pope should do everything in his power to satisfy the wishes of the Crowns". It is not certain whether it was a written or only an oral promise, but this declaration fully satisfied the ambassadors.

In the same time, the zelanti, also began to incline to give their support to Ganganelli, looking upon him as indifferent or even favourable to the Jesuits. It seems that the attitude of the zelanti was decided by the secret negotiations between their leaders Alessandro and Gian Francesco Albani and the Spanish cardinals. Cardinal de Bernis, the nominal leader of the court faction, probably did not play any role in the appointment of Ganganelli and only followed the instructions of Marquis d'Aubeterre when all had been already known.

== Election of Pope Clement XIV ==
In the final ballot on 19 May 1769, Cardinal Lorenzo Ganganelli was elected to the papacy, receiving all votes except of his own, which he gave to Carlo Rezzonico, nephew of Clement XIII and one of the leaders of the zelanti. He took the name of Clement XIV, in honour of Clement XIII, who had elevated him to the cardinalate.

== Sources ==
- Wilhelm, Joseph (1913). "Pope Clement XIV". In Herbermann, Charles (ed.). Catholic Encyclopedia. New York: Robert Appleton Company.
- Piazzoni, Ambrogio (2003). Historia wyboru papieży [History of Papal Elections] (in Polish). Kraków: Wydawnictwo M. Originally published as: Storia delle elezioni pontificie (in Italian). Casale Monferrato. 2003.
- Dopierała, Kazimierz (1996). Księga papieży [Lexicon summorum pontificum] (in Polish). Poznań: Wyd. Pallotinum.
- Crétineau-Joly, Jacques (1847). Clément XIV et les Jésuites (in French). Paris: Librairie Religieuse de Mellier Frères.
  - "Review of 'Clément XIV et les Jésuites' (1847)". Littell's Living Age. XVIII. Boston: E. Littell & Company: 590–608. July–September 1848.
  - "Review of 'Clément XIV et les Jésuites' (1847)". The English Review. VIII. London: Francis & John Rivington: 1–34. September 1847.
- Artaud de Montor, Alexis François (1911) [c. 1836]. The Lives and Times of the Popes. Vol. 7. The Catholic Publication Society of America.
- Adams, John Paul (July 4, 2015). "Sede Vacante 1769". California State University Northridge.
