= Andrea Corsini (cardinal) =

Italian cardinal

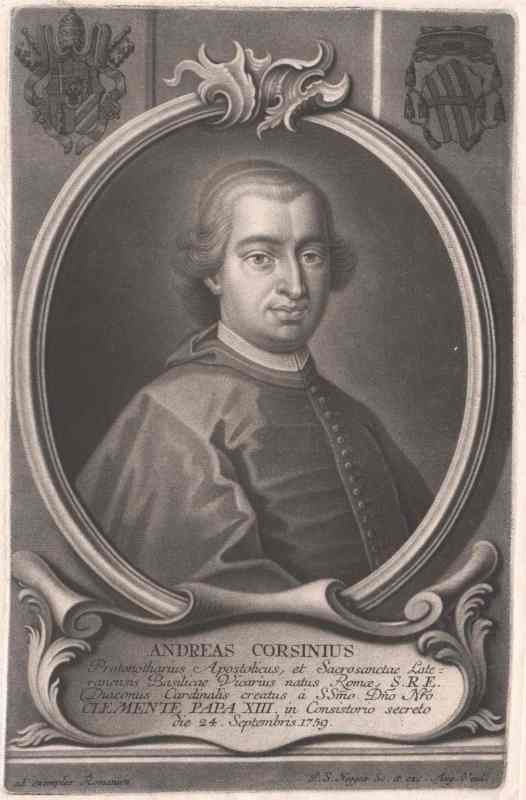
Andrea Corsini (c. 1760)

Andrea Corsini (11 June 1735, Florence – 18 January 1795, Rome) was an Italian cardinal. A great-nephew of pope Clement XII and a nephew of cardinal Neri Maria Corsini. Pope Clement XIII made him a cardinal in the consistory of 24 September 1759. He was camerlengo of the college of cardinals in 1771.

He was made prefect of the Supreme Tribunal of the Apostolic Signatura and member of the commission for the Suppression of the Jesuits in 1773. He was also economic prefect of the Collegio Romano and of the Roman seminary and vicar general for the city of Rome and its district.
