= Zelanti =

Term for Catholic conservatives in various historic eras

In Roman Catholicism, the expression zelanti ([d͡zeˈlan.ti], "Zealous ones") has been applied to conservative members of the clergy and their lay supporters since the thirteenth century. Its specific connotations have shifted with each reapplication of the label. The Latinate term applies to those who show zeal. Zelanti were also known as intransigenti.

In its original thirteenth-century application the zelanti were those members of the Franciscan Order who opposed any changes or relaxation to the Rule formulated by St. Francis of Assisi in 1221 and 1223. In consequence of St. Francis's severe requirements concerning the practice of poverty, his followers divided into two branches, the Zelanti, or Spirituals, and the Relaxati, known later as the Conventuals. The origin of the Fraticelli and the cause of their growth within and without the Franciscan Order must be sought in the history of the zelanti or "Spirituals".

In the eighteenth century the zelanti were the supporters of the Jesuits in the long controversy that led the suppression of the Jesuits in 1767–1773. At the 1774–1775 papal conclave the College of Cardinals was generally divided into two blocs: curial, pro-Jesuit zelanti and political, temporizing faction, anti-Jesuit. Among the zelanti were the Italian curial cardinals who opposed secular influences on the Church. The second faction included crown-cardinals of the Catholic courts. These two blocs were in no way homogeneous. Zelanti were divided into moderate and radical factions.

During the papacy of Pius VII the zelanti were more radically reactionary than the politicani and wanted a highly centralised Church with vehement opposition to the secularising reforms that had resulted in France from the Revolution, which liberals were intent on spreading to the Papal States. The politicani, though not liberal, were much more moderate and favoured a conciliatory approach to dealing with the problems new ideologies and the incipient Industrial Revolution were creating in the early nineteenth century. The zelanti and the moderates featured in the 1823 papal conclave and the 1829 papal conclave.

In the 20th century, Rafael Merry del Val (Pope Pius X’s secretary of state) was a prominent zelante.

== See also ==
Carlo Agostino Fabroni
