= Cardinals created by Clement XII =

Catholic appointments from 1730 to 1739

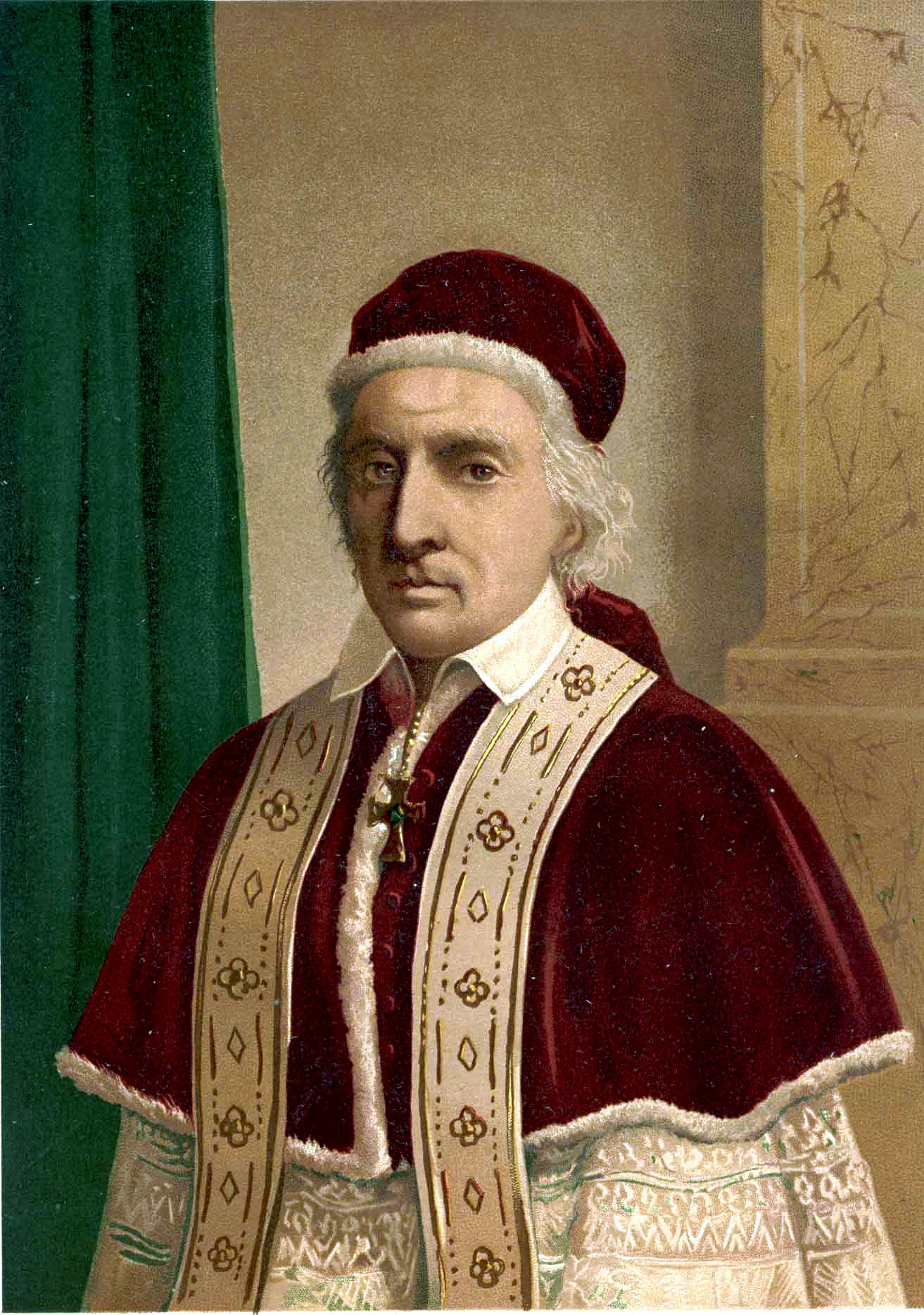
Pope Clement XII (1652–1740).

Pope Clement XII (r. 1730–1740) created 35 cardinals in 15 consistories.

== 14 August 1730 ==
1. Neri Maria Corsini

== 2 October 1730 ==
1. Alessandro Aldobrandini
2. Girolamo Grimaldi
3. Bartolomeo Massei
4. Bartolomeo Ruspoli

== 24 September 1731 ==
1. Vincenzo Bichi
2. Sinibaldo Doria
3. Giuseppe Firrao
4. Antonio Saverio Gentili
5. Giovanni Antonio Guadagni

== 1 October 1732 ==
1. Troiano Acquaviva d'Aragona
2. Agapito Mosca

== 2 March 1733 ==
1. Domenico Riviera

== 28 September 1733 ==
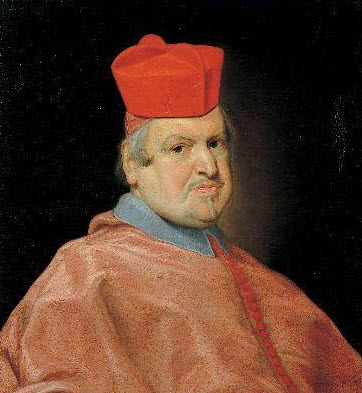
Giovanni Battista Spínola (1681–1752), made a cardinal on September 28, 1733.

1. Marcello Passari
2. Giovanni Battista Spínola

== 24 March 1734 ==
1. Pompeio Aldrovandi
2. Serafino Cenci
3. Pietro Maria Pieri
4. Giacomo Lanfredini

== 17 January 1735 ==
1. Giuseppe Spinelli

== 19 December 1735 ==
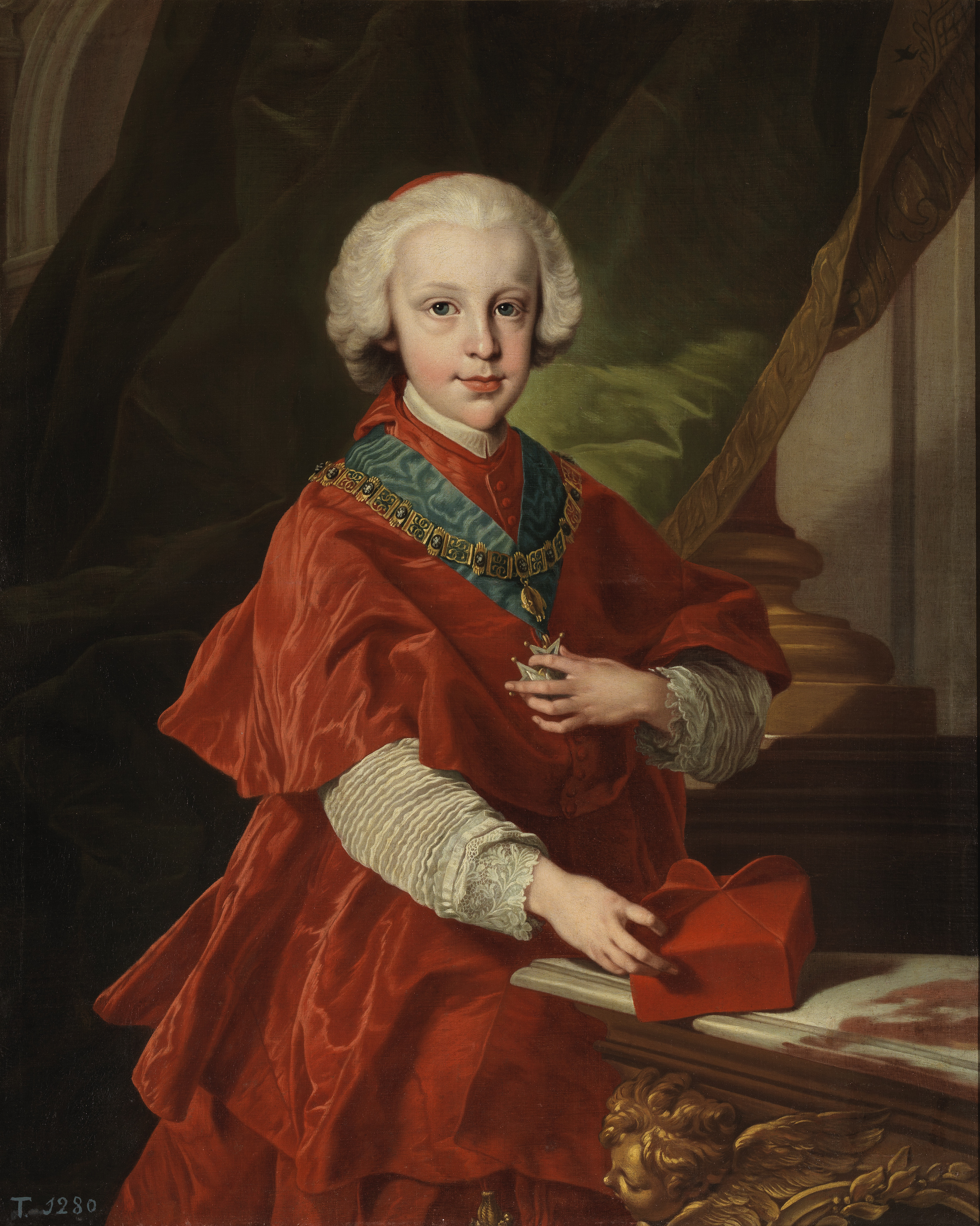
Infante Luis, Count of Chinchón (1727–85), made a cardinal on December 19, 1735.

1. Infante Luis, Count of Chinchón

== 20 December 1737 ==
1. Tomás de Almeida
2. Henri-Osvald de la Tour d'Auvergne de Bouillon
3. Joseph Dominicus von Lamberg
4. Gaspar de Molina y Oviedo
5. Jan Aleksander Lipski
6. Rainiero d'Elci
7. Carlo Rezzonico

== 23 June 1738 ==
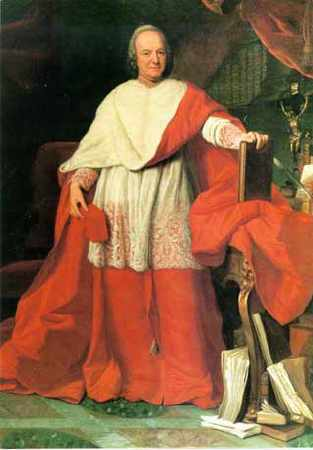
Domenico Silvio Passionei (1682–1761), made a cardinal on June 23, 1738.

1. Domenico Silvio Passionei

== 19 December 1738 ==
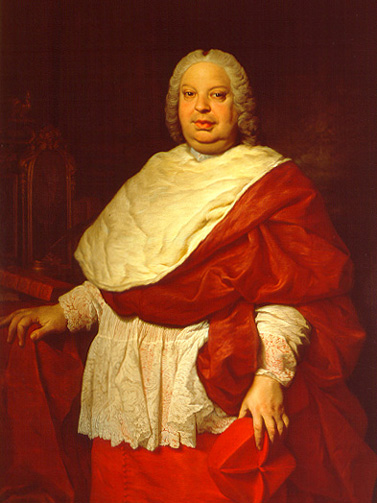
Silvio Valenti Gonzaga (1690–1756), made a cardinal on December 19, 1738.

1. Silvio Valenti Gonzaga

== 23 February 1739 ==
1. Carlo Gaetano Stampa
2. Pierre Guérin de Tencin

== 15 June 1739 ==
1. Marcellino Corio

== 30 September 1739 ==
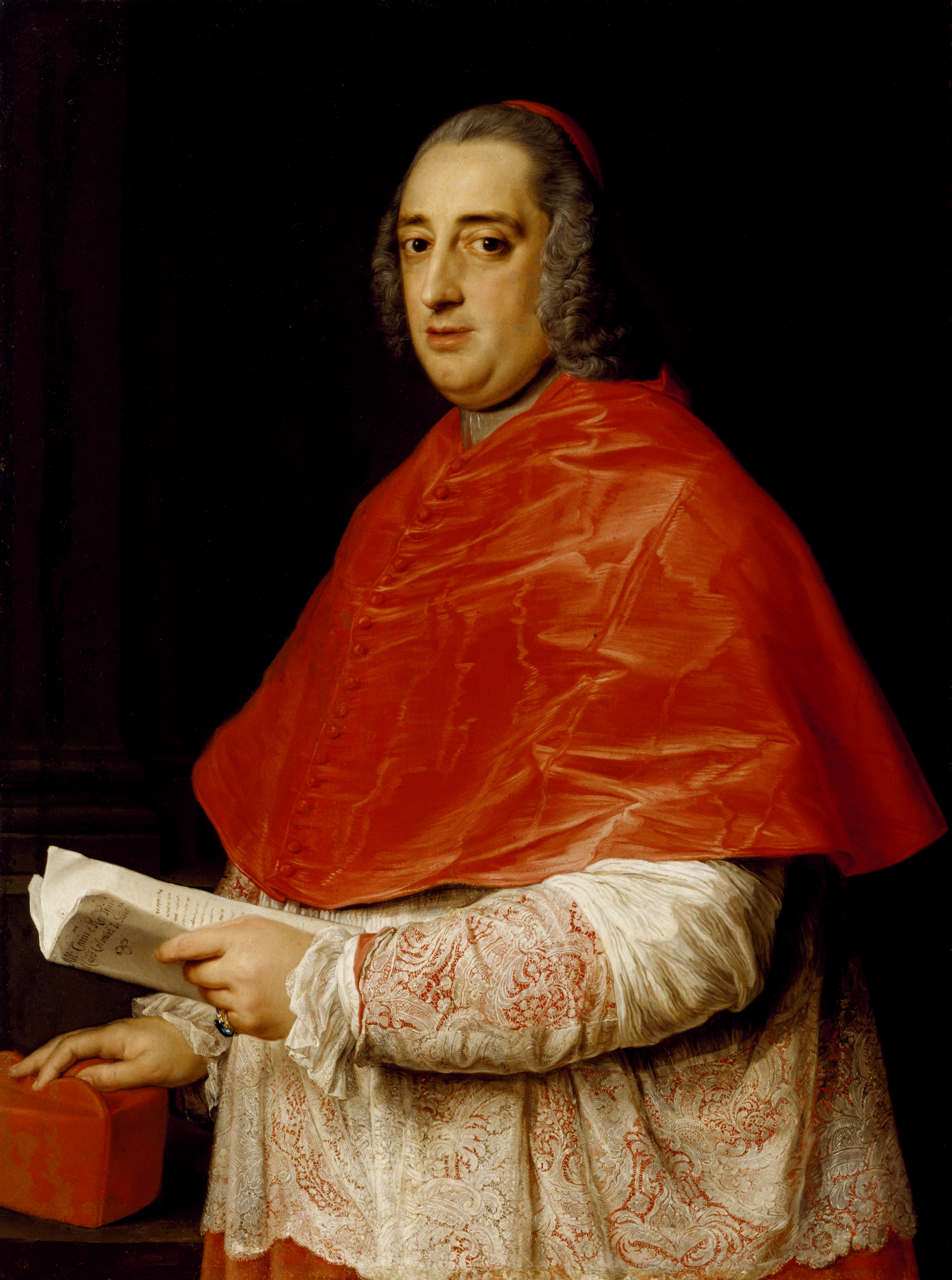
Prospero Colonna di Sciarra (1707–65), made a cardinal on September 30, 1739.

1. Prospero Colonna di Sciarra
2. Carlo Maria Sacripante
