= 1740 conclave =

Election of Catholic Pope Benedict XIV

Papal conclave February–August 1740

Dates and location
- 18 February – 17 August 1740; Apostolic Palace, Papal States

Key officials
- Dean: Pietro Ottoboni; Tommaso Ruffo
- Sub-dean: Tommaso Ruffo; Lodovico della Mirandola
- Camerlengo: Annibale Albani
- Protopriest: Armand de Rohan-Soubise
- Protodeacon: Lorenzo Altieri

Elected pope
- Prospero Lambertini; Name taken: Benedict XIV
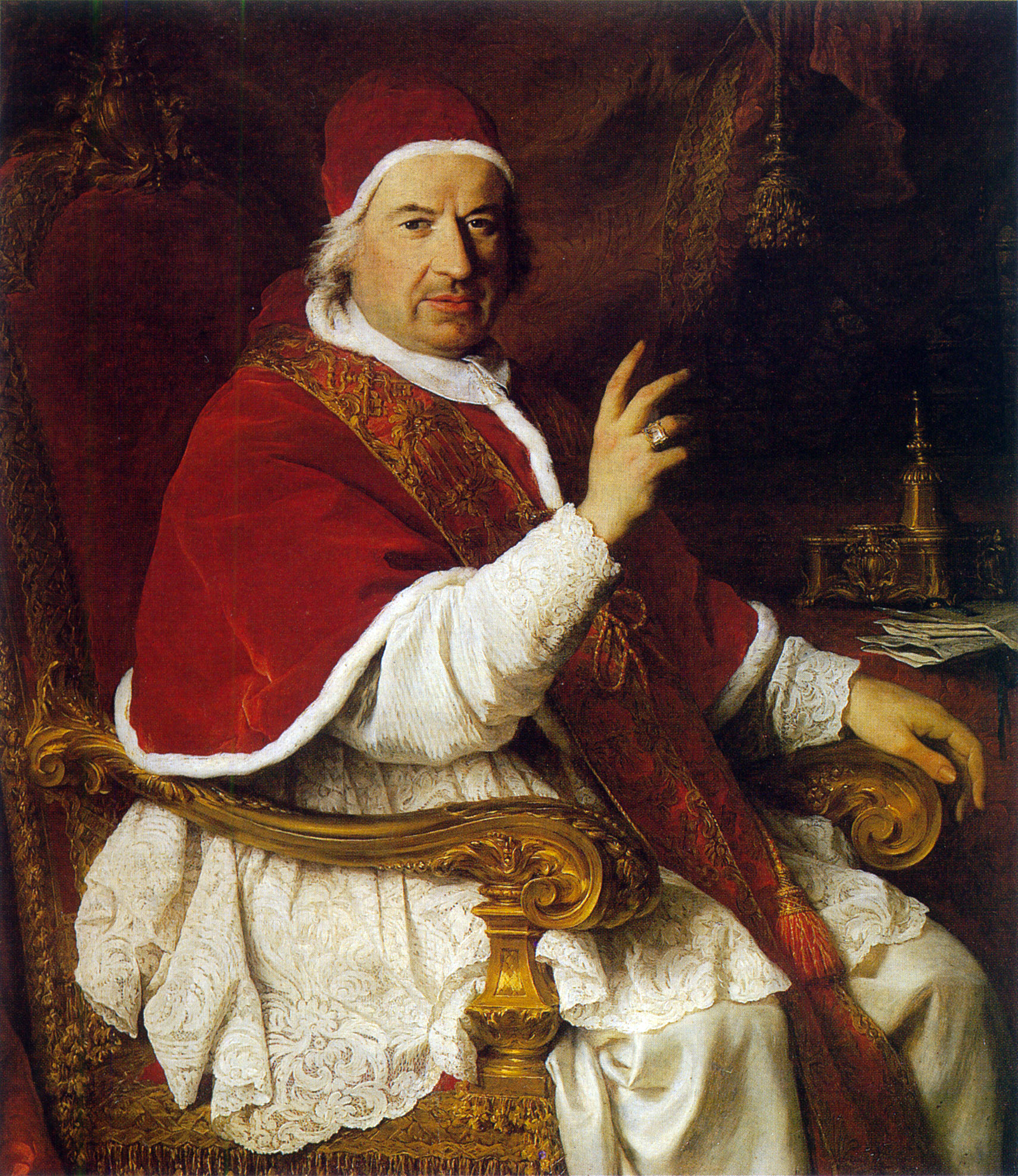

The 1740 papal conclave (18 February – 17 August) was convoked after the death of Pope Clement XII on 6 February 1740 and was one of the longest papal conclaves since the 13th century.

The initial favourite to succeed as pope, the elderly Pietro Ottoboni (1667–1740), Dean of the College of Cardinals, died shortly after the beginning of the conclave, and cardinals loyal to the House of Bourbon repeatedly proposed Pompeo Aldrovandi, but eventually had to accept that he could not secure two-thirds of the votes.

After six months, other possible candidates had also failed, and Cardinal Prospero Lambertini, the archbishop of Bologna, who had been a cardinal since 9 December 1726, was elected. He took the name Benedict XIV.

== Early candidates ==
The conclave began on 18 February 1740, following the funeral of Clement XII, and lasted for six months.

At the outset, only thirty-two cardinals entered into the conclave, in which there was an expectation that the elderly Pietro Ottoboni (1667–1740), a Cardinal for more than fifty years and Dean of the Sacred College of Cardinals, would be chosen to succeed Clement XII. However, opposition to Ottoboni was raised because of his protective relationship with France. After a few days he was taken seriously ill, left the conclave on 25 February, and died on 29 February. Ottoboni's place as Dean was taken by Tommaso Ruffo, vice-dean of the Sacred College.

As more cardinals arrived in Rome and entered into the conclave, a group of the French formed an alliance with the Austrians and with the Spanish cardinals from Naples and Tuscany. The cardinals loyal to the Bourbons proposed the name of Pompeo Aldrovandi, but he fell just short of securing the two-thirds majority required. For forty days, his nomination was voted on unsuccessfully before it became clear he could not be elected.

There was considerable and lengthy confusion, with a series of names advanced, all of whom failed to find the necessary level of support. After long deliberation, Cardinal Lambertini, a canon lawyer, was proposed as a compromise candidate, and he is reported to have said to the College of Cardinals, "If you wish to elect a saint, choose Gotti; a statesman, Aldrovandi; an honest man, me." This appears to have assisted his cause, which also benefited from his reputation for deep learning, gentleness, wisdom, and conciliation in policy.

== Election of Benedict XIV ==
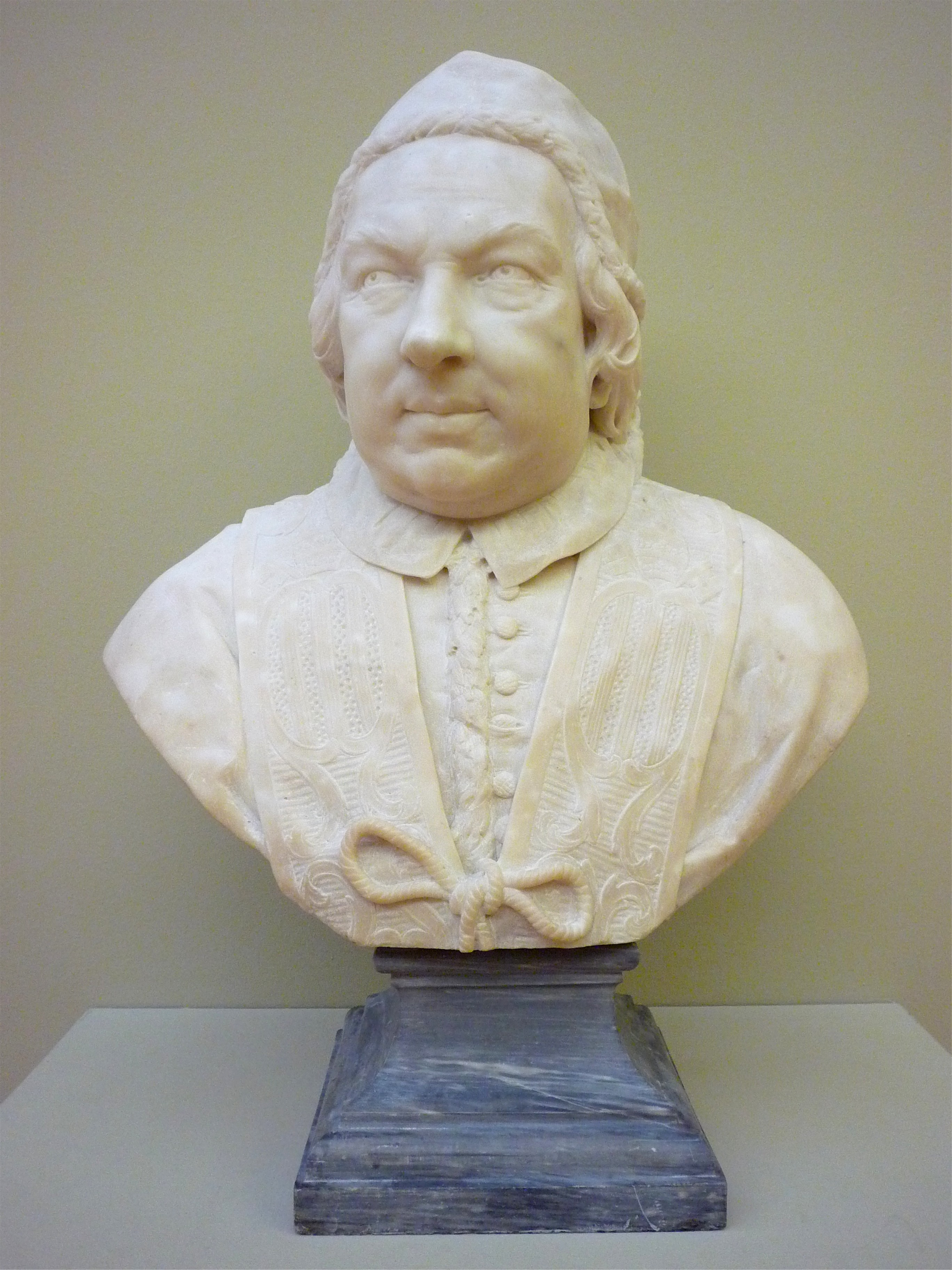
Benedict by Bracci

In the words of one historian, the College of Cardinals was

"...too sensible of their own weakness to risk giving offense to the neighboring courts, At length they fixed on a man who was at least unlikely to be offensive, as he had never in his life been engaged in diplomatic affairs, either as ambassador or nuncio. This was Prospero Lambertini, a native of Bologna.

On 17 August in the evening, Lambertini was elected Pope, receiving the ballots of more than the required two-thirds of the fifty-one Cardinals present. Lambertini accepted his election and took the name of Benedict XIV in honour of his friend and patron Pope Benedict XIII. It had been one of the longer conclaves, though far from the longest. (Note: The longest papal election was that election of 1268–1271 which had lasted almost three years, compared with more than two years for that of 1292–1294 and almost a year for the 1287–1288 election. This conclave lasted a few days longer than the election of 1277.) Benedict was crowned a few days later in the loggia of the Vatican Basilica.

== Other witnesses ==
Giovanni Angelo Braschi, later Pope Pius VI, attended the conclave while still a layman as assistant to Cardinal Ruffo.

The young Horace Walpole, who was in Rome at the time, attempted to attend the coronation but gave up because he found the waiting interminable. He wrote to his friend and cousin Conway, "I am sorry to have lost the sight of the Pope's coronation, but I might have staid for seeing it till I had been old enough to be Pope myself."

== List of cardinal electors ==
=== List of participants ===
Of the sixty-eight cardinals living at the death of Pope Clement XII, four died during the sede vacante and fifty-one took part in the final ballot.:

- Pietro Ottoboni (1667–1740), Created a Cardinal 7 November 1689, bishop of Ostia and Velletri, Dean of the Sacred College of Cardinals; he was taken ill during the conclave, left it on 25 February, and died on 29 February 1740.
- Tommaso Ruffo (1663–1753), a Cardinal since 17 May 1706, bishop of Porto e Santa Rufina; he succeeded Ottoboni as Dean of the College of Cardinals.
- Annibale Albani (1682–1751), a Cardinal since 23 December 1711, bishop of Sabina
- Lodovico Picco della Mirandola (1668–1743), a Cardinal since 18 May 1712, bishop of Albano
- Pier Marcelino Corradini (1658–1743), also a Cardinal since 18 May 1712, bishop of Frascati
- Armand Gaston Maximilien de Rohan (1674–1749), also a Cardinal since 18 May 1712, bishop of Strasbourg
- Carlo Maria Marini (1677–1747), a Cardinal since 29 May 1715
- Thomas Philip Wallrad de Hénin-Liétard d'Alsace (1679–1759), a Cardinal since 29 November 1719, archbishop of Mechelen
- Luis Antonio Belluga y Moncada (1662–1743), also a Cardinal since 29 November 1719
- Alessandro Albani (1692–1779), a Cardinal since 16 July 1721
- Giambattista Altieri the younger (1673–1740), a Cardinal since 11 September 1724, bishop of Palestrina. He died during the conclave, on 12 March 1740, of apoplexy, having suffered such an attack three years earlier.
- Vincenzo Petra (1662–1747), a Cardinal since 20 November 1724
- Niccolò Coscia (1682–1755), a Cardinal since 11 June 1725
- Niccolò del Giudice (1660–1743), also a Cardinal since 11 June 1725
- Angelo Maria Quirini (1680–1755), a Cardinal since 9 December 1726, bishop of Brescia.
- Francesco Antonio Finy (1669–1743), also a Cardinal since 9 December 1726
- Prospero Lambertini (1675–1758), also a Cardinal since 9 December 1726, archbishop of Bologna; elected Pope by the conclave.
- Niccolò Maria Lercari (1675–1757), also a Cardinal since 9 December 1726
- Sigismund von Kollonitsch (1677–1751), a Cardinal since 26 November 1727, archbishop of Vienna
- Philip Ludwig von Sinzendorf (1699–1747), also a Cardinal since 26 November 1727, bishop of Györ
- Vincenzo Ludovico Gotti (1664–1742), OP, a Cardinal since 30 April 1728
- Pierluigi Carafa the younger (1677–1755), a Cardinal since 20 September 1728
- Giuseppe Accoramboni (1672–1747), also a Cardinal since 20 September 1728
- Camillo Cibo (1681–1743), a Cardinal since 23 March 1729
- Francesco Borghese (1697–1759), a Cardinal since 6 July 1729
- Carlo Vincenzo Ferreri OP (1682–1742), also a Cardinal since 6 July 1729, bishop of Alexandria.
- Neri Maria Corsini (1685–1770), a Cardinal since 14 August 1730
- Bartolomeo Massei (1663–1745), a Cardinal since 2 October 1730
- Bartolomeo Ruspoli (1697–1741), also a Cardinal since 2 October 1730
- Vincenzo Bichi (1668–1750), a Cardinal since 24 September 1731
- Giuseppe Firrao (1670–1744), also a Cardinal since 24 September 1731, archbishop-bishop of Aversa.
- Antonio Saverio Gentili (1681–1753), also a Cardinal since 24 September 1731
- Giovanni Antonio Guadagni, OCD (1674–1759), also a Cardinal since 24 September 1731, bishop of Arezzo.
- Troiano Acquaviva d'Aragona (1695–1747), a Cardinal since 1 October 1732
- Agapito Mosca (1678–1760), also a Cardinal since 1 October 1732
- Domenico Riviera (1671–1752), a Cardinal since 2 March 1733
- Marcello Passari (1678–1741), a Cardinal since 28 September 1733
- Giovanni Battista Spinola (1681–1752), a Cardinal since 28 September 1733
- Pompeo Aldrovandi (1668–1752), a Cardinal since 24 March 1734
- Pietro Maria Pieri, OSM (1676–1743), also a Cardinal since 24 March 1734
- Giacomo Lanfredini (1680–1741), also a Cardinal since 24 March 1734
- Giuseppe Spinelli (1694–1763), a Cardinal since 17 January 1735, archbishop of Naples.
- Henri-Osvald de la Tour d'Auvergne de Bouillon (1671–1747), a Cardinal since 20 December 1737, archbishop of Vienne
- Rainiero d'Elci (1670–1761), also a Cardinal since 20 December 1737, archbishop of Ferrara.
- Carlo Rezzonico the elder (1693–1769), also a Cardinal since 20 December 1737; later Pope Clement XIII
- Domenico Passionei (1682–1761), a Cardinal since 23 June 1738
- Silvio Valenti Gonzaga (1690–1756), legate in Bologna, a Cardinal since 19 December 1738
- Carlo Gaetano Stampa (1667–1742), a Cardinal since 23 February 1739, archbishop of Milan
- Pierre-Guérin de Tencin (1680–1758), also a Cardinal since 23 February 1739, archbishop of Embrun
- Marcellino Corio (1664–1742), a Cardinal since 15 July 1739
- Carlo Maria Sacripante (1689–1758), a Cardinal since 30 September 1739
- Prospero Colonna (1672–1743), also a Cardinal since 30 September 1739

=== List of absentees ===
Fourteen cardinals were absent throughout the conclave:

- Lorenzo Altieri (1671–1741), a Cardinal since 13 November 1690, brother of Cardinal Giambattista Altieri (1673–1740), who died during the conclave.
- Nuno da Cunha e Ataíde (1664–1750), a Cardinal since 18 May 1712; travelled to Rome for the conclave of 1721, but arrived after it had elected Pope Innocent XIII; did not participate in the conclaves of 1724, 1730, or 1740.
- Melchior de Polignac (1661–1742), a French Cardinal, diplomat, and Neo-Latin poet
- Benedetto Erba Odescalchi (1679–1740), a Cardinal since 30 January 1713, Archbishop of Milan, he resigned the government of his archdiocese in 1736 due to an apoplexy, and died on 13 December 1740.
- Giulio Alberoni (1664–1752), an Italian Cardinal and statesman in the service of Philip V of Spain
- Léon Potier de Gesvres (1656–1744), a Cardinal since 29 November 1719 and archbishop of Bourges since 1694; he never went to Rome to receive the red hat and did not take part in any conclaves.
- Damian Hugo Philipp von Schönborn, bishop of Speyer and Konstanz.
- André-Hercule de Fleury (1653–1743), first counsellor of state of Louis XV of France
- João da Mota e Silva (1685–1747), a Cardinal since 26 November 1727; he never went to Rome; from 1736 he was principal counsellor to King John V of Portugal.
- Infante Luis, Count of Chinchón (1727–1785), Infante of Spain; the youngest son of Philip V of Spain, and a Cardinal since 19 December 1735, when he was aged eight, he received the red biretta in Madrid in 1736; at the beginning of the conclave he was still only twelve and was in Spain.
- Joseph Dominicus von Lamberg, bishop of Passau.
- Tomás de Almeida, patriarch of Lisbon.
- Gaspar de Molina y Oviedo, OESA, bishop of Málaga.
- Jan Aleksander Lipski (1690–1746), a Cardinal since 20 December 1737, bishop of Krákow; he never went to Rome to receive the red hat.

== Sources ==
- Salvador Miranda, List of participants of conclave, 1740 at fiu.edu
- Biography of Pope Clement XII, Papal Library
- Ludwig von Pastor, History of the Popes, vol. XXXVI (London, 1941)
