= Pier Luigi Carafa (1677–1755) =

Italian cardinal

His Eminence Pier Luigi Cardinal Carafa
- Dean of the College of Cardinals
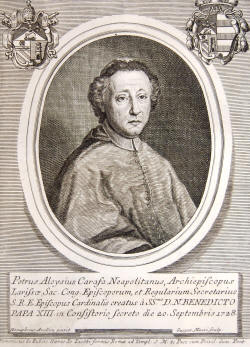
- Coat-of-arms of Carafa Family
- Diocese: Former Bishop of Ostia

Orders
- Ordination: 19 February 1713
- Consecration: 1713 (Date Unknown)
- Created cardinal: 20 September 1728
- Rank: Cardinal-Bishop

Personal details
- Born: Pier Luigi Carafa, Junior; 4 July 1677 Naples, Italy
- Died: 15 December 1755 (aged 78) Rome, Italy
- Buried: Sant'Andrea delle Fratte
- Denomination: Roman Catholic
- Education: Sapienza University of Rome

Pier Luigi Carafa, Junior (4 July 1677 – 15 December 1755) (sometimes spelled as Caraffa) was an Italian cardinal from the famous Neapolitan family of Italian nobles, clergy, and men of arts. He served the papacy as Camerlengo of the Sacred College of Cardinals and as Dean of same College. He is currently buried at Sant'Andrea delle Fratte in Rome.

== Early Ecclesiastic Career ==
Born into an illustrious house of Naples, the family of Pier Luigi was not unaccustomed to high-ranking prelates. Other cardinals in the family consisted of Filippo Carafa della Serra; Oliviero Carafa; Gianvincenzo Carafa; Carlo Carafa; Diomede Carafa; Alfonso Carafa; Antonio Carafa; Giovanni Pietro Carafa (later Pope Paul IV); Pier Luigi Carafa, Senior; Carlo Carafa della Spina; Fortunato Ilario Carafa della Spina; Francesco Carafa della Spina di Traetto; Marino Carafa di Belvedere; and Domenico Carafa della Spina di Traetto. Also, a member of the family was Gregorio Carafa, Grand Master of the Order of St. John.

Pier Luigi was born on 4 July 1677 in Naples. He attended La Sapienza University in Rome where he was awarded a doctorate in both laws (civil and canon) on 19 October 1694. He was then ordained a deacon on 22 January 1713 and a priest on 19 February 1713.

== Episcopal career ==
Just over one month after his ordination to the priesthood, Pier Luigi was elected titular archbishop of Larissa in Thessalia on 27 March 1713 and then made an Assistant at the Pontifical Throne on 16 April 1713. He was appointed as Nuncio in Tuscany on 20 July 1713, a position in which he served for just under four years. On 12 April 1717, Archbishop Carafa was appointed Secretary of the Sacred Congregation for the Propagation of the Faith and then, in 1724, as Secretary of the Sacred Congregation of Bishops as well a Consultor of the Supreme Sacred Congregation of the Roman and Universal Inquisition.

== Cardinalate career ==
Archbishop Carafa was created cardinal-priest in the consistory of 20 September 1728 and received the red galero and the title of San Lorenzo in Panisperna, where he was installed on 15 November 1728. He was then made Abbot commendatario of Ferrara in 1729. He participated in the conclave of 1730, where Clement XII was elected pope. On 11 February 1737, Cardinal Carafa was named Camerlengo of the Sacred College of Cardinals. Upon the death of Pope Clement XII, Cardinal Carfa participated in the papal conclave of 1740, where Benedict XIV was elected. He was appointed as a cardinal-bishop on 16 September 1740 and was named to the suburbicarian see of Albano. Then, on 15 November 1751, he was appointed to the suburbicarian see of Porto-Santa Rufina. He was then named the Vice-dean of the Sacred College of Cardinals in 1751, and then named Dean of the Sacred College of Cardinals on 9 April 1753 and appointed to the suburbicarian see of Ostia and Velletri, a position he held until his death on 15 December 1755, at 78 years of age.

== Death and Entombment ==
Pier Luigi Cardinal Carafa died on 15 December 1755, at 8:30 p.m. in Rome. His remains were transferred the following day to the church of Sant'Andrea delle Fratte in Rome where the capella paplis took place on 18 December 1755, and he was buried in the chapel of Saint Francis de Sales.

On the funerary plaque of Cardinal Pier Luigi Carafa in the chapel of Saint Francis de Sales, the following in Latin is inscribed:

SACELLUM • VBI • MORTALES • EXVVIAE • CARD. PETRI • ALOISII • CARAFA • PATRONI • CONDITAE • ASSERVANTVR • SQVALENTI • VETVSTATE • OBSITVM • DOMINICVS • IACOBINI • ARCHIEP • TYRIORVM • S. CONSILII • CHRISTIANO • NOMINI • PROPAGANDO • LAVREENTIVS • SALVATI • S. CONSESSVS • TRIDENT • CONCILIO • INTERPRETANDO • A. SECRETIS • HEREDITATIS • QVAM • ILLE • IN • PIOS • VSVS • RELIQVIT • CVRATORES • EX • TESTAMENTO • ANNO • MDCCCXCI • INSTAVRATVM • EXORNARVNT

== Burial Chapel ==
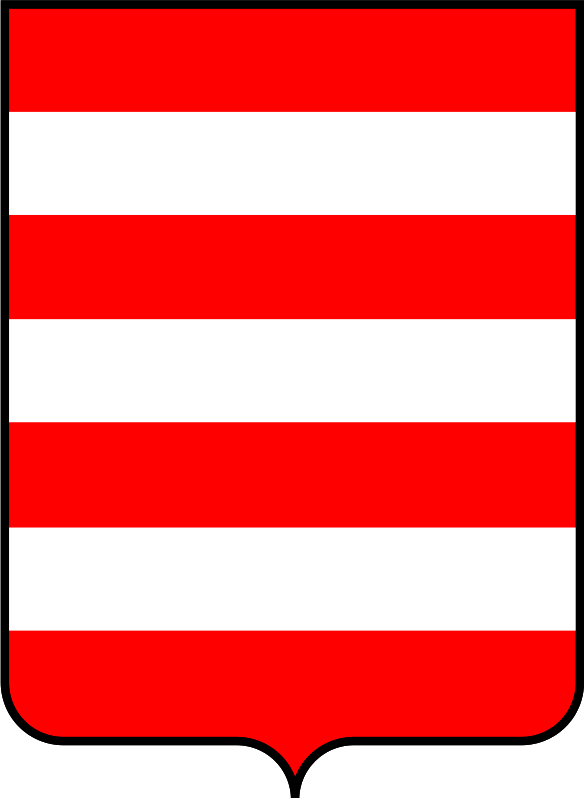
Stemma of Carafa Family

Pier Luigi Cardinal Carafa is entombed in the chapel of Saint Francis de Sales in the Church of Sant'Andrea delle Fratte in Rome. The full name of the chapel is the chapel of "Saint Francis de Sales and Jeanne de Valois." The chapel was granted to Cardinal Carafa in 1753 who dedicated it to Saint Charles Borromeo and Jeanne de Valois, queen of France. The Cardinal himself donated the altarpiece by Marcantonio Romoli. The artwork within the chapel includes: the altarpiece, Saint Francis of Paula Gives the Cordon of the Order to St. Francis de Sales and St. Jeanne de Valois by Marcantonio Romoli and on the left wall, Funeral Monument of Cardinal Carafa by Paolo Posi and Pietro Bracci.

== Books ==
- Ginzel, Joseph Augustin (1840). Legatio apostolica Petri Aloysii Carafæ, episcopi Tricaricensis, sedente Urbano VIII. pontifice maximo, ad tractum Rheni et ad provincias inferioris Germaniæ ab anno 1624 usque ad annum 1634 (in German and Latin). Würzburg: sumptibus Stahelianis(IS); Stahel.
- Iserloh, Erwin; Gatz, Erwin (1995). Nuntiaturberichte aus Deutschland : nebst ergänzenden Aktenstücken. Die Kölner Nuntiatur : 7. Nuntius Pier Luigi Carafa : 4. (1633 Januar - 1634 November) : mit Nachträgen (in German and Latin). Paderborn: Schöningh. ISBN 978-3-506-76132-3.

Catholic Church titles
Preceded by Giovanni Battista Anguisciola	Titular Archbishop of Larissa in Thessalia; 1713–1728	Succeeded by Troiano Acquaviva d'Aragona
Preceded by Gerolamo Archinto	Apostolic Nuncio to Florence; 1713–1717	Succeeded by Gaetano Stampa
Preceded by	Secretary of the Congregation for Propagation of the Faith; 1717–1724	Succeeded by
Preceded by	Secretary of the Congregation of Bishops and Regulars; 1724–1728	Succeeded by
Preceded by Lorenzo Cozza	Cardinal-Priest of San Lorenzo in Panisperna; 1728–1737	Succeeded by Vincenzo Bichi
Preceded by Luis Antonio Belluga y Moncada	Cardinal-Priest of Santa Prisca; 1737–1740	Succeeded by Silvio Valenti Gonzaga
Preceded by Lodovico Pico Della Mirandola	Cardinal-Bishop of Albano; 1740–1751	Succeeded by Giovanni Battista Spínola
Preceded by Annibale Albani	Cardinal-Bishop of Porto e Santa Rufina; 1751–1753	Succeeded by Raniero d'Elci
Preceded by Tommaso Ruffo	Bishop of Ostia & Dean of the College of Cardinals; 1753–1755	Succeeded by Raniero d'Elci
