= Tommaso Ruffo =

Italian cardinal (1663–1753)

His Eminence Tommaso Ruffo
- Cardinal-Bishop of Ostia e Velletri
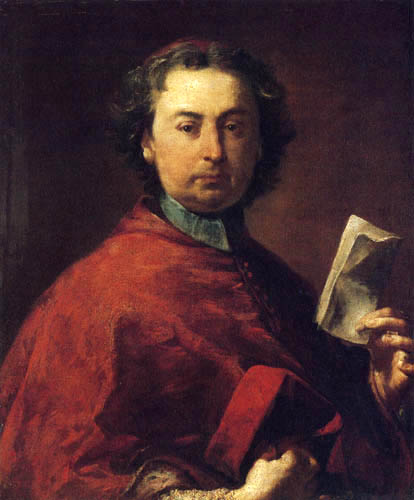
- Church: Roman Catholic
- Appointed: 29 August 1740
- Term ended: 16 February 1753
- Other post: Cardinal-Priest of San Lorenzo in Damaso

Orders
- Consecration: 13 April 1698 by Fabrizio Spada
- Created cardinal: 17 May 1706 by Pope Clement XI
- Rank: Cardinal-Bishop

Personal details
- Born: 15 September 1663 Naples, Kingdom of Naples
- Died: 16 February 1753 (aged 89) Palazzo della Cancelleria, Rome, Papal States
- Buried: San Lorenzo in Damaso
- Coat of arms: Tommaso Ruffo's coat of arms

Tommaso Ruffo (1663–1753) was an Italian Cardinal, who had been archbishop of Ferrara.

== Life ==
He was born in Naples, son of Carlo Ruffo, 3rd Duke of Bagnara. He was educated at La Sapienza University, becoming a doctor of canon and civil law. He was a papal diplomat, elected titular archbishop of Nicaea in 1698. On 13 Apr 1698, he was consecrated bishop by Fabrizio Spada, Cardinal-Priest of San Crisogono, with Michelangelo dei Conti, Titular Archbishop of Tarsus, and Francesco Acquaviva d'Aragona, Titular Archbishop of Larissa in Thessalia, serving as co-consecrators.

He was created cardinal-priest in 1706, despite having a cousin Giacomo Boncompagni in the College of Cardinals, with the title of S. Lorenzo in Panisperna. Having served as a papal legate, he became archbishop of Ferrara in 1717. He took part in the papal conclave, 1721 and the papal conclave, 1724. He became bishop of Palestrina in 1726 and participated in the papal conclave, 1730. He was bishop of Porto e Santa Rufina 1738. and participated in the papal conclave, 1740. He became Dean of the College of Cardinals and bishop of Ostia e Velletri in 1740, and died in Rome on February 16, 1753. At the time of his death, he was the oldest living cardinal.

== Episcopal succession ==
Episcopal succession of Tommaso Ruffo

While bishop, he was the principal consecrator of:

- Francesco Saverio Guicciardi, Bishop of Narni (1709);
- Giuseppe Maria Ruffo, Bishop of Lecce (1735);

and the principal co-consecrator of:

- Niccolò Caracciolo, Titular Archbishop of Thessalonica and Apostolic Nuncio to Florence (1700);
- Marco Gradenigo, Titular Bishop of Titopolis and Coadjutor Patriarch of Aquileia (1701); and
- Antonio Maria Brancaccio, Archbishop of Acerenza e Matera (1703).

Catholic Church titles
Preceded by Giovanni Giacomo Cavallerini	Titular Archbishop of Nicaea; 1698–1706	Succeeded by Ferdinando Nuzzi
Preceded by Tommaso Bonaventura della Gherardesca	Apostolic Nuncio to Florence; 1698–1700	Succeeded by Niccolò Caracciolo
Preceded by Giambattista Rubini	Cardinal-Priest of San Lorenzo in Panisperna; 1706–1709	Succeeded by Giulio Piazza
Preceded by Leandro Colloredo	Cardinal-Priest of Santa Maria in Trastevere; 1709–1726	Succeeded by Pier Marcellino Corradini
Preceded by Taddeo Luigi dal Verme	Archbishop (Personal Title) of Ferrara; 1717–1738	Succeeded by Raniero d'Elci
Preceded by Francesco Barberini (iuniore)	Cardinal-bishop of Palestrina; 1726–1738	Succeeded by Giorgio Spinola
Preceded by Pietro Ottoboni	Cardinal-bishop of Porto; 1738–1740	Succeeded by Lodovico Pico della Mirandola
Preceded by Pietro Ottoboni	Cardinal-bishop of San Lorenzo in Damaso; 1740–1753	Succeeded by Girolamo Colonna di Sciarra
Preceded by Pietro Ottoboni	Cardinal-bishop of Ostia and Dean of the College of Cardinals; 1740–1753	Succeeded by Pierluigi Carafa
Records
Preceded by Léon Potier de Gesvres	Oldest living Member of the Sacred College; 12 November 1744 - 16 February 1753	Succeeded by Rainiero d'Elci
