= Cardinal Gotti =

Cardinal Gotti may refer to:

- Girolamo Maria Gotti (1834–1916)
- Vincenzo Ludovico Gotti (1664–1742)
