= Rainiero d'Elci =

Italian Cardinal

His Eminence Rainiero d'Elci
- Cardinal-Bishop of Ostia
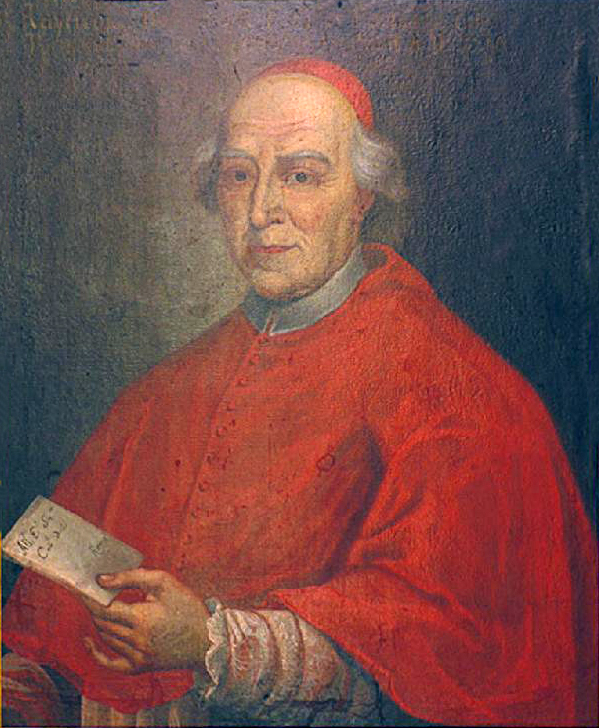
- Appointed: 12 January 1756
- Term ended: 22 June 1761
- Other posts: Dean of the College of Cardinals (1755-1761); Cardinal-priest of Santa Sabina (1738-1761)
- Previous posts: Cardinal Bishop of Porto e Santa Rufina (1753-1756); Archbishop of Ferrara (1738-1740); Apostolic Nuncio to France (1730-1738); Titular Archbishop of Rhodus (1730-1738)

Orders
- Ordination: 21 December 1699
- Consecration: 7 January 1731 by François-Maurice Gontieri
- Created cardinal: 20 December 1737 (In pectore); 23 June 1738 (revealed) by Pope Clement XII
- Rank: Cardinal-bishop

Personal details
- Born: 7 March 1670 Florence, Grand Duchy of Tuscany
- Died: 22 June 1761 (aged 91) Rome, Papal States
- Buried: Santa Sabina

Rainiero d'Elci (7 March 1670–22 June 1761) was an Italian Cardinal.

== Biography ==
He was born in Florence and was ordained in 1699. He entered papal service in the following year and held several offices both in Roman Curia and in the papal territorial administration. He was Inquisitor of Malta from 1711 until 1716.

He was consecrated titular archbishop of Rodi at the end of 1730. He served as apostolic nuncio in France 1731–1738. Pope Clement XII created him Cardinal on 20 December 1737 but did not publish it before the following June. In the same year he became archbishop of Ferrara, an office he held until 1740; he was then legate in that city.

He became bishop of Sabina (10 April 1747), then bishop of Porto e Santa Rufina (9 April 1753). He became Dean of the Sacred College of Cardinals at the death of Pietro Luigi Carafa on 15 December 1755, and as such he was transferred to the see of Ostia e Velletri (proper of the Dean) on 12 January 1756.

He presided over the Papal conclave, 1758. In spite of his advanced age, he received several votes during its celebration. He died in Rome and is buried in his titular church of Santa Sabina.

Catholic Church titles
Preceded by Mihály Frigyes Althan	Cardinal-Priest of Santa Sabina; 1738–1747	Succeeded by Leonardo Antonelli
Preceded by Vincenzo Bichi	Cardinal-Bishop of Sabina; 10 April 1747 – 9 April 1753	Succeeded by Silvio Valenti Gonzaga
Preceded by Pierluigi Carafa	Cardinal-Bishop of Porto e Santa Rufina; 9 April 1753 – 112 January 1756	Succeeded by Giovanni Antonio Guadagni
Preceded by Pierluigi Carafa	Cardinal-Bishop of Osta e Velletri and Dean of the College of Cardinals; 12 January 1756 – 22 June 1761	Succeeded by Giuseppe Spinelli
Records
Preceded by Tommaso Ruffo	Oldest living Member of the Sacred College; 16 February 1753 – 22 June 1761	Succeeded by Giacomo Oddi
