= Angel with the Crown of Thorns =

Sculpture by Gianlorenzo Bernini

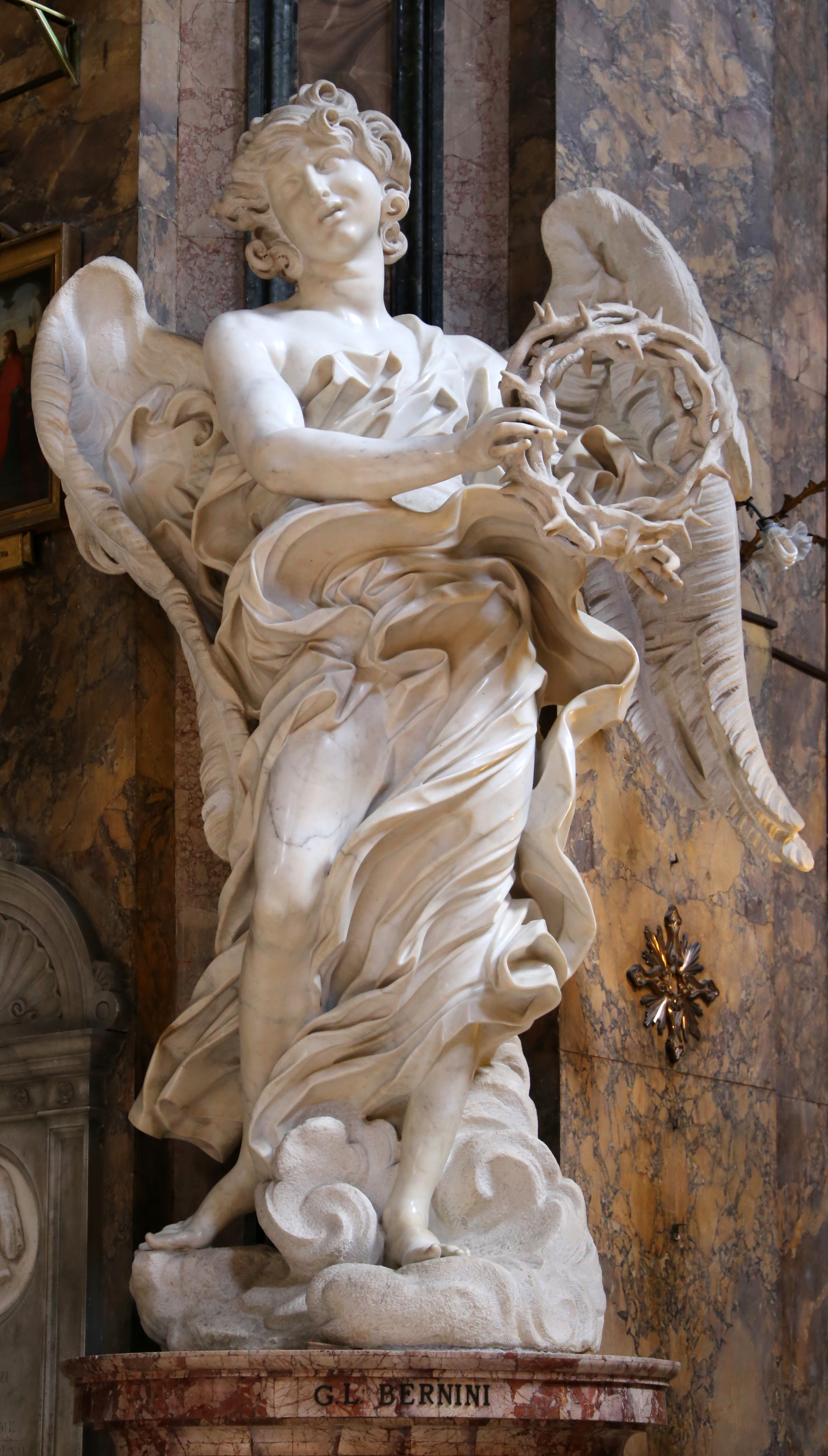
- Artist: Gian Lorenzo Bernini
- Year: 1667
- Catalogue: 72
- Type: Sculpture
- Medium: Marble
- Subject: Angel
- Location: Sant'Andrea delle Fratte; Rome; 41°54′13.0″N 12°29′0.7″E
- Preceded by: Elephant and Obelisk
- Followed by: Angel with the Superscription

Angel with the Crown of Thorns is a statue by Italian artist Gian Lorenzo Bernini. Originally commissioned by Pope Clement IX for the Ponte Sant'Angelo project, the statue was replaced with a copy and the original was moved to Sant'Andrea delle Fratte in Rome, Italy. The statue was started in 1667 and completed in 1669. A terracotta modello for the sculpture is held by the musée du Louvre in Paris.

The statue depicts the crown of thorns mentioned in the canonical gospels.

== See also ==
- List of works by Gian Lorenzo Bernini
