= Angel with the Superscription =

Sculpture by Gian Lorenzo Bernini

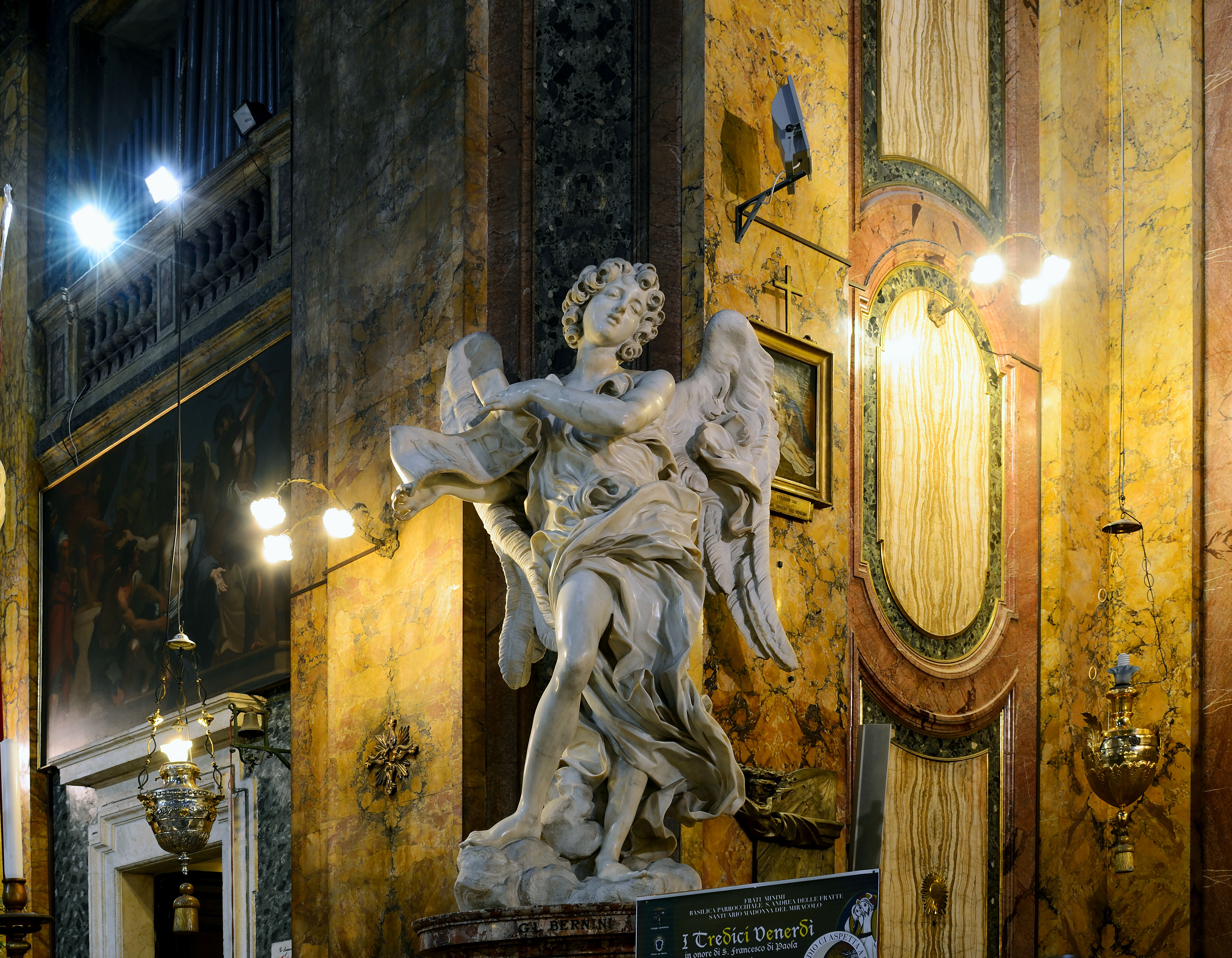
- Artist: Gian Lorenzo Bernini
- Year: 1667
- Catalogue: 72
- Type: Sculpture
- Medium: Marble
- Subject: Angel
- Location: Sant'Andrea delle Fratte; Rome; 41°54′13.0″N 12°29′0.7″E
- Preceded by: Angel with the Crown of Thorns
- Followed by: The Vision of Constantine (Bernini)

Angel with the Superscription is a statue by Italian artist Gian Lorenzo Bernini. Originally commissioned by Pope Clement IX for the Ponte Sant'Angelo project, the statue was replaced with a copy and the original was moved to Sant'Andrea delle Fratte in Rome, Italy. The statue was started in 1667 and completed in 1669.

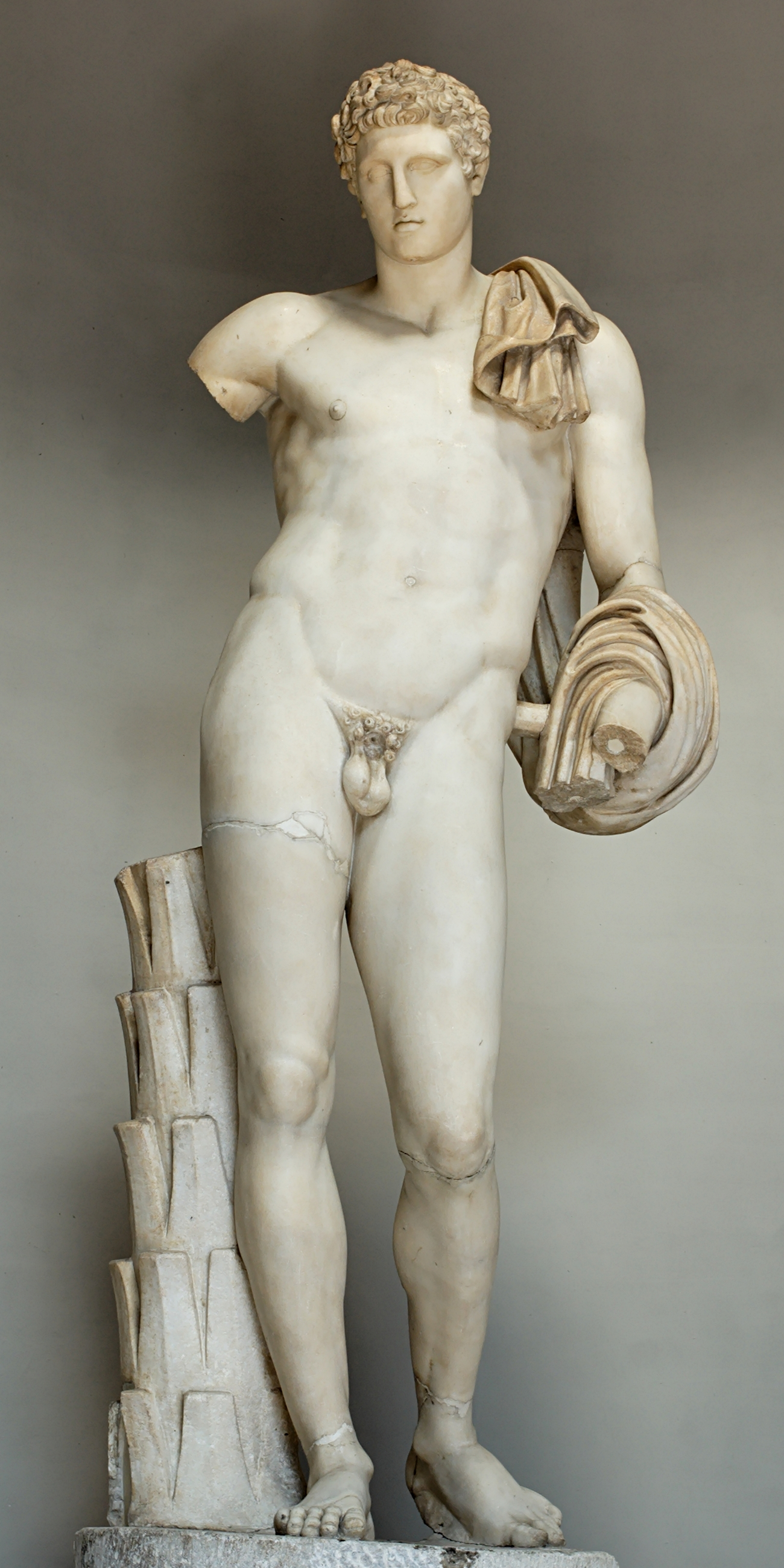
So-called “Belvedere Antinous”

It might seem that in this late work Bernini is not inspired by ancient works, instead the body (not the drapery) derives from Belvedere Antinoo (now Ermes): a figure studied by many other artists such as Algardi, Duquesnoy and Poussin. Bernini will say the students of the Academy of France in Paris that he was inspired many times by this statue, from his youth, considering it an "oracle".

== See also ==
- List of works by Gian Lorenzo Bernini
