= Giovanni Battista Lenardi =

Italian painter

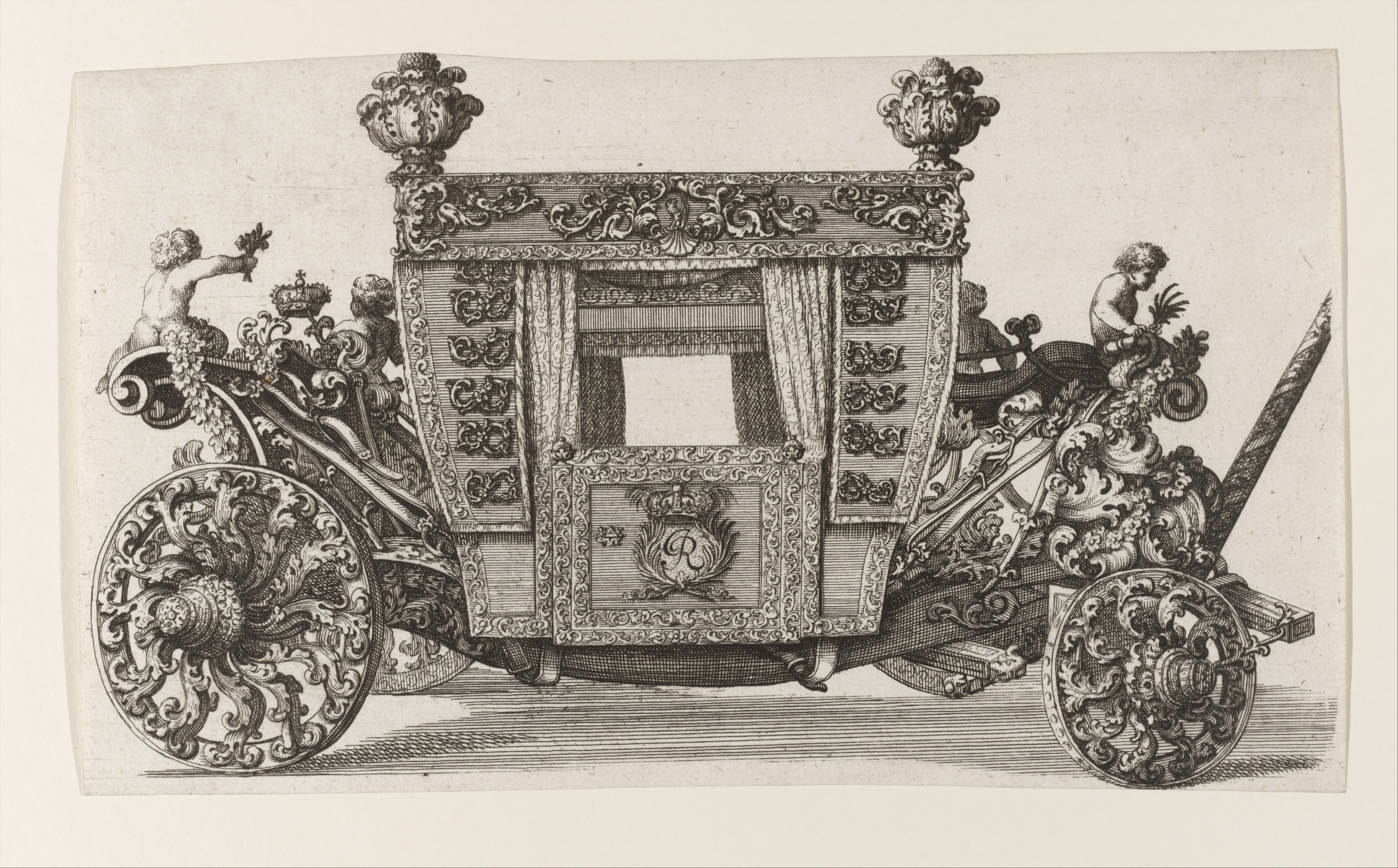
Giovanni Battista Lenardi. Side view of the Second Carriage of Lord Castelmaine built in 1686 by Andrea Cornely.

Giovanni Battista Lenardi (active circa 1660, died after 1703) was an Italian painter of the Baroque period, active mainly in Rome.

Lenardi was born in Ascoli Piceno, and trained in Rome with Pietro da Cortona and then Lazzaro Baldi. He painted for the church of Sant'Andrea delle Fratte and the Buonfratelli in Trastevere.
