= Sant'Andrea delle Fratte =

Roman Catholic basilica, a landmark of Rome, Italy

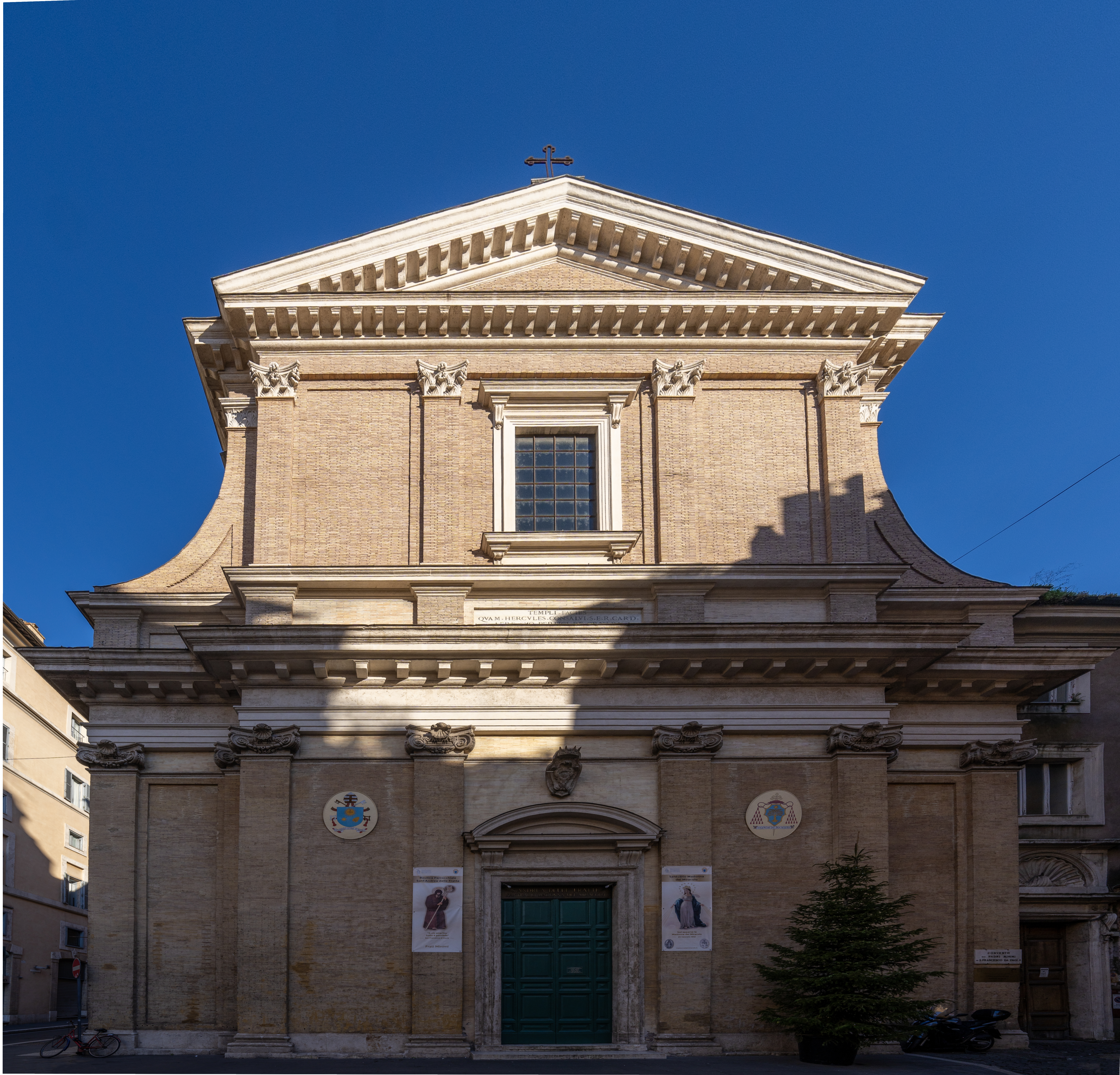
- Façade of the church from the Piazza
- Click on the map for a fullscreen view
- 41°54′13″N 12°29′01″E
- Location: 1 Via di Sant'Andrea delle Fratte, Rome
- Country: Italy
- Denomination: Catholic
- Tradition: Latin Church
- Religious order: Order of Minims
- Website: santandreadellefratte.it

History
- Status: Titular church
- Dedication: Andrew the Apostle

Architecture
- Architect(s): Francesco Borromini; Mattia de Rossi
- Architectural type: Church
- Style: Baroque
- Groundbreaking: 1604
- Completed: 1826

Sant'Andrea delle Fratte ("Saint Andrew of the Thickets") is a 17th-century basilica church in Rome, Italy, dedicated to St. Andrew. The Cardinal Priest of the Titulus S. Andreae Apostoli de Hortis is Ennio Antonelli.

== History ==
The current church was built over a pre-existing one, erected in 1192, called infra hortes ("amidst the orchards", whence the name fratte, "thickets", from Byzantine Greek φράκτη, phráktē, "hedge") for it was located in a countryside area on the northern edge of the inhabited area of medieval Rome. The church originally belonged to Augustinian nuns. It became the national church of the Scottish people in Rome, until Scotland became Protestant, when in 1585 Pope Sixtus V assigned it to the Minim friars of Saint Francis of Paola. The Scots College, the seminary for young men studying for the priesthood, was located nearby, on the Via del Tritone, until 1604, when it moved to the Via delle Quattro Fontane.

In 1942 Pope Pius XII elevated the church to the rank of a minor basilica.

== Fabric of the Church ==
In 1604 the construction of the new church was begun, to the design of Gaspare Guerra. The project, halted eight years later, was revamped in 1653 by Francesco Borromini, who is responsible for the apse, the tholobate of the cupola, and the square campanile with four orders. After his death, the construction was continued by Mattia De Rossi. The late Renaissance-style façade, with two orders divided by pilasters, was completed in 1826, thanks to funds provided the Testament of Cardinal Ercole Consalvi.

== Interior ==
The interior has a single nave with three chapels on each side, and two small chapels on either side of the entrance. The decoration of the cupola is by Pasquale Marini. Along the nave in the first chapel is a wooden tempietto (temple) (1674) painted by Borgognone and on the wall is a "Baptism of Christ" of Ludovico Gimignani. In the chapel of Saint Francis de Sales is the funeral monument of Cardinal Pierluigi Carafa sculpted by Pietro Bracci. In the cloister, the lunettes are frescoed with stories from the Life of Saint Francesco by Marini, Francesco Cozza, and Filippo Gherardi. In the transept, the altar (1736) was designed by Filippo Barigioni, the altarpiece of Saint Francis of Paola was painted by Paris Nogari, the stuccoed angels were added by Giovanni Battista Maini. The presbytery dome has a fresco of the Multiplication of the loaves and fishes by Marini. Behind the altar, is a Crucifixion of Sant'Andrea by Giovanni Battista Lenardi, the Entombment of Sant'Andrea by Francesco Trevisani, and a Death of Saint Andrew by Lazzaro Baldi.

The chapel in the left transept is dedicated to Saint Anne and was designed by Luigi Vanvitelli and Giuseppe Valadier with an altarpiece of Saints Anne, Young John the Baptist, and Mary by Giuseppe Bottani.

In the third chapel on the left, by Domenico Bartolini, is dedicated to the Madonna of the Miracle to commemorate the place where, on 20 January 1842, the Blessed Virgin Mary reportedly appeared to a young Jewish man, Maria Alphonse Ratisbonne, leading him to convert to Catholicism. He later founded the Congregation of Notre-Dame de Sion (Our Lady of Sion), a group of Catholic priests, lay brothers and Religious Sisters dedicated to work for the conversion of Jews to Catholicism. In honor of this apparition, the pews of the church are oriented to this altar. In 1950 the chapel was completely renovated by the architect Marcello Piacentini and enriched with precious marble.

=== Maximillian Kolbe ===
In this same Bartolini Chapel, Maximilian Kolbe celebrated his first Mass as a Priest in 1918. As Ratisbonne worked to convert Jews, Maximilian founded the order Militia Immaculatae to convert sinners and enemies of the Church. Maximilian was devoted to the cult of the Virgin Mary and went on to found the periodical "Knights of the Immaculata" and undertook many missions to Asia before he was martyred by the Nazis at Auschwitz.

=== Bernini's angels ===
At the sides of the presbytery are two angels (1667–1699) by Bernini, the Angel with the Crown of Thorns and the Angel with the Superscription. They were originally intended for the Ponte Sant'Angelo, but Pope Clement IX considered them too valuable to be exposed to the elements and they were later moved here and replaced on the bridge with copies.

== Cardinal Protectors ==
This Basilica is the seat of the cardinalatial title of Sancti Andreæ Apostoli de Hortis.

- Paolo Marella (31 March 1960 – 15 March 1972)
- Joseph Cordeiro (5 March 1973 – 11 February 1994)
- Thomas Joseph Winning (26 November 1994 – 17 June 2001)
- Ennio Antonelli (21 October 2003 – present)

== Burials ==
- Petar Parchevich, Archbishop of Marcianopolis in Bulgaria (d. 1674)
- Cardinal Carolo Leopoldo Calcagnini (1679–1746)
- Cardinal Pierluigi Carafa (1677–1755)
- Cardinal Ludovico Valenti (1695–1763)
- Felice Giani
- Angelika Kauffmann, Swiss painter (d. 1807)
- Orest Kiprensky, the Russian painter (d. 1836)

== Gallery ==
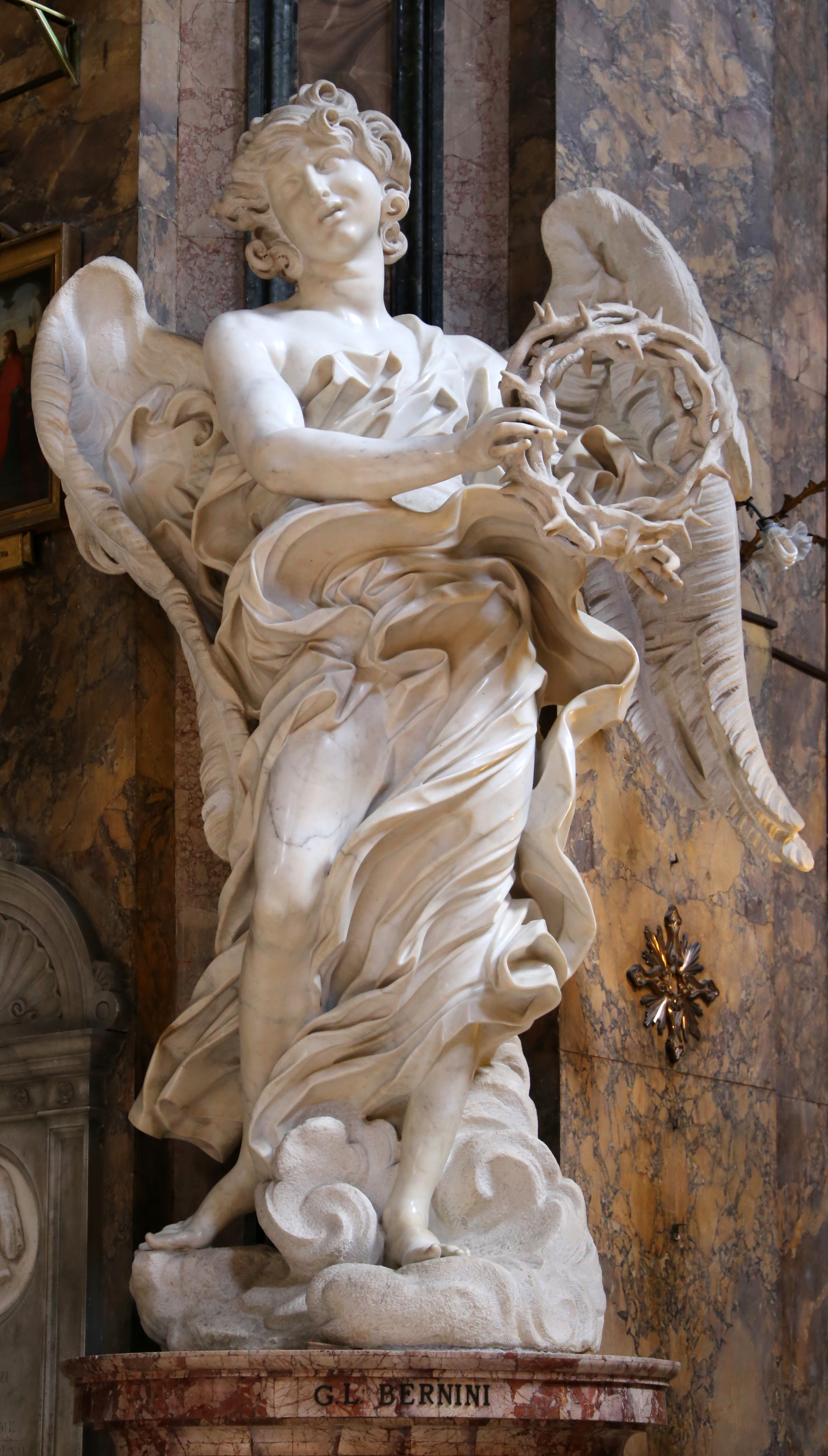
Angel with the Crown of Thorns by Bernini

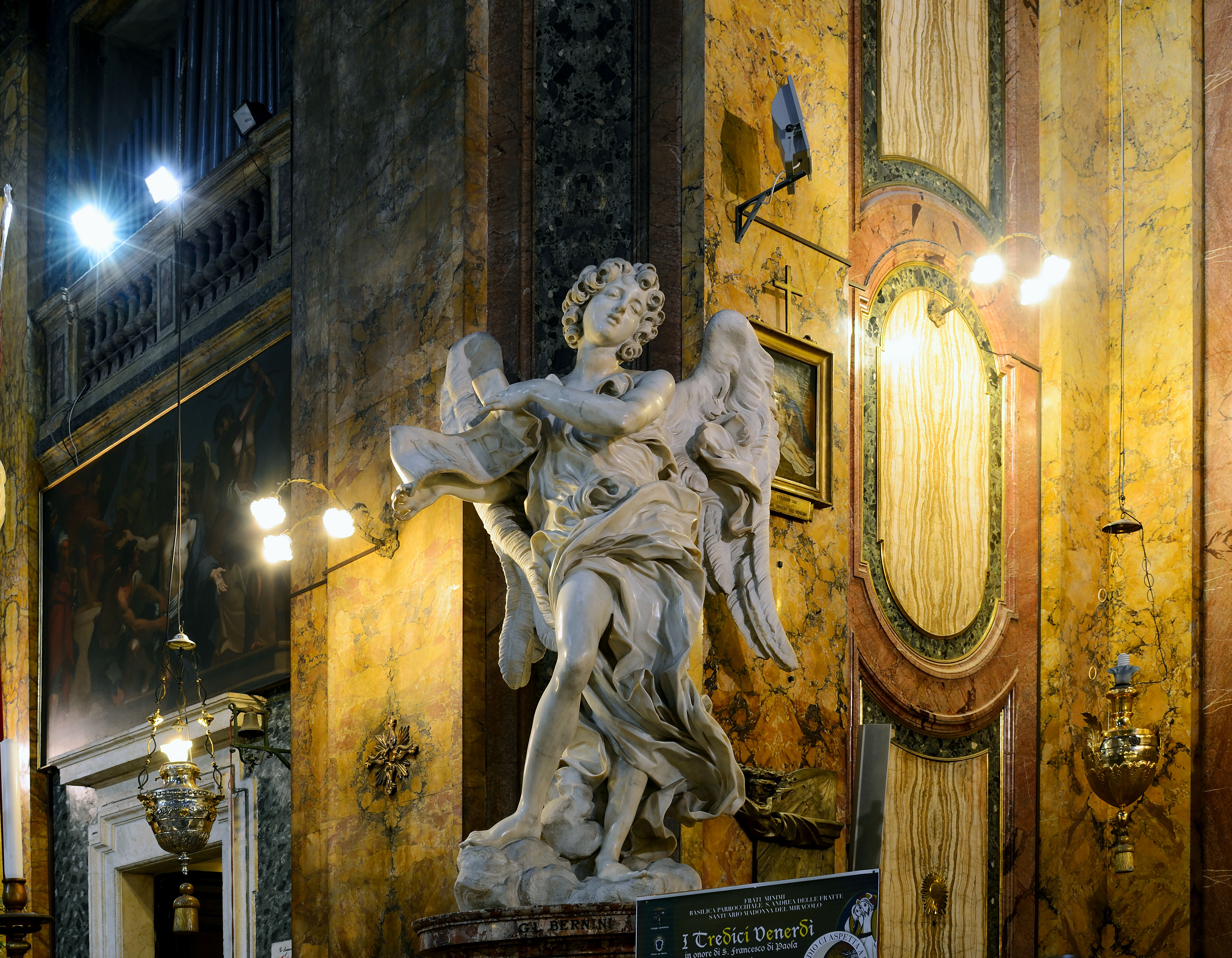
Angel with the Superscription by Bernini

== Books ==
- Forcella, Vincenzo (1876). Iscrizioni delle chiese e d'altri edificii di Roma dal secolo XI fino ai giorni nostri. Vol. VIII. Roma: Tip. delle scienze matematiche e fisiche. pp. 213–254.
- Nibby, Antonio (1839). Roma nell'anno MDCCCXXXVIII: pte. I-II. Antica. Roma: Tipografia delle belle arti. pp. 77–80.
- Salvagnini, Francesco Alberto (1967). La Basilica di S. Andrea delle Fratte: santuario della Madonna del Miracolo. Roma: Basilica S. Andrea delle Fratte.

Preceded by Sant'Anastasia al Palatino	Landmarks of Rome; Sant'Andrea delle Fratte	Succeeded by Sant'Andrea della Valle
