= Lodovico Pico della Mirandola =

Italian cardinal (1668–1747)

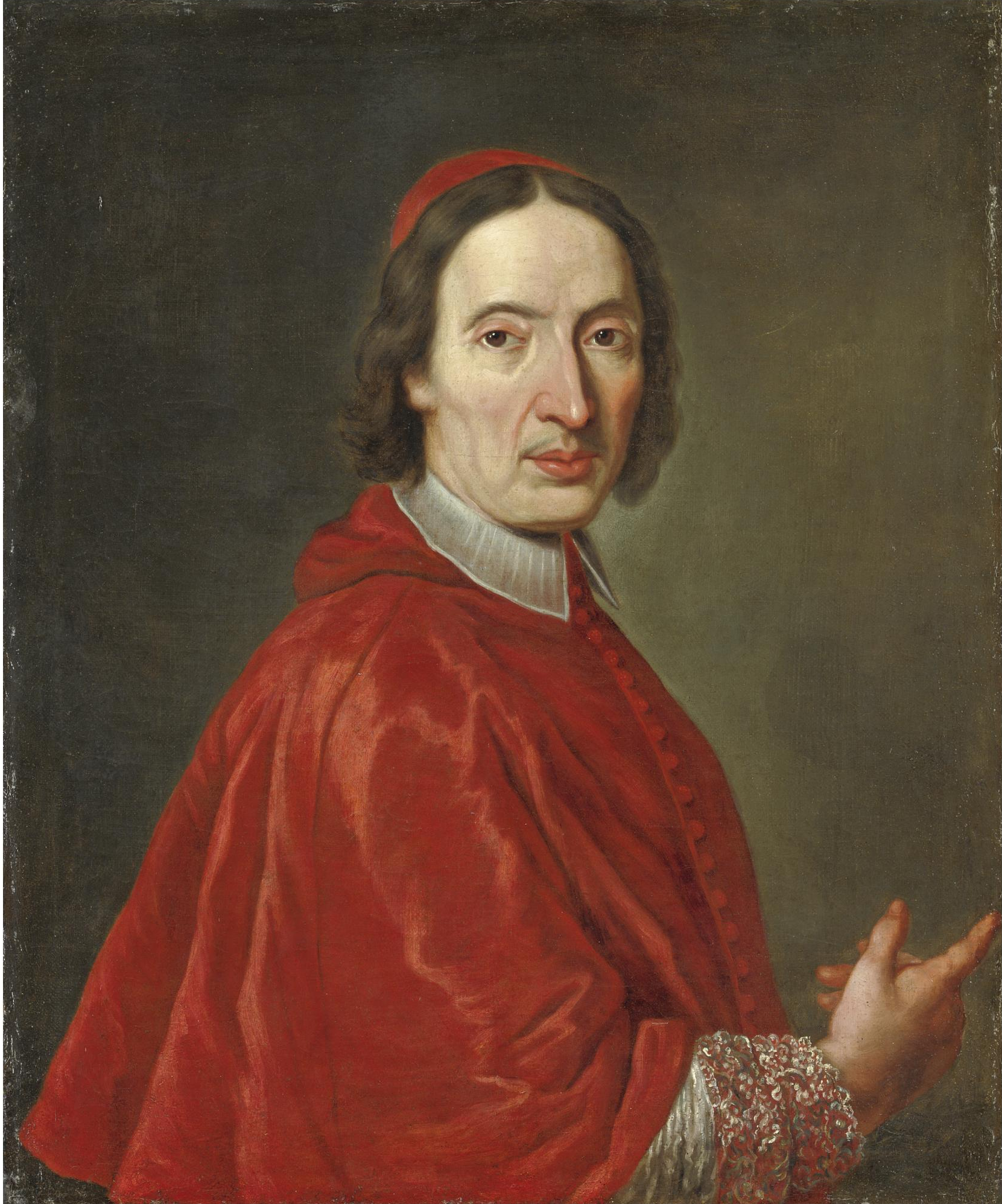
Painting of Lodovico Pico della Mirandola (1703).

Lodovico Pico della Mirandola (Mirandola, 9 December 1668 – Rome, 10 August 1743) was an Italian cardinal.

== Biography ==
Lodovico was the eighth of the nine children of Alessandro II Pico della Mirandola, II Duke of Mirandola, Marquis of Concordia and general in the French army, and of Anna Beatrice d'Este, daughter of Alfonso III d'Este. He was also related to Cardinal Antonio Maria Salviati.

Having obtained a doctorate in utroque iure, he obtained the clerical distinctions on 1 November 1683.

After the French attacked his hometown, he fled to Bologna, then to Rome and finally to Vienna where he was received by the Emperor who welcomed him into his forced exile. Returning to Rome, he was appointed domestic prelate of His Holiness and cleric of the Apostolic chamber from 21 May 1699. Named Prefect of the Chamber of His Holiness from 7 June 1706, he received the subdiaconate shortly thereafter.

Elected Titular patriarch of Constantinople from 25 June 1706, he had to obtain a dispensation for having only received the subdiaconate without having yet taken his Holy orders. Consecrated bishop, he became assistant to the papal throne from 28 June 1706 and then Prefect of the Apostolic Palace from 24 October 1707. He was appointed Governor of Castel Gandolfo in that same year 1707 for a three-year term.

Created Cardinal in pectore in the consistory of 18 May 1712, his name was published in the consistory of 26 September of that year, receiving the cardinal's hat and the title of San Silvestro in Capite on 21 November. Camerlengo of the Sacred College of Cardinals from 4 January 1717, he was transferred to the Episcopal see of Senigallia with the title of Archbishop from 22 November of that year.

Prefect of the Congregation for Indulgences and Sacred Relics, he participated in the Conclave of 1721 that elected Pope Innocent XIII and again in that of 1724 that elected Pope Benedict XIII. After renouncing the government of his Archdiocese on 10 September 1724, he returned to Rome and was appointed archpriest of the Basilica of Santa Maria Maggiore in July 1730. He then opted for the Cardinal title of Santa Prassede from 24 April 1728 and then took part in the conclave of 1730 that elected Pope Clement XII, renouncing the office of Archpriest shortly thereafter.

Opting therefore for the order of bishops, he was assigned to the Suburbicarian seat of Albano from 9 April 1731 and with this title he participated in the conclave of 1740 that elected Pope Benedict XIV. He then chose the title of Porto-Santa Rufina on 29 August 1740 and was appointed Vice-dean of the Sacred College of Cardinals.

He died on 10 August 1743 in his palace in Rome near the Basilica of the Holy XII Apostles. He was buried in the new church of the archconfraternity of the Santissimo Nome di Maria al Foro Traiano in Rome, of which he had been a copious benefactor, according to his will.

== Sources ==
- Paolo Appignanesi, Ludovico Pico della Mirandola, Giacomo Ascari e Cingoli in: Biblioteca Cingoli
- Stefano Tabacchi, PICO, Ludovico, in Dizionario biografico degli italiani, vol. 83, Istituto dell'Enciclopedia Italiana, 2015.
- Pico della Mirandola, in Accademia della Crusca.
- Lodovico Pico della Mirandola, in BeWeb, Conferenza Episcopale Italiana.
- David M. Cheney, Lodovico Pico della Mirandola, in Catholic Hierarchy.
