= 1724 conclave =

Election of Catholic Pope Benedict XIII

Papal conclave March–May 1724

Dates and location
- 20 March – 28 May 1724; Apostolic Palace, Papal States

Key officials
- Dean: Sebastiano Tanara
- Sub-dean: Pierfrancesco Orsini
- Camerlengo: Annibale Albani
- Protopriest: Galeazzo Marescotti
- Protodeacon: Benedetto Pamphili

Elected pope
- Pierfrancesco Orsini; Name taken: Benedict XIII
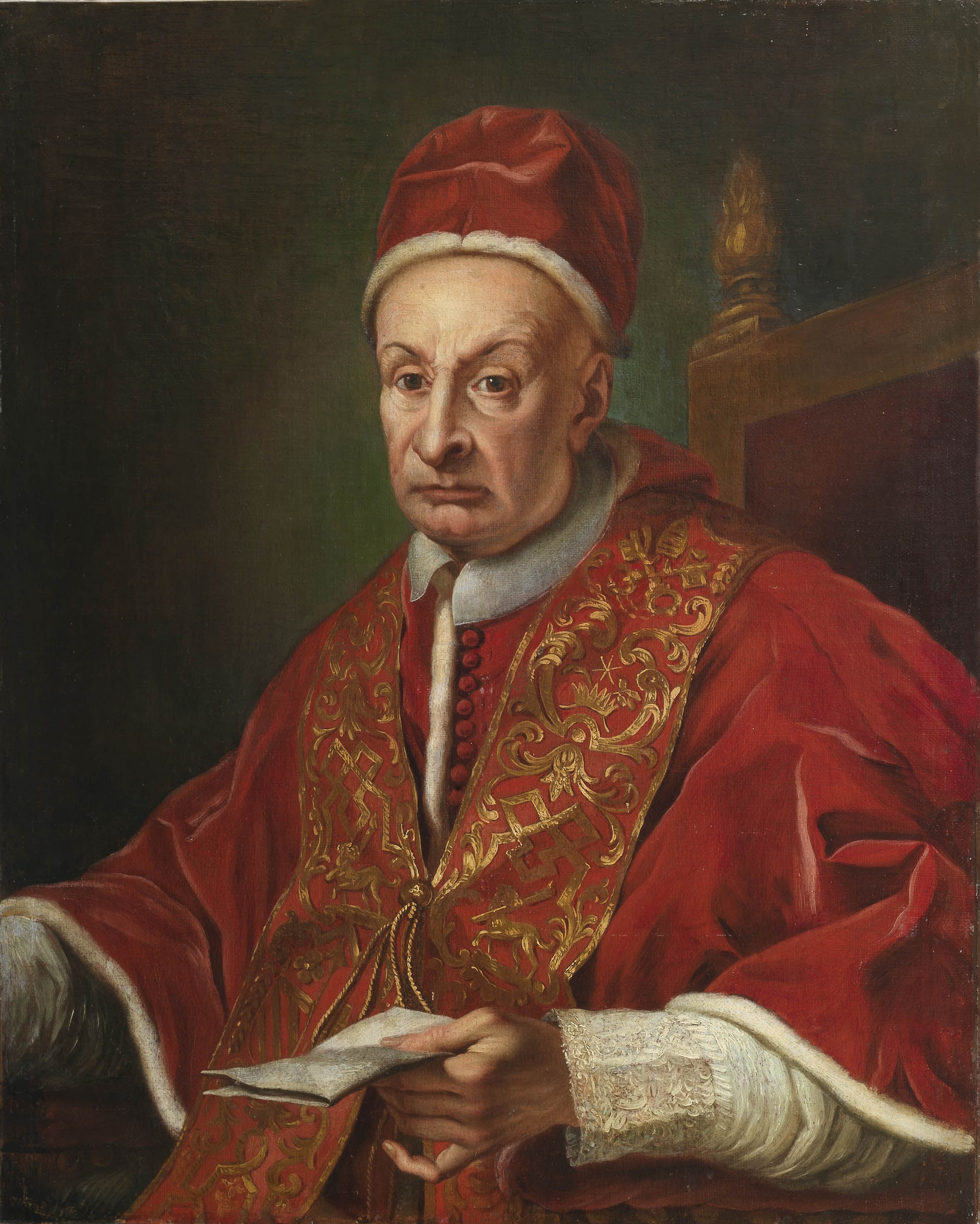

The 1724 papal conclave was called upon the death of Pope Innocent XIII. It began on 20 March 1724 and ended on 28 May that year with the election of Cardinal Pierfrancesco Orsini, a Dominican friar, as Pope Benedict XIII. This papal conclave was made of largely the same electors that had elected Pope Innocent XIII in 1721, and the same factions dominated it. Multiple attempts were made to elect a candidate acceptable to the various Catholic monarchies at the time, but none of which were successful until May. Benedict XIII resisted his election for two days, before he was convinced to accept it.

== Background ==
The papal conclave that had elected Innocent XIII in 1721 was dominated by cardinals appointed by Clement XI, who had been pope for 21 years and appointed over 70 cardinals during that time. The conclave that elected Innocent was marked by a new alliance between the French and Spanish cardinals due to a change in the Spanish dynasty following the War of the Spanish Succession that resulted in Philip V, a Bourbon and the grandson of Louis XIV of France, ascending to what had previously been a Habsburg throne. Innocent was elected unanimously with the prospect that he might cooperate with both Bourbon France and the Habsburg Holy Roman Emperor. Innocent had been in poor health for the year before his death on 7 March 1724 and preparations for the conclave to elect his successor had begun before his death.

== Conclave ==
During his pontificate, Innocent XIII only created three new cardinals. When he died, the composition of the College of Cardinals and its factions were similar to that of the one who had elected him. The conclave began on 20 March 1724 with only 33 cardinal electors present, but eventually, 53 total cardinals took part in the election.

At the start of the conclave, electors from the zelanti faction attempted to elect Giuseppe Renato Imperiali, but this was not possible because of his unpopularity with both France and Spain. Following this attempt, cardinals representing the Bourbons insisted that no serious effort to elect a new pope take place until all cardinals who were traveling had arrived and until the electors had received instructions from the various Catholic monarchs.

Annibale Albani, the brother of Clement XI, tried to elect Fabrizio Paolucci as pope, having supported him previously in 1721. The Habsburg emperor, Charles VI, was opposed to Paolucci because he was sympathetic to the Bourbons, and a papal veto from Charles arrived from Vienna before Paolucci could be elected. Several electors continued to vote for Paolucci after he was excluded in protest of the veto. Representatives of England attempted to influence the conclave to reduce the honours that had been given in Rome to members of the House of Stuart, but their influence was limited because Giulio Alberoni, who had agreed to help them, did not have significant influence at the conclave.

Charles VI had instructed his representative to the papal court Maximilian Ulrich von Kaunitz to work closely with Álvaro Cienfuegos to elect a candidate he favoured. Cienfuego's instructions were that cardinals Pamfili, Vallemani, Spada, Piazza, Corradini, Caracciolo, Tanara, Orsini, Ruffo, Colonna, Davia, Boncompagni, Pico, and Pignatelli would be acceptable to the emperor and that cardinals Paolucci, Olivieri, Bussi, Sagripanti, and Origo were to be excluded.

Cienfuegos led electors that were part of the imperial party in an attempt to elect Giulio Piazza. Piazza was almost elected on 13 May, but was short by four votes. The electors were confident they could elect him because more cardinals were arriving to participate in the conclave, and it became public in Rome that Piazza was likely to be the new pope. Albani did not support this because he had not been a part of the negotiations despite being the original elector to suggest Piazza, and undermined his election by proposing Pierfrancesco Orsini as an alternate candidate.

== Election of Benedict XIII ==
On 28 May, the conclave unanimously elected Orsini as Pope. He had not been seen as a serious candidate in past conclaves because he did not have political experience. Orsini was 75 then, and it took the cardinals two days to convince him to accept his election. He was recorded to have spent the night before his election sleepless and in tears. Even when the cardinals had taken him into the Sistine Chapel for the formal vote to elect him pope after they had been convinced he would accept, he was still unwilling to accept his election. Ultimately, he only accepted it after being convinced of it by Agustín Pipia the Master of the Dominican Order, of which he was a member. Upon accepting his election, he attempted to take the name Benedict XIV, which would have recognized Antipope Benedict XIII, the last Avignon Pope during the Western Schism. Lawyers from the Roman Curia eventually persuaded Orisini to take the name Benedict XIII.

Orsini's election was notable at the time because it was unusual for the cardinals to elect friars since some saw them as too rigid. Members of religious orders at the time were often respected by the cardinals but rarely elected, with Benedict XIII being only the fourth since the Council of Trent. Unlike the other mendicants elected to the papacy in this period, he was of noble birth, being the eldest son of the Duke of Gravina, but had forfeited his rights to his father's title to enter the Dominicans.
