= Pompeo Aldrovandi =

Italian cardinal (1668–1752)

His Eminence Pompeo Aldrovandi
- Cardinal, Archbishop of Corneto e Montefiascone
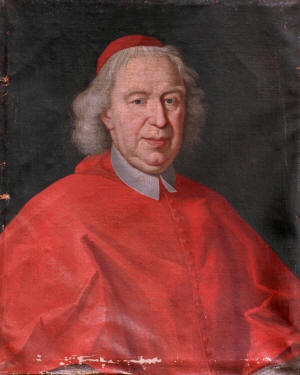
- Pompeo Aldrovandi
- Diocese: Corneto e Montefiascone
- In office: 1734–1752
- Other posts: Cardinal-Priest of Sant'Eusebio (1734–52); Vice-Chamberlain of the Holy Roman Church; Titular Patriarch of Jerusalem (1729–34)

Orders
- Ordination: 5 October 1710
- Consecration: 11 October 1716 by Fabrizio Paolucci
- Created cardinal: 24 March 1734 by Pope Clement XII

Personal details
- Born: 23 September 1668 Bologna, Papal States
- Died: 6 January 1752 (aged 83) Montefiascone, Papal States

Pompeo Aldrovandi (23 September 1668 – 6 January 1752) was an Italian cardinal of the Roman Catholic Church.

== Biography ==
Aldrovandi was born on 23 September 1668 in Bologna, then part of the Papal States, and studied law at the local university, being awarded a doctorate in canon and civil law in 1691. He entered the Roman Curia five years later and then steadily climbed the career ladder in the administration and was ordained priest in 1710, served as a chargé d'affaires in the nunciature in Spain from 1712 to 1716.

On 5 October 1716, he became titular archbishop of Neocaesarea and was appointed Nuncio in Spain in 1717. However, the political troubles between the Holy See and the King of Spain led to his being recalled to Bologna, where he stayed until the death of Pope Clement XI. On 23 March 1729, he was made titular Patriarch of Jerusalem and was made Governor of Rome and later in 1733, he was appointed Vice-chamberlain of the Apostolic Camera.

Aldrovandi was created Cardinal priest in the consistory of 24 March 1734 with the title of Sant'Eusebio. In 1734, he was appointed archbishop with personal title to the diocese of Montefiascone. He participated in the conclave of 1740, where the elections were stalled for forty days because many cardinals kept voting for him, despite their being unable to elect him, as they could not secure the required two-thirds majority. In the conclave Cardinal Lambertini, who was later elected Pope Benedict XIV, said to the College of Cardinals: "If you wish to elect a saint, choose Gotti; a statesman, Aldrovandi; an honest man, me." Vincenzo Ludovico Gotti (1664–1742) was professor of philosophy at the College of Saint Thomas, the future Pontifical University of Saint Thomas Aquinas, Angelicum. Gotti was perhaps the leading Thomist of his time.

Aldrovandi served as Datary of His Holiness from 1740 to 1743. He died in 1752 at Montefiascone.
