= Giovanni Antonio Guadagni =

Italian Discalced Carmelite and cardinal

Servant of God Giovanni Antonio Guadagni OCD
- Vicar General of Rome
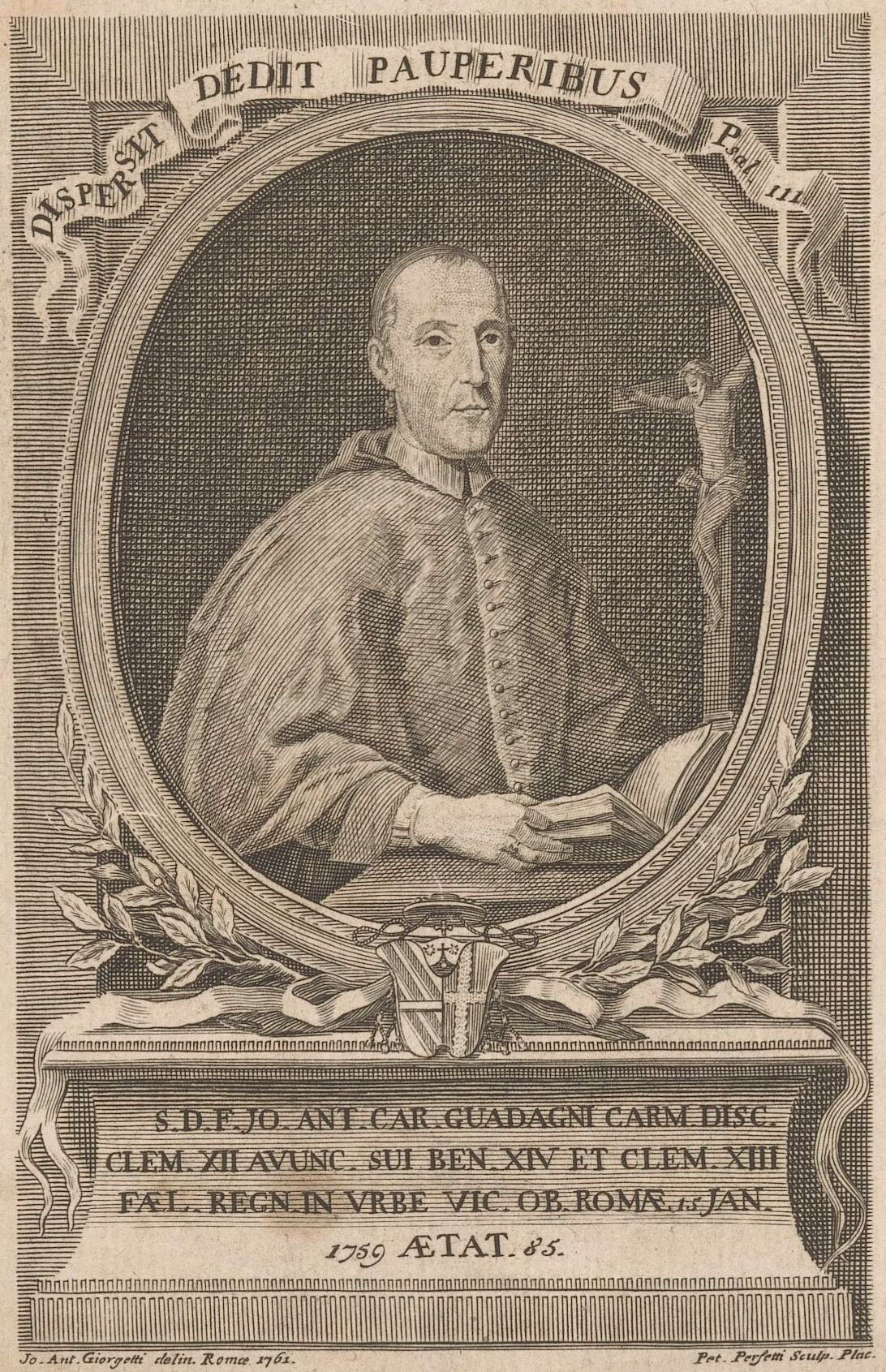
- Church: Catholic Church
- Appointed: 1 March 1732
- Term ended: 15 January 1759
- Predecessor: Prospero Marefoschi
- Successor: Antonio Maria Erba-Odescalchi
- Other posts: Camerlengo of the College of Cardinals (1743-59); Cardinal-Bishop of Porto e Santa Rufina (1756-59); Vice-Dean of the College of Cardinals (1756-59)
- Previous posts: Bishop of Arezzo (1724-32); Cardinal-Deacon of Santi Silvestro e Martino ai Monti (1731-50); Cardinal-Bishop of Frascati (1750-56)

Orders
- Ordination: 11 March 1702
- Consecration: 31 December 1724 by Lorenzo Corsini
- Created cardinal: 24 September 1731 by Pope Clement XII
- Rank: Cardinal-Priest (1731-50); Cardinal-Bishop (1750-59)

Personal details
- Born: Giovanni Antonio Guadagni; 14 September 1674 Florence, Grand Duchy of Tuscany
- Died: 15 January 1759 (aged 84) Rome, Papal States
- Buried: Santa Maria della Scala
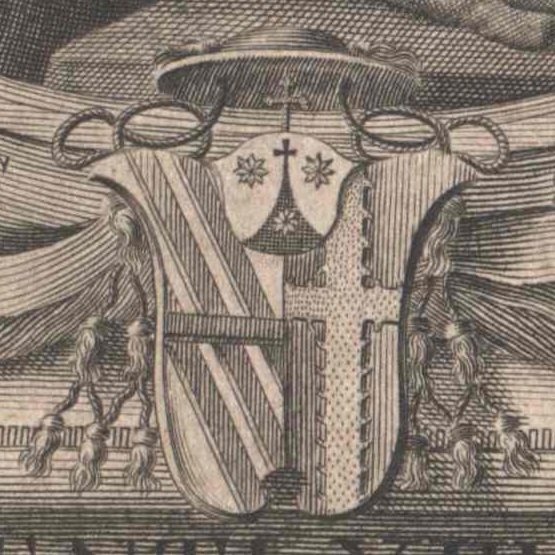
- Coat of arms: Giovanni Antonio Guadagni's coat of arms

Ordination history of Giovanni Antonio Guadagni
History
Episcopal consecration
- Principal consecrator: Lorenzo Corsini
- Co-consecrators: Pier Luigi Carafa; Filippo Carlo Spada
Cardinalate
- Elevated by: Pope Clement XII
Episcopal succession
Bishops consecrated by Giovanni Antonio Guadagni as principal consecrator
- Severino Antonio Missini: 22 June 1732
- Federico Alamanni: 25 July 1732
- Carlo Ronchi: 21 December 1732
- Francesco Guidi: 25 January 1733
- Sigismondo Tudisi: 6 September 1733
- João da Madre de Deus Seixas da Fonseca Borges, O.S.B.: 4 October 1733
- Giacomo Beni: 22 November 1733
- Serafino Cenci: 26 December 1733
- Giacomo Lanfredini: 4 April 1734
- Gaetano Calvani: 11 April 1734
- Carlo Filippo Incontri: 16 May 1734
- Dominico Laymo: 11 July 1734
- Vincent Cossovich: 8 December 1734
- Giuseppe Suares de la Concha: 30 January 1735
- Vincenzo Maria Diedo: 11 April 1735
- Alberico Simonetta: 9 October 1735
- Francesco De Novellis: 4 December 1735
- Gaetano d'Arco: 4 December 1735
- Francesco Maria Ginori: 4 March 1736
- Claudio Domenico Albini: 19 March 1736
- Balthasar Maria Remondini: 19 March 1736
- Luca Melchiore Tempi: 15 April 1736
- Andreas Vinditti: 12 May 1737
- Francesco Lanfreschi: 30 June 1737
- Francesco Gaetano Incontri: 11 May 1738
- Melchiorre Delfico: 11 May 1738
- Giovanni Andrea Schiano: 27 July 1738
- Ludovicus Benzoni, O.Carm.: 27 July 1738
- Francesco Antonio Salomone: 14 September 1738
- Gaetano Fraccagnani: 12 October 1738
- Giovanni Ferro: 28 December 1738
- Pietro Antonio Zuccheri: 1 February 1739
- Ferdinando Maria de' Rossi: 2 August 1739
- Ignazio Michele Crivelli: 4 October 1739
- Ludovico Ancaiani: 30 November 1739
- Antonio Vegni: 30 November 1739
- Bartolomeo Mollo: 8 December 1739
- Francesco Vivani: 13 November 1740
- Francesco Maria Piccolomini: 9 July 1741
- Francesco Antonio Spadea: 28 January 1742
- Giovanni Andrea Tria II: 28 January 1742
- Pietro Antonio Raimondi: 28 January 1742
- Donato Maria Arcangeli: 11 March 1742
- Angelo Maria Marculli, O.S.A.: 27 May 1742
- Mattaeus Caraman: 15 July 1742
- Marino Bozzatini: 15 July 1742
- Biagio Chiarelli: 9 December 1742
- Isidoro Pitellia, O.M.: 25 July 1743
- Bernardino Antonio Diego Bernardi, O.M.: 22 December 1743
- Filippo Felice del Prete: 26 April 1744
- Vito Moio: 21 June 1744
- Silvestro Lodovico Paparelli: 13 September 1744
- Diego Andrea Tomacelli: 13 September 1744
- Felice Leone, O.E.S.A.: 25 July 1745
- Giuseppe de Vignoli: 19 June 1746
- Bernardo Bernardi, O.F.M. Conv.: 4 December 1746
- Nicolaus (Arcangelo) Bianchini, O.C.D.: 4 December 1746
- Francesco Antonio Scoppa: 23 May 1747
- Nicola Brescia: 23 May 1747
- Giovanni Bufalini: 21 December 1747
- Cosimo Pierbenedetto Maculani, C.O.: 12 May 1748
- Giuseppe Du Mesnil: 19 May 1748
- Giustino Girolamo Bagnesi, O.S.B.: 21 July 1748
- Nicola Cimaglia, O.S.B.: 21 December 1748
- Benedetto Gaetani: 27 April 1749
- Domenico Poltri: 27 April 1749
- Federigo Muschi: 1 May 1749
- Panfilo Antonio Mazzara: 1 May 1749
- Giuseppe Agostino Delbecchi, Sch.P.: 23 May 1751
- Francesco Antonio Rocco: 23 May 1751
- Segherio Felice Seghieri: 25 July 1751
- Christoph Bartholomäus Anton Migazzi Von Waal Und Sonnenthurn: 10 October 1751
- Giovanni Carlo Antonelli: 4 June 1752
- Nicolò Lercari: 26 December 1753
- Angelo Maria Venizza: 22 December 1754
- Jacopo Gaetano Nicolò Inghirami: 31 May 1755
- Domenico Gaetano Novellucci: 25 July 1755
- Filippo Niccolò Cecina: 21 December 1755
- Carlo Maria Sacripante: 25 January 1756
- Carlo Augusto Peruzzini, B.: 3 October 1756
- Pietro Maria Franzesi: 16 January 1757
- Adeodato Andrea Bivignano: 16 January 1757
- François Mattei: 3 April 1757
- Bartolomeo Felice Guelfi Camaiani: 26 November 1758

Styles of Giovanni Antonio Guadagni
- Reference style: His Eminence
- Spoken style: Your Eminence
- Informal style: Cardinal
- See: Porto e Santa Rufina

Giovanni Antonio Guadagni, OCD (14 September 1674 – 15 January 1759), religious name Giovanni Antonio di San Bernardo, was an Italian Discalced Carmelite prelate. His rise in the ranks became rapid after his maternal uncle became Pope Clement XII. He was soon after made a cardinal and served in various positions within the Roman Curia.

His beatification cause opened soon after his death but remained stalled until its resumption in 1940.

== Life ==
=== Education and priesthood ===
Giovanni Antonio Guadagni was born in 1674 to a noble house in the Medici-ruled Florence as the second of four children to Donato Maria Guadagni (1641-1718) and Maddalena Corsini (???-1679); his maternal uncle was Pope Clement XII. On the maternal side he was related to Saint Andrea Corsini. His siblings were (in order): Tommaso (1668-???), Neri Andrea (1673-1748), and Elisabetta. His father married twice more after Maddalena died: to Maria Maddalena Niccolini (d. 1683) and Maria Alamanni, with whom he had four children.

He received his doctorate in civil and canon law from the Pisan college on 3 May 1696. Guadagni later travelled to Rome to practice law but upon his return to Florence in 1697 decided to become a priest. He entered the Order of Discalced Carmelites in Arezzo (against the wishes of his parents) and assumed the religious name "Giovanni Antonio di San Bernardo" at the convent in Arezzo around 1669. He made his solemn profession of vows on 1 November 1700 and would undertake theological and philosophical studies in Florence at convents that the order managed. He was ordained to the priesthood on 11 March 1702 in Florence.

=== Episcopate ===
Guadagni was later named as the master of the novices and then as the provincial father for his order. It was at the request of the Grand Duke that he was promoted to the episcopate. Pope Benedict XIII appointed him as the Bishop of Arezzo on 20 December 1724 and he received his episcopal consecration a week later in Santa Maria della Scala church from his uncle and future pope Lorenzo Corsini. But he first had to receive a special dispensation from his Carmelite vow not to accept ecclesial dignities, in order to assume the ecclesial office. Guadagni was enthroned in his new see on 9 March 1725. In 1730 he affirmed opposition and his diocese's opposition to Jansenist heresies.

His uncle's election as pope brought the bestowal of the pallium on Guadagni in the chapel of the Quirinal Palace on 22 November 1730. The pallium was normally only bestowed on metropolitan archbishops. In his uncle's pontificate, as a cardinal-nephew, he pursued the pope's pastoral and spiritual plans.

=== Cardinalate ===
Pope Clement XII raised him to the cardinalate on 24 September 1731 as the Cardinal-Deacon of Santi Silvestro e Martino ai Monti and he accepted in obedience to the pope. Guadagni arrived in Rome from Arezzo on 7 November and then entered though Porta Pia on 11 November before receiving the red hat on 22 November and his titular church on 17 December. Guadagni was enthroned in his church on 30 December at a solemn Mass. He was appointed to several important congregations in the Roman Curia and held posts in the Congregation of Bishops and Regulars and the Congregation for Rites amongst others. In 1732 he assumed the duties as the Vicar General of Rome after having resigned from his see in Arezzo. Guadagni was later appointed as the Cardinal-Bishop of Frascati in 1750 and also became the Vice-Dean of the College of Cardinals. On 10 April 1750 (two months after being made the Frascati titular head) he entered the Frascati suburbicarian see to commence a pastoral visit and oversaw the restoration of several churches while presiding over Confirmations and other Masses as well as leading rosaries. He later became the Cardinal-Bishop of Porto e Santa Rufina in 1756.

He participated in the conclave in 1740 that elected Pope Benedict XIV and also participated in the conclave in 1758 that elected Pope Clement XIII. Guadagni served as the camerlengo from 1743 until 1756.

=== Death ===
He died in Rome in 1759 and was buried at the left side of the main altar in Santa Maria della Scala in the tomb that he had constructed for himself. He also composed the inscription that was placed on the tomb. He became reputed for his holiness and was said to have been buried with the odor of saintliness.

== Beatification process ==
The beatification process began in 1763 with an informative process tasked with research into the late cardinal's life and his virtues. On 11 February 1718, the cause was officially opened, granting Guadagni the title of Servant of God. But the cause stalled at some point and remained dormant until it was reactivated under Pope Pius XI on 26 November 1938. But the cause stalled at a later point and remains so at present.
