= Giacomo Lanfredini =

Italian Roman Catholic cardinal

- Cardinal-Deacon of Santa Maria in Portico
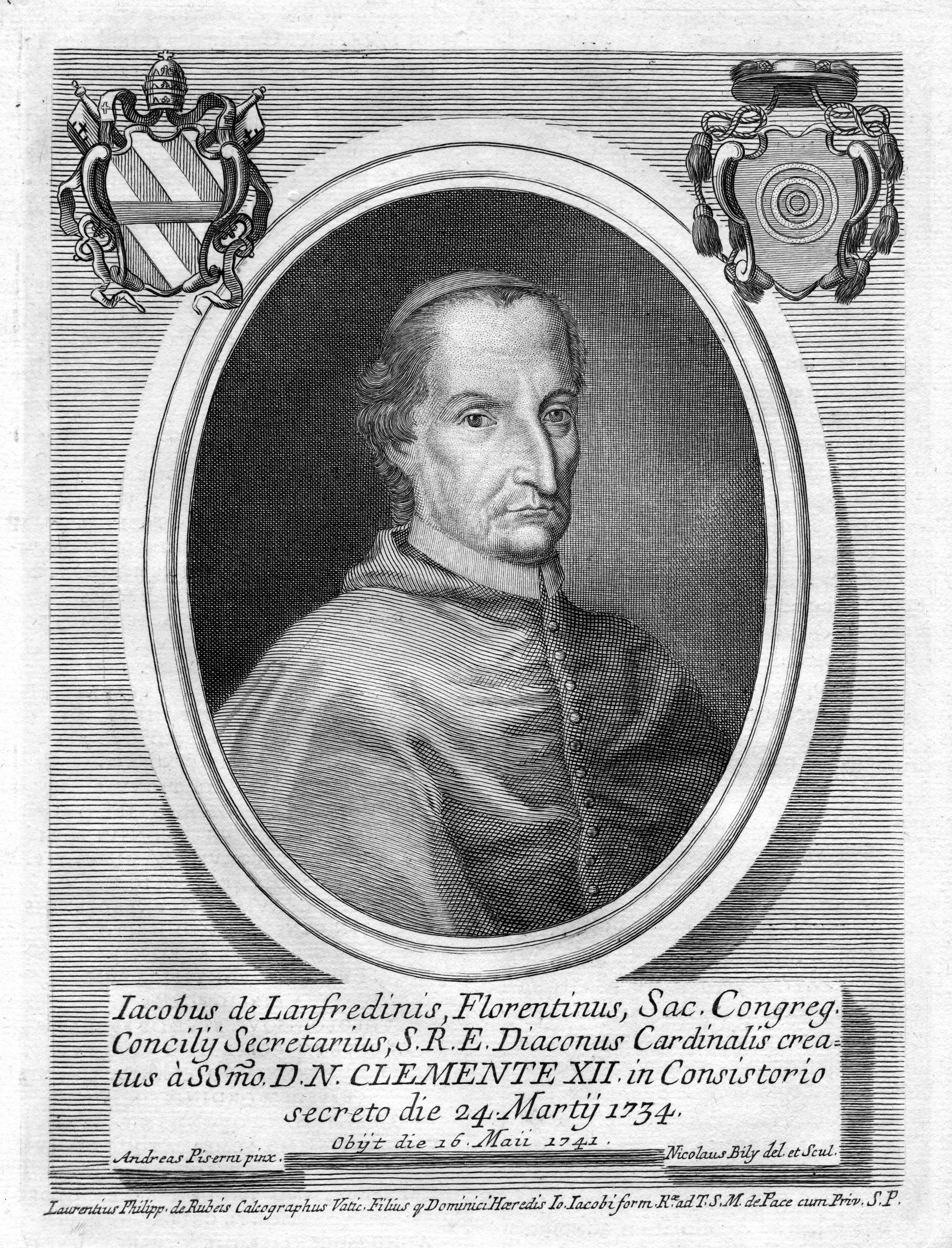
- Church: Catholic Church
- In office: 1734–1741
- Predecessor: Carlo Collicola
- Successor: Carlo Maria Sacripante
- Previous post: Bishop of Osimo e Cingoli (1734–1740)

Orders
- Ordination: March 16, 1727 by Pope Benedict XIII
- Consecration: April 4, 1734 by Giovanni Antonio Guadagni
- Created cardinal: April 12, 1734
- Rank: Cardinal Deacon

Personal details
- Born: 26 October 1670 Florence, Italy
- Died: 16 May 1741 (age 70) Rome, Italy

Giacomo Lanfredini (26 October 1670 – 16 May 1741) was a Roman Catholic cardinal who served as Cardinal-Deacon of Santa Maria in Portico (1734–1741) and Bishop of Osimo e Cingoli (1734–1740).

== Biography ==
Giacomo Lanfredini was born to a noble family in Florence, Italy, the son of Costanza Sati. He studied at the attended the University of Pisa in 1699 where he studied law under Giuseppe Averani. He was named as canon of the cathedral chapter of Florence by the Grand Duke of Tuscany Cosimo III de' Medici and practiced law under Pomponio de Vecchis. He served as vicar general for Cardinal Nicolò Acciaioli and later as vicar general for Cardinal Fabrizio Paolucci. He was named as the first auditor of the Grand Duke of Tuscany but declined instead accepting a position as advocate. In 1721, he earned the title prelature Amadori (defender of the causes of the poor) and thereafter was known as Lanfredini-Amadori. In 1724, he delivered the oration for the funeral of Pope Innocent XIII; and in 1730, the oration De eligendo Pontifice for the election of the new Pontiff Clement XII.

Lanfredini was ordained on March 16, 1727, by Pope Benedict XIII. He was appointed successively as Relator of the Sacred Congregation of Good Government, Auditor of the Camerlengo of the Holy Roman Church, Canonist of the Apostolic Penitentiary (1728), Secretary of the Sacred Congregation of the Tridentine Council (1730), Canon of the patriarchal Vatican basilica (1730), Voter of the Supreme Tribunal of the Apostolic Signature (1731), Datary of the Apostolic Penitentiary (1733) and later regent. He served as counselor for Pope Innocent XIII, Pope Benedict XIII, and Pope Clement XII. On March 24, 1734, he was named cardinal deacon in the consistory of March 24, 1734, and installed on April 12, 1734, in the deaconry of Santo Maria in Portico Campitelli.

On September 15, 1734, he was named Bishop of Osimo e Cingoli. On April 4, 1734, he was consecrated bishop by Giovanni Antonio Guadagni, Cardinal-Priest of Santi Silvestro e Martino ai Monti and vicar general of Rome, assisted by Tommaso Cervini, Titular Latin Patriarch of Jerusalem, and Giuseppe Maria Feroni, Titular Archbishop of Damascus. On May 15, 1739, he was appointed Prefect of the Sacred Congregation of Religious Immunity. He participated in the conclave of 1740 which elected Pope Benedict XIV. On September 15, 1740, he resigned as Bishop of Osimo e Cingoli with the right to name his successor. On December 17, 1740, he was named Apostolic visitor of the Reverend Fabric of St. Peter's and later Apostolic visitor of the Archhospital of Santo Spirito in Rome.

Lanfrdini died on May 16, 1741, in Rome. He was buried in the church he founded, SS. Trinità in Monte Citorio, a Paulist church in Rome.

Catholic Church titles
Preceded by Ferdinando Agostino Bernabei	Bishop of Osimo e Cingoli; 1734–1740	Succeeded by Pompeo Compagnoni
Preceded by Carlo Collicola	Cardinal-Deacon of Santa Maria in Portico; 1734–1741	Succeeded by Carlo Maria Sacripante
