= Vincenzo Ludovico Gotti =

Italian Catholic cardinal and theologian (1664–1742)

His eminence Vincenzo Ludovico Gotti OP
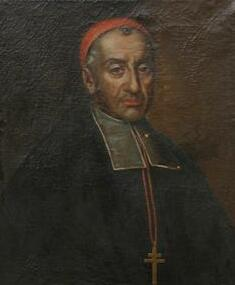
- Church: Catholic Church
- Other post: Latin Patriarch of Jerusalem

Orders
- Created cardinal: 30 April 1728 by Pope Benedict XIII
- Rank: Cardinal Priest

Personal details
- Born: Bologna
- Died: 18 September 1742
- Profession: Theology, Philosophy
- Education: University of Salamanca

Vincenzo Ludovico Gotti OP (5 September 1664 – 18 September 1742) was an Italian Catholic cardinal and theologian.

== Life ==
Gotti was born in Bologna. Educated by Jesuits, he entered the Dominican Order at the age of sixteen. After studies in Salamanca in Spain, he was assigned to teach theology and philosophy at various schools of the Dominican Order. In 1688 Gotti was professor of philosophy at the Dominican College of Saint Thomas, the future Pontifical University of Saint Thomas Aquinas, Angelicum. He also taught in Mantua and Bologna.

In 1708, Gotti was elected Prior of the Dominican monastery in Bologna. On 30 April 1728 Pope Benedict XIII made him Cardinal Priest and appointed him Patriarch of Jerusalem.

Together with Charles René Billuart, Gotti was the leading proponent of the Thomistic school in his time. His writings include several polemics against Lutherans and Calvinism as well as commentaries on Thomas Aquinas.

Gotti was considered papabile (a serious contender to be elected Pope) at the 1740 conclave, when Cardinal Lambertini said to the College of Cardinals "If you wish to elect a saint, choose Gotti; a statesman, Aldrovandi; an honest man, me".

== Notes ==
Preceded by unknown	Titular Latin Patriarch of Jerusalem; 1728–1729	Succeeded by Pompeo Aldrovandi
