= Giovanni Battista Spínola =

Italian Catholic cardinal

Giovanni Battista Spinola (1681–1752) was a Roman Catholic Cardinal. He was born in Genoa at the Republic of Genoa, on 16 July 1681 and was the great-grandson of Cardinal Giambattista Spinola (1615–1704), and the nephew of Cardinal Giambattista Spínola (iuniore).

== Biography ==
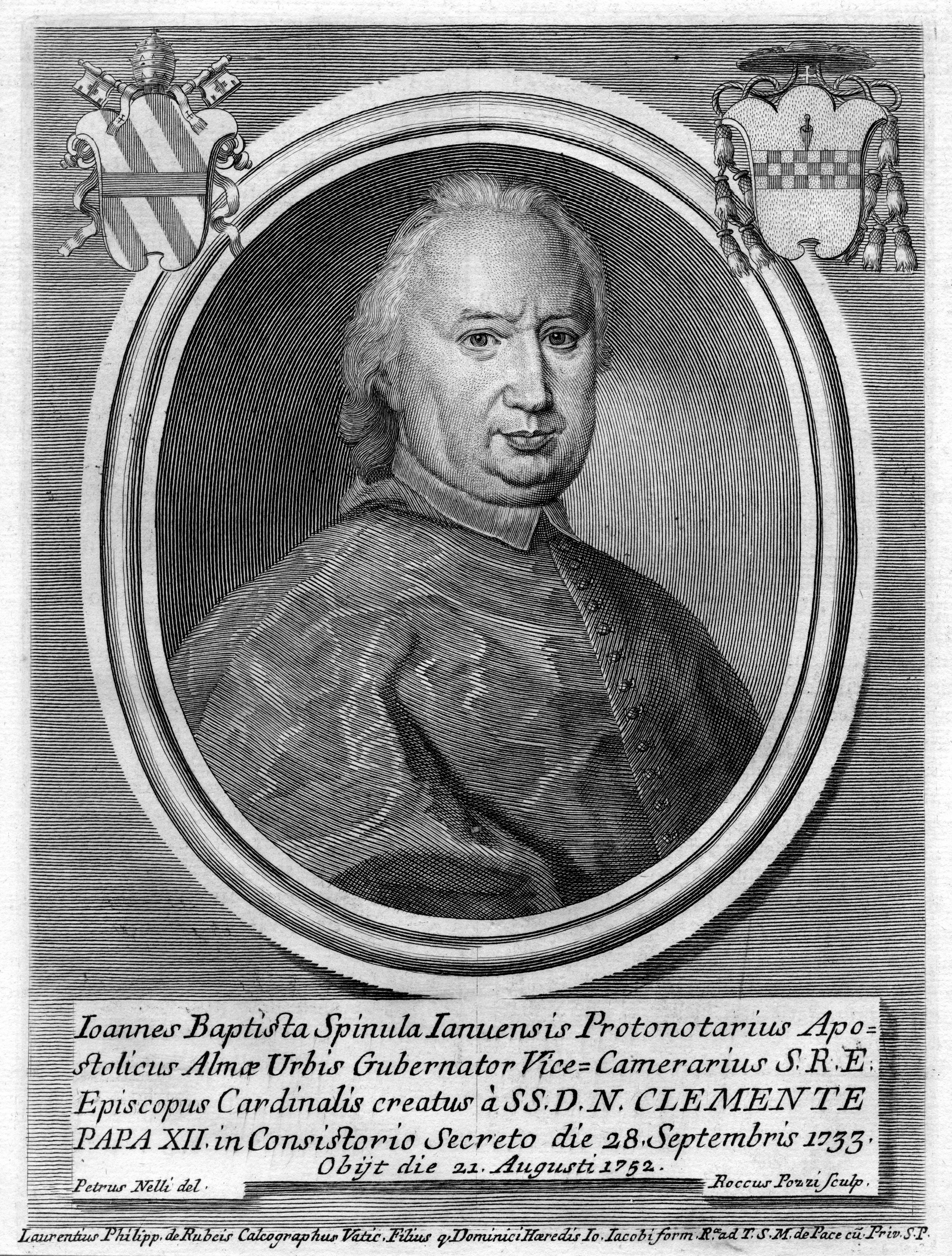
Giovanni Battista Spínola

He was appointed secret valet of His Holiness in 1707 and governor of Benevento in 1712, then speaker of the Congregation of the Consulta and auditor of the Camerlengo of the Holy Roman Church in 1717. In 1719 he became governor of Rimini, then vice-legate in Ravenna and cleric of the Apostolic Chamber (1722), governor of Castelnuovo (1723) and finally Secretary of the Congregation of the Consulta (1724).

Despite these prestigious roles, he did not receive sacred orders before 15 February 1728, conferred on him by Pope Benedict XIII, who appointed him the governor of Rome and Vice-Camerlengo of the Holy Roman Church on 30 May 1728.

He was governor of Rome until he became a cardinal in the consistory of 28 September 1733 by Pope Clement XII, who attributed to him the deaconry of San Cesareo in Palatio.

On 23 September 1743 he was appointed the Cardinal-Priest of Santa Maria degli Angeli, followed by becoming the Cardinal-Bishop of Albano on 15 November 1751. He was ordained as a bishop by Pope Benedict XIV on 9 April 1752 in the Pauline Chapel of the Quirinale.

He died in Albano on 20 August 1752.

== Sources ==
- The Cardinals of the Holy Roman Church

Catholic Church titles
Preceded by Thomas Philip Wallrad de Hénin-Liétard d'Alsace	Cardinal-Deacon of San Cesareo in Palatio; 1733–1743	Succeeded by Giovanni Francesco Albani (cardinal)
Preceded by Camillo Cibo	Cardinal-Priest of Santa Maria degli Angeli; 1743–1751	Succeeded by Girolamo de Bardi
Preceded by Pier Luigi Carafa (iuniore)	Cardinal-Bishop of Albano; 1751–1752	Succeeded by Francesco Scipione Maria Borghese
