= Carlo Gaetano Stampa =

Italian cardinal and archbishop

His Eminence Carlo Gaetano Stampa
- Cardinal, Archbishop of Milan
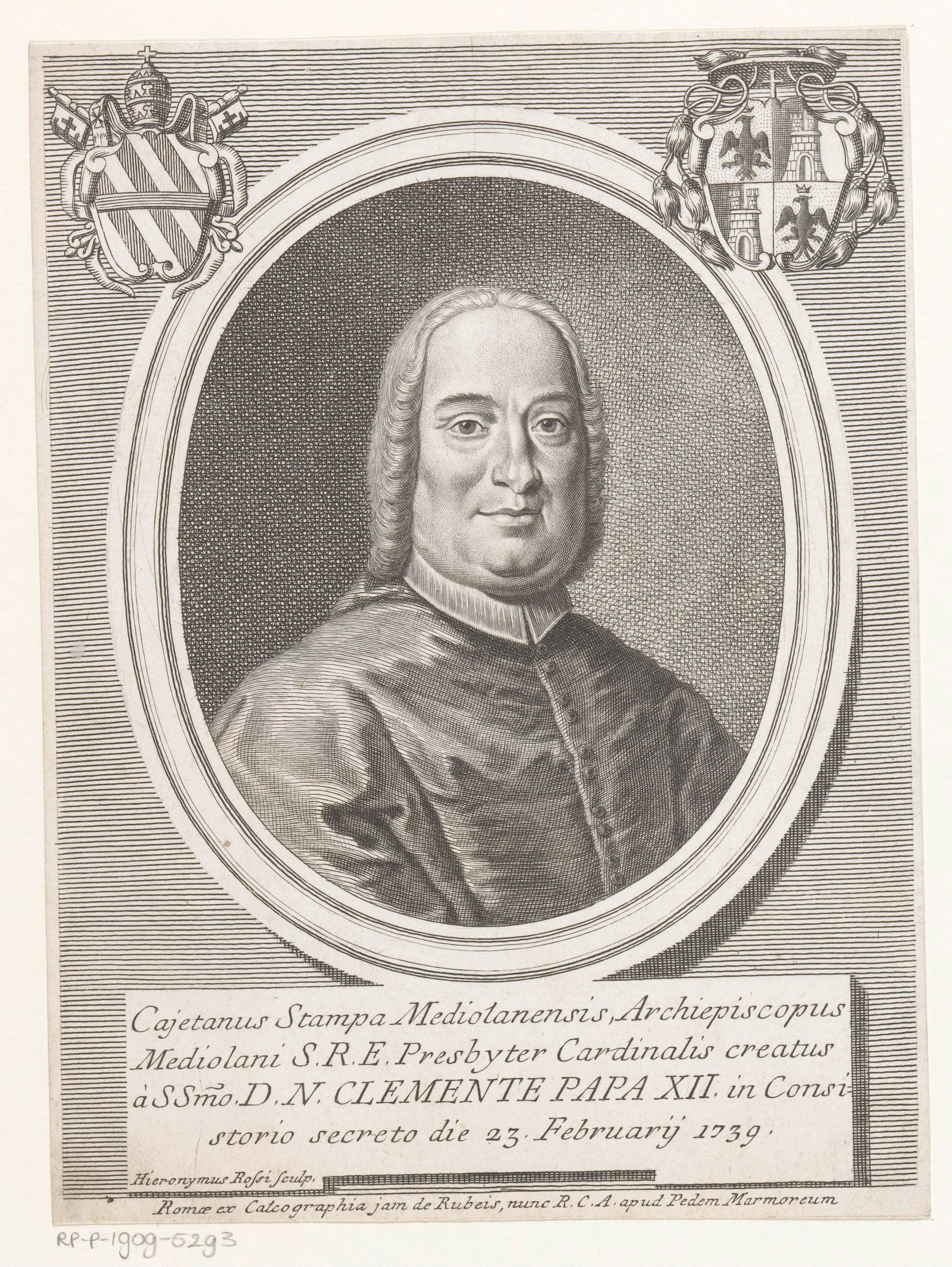
- Church: Catholic Church
- See: Milan
- Appointed: 6 May 1737
- Term ended: 23 December 1742
- Predecessor: Benedetto Erba Odescalchi
- Successor: Giuseppe Pozzobonelli
- Other post: Cardinal Priest of Santi Bonifacio e Alessio

Orders
- Ordination: 31 Oct 1717 (Priest)
- Consecration: 23 Jan 1718 (Bishop) by Ferdinando d'Adda
- Created cardinal: 23 February 1739

Personal details
- Born: 1 November 1667 Milan
- Died: 23 December 1742 (aged 75) Milan
- Buried: Cathedral of Milan
- Coat of arms

Carlo III Gaetano Stampa (1667–1742) was an Italian cardinal and Archbishop of Milan from 1737 to 1742.

== Early life ==
Carlo Gaetano Stampa was born on 1 November 1667 in Milan to count Cristiano Stampa and Giustina of the House of Borromeo. He was cousin to Giuseppe Archinto, Federico Visconti and nephew of Federigo and Saint Charles Borromeo.

Carlo Gaetano entered in the clerical state in his youth, he studied in Rome at the Pontifical Roman Seminary and on 10 July 1698, he earned a doctorate in utroque iure at the University of Pavia. He took up a career as lawyer in Milan. In 1703, he moved to Rome where he entered in the administration of the Papal States: in 1705, he became referendary of the Tribunals of the Apostolic Signature, on 10 December 1706 he was appointed Vice-legate of Romagna, a position he kept until 1709. Later, he was governor of Spoleto and from 1714 to 1717, he was governor of Ancona, where he won a victory over the pirates. In 1716, he was appointed Inquisitor in Malta, but he never moved to such island.

Carlo Gaetano was ordained priest on 31 October 1717 and he was appointed Titular archbishop of Chalcedon on 6 December 1717, being consecrated bishop on 23 Jan 1718 by Cardinal Ferdinando d'Adda in Rome. From 1718 to 1720, he served as Apostolic Nuncio to the Grand Duchy of Tuscany and from 1720 to 1735, he served in the delicate position of Nuncio to the Republic of Venice. In 1735, he returned to Rome because on 12 December 1734, Pope Clement XII had appointed him Secretary of the Congregation for Bishops.

== Archbishop of Milan ==
On 6 May 1737, Carlo Gaetano Stampa was appointed Archbishop of Milan, however he entered in Milan in private form only in July 1738 and he made his formal entry in the town on 10 May 1739. On 23 February 1739, he was appointed Cardinal Priest of Santi Bonifacio e Alessio. He participated to the Papal conclave of 1740, which lasted from February to August.

As Archbishop of Milan, he followed the pastoral approach of his predecessor, stressing the role and the morality of the clergy. Due to his cardiac problems, he could make a pastoral visit only to the town of Abbiategrasso, but he convened all the vicars of the diocese on Milan on 7 June 1742.

He died suddenly in Milan on 23 December 1742. His funeral service was held on 21 January 1743 and his remains were buried in the North transept of the Cathedral of Milan.
