= Troiano Acquaviva d'Aragona =

Italian cardinal (1696–1747)

His Eminence Troiano Acquaviva d'Aragona
- Archbishop of Monreale; Duke of Atri
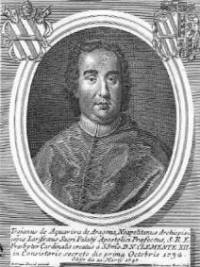
- Church: Catholic Church
- Archdiocese: Monreale
- Appointed: 4 May 1739
- Term ended: 20 Mar 1747
- Predecessor: Juan Álvaro Cienfuegos Villazón
- Successor: Giacomo Bonanno
- Other posts: Cardinal-Priest of Santa Cecilia in Trastevere (1733-1747)

Orders
- Ordination: 17 April 1729
- Consecration: 3 May 1729 by Pope Clement XI
- Created cardinal: 1 October 1732 by Pope Clement XII
- Rank: Cardinal-Priest

Personal details
- Born: 14 January 1696 Atri, Italy
- Died: 17 April 1747 (aged 51) Rome, Papal States
- Buried: Santa Cecilia in Trastevere
- Coat of arms

Troiano Acquaviva of Aragon (14 January 1696 – 20 March 1747) was an Italian cardinal and Catholic archbishop. Acquaviva was from a noble family with close ties to the Spanish crown; he was the nephew of Cardinal Francesco Acquaviva d'Aragona. Created cardinal in 1732, the following year he became cardinal-protector of Santa Cecilia in Trastevere, for which he provided a new façade. In 1734, King Philip V of Spain appointed him Spanish ambassador to the Holy See.

== Biography ==
Troiano Acquaviva was born in Atri, the son of Gian Girolamo Acquaviva d'Aragona, 13th duke of Atri, and his second wife, Eleonora Spinelli. His brother, Girolamo Acquaviva, succeeded to the family title. Troiano was educated in Rome under his uncle Cardinal Francesco Acquaviva d'Aragona. From March to August 1721, he was pontifical vice-delegate in Bologna. In the same year Pope Innocent XIII gave him the government of Ancona, from which he was recalled in 1725 by Pope Benedict XIII, who wanted him to be his major domo in Rome.

Troiano Acquaviva, was ordained a priest on 17 April 1729. The next day, he was elected titular bishop of Filippopoli di Arabia and consecrated bishop on 3 May that year in Benevento by Pope Clement XI. On 14 May 1729, he was appointed prefect of the Pontifical Household and 6 July Prefect of the Apostolic Palace. On 14 August 1730, he was appointed titular Archbishop of Larissa.

He was created cardinal by Pope Clement XII in the consistory of 1 October 1732, and on 17 November that year he received the titular designation of Santi Quirico e Giulitta, whose restoration was not quite complete. On 19 January 1733 succeeded his uncle at the titular church of Santa Cecilia in Trastevere. Acquaviva underwrote a new façade. In 1732, Charles of Bourbon began to make use of Cardinal Acquaviva as his unofficial, representative to the Holy See.

In 1734, Philip V of Spain named Acquaviva Spanish ambassador to the Holy See, just as his uncle had been some time before. He then moved to the ambassador's residence, the Palazzo di Spagna. From 1738, he was cardinal protector of the Kingdom of Naples and Sicily. On 4 May 1739, he was elected Archbishop of Monreale.

He participated in the conclave of 1740, in which he was the bearer of veto by Philip V of Spain against the election of Cardinal Pier Marcellino Corradini. He was also an adviser to Pope Benedict XIV, in the matter of the Church's charges against King Charles III of Naples during the war for the succession to the throne of Austria.

On the recommendation of the powerful Don Lelio Caraffa, Duke of Maddaloni. he employed a young Giacomo Casanova as a clerical scribe. When Casanova became the scapegoat for a scandal involving a local pair of star-crossed lovers, Cardinal Acquaviva dismissed him, thanking him for his service,

From April 1743, he was cardinal protector of Spain and from 3 February 1744 to 25 January 1745, Camerlengo of the Sacred College of Cardinals.

In 1745, succeeding his brother Domenico, he had become the eighteenth Duke of Atri. He died on 20 March 1747, in Rome, after a long and painful illness; Pope Benedict XIV presided at his funeral. He was buried in the Basilica of Santa Cecilia in Trastevere.

== Bibliography ==
- Corral Corredoira, Pilar Diez del (2017). "'Il dilettevole trattenimento': El teatro del cardinal Troyano Acquaviva en el Palacio de España en Roma". Music in Art: International Journal for Music Iconography. 42 (1–2): 59–69. ISSN 1522-7464.
