= Annibale Albani =

Italian cardinal (1682-1751)

His Eminence Annibale Albani
- Archpriest of St. Peter's Basilica
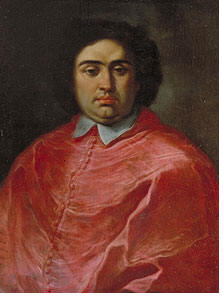
- Appointed: 4 January 1712
- Term ended: 21 October 1751
- Other posts: Cardinal-bishop of Porto e Santa Rufina; Cardinal-priest of San Clemente

Orders
- Ordination: 18 September 1712 (deacon); 28 October 1722 (priest)
- Consecration: 15 August 1730 (bishop) by Francesco Barberini
- Created cardinal: 23 December 1711 by Pope Clement XI
- Rank: Cardinal-bishop

Personal details
- Born: 15 August 1682 Urbino, Papal States
- Died: 21 October 1751 (aged 69) Rome, Papal States
- Buried: St. Peter's Basilica

Annibale Albani (15 August 1682 – 21 September 1751) was an Italian catholic Cardinal.

== Biography ==
Annibale Albani was born in Urbino as a member of the Albani family, of Albanian-Italian origin. His parents were Orazio Albani, brother of Pope Clement XI, and Maria Bernardina Ondedei-Zonghi. A nephew of the Pope, he became Cardinal Bishop of Sabina (1711). He was the elder brother of Cardinal Alessandro Albani, an even more famous collector.

In 1709, during the War of the Spanish Succession, he was appointed papal nuncio in Vienna. In 1710, he went to Dresden, where he was instrumental in securing the conversion of the future King Augustus III of Poland from Lutheranism to Roman Catholicism. He continued to be active in papal diplomacy until the 1740s.

As a patron of ecclesiastical literature, he left a valuable library, a gallery of paintings and sculpture, and a cabinet of coins that eventually was added to the Vatican collection. He edited, in two volumes, the letters, briefs, and bulls of Clement XI (1724), the Menologium Græcorum (1727), and historical memoirs of Urbino (1722–24).

== Sources ==
- Sofri, Gianni (1960). "Albani, Annibale". www.treccani.it (in Italian). Dizionario Biografico degli Italiani.
- Williams, George L. (2024). Papal Genealogy: The Families and Descendants of the Popes. McFarland Inc. ISBN 9781476632278.117
