= Silvio Valenti Gonzaga =

Italian nobleman and Catholic cardinal (1690–1756)

His Eminence Silvio Valenti Gonzaga
- Cardinal Secretary of State
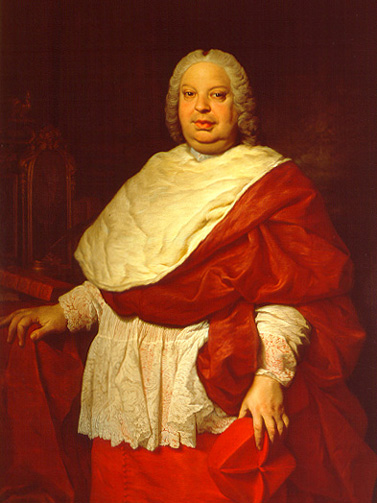
- Church: Roman Catholic
- In office: 1740–1756
- Other posts: Cardinal-Bishop of Sabina (1753–56); Prefect of the Congregation for Propagation of the Faith (1747–56)

Orders
- Ordination: 3 June 1731
- Consecration: 22 July 1731 by Juan Álvaro Cienfuegos Villazón
- Created cardinal: 19 December 1738 by Pope Clement XII
- Rank: Cardinal-Bishop

Personal details
- Born: 1 March 1690 Mantua, Duchy of Mantua
- Died: 28 August 1756 (aged 66) Viterbo, Papal States
- Buried: Viterbo Cathedral

Silvio Valenti Gonzaga (1 March 1690 – 28 August 1756) was an Italian nobleman and Catholic cardinal.

== Biography ==
Gonzaga was born in Mantua. He served as papal nuncio to Flanders, 1731–1736, and was elevated to the rank of cardinal in 1738 by Pope Clement XII. On 15 May 1747, he was given the titular church of San Callisto. He died in Viterbo.

He was known as a patron of arts and sciences, and his villa outside of Porta Pia had a botanical collection. He owned a large library, collected the latest instruments of measurement, and sponsored literary salons. He owned a large collection of paintings (including the Portrait of Lorenzo Cybo), which, after his death, was sold on 18 May 1763 at Amsterdam and the paintings by Salvator Rosa and Francesco Solimena dispersed in several locations.

His nephew Luigi Valenti Gonzaga (1725 – 1808) also was named cardinal. Luigi's brother, Marquis Carlo Valenti Gonzaga (1718-1782), was a statesman and ambassador for the papal state; he also was a prominent patron in Mantua and amassed a large library.
