= Cardinals created by Benedict XIV =

Catholic appointments from 1743 to 1756

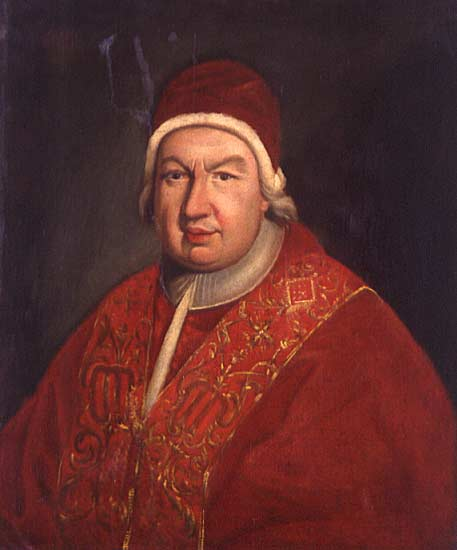
Pope Benedict XIV (1675–1758).

Pope Benedict XIV (r. 1740–58) created 64 cardinals in seven consistories.

== September 9, 1743 ==
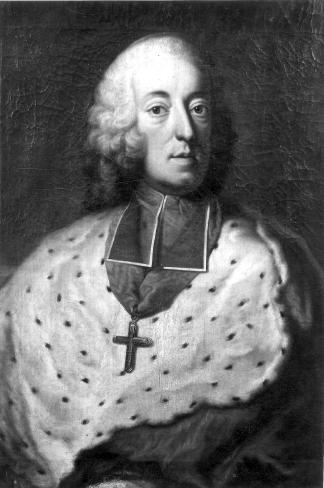
John Theodore of Bavaria (1703-63), made a cardinal on September 9, 1743.

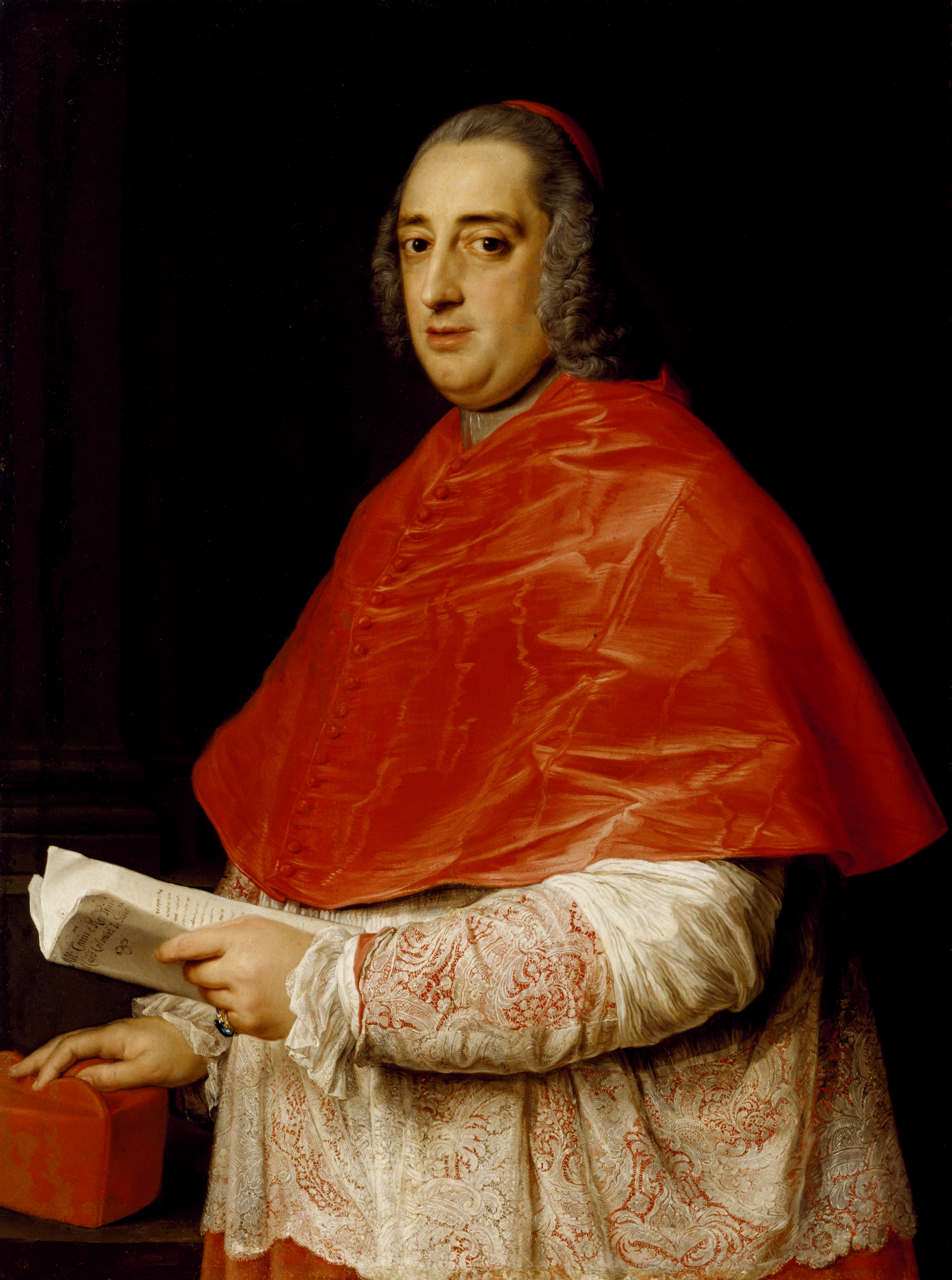
Prospero Colonna di Sciarra (1707-65), made a cardinal on September 9, 1743.

1. John Theodore of Bavaria ((created in pectore, published on January 17, 1746)
2. Joaquín Fernández de Portocarrero
3. Camillo Paolucci
4. Raffaele Cosimo de' Girolami
5. Carlo Alberto Guidoboni Cavalchini
6. Giovanni Battista Barni
7. Giacomo Oddi
8. Federico Marcello Lante
9. Marcello Crescenzi
10. Giorgio Doria
11. Francesco Landi
12. Giuseppe Pozzobonelli
13. Francesco Ricci
14. Antonio Maria Ruffo
15. Mario Bolognetti
16. Girolamo Colonna di Sciarra
17. Prospero Colonna di Sciarra
18. Carlo Leopoldo Calcagnini
19. Alessandro Tanara
20. Filippo Maria de Monti
21. Girolamo de Bardi
22. Luigi Maria Lucini
23. Fortunato Tamburini
24. Gioacchino Besozzi
25. Domenico Orsini d'Aragona

== April 10, 1747 ==
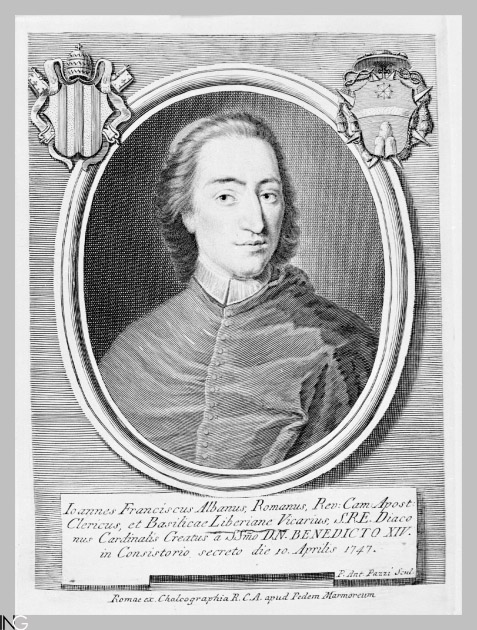
Gian Francesco Albani (1720-1803), made a cardinal on April 10, 1747.

1. Álvaro Eugenio de Mendoza Caamaño y Sotomayor
2. Daniele Delfino
3. Raniero Felice Simonetti
4. Frédéric-Jérôme de la Rochefoucauld de Roye
5. François-Armand-Auguste de Rohan-Soubise-Ventadour
6. Ferdinand Julius von Troyer
7. Giovanni Battista Mesmer
8. José Manoel da Câmara
9. Gian Francesco Albani
10. Mario Millini
11. Carlo Vittorio Amedeo delle Lanze

== July 3, 1747 ==
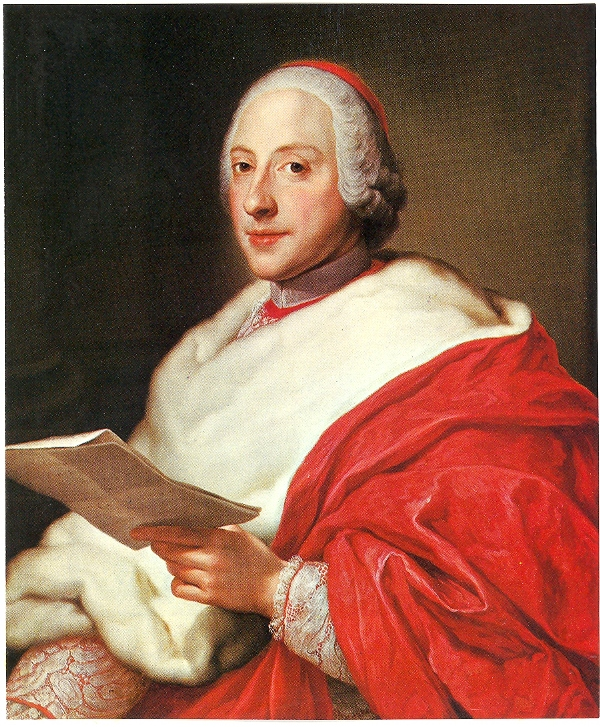
Henry Benedict Stuart (1725-1807), made a cardinal on July 3, 1747.

1. Henry Benedict Stuart

== November 26, 1753 ==
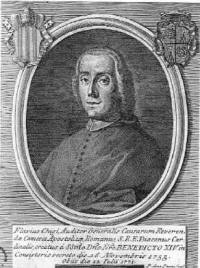
Flavio Chigi (1711–71), made a cardinal on November 26, 1753.

1. Giuseppe Maria Feroni
2. Fabrizio Serbelloni
3. Giovanni Francesco Stoppani
4. Luca Melchiore Tempi
5. Carlo Francesco Durini
6. Enrico Enríquez
7. Cosimo Imperiali
8. Vincenzo Malvezzi
9. Luigi Mattei
10. Giovanni Giacomo Millo
11. Clemente Argenvilliers
12. Antonio Andrea Galli
13. Flavio Chigi
14. Giovanni Francesco Banchieri
15. Giuseppe Livizzani
16. Luigi Maria Torrigiani

== April 22, 1754 ==
1. Antonino Sersale

== December 18, 1754 ==
1. Luis Antonio Fernández de Córdoba

== April 5, 1756 ==
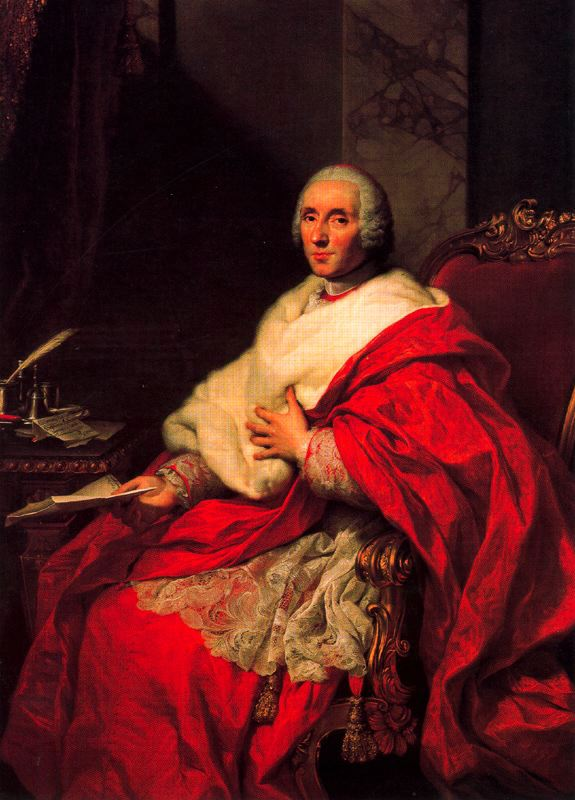
Alberico Archinto (1698-1758), made a cardinal on April 5, 1756.

1. Nicolas de Saulx-Tavannes
2. Alberico Archinto
3. Giovanni Battista Rovero
4. Francisco de Solís Folch de Cardona
5. Johannes Joseph von Trautson
6. Paul d'Albert de Luynes
7. Étienne-René Potier de Gesvres
8. Franz Konrad Kasimir Ignaz von Rodt
9. Francisco de Saldanha da Gama
