= 1758 conclave =

Election of Catholic Pope Clement XIII

Papal conclave May–July 1758

Dates and location
- 15 May – 6 July 1758; Apostolic Palace, Papal States

Key officials
- Dean: Rainiero d'Elci
- Sub-dean: Giovanni Antonio Guadagni
- Camerlengo: Henry Benedict Stuart
- Protopriest: Thomas-Philipp d'Alcase
- Protodeacon: Alessandro Albani

Election
- Vetoed: Carlo Cavalchini

Elected pope
- Carlo di Rezzonico; Name taken: Clement XIII
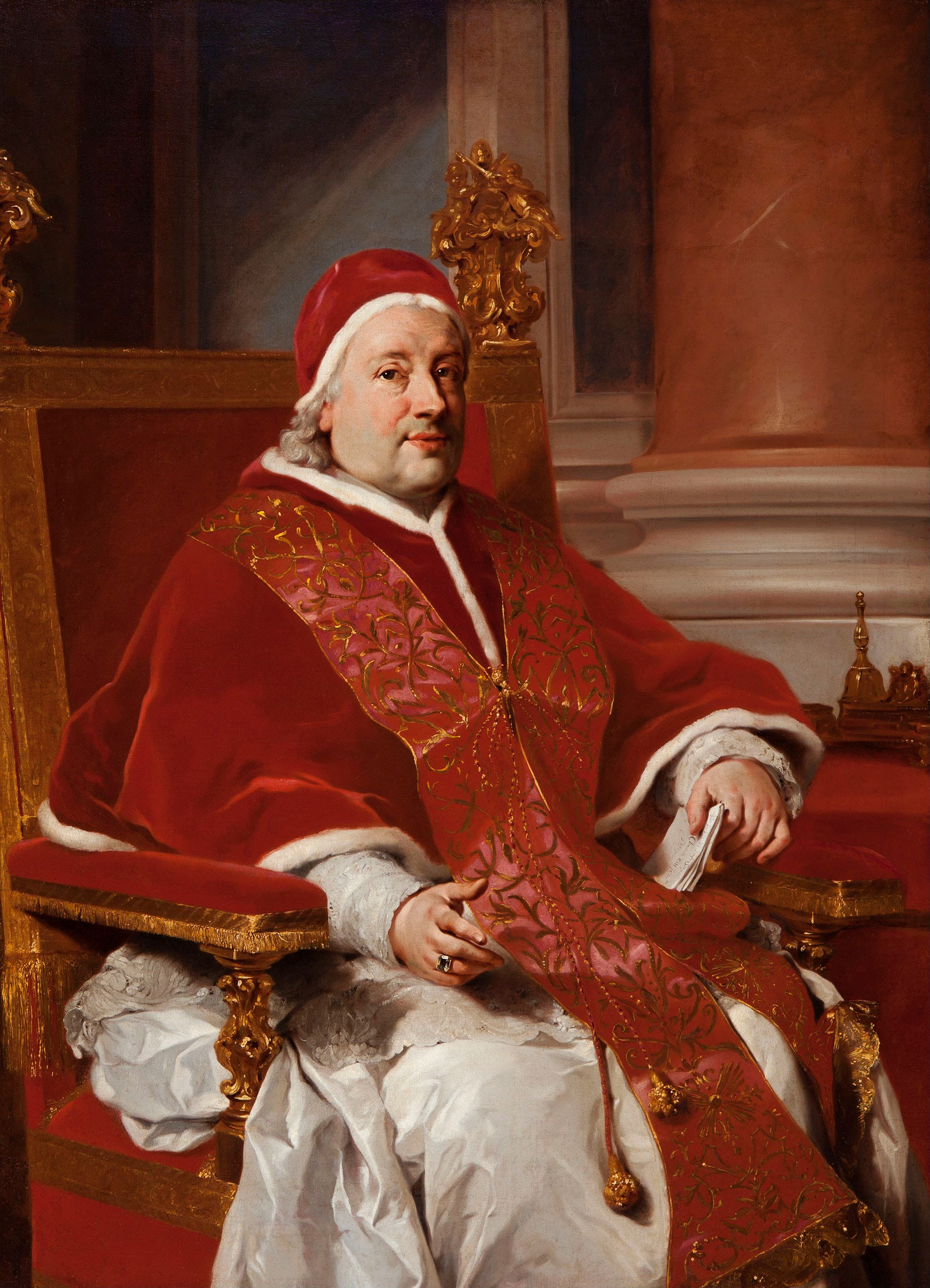

The 1758 papal conclave (15 May – 6 July) was convoked after the death of Pope Benedict XIV on 3 May 1758 and ended with the election of Cardinal Carlo di Rezzonico, who took the name Clement XIII.

== Divisions among the cardinals ==
The College of Cardinals was divided into several factions, which initially formed two blocs:

- Curial group – it included two factions of curial Cardinals: anziani – the small party of the Cardinals created by Pope Clement XII with his Cardinal-nephew Neri Maria Corsini as leader; and zelanti – the group of the conservative Cardinals, headed by Cardinal Giuseppe Spinelli, who generally opposed any secular influence on the Church.
- Union of Crowns – it included representatives and allies of the Catholic courts. The interests of Ferdinand VI of Spain were represented by Portocarrero, those of Charles V of Sicily/Charles VII of Naples – by Orsini, and those of Maria Theresa of Austria and her consort Francis I, Holy Roman Emperor by Alessandro Albani (also protector of Sardinia) and von Rodt. The French faction was leaderless at the time of death of Benedict XIV, because Cardinal-protector of France Pierre Guérin de Tencin died on March 2, 1758. King Louis XV of France appointed Cardinal Prospero Colonna di Sciarra as his successor, but this nomination became publicly known only on June 9, almost a month after the beginning of the conclave.

Many cardinals created by Benedict XIV (called "Juniors") did not belong to any faction, but majority of them aligned themselves with "Union of Crowns", particularly with Spanish protector Portocarrero.

During the conclave, however, these two groups mixed with each other. Near the end of the conclave, on the one side there was the Imperial faction together with zelanti, and on the other side Anziani, together with the Bourbon faction (defending the interests of the Bourbon crowns).

Because of the absence of the political representatives of the main Catholic courts the ambassadors of France and the Empire asked the electors for delay voting until their arrival. This demand was rejected before the conclave began.

== Beginning and early candidates ==
Only twenty-seven cardinals entered the conclave on May 15. Eighteen more cardinals arrived in Rome by June 29. In the meantime, however, Cardinal Bardi had to leave the conclave due to illness.

No serious candidates were proposed in the early ballots. In the first scrutiny on May 16 the greatest number of votes (eight in the ballot and three more in the accessus) were received Dean of the College of Cardinals Rainiero d'Elci, who was 88 years old. It does not mean, however, that no efforts to obtain the support for the candidates were made by the leaders present in the conclave. In particular Corsini worked vigorously for the election of Giuseppe Spinelli, leader of the zelanti, but met with the strong opposition of Orsini, Cardinal Protector of the Kingdom of Naples. The protector of Spain, Portocarrero, also rejected Spinelli, and was able to join many of the "Juniors" to his party. Finally, the candidature of Spinelli had to be withdrawn.

The first candidate with serious chances for election was Alberico Archinto, Secretary of State and Vice-Chancellor of the deceased pope. He had a strong support both among zelanti and some of the "Crown-Cardinals", but the faction of Corsini did not agree to support him and produced as counter-candidate Marcello Crescenzi. Eventually, as had occurred many times before and later, the candidatures of Archinto and Crescenzi eliminated each other.

== Arrival of the French cardinals ==
Gradually, the representatives of royal courts arrived in Rome with instructions from their monarchs. On June 4 entered Cardinal Luynes with the instructions of Louis XV. Five days later he officially announced the nomination of Cardinal Prospero Colonna di Sciarra to the post of Protector of France. But the Imperial Cardinal von Rodt was still awaited.

During the next days the new candidate Carlo Alberto Guidobono Cavalchini, received still more votes, promoted by Corsini and Portocarrero working together. On June 19 he obtained twenty-one votes, on June 21 twenty-six, and in the evening of June 22 as many as twenty-eight out of forty-three, which meant that he was only one vote short of being elected. But after that ballot Cardinal Luynes informed the Dean of the Sacred College Rainiero d’Elci of the official veto of the King of France against Cavalchini. France opposed Cavalchini because of his support of the beatification of Robert Bellarmine and in the matters connected with the anti-Jansenist bull Unigenitus. The exclusion met with strong protests, but Cavalchini himself said, "It is a manifest proof that God deems me unworthy to fill the functions of his vicar upon earth".

After the collapse of Cavalchini's candidacy, Portocarrero advanced as a new candidate Paolucci, but he was rejected by French, who – together with the faction of Corsini, voted again for Crescenzi.

== Arrival of Cardinal von Rodt ==
The arrival of Cardinal von Rodt on June 29 with the instructions of the Imperial Court was the turning point of the conclave. He initially tried to achieve an agreement with the French, but having failed, he turned toward the zelanti faction. Direct negotiations between von Rodt and Spinelli resulted in the proposal for election of the Venetian Cardinal Carlo Rezzonico, bishop of Padua. On July 6 in the morning the bishop of Padua received eight votes in the ballot and four additional in the accessus. Portocarrero, Albani and the French cardinals initially opposed, but finally agreed for him. After the consultations of French Cardinals with ambassador Laon it became clear that Rezzonico would be elected to the Papacy.

== Election of Pope Clement XIII ==
On July 6 in the evening Carlo Rezzonico was elected Pope, receiving thirty-one votes out of forty-four, one more than the required majority of two-thirds. The remaining thirteen (including his own) fell to Cardinal Dean Rainiero d'Elci. Rezzonico accepted his election and took the name of Clement XIII, in honour of Pope Clement XII, who had elevated him to the cardinalate in 1737. He was crowned on July 16 in the loggia of the patriarchal Vatican Basilica by protodeacon Alessandro Albani.

== List of cardinal electors ==
=== List of participants ===
Pope Benedict XIV died on 3 May 1758. Forty-five out of fifty-five cardinals participated in the subsequent conclave. Only forty-four, however, voted in the final ballot, because Cardinal Bardi left the conclave because of illness on June 24:

- Rainiero d'Elci (created Cardinal on December 20, 1737) – Cardinal-Bishop of Ostia e Velletri; commendatario of S. Sabina; Dean of the Sacred College of Cardinals; Prefect of the S.C. of Ceremonies
- Giovanni Antonio Guadagni (September 24, 1731) – Cardinal-Bishop of Porto e Santa Rufina; Sub-Dean of the Sacred College of Cardinals; Vicar General of Rome
- Francesco Scipione Maria Borghese (July 6, 1729) – Cardinal-Bishop of Albano; Cardinal-protector of Order of Franciscans
- Giuseppe Spinelli (January 17, 1735) – Cardinal-Bishop of Palestrina; Prefect of the S.C. for the Propagation of Faith
- Carlo Maria Sacripante (September 30, 1739) – Cardinal-Bishop of Frascati
- Joaquín Fernández Portocarrero Mendoza (September 9, 1743) – Cardinal-Bishop of Sabina; Prefect of the S.C. of Indulgences and Sacred Relics; Cardinal-protector of the Kingdom of Spain
- Carlo Rezzonico (December 20, 1737) – Cardinal-Priest of S. Marco; Bishop of Padua
- Domenico Passionei (June 23, 1738) – Cardinal-Priest of S. Prassede; commendatario of S. Bartolomeo all’Isola; Secretary of Apostolic Briefs; Librarian of the Holy Roman Church
- Camillo Paolucci (September 9, 1743) – Cardinal-Priest of S. Maria in Trastevere; commendatario of SS. Giovanni e Paolo; Cardinal-protector of the Order Carmelites
- Carlo Alberto Guidobono Cavalchini (September 9, 1743) – Cardinal-Priest of S. Maria della Pace; Prefect of the S.C. of Bishops and Regulars
- Giacomo Oddi (September 9, 1743) – Cardinal-Priest of S. Anastasia; Archbishop of Viterbo e Toscanella
- Federico Marcello Lante (September 9, 1743) – Cardinal-Priest of S. Silvestro in Capite; Governor of Balneario
- Marcello Crescenzi (September 9, 1743) – Cardinal-Priest of S. Maria in Transpontina; Archbishop of Ferrara
- Giorgio Doria (September 9, 1743) – Cardinal-Priest of S. Cecilia; commendatario of S. Agostino; Prefect of the S.C. of Good Government
- Giuseppe Pozzobonelli (September 9, 1743) – Cardinal-Priest of S. Maria in Via; Archbishop of Milan
- Girolamo de Bardi (September 9, 1743) – Cardinal-Priest of S. Maria degli Angeli alla Terme
- Fortunato Tamburini (September 9, 1743) – Cardinal-Priest of S. Callisto; Prefect of the S.C. of Rites
- Daniele Delfino (April 10, 1747) – Cardinal-Priest of S. Maria sopra Minerva; archbishop of Udine
- Carlo Vittorio Amedeo delle Lanze (April 10, 1747) – Cardinal-Priest of S. Sisto; Titular Archbishop of Nicosia
- Henry Benedict Stuart (July 3, 1747) – Cardinal-Priest of SS. XII Apostoli; commendatario of S. Maria in Portico; Archpriest of the patriarchal Vatican Basilica; Camerlengo of the Sacred College of Cardinals
- Giuseppe Maria Feroni (November 26, 1753) – Cardinal-Priest of S. Pancrazio
- Fabrizio Serbelloni (November 26, 1753) – Cardinal-Priest of S. Stefano al Monte Celio; Legate in Bologna
- Giovanni Francesco Stoppani (November 26, 1753) – Cardinal-Priest of S. Martino ai Monti; Legate in Romagna
- Luca Melchiore Tempi (November 26, 1753) – Cardinal-Priest of S. Croce in Gerusalemme
- Carlo Francesco Durini (November 26, 1753) – Cardinal-Priest of SS. IV Coronati; Archbishop of Pavia
- Cosimo Imperiali (November 26, 1753) – Cardinal-Priest of S. Clemente
- Vincenzo Malvezzi (November 26, 1753) – Cardinal-Priest of SS. Marcellino e Pietro; Archbishop of Bologna
- Clemente Argenvilliers (November 26, 1753) – Cardinal-Priest of SS. Trinita al Monte Pincio; Prefect of the S.C. of the Tridentine Council
- Antonio Andrea Galli (November 26, 1753) – Cardinal-Priest of S. Pietro in Vincoli; Grand penitentiary; Prefect of the S.C. of Index
- Antonino Sersale (April 22, 1754) – Cardinal-Priest of S. Pudenziana; Archbishop of Naples
- Alberico Archinto (April 5, 1756) – Cardinal-Priest of S. Lorenzo in Damaso; Cardinal Secretary of State; Vice-Chancellor of the Holy Roman Church
- Giovanni Battista Rotario (April 5, 1756) – Cardinal-Priest of S. Crisogono; Archbishop of Turin
- Paul d'Albert de Luynes (April 5, 1756) – Cardinal-Priest of S. Tommaso in Parione; Archbishop of Sens
- Étienne-René Potier de Gesvres (April 5, 1756) – Cardinal-Priest of S. Agnese fuori le mura; Bishop of Beauvais
- Franz Konrad Kasimir Ignaz von Rodt (April 5, 1756) – Cardinal-Priest of S. Maria del Popolo; Bishop of Constance
- Alessandro Albani (July 16, 1721) – Cardinal-Deacon of S. Maria in Via Lata; commendatario of S. Maria in Cosmedin; Protodeacon of the Sacred College of Cardinals; Cardinal-protector of the Habsburg monarchy and of the Kingdom of Sardinia
- Neri Maria Corsini (August 14, 1730) – Cardinal-Deacon of S. Eustachio; Archpriest of the patriarchal Lateran Basilica; Secretary of the Supreme S.C. Congregation of the Roman and Universal Inquisition; Prefect of the Tribunal of the Apostolic Signature of Justice; Cardinal-protector of the Kingdom of Portugal
- Agapito Mosca (October 1, 1732) – Cardinal-Deacon of S. Agata in Suburra
- Girolamo Colonna di Sciarra (September 9, 1743) – Cardinal-Deacon of SS. Cosma e Damiano; Camerlengo of the Holy Roman Church; Archpriest of the patriarchal Liberian Basilica
- Prospero Colonna di Sciarra (September 9, 1743) – Cardinal-Deacon of S. Maria ad Martyres; Prefect of the Tribunal of the Apostolic Signature of Grace; Cardinal-protector of the Kingdom of France
- Domenico Orsini d'Aragona (September 9, 1743) – Cardinal-Deacon of S. Nicola in Carcere Tulliano; Cardinal-protector of the Kingdom of Naples
- Gian Francesco Albani (April 10, 1747) – Cardinal-Deacon of S. Cesareo in Palatio; Cardinal-protector of the Kingdom of Poland
- Flavio II Chigi (November 26, 1753) – Cardinal-Deacon of S. Angelo in Pescheria
- Giovanni Francesco Banchieri (November 26, 1753) – Cardinal-Deacon of S. Adriano; Legate in Ferrara
- Luigi Maria Torregiani (November 26, 1753) – Cardinal-Deacon of SS. Vito e Modesto

Thirty five electors were created by Benedict XIV, eight by Clement XII, one by Benedict XIII (Borghese) and Innocent XIII (A. Albani).

=== List of absentees ===
Ten cardinals were entirely absent from this conclave:

- Cardinal d'Alsace (November 29, 1719) – Cardinal-Priest of S. Lorenzo in Lucina; Protopriest of the Sacred College of Cardinals; Archbishop of Mechelen
- Joseph Dominicus von Lamberg (December 20, 1737) – Cardinal-Priest of S. Pietro in Montorio; Bishop of Passau
- John Theodore of Bavaria (September 9, 1743) – Cardinal-Priest of S. Lorenzo in Panisperna; Bishop of Liège; Administrator of Freising and Ratisbon
- Álvaro Eugenio de Mendoza Caamaño y Sotomayor (April 10, 1747) – Cardinal-Priest [no titulus assigned]; Patriarch of the West Indies; Titular Archbishop of Farsalos
- Giovanni Battista Mesmer (April 10, 1747) – Cardinal-Priest of S. Onofrio
- José Manuel d'Atalaia (April 10, 1747) – Cardinal-Priest [no titulus assigned]; Patriarch of Lisbon
- Luis Fernández de Córdoba (December 18, 1754) – Cardinal-Priest [no titulus assigned]; Archbishop of Toledo
- Nicholas de Saulx-Tavannes (April 5, 1756) – Cardinal-Priest [no titulus assigned]; Archbishop of Rouen
- Francisco de Solís Folch de Cardona (April 5, 1756) – Cardinal-Priest [no titulus assigned]; Archbishop of Seville
- Francisco de Saldanha da Gama (April 5, 1756) – Cardinal-Deacon [no deaconry assigned]

All the absentees were created by Benedict XIV; except d'Alsace, who was created by Clement XI; and Lamberg, who was appointed by Clement XII.

== Sources ==
- List of participants of conclave, 1758 by S. Miranda
- Papal Library: biography of Pope Clement XIII
- Ludwig von Pastor History of the Popes vol. XXXVI, London 1941
