= Henry Benedict Stuart =

Catholic cardinal (1725–1807)

His Eminence Henry Benedict Stuart
- Cardinal-Bishop of Ostia and Velletri and Dean of the College of Cardinals
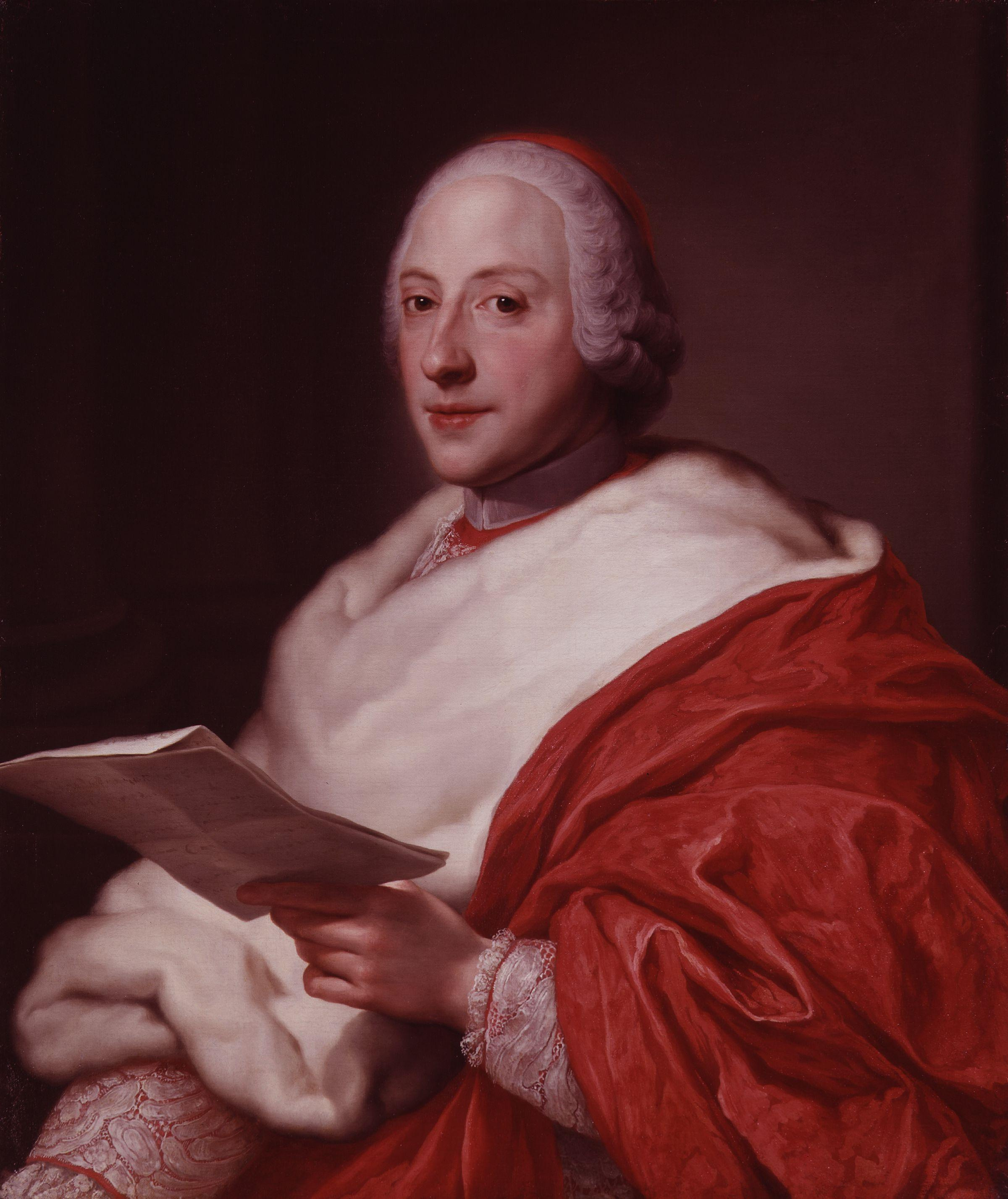
- Portrait by Anton Raphael Mengs, c. 1750
- Province: Rome
- Diocese: Ostia and Velletri
- Appointed: 26 September 1803
- Term ended: 13 July 1807
- Predecessor: Gian Francesco Albani
- Successor: Leonardo Antonelli
- Other posts: Archpriest of Saint Peter's Basilica (1751–1807); Cardinal-Priest of San Lorenzo in Damaso (1763–1807)
- Previous posts: Cardinal-Bishop of Frascati (1761–1803); Cardinal-Priest of Santa Maria in Trastevere (1759–1761); Titular Archbishop of Corinthus (1758–1761); Cardinal-Priest of Santi Apostoli (1752–1761); Cardinal-Priest of Santa Maria in Portico (Campitelli) (1748–1759); Cardinal-Deacon of Santa Maria in Portico (Campitelli) (1747–1748)

Orders
- Ordination: 1 September 1748 by Pope Benedict XIV
- Consecration: 19 November 1758 by Pope Clement XIII
- Created cardinal: 3 July 1747 by Pope Benedict XIV
- Rank: Cardinal-Bishop

Personal details
- Born: Henry Benedict Mary Clement Thomas Francis Xavier Stuart; 6 March 1725 Palazzo Muti, Rome, Papal States
- Died: 13 July 1807 (aged 82) Frascati, Rome, Papal States
- Buried: St. Peter's Basilica, Vatican City
- Parents: James Francis Edward Stuart; Maria Clementina Sobieska
- Signature: Henry Benedict Stuart's signature

- Coat of arms: Henry Benedict Stuart's coat of arms

Jacobite pretender
- Pretendence: 30 January 1788 – 13 July 1807
- Predecessor: "Charles III"

Henry Benedict Thomas Edward Maria Clement Francis Xavier Stuart, Cardinal Duke of York (6 March 1725 – 13 July 1807), also known as the Cardinal of York, was a cardinal, and was the third and final Jacobite heir to publicly claim the thrones of England, Scotland, and Ireland, as the younger grandson of King James VII and II. One of the longest-serving cardinals in history, Henry spent his whole life in the Papal States and became the dean of the College of Cardinals and cardinal-bishop of Ostia and Velletri. Unlike his father James Francis Edward Stuart (The Old Pretender) and elder brother Charles Edward Stuart (The Young Pretender or Bonnie Prince Charlie), Henry made no effort to seize the thrones. After Charles's death in 1788, Henry became known by Jacobites as Henry IX and I, but the Papacy did not recognise Henry as the lawful ruler of England, Scotland, and Ireland and instead referred to him as the "Cardinal Duke of York". He was most widely known as the Duke of York, a title in the Jacobite peerage granted to him by his father.

== Early life ==
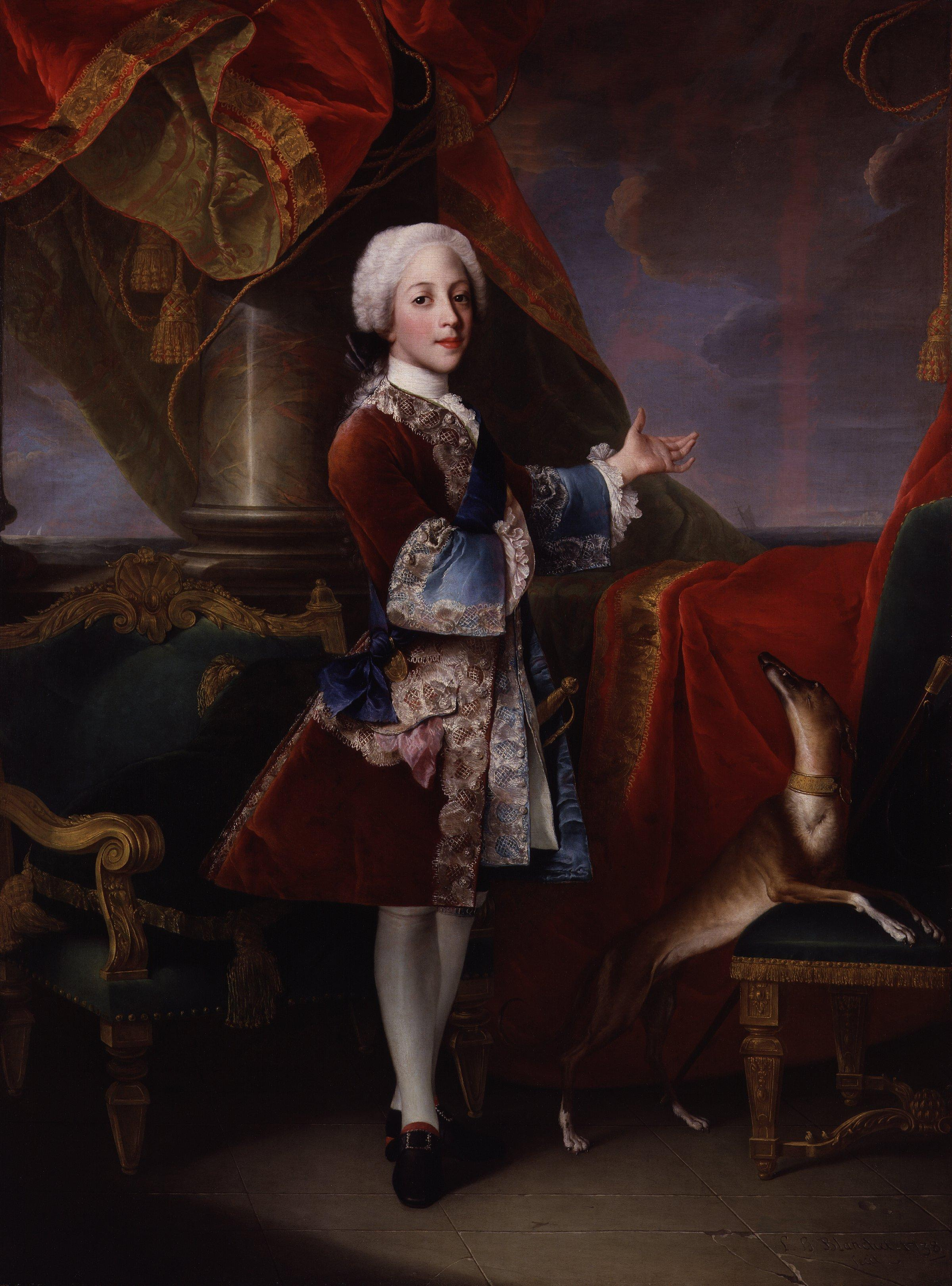
Henry Benedict Stuart, age 13, by Louis Gabriel Blanchet (1738)

Henry was born in exile at the Palazzo Muti in Rome on 6 March 1725 and baptised on the same day by Pope Benedict XIII, 37 years after his grandfather James VII and II lost the thrones, and ten years after his father's failed attempt to regain it. His father was James Francis Edward Stuart, known to his opponents as "the Old Pretender". His mother was the Princess Maria Klementyna Sobieska, granddaughter of the Polish King and Lithuanian Grand-Duke, John III Sobieski. Henry was apparently an intelligent child who could spell and write better than his older brother Charles. More introverted than Charles and more cautious in his approach to problems, Henry was described as pious and mild-mannered.

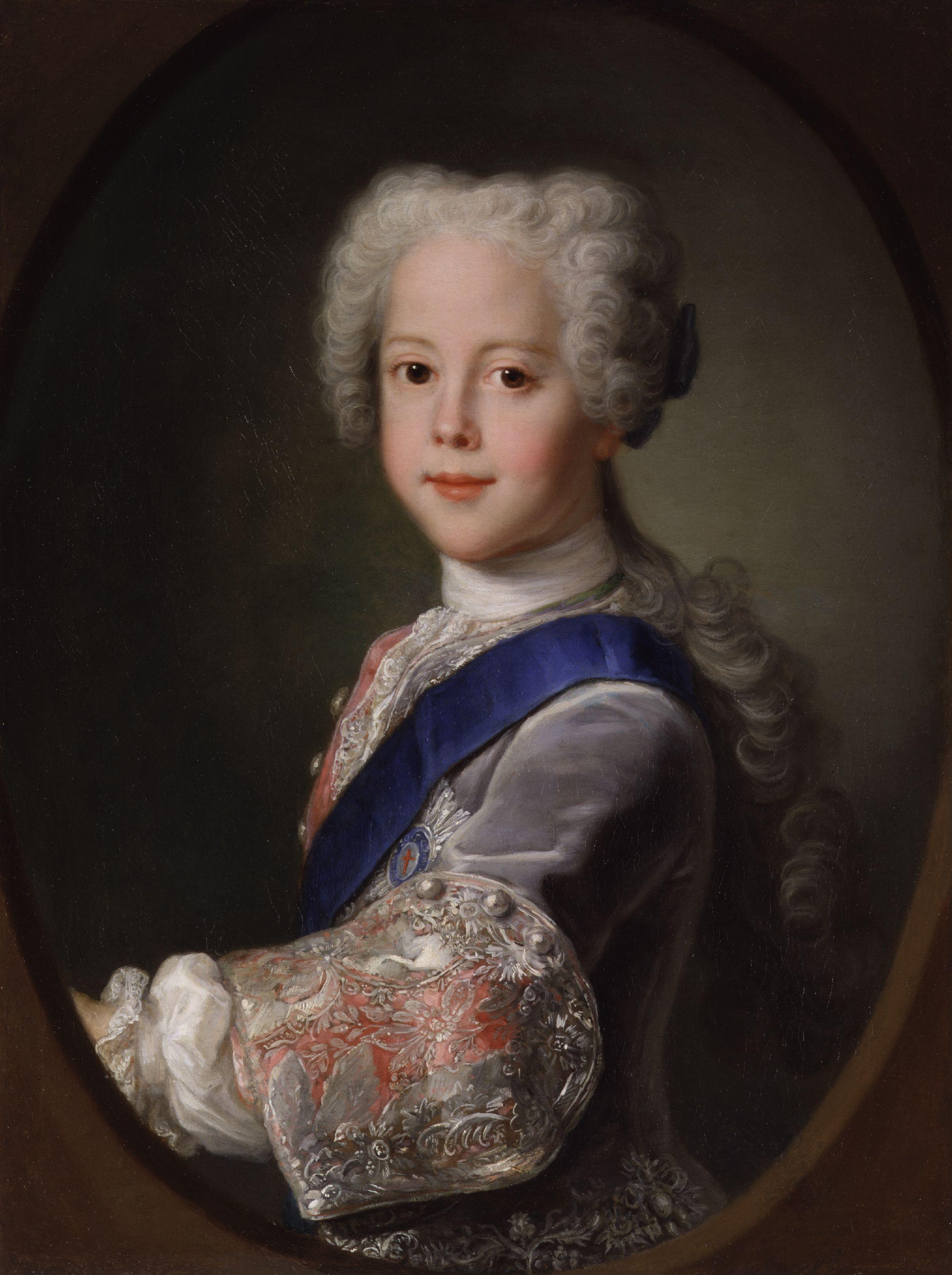
A young Henry Benedict Stuart (painted ca. 1729–1732), bearing a striking resemblance to his elder brother Charles Edward Stuart

Henry went to France in 1745 to help his brother, Prince Charles Edward Stuart ("Bonnie Prince Charlie", or "the Young Pretender") prepare the Jacobite rising of 1745. Attached to the French Royal Army, he was in nominal command of a cross-channel invasion force of some 10,000 men that never made it out of Dunkirk, and subsequently served under Maurice de Saxe at the siege of Antwerp. After the defeat at the Battle of Culloden (1746), Henry Stuart returned to Italy, aged 21.

== Ecclesiastical career ==
On 30 June 1747, Pope Benedict XIV conferred the tonsure on him and created him Cardinal-Deacon of Santa Maria in Campitelli in a special consistory held on 3 July 1747. On 27 August 1747, he was promoted through the four minor orders by Benedict. He received the subdiaconate on 18 August 1748 and diaconate on 25 August 1748. His elder brother Charles, who was in France at the time, was not in favor of the ecclesiastical honors as he believed they would only serve to further religious prejudice against the Stuarts.

As the cardinalate was a rank rather than one of the priestly orders, Charles hoped that Henry might yet make a politically advantageous marriage, and was dismayed to discover that his brother had been ordained a priest on 1 September 1748. Later that month, Henry was made Cardinal-Priest, retaining his diaconal church. In 1751, he was made Arch-Priest of St. Peter's Basilica.

His revenues from the many ecclesiastical preferments he enjoyed were enormous. His income from abbeys and other pluralities in Flanders, Spain, Naples and France amounted to 40,000 Pounds in British money at the time. He also held sinecure benefices yielding revenues in Spanish America. He owned territory in Mexico, which contributed largely to his income.

Louis XV of France bestowed on the Cardinal the abbeys of Auchin and St. Amand as compensation for having had to evict his brother pursuant to the terms of the Treaty of Aix-la-Chapelle.

In December 1752, his titular seat was changed to Santi Apostoli; and in 1758 the Pope named him Camerlengo of the Sacred College of Cardinals. The responsibilities of this office included administering all property, fees, funds and revenue belonging to the College of Cardinals, celebrating the requiem Mass for a deceased cardinal, and charge of the registry of the Acta Consistoralia. He participated in the 1758 papal conclave, which elected Pope Clement XIII. In October of that year, Henry was made titular Archbishop of Corinth. The following year, he resigned the title of Santa Maria in Campitelli to assume that of Santa Maria in Trastevere; however, he retained the Church of Santi Apostoli in commendam.

He was made Cardinal-Bishop of Frascati on 13 July 1761. He was appointed Dean of the Sacred College of Cardinals on 26 September 1803, then also succeeding to the See of Ostia and Velletri. He lived and worked in Frascati for many years, descending each afternoon in his carriage to Rome, where his position as vice-chancellor entitled him to the Palazzo della Cancelleria.

Henry was the last claimant to the British throne to touch the sick to cure them from the King's Evil.

Henry is described as a beatific, abstemious, wealthy, celibate aesthete who lived to a great age, 'inoffensive and respectable' to the end.

== French Revolution and later life ==
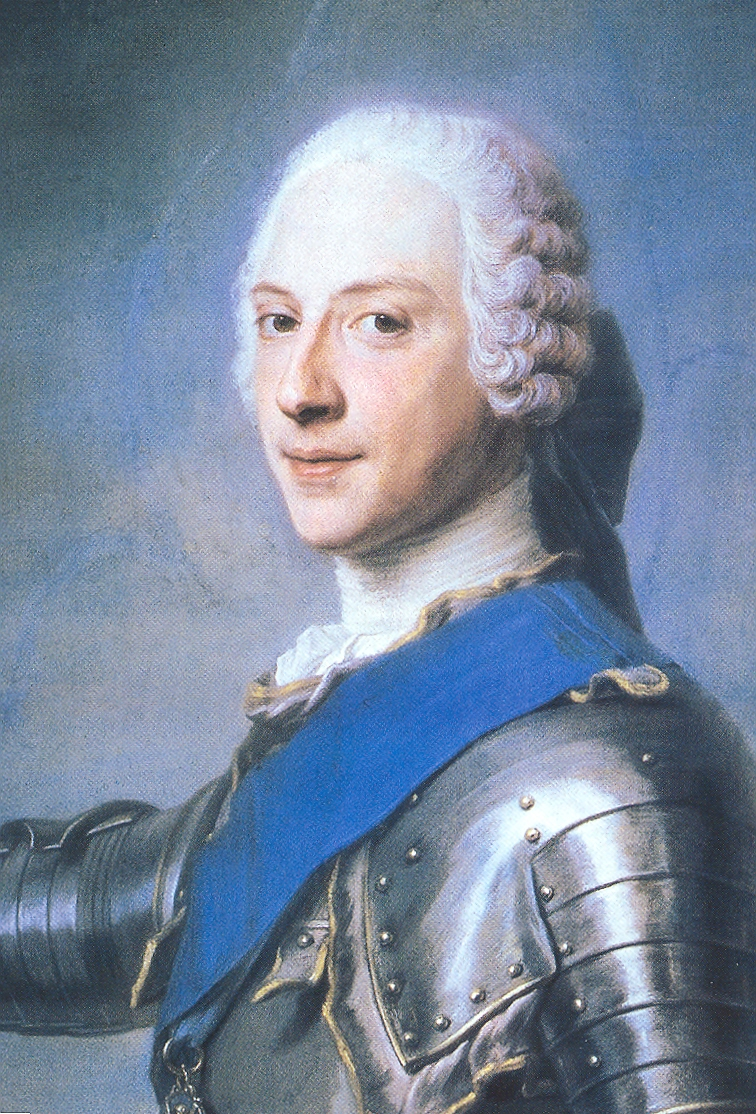
Henry Benedict Stuart by Maurice Quentin de La Tour (1746/47), long thought to be of Charles Edward Stuart

At the time of the French Revolution, he lost his French Royal benefices and sacrificed many other resources to assist Pope Pius VI. This, in addition to the seizure of his Frascati property by the French, caused him to descend into poverty, which resulted in the sale of the Stuart Sapphire. The British Minister in Venice arranged for Henry to receive an annuity of £4,000 from George III of Great Britain. Although the British government represented this as an act of charity, Henry and the Jacobites considered it to be a first instalment on the money which was legally owed to him. (For many years the British government had promised to return the English dowry of his grandmother, Mary of Modena, but never did so.)

The Vatican had recognised James Francis Edward Stuart as James III and VIII as the King of Great Britain and Ireland. After his death in 1766, the Vatican did not recognise his son (Henry's brother) Charles, who had converted to Anglicanism in 1750. The Vatican had not, however, overtly recognised the Hanoverian monarchs. However, in November 1792 the Vatican first referred to George III as the King of Great Britain and Ireland instead of the Elector of Hanover. This resulted in a protest by Henry, who suggested the insult would result in him not visiting Rome again.

Despite their general anti-clericalism and hostility to the Bourbon monarchy, the French Directory suggested to the United Irishmen in 1798 to elevate Henry as King of the Irish (Henry IX). This was in the course of General Jean Joseph Amable Humbert landing a force in County Mayo for the Irish Rebellion of 1798, and trying to rally the Catholic population: a significant number of Irish priests supported the Rising, even though Humbert's army had been veterans of the anti-clerical campaign in Italy. The French hoped Henry could lead a French client state in Ireland; however, Wolfe Tone, the Protestant republican leader, vetoed the scheme. Henry returned to Frascati in 1803. In September of that year he became the Dean of the College of Cardinals and hence Cardinal Bishop of Ostia and Velletri, though he still lived in the episcopal palace at Frascati. He died there on 13 July 1807, aged 82, after 60 years as a cardinal.

== Personal life ==
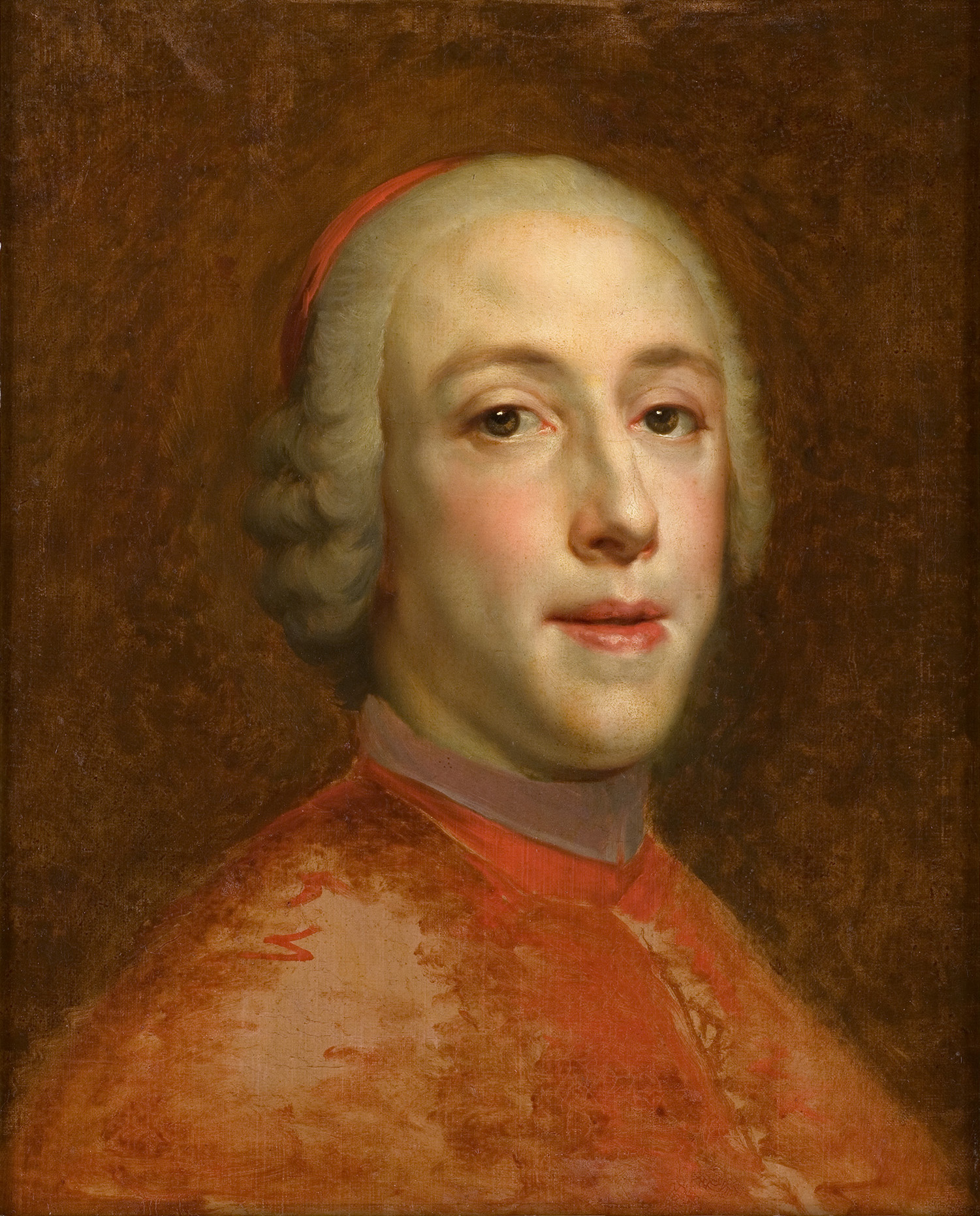
Henry Benedict Stuart by Anton Raphael Mengs (1756)

Some modern historians have speculated whether Henry was homosexual. Contemporary accounts include the writings of Hester Lynch Thrale (1741–1821), and the diplomat and writer Giuseppe Gorani (1740–1819). Gorani admitted to having gathered evidence insufficient to confirm his suspicions either way, but drew attention to the number of handsome clerics that were to be found in Henry's palace. The historian Andrew Lang alluded to James's comment that his younger son would never marry although many marriages had been planned for him.

The writer Gaetano Moroni provides the lengthiest account of Henry's close attachment with his majordomo Giovanni Lercari (1722–1802), whom Henry was said to have "loved beyond measure". This led to serious tensions between the cardinal and his father James, who in 1752 tried to have Lercari dismissed from Rome. Henry reacted by attempting to secure his financial independence, and refused to return to Rome from Bologna without Lercari by his side. A public scandal was narrowly avoided by the intervention of Pope Benedict XIV. It was agreed that Lercari would leave the household, and he was later made Archbishop of Genoa.

Things became easier after the death of James in 1766. From 1769 onwards Henry remained close to Angelo Cesarini, a nobleman from Perugia, who under Henry's protection won various honours, was made canon of the cathedral in Frascati, and in 1801 became Bishop of Milevi. Henry died with Cesarini at his side, as for the past 32 years. Cesarini was later buried in the church of Santa Maria in Vallicella.

These relationships may have had a romantic element.

== Legacy ==
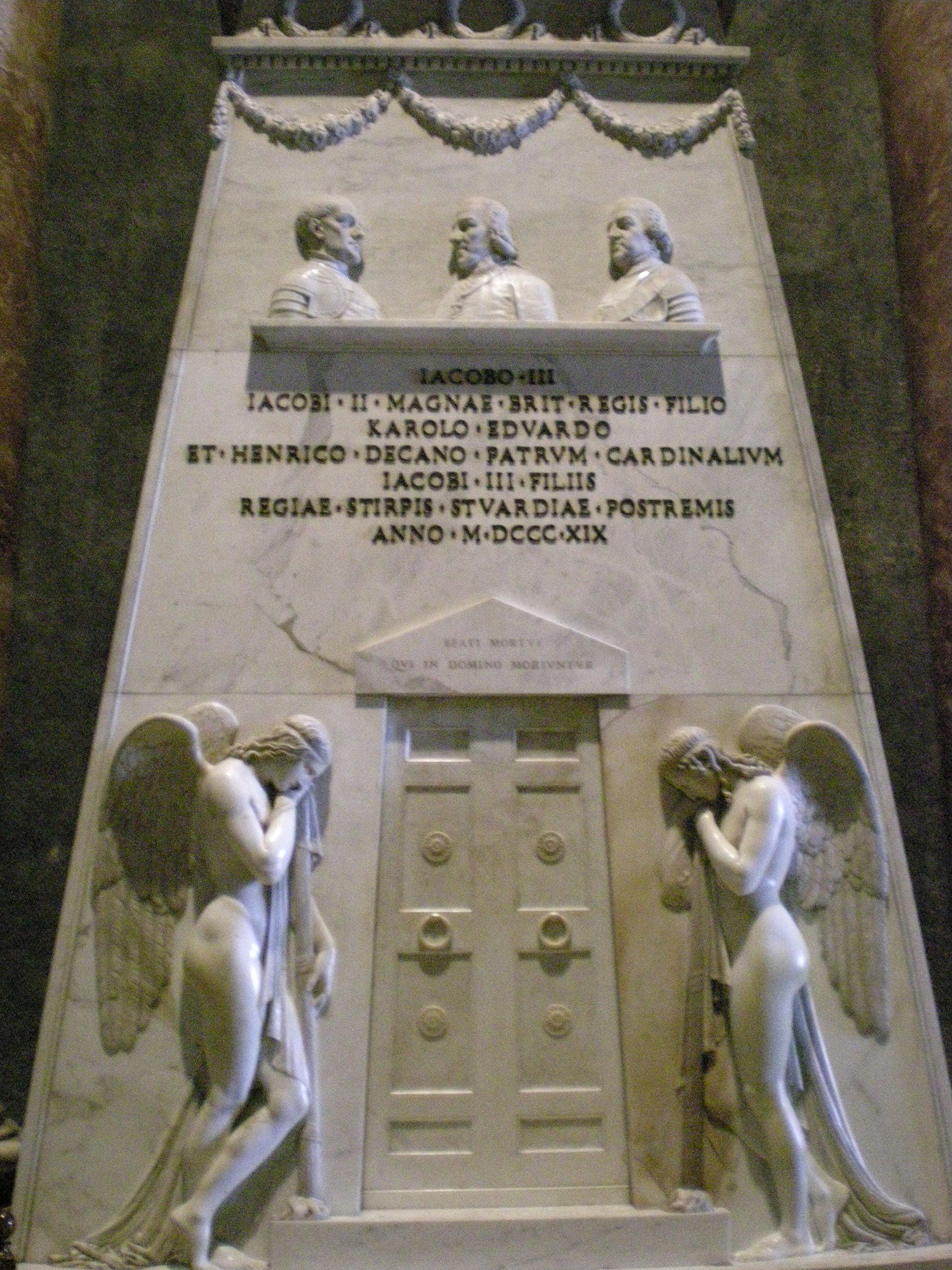
Monument to the Royal Stuarts, left aisle of Saint Peter's Basilica, Rome

Under his will, which he signed as "Henry R" (i.e. Rex or king), he was succeeded in all his claimed British rights by his nearest blood-relative and friend, King Charles Emmanuel IV of Sardinia. Like his successors, Charles Emmanuel neither asserted nor renounced his Jacobite claims.

In his will he left the Crown Jewels of the United Kingdom to the Prince of Wales, the future George IV.

Henry, his brother, his father and his mother are buried in the crypt of St. Peter's Basilica in the Vatican. There is a monument to the Royal Stuarts on one of the columns in the basilica proper, designed by Antonio Canova. The monument was originally commissioned by Angelo Cesarini, executor of Henry Benedict's estate. Among the subscribers was George IV.

The monument was restored at the expense of Queen Elizabeth the Queen Mother in the 1940s.

== Arms ==
During the pretence of his father and brother, Henry claimed a coat of arms consisting of those of the kingdom, differenced by a crescent argent or white crescent.

== See also ==
- Jacobite succession
- Touch pieces

Henry Benedict Stuart House of Stuart Born: 11 March 1725 Died: 13 July 1807
Catholic Church titles
| Preceded by Giacomo Lanfredini | Cardinal-Deacon of Santa Maria in Portico (Campitelli); 31 July 1747 – 16 September 1748 | Succeeded by Flavio Chigi |
| Preceded by Giacomo Lanfredini | Cardinal-Priest of Santa Maria in Portico (Campitelli); 16 September 1748 – 12 February 1759 | Succeeded by Flavio Chigi |
| Preceded by Annibale Albani | Archpriest of St. Peter's Basilica; 8 November 1751 – 13 July 1807 | Succeeded by Romoaldo Braschi-Onesti |
| Preceded by Domenico Riviera | Cardinal-Priest of Santi Apostoli; 18 December 1752 – 13 July 1761 | Succeeded by Giovanni Vincenzo Antonio Ganganelli |
| Preceded by Francesco Mattei | Titular Archbishop of Corinthus; 2 October 1758 – 13 July 1761 | Succeeded by Marco Antonio Colonna |
| Preceded by Giacomo Oddi | Cardinal-Priest of Santa Maria in Trastevere; 12 February 1759 – 13 July 1761 | Succeeded by Fabrizio Serbelloni |
| Preceded by Camillo Paolucci | Cardinal-Bishop of Frascati; 13 July 1761 – 26 September 1803 | Succeeded by Giuseppe Doria Pamphili |
| Preceded by Carlo Rezzonico | Cardinal-Priest of San Lorenzo in Damaso; 24 January 1763 – 13 July 1807 | Succeeded by Francesco Carafa di Trajetto |
| Preceded by Gian Francesco Albani | Cardinal-Bishop of Ostia and Velletri and Dean of the College of Cardinals; 26 September 1803 – 13 July 1807 | Succeeded by Leonardo Antonelli |
Titles in pretence
| Preceded by Charles Edward Stuart as Charles III | — TITULAR — King of England, Scotland, France and Ireland; Jacobite succession 1788–1807; Reason for succession failure: Grandfather deposed in 1688 | Succeeded by Charles Emmanuel IV of Sardinia as Charles IV |
