= Flavio Chigi =

Flavio Chigi is the name of three cardinals:

- Flavio Chigi (1631–1693)
- Flavio Chigi (1711–1771)
- Flavio Chigi (1810–1885)
