= Gesù Divin Salvatore (Rome) =

Church building in Rome, Italy

Church of Jesus the Divine Savior
- Chiesa di Gesù Divin Salvatore
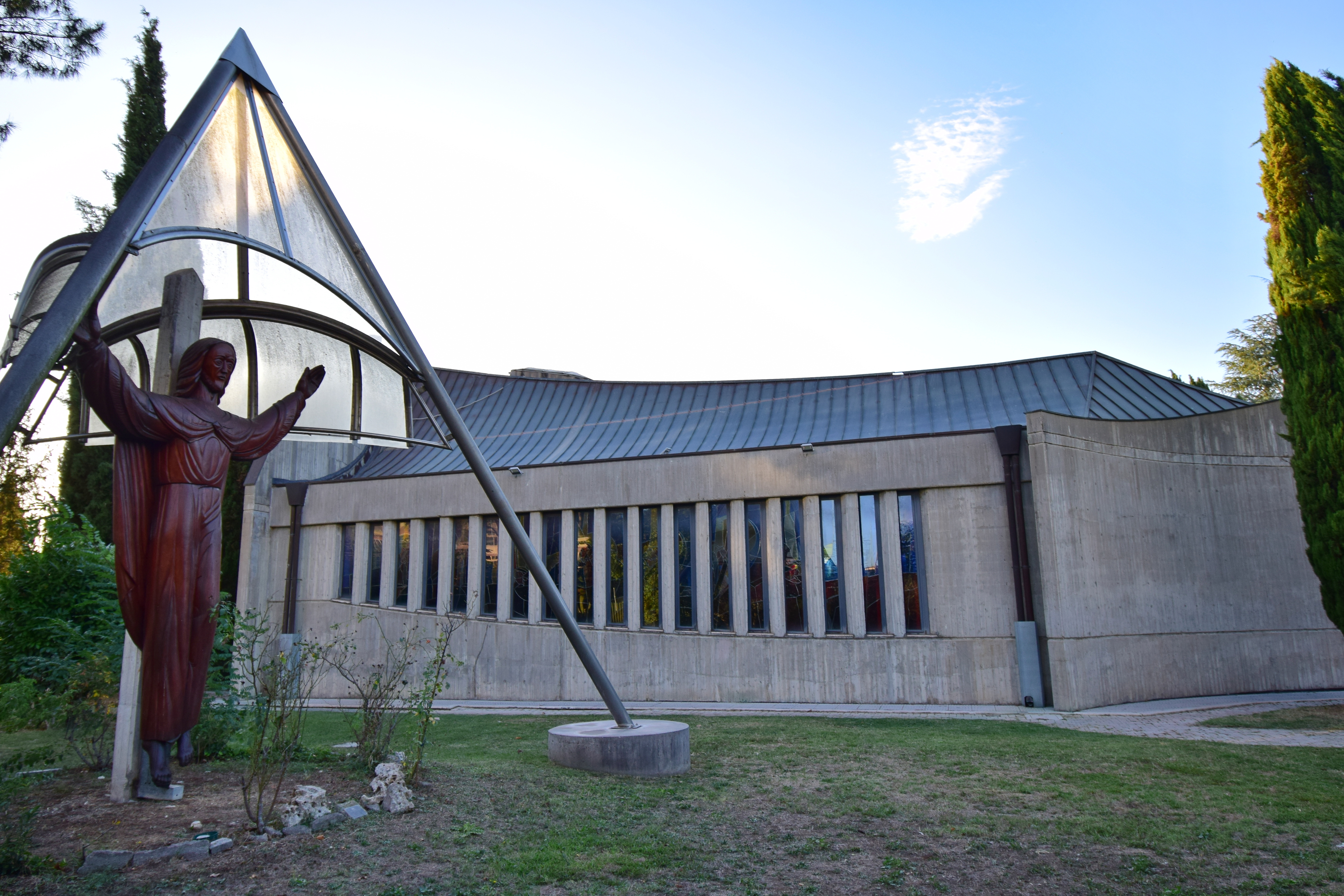

Religion
- Affiliation: Catholic Church
- Province: Rome
- Region: Lazio
- Patron: Jesus the Savior
- Year consecrated: 11 June 1995

Location
- Location: Via Romolo Gigliozzi
- Municipality: Rome
- Country: Italy
- Interactive map of Church of Jesus the Divine Savior

Website
- Website of the parish church.

Gesù Divin Salvatore is a church in Rome (Italy), within the zone Tor de' Cenci, in via Romolo Gigliozzi.

It was built in the first half of the 1990s and was solemnly consecrated by Cardinal Camillo Ruini on 11 June 1995. In November of the same year he received the visit of Pope John Paul II.

The church is home parish, established in 1777 with the name of "Parish Church of Saints Martin and Anthony the Abbot in Castel di Decima" by Cardinal Ludovico Maria Torriggiani, the Secretary of State of Pope Clement XIII. It was located in the private chapel of the castle of Decima (see Sant'Andrea Apostolo in Castel di Decima), whose owners possessed the right of patronage, and until 1924 belonged to the former diocese of Ostia. With the construction of the present seat, the parish changed its name into the current one, and has been entrusted since 1982 to the Salvatorian fathers. Since August 2010, the diocesan priests have taken the place of the Salvatorian fathers.

From an architectural point of view, the peculiarity of the church is its tent shape, with the spire that rises perpendicularly to the main altar.

== Bibliography ==
- C. Rendina, Le Chiese di Roma, Newton & Compton Editori, Milan 2000, p. 120
