= Gian Francesco Albani =

Catholic cardinal (1775–1803)

His Eminence Gian Francesco Albani
- Dean of the College of Cardinals
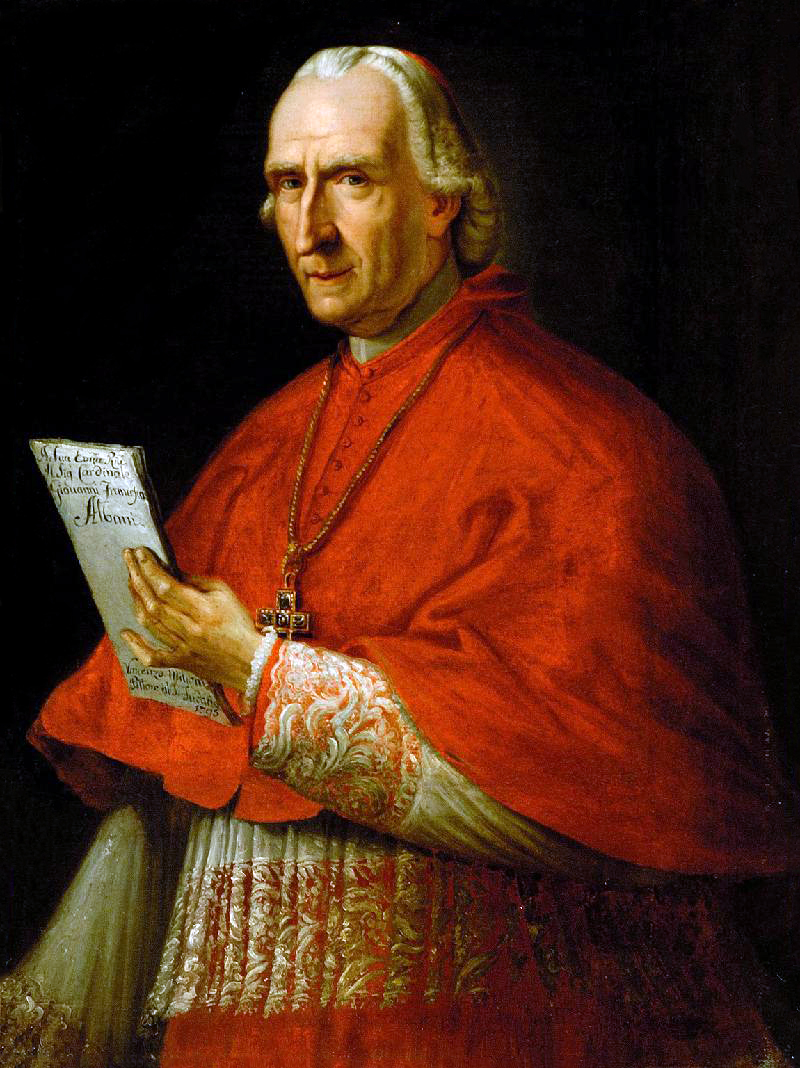
- Church: Roman Catholic
- In office: 1774–1803
- Predecessor: Carlo Alberto Guidoboni Cavalchini
- Successor: Henry Benedict Stuart
- Other posts: Cardinal-Bishop of Ostia (1775–1803)

Orders
- Ordination: 31 March 1748 (deacon); 1759 (priest)
- Consecration: 21 September 1760 by Pope Clement XIII
- Created cardinal: 10 April 1747 by Pope Benedict XIV
- Rank: Cardinal-Bishop

Personal details
- Born: 26 February 1720 Rome, Papal States
- Died: 15 September 1803 (aged 83) Rome, Papal States
- Coat of arms

Gian Francesco Albani (26 February 1720 – 15 September 1803) was a Roman Catholic Cardinal. He was a member of the Albani family.

== Biography ==
Albani was born in Rome, the son of Carlo Albani, Duke of Soriano; his grand-uncle was Pope Clement XI (Gianfrancesco Albani). Furthermore, two of his uncles Annibale Albani and Alessandro Albani were cardinals, and was himself uncle of cardinal Giuseppe Albani (with whom he was, for two years, concurrently cardinal).

In October 1740, he was made Protonotary apostolic, quickly followed by being made the vicar of the patriarchal Basilica di Santa Maria Maggiore in March 1742. Later in the same year, in November, he was made president of the Papal chamber; and also cleric of the Apostolic Chamber less than a year later (September 1743). He further became relator of the S. C. of Indulgences and Sacred Relics in 1743.

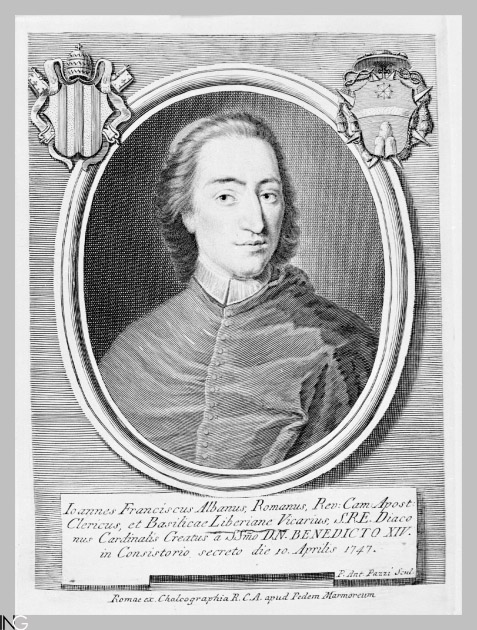
Gian Francesco Albani

On 10 April 1747, he was made cardinal deacon and was given the deaconry of San Cesareo in Palatio on 15 May. He went on to receive the subdiaconate (November 1747) and the diaconate (31 March 1748). He acted as Cardinal Protector of the Kingdom of Poland in the Roman Curia. In 1758, he participated in the Papal conclave.

He went on to the presbyteral order on 12 February 1759 with the titulus of S. Clemente; and the episcopal order on 21 July 1760 as bishop of the suburbicarian see of Sabina. He further opted for the see of Porto e Santa Rufina on 17 March 1773 and having become Dean of the Sacred College of Cardinals, received in addition Ostia and opted for Velletri on 18 December 1775. He further participated in the Papal conclaves of 1769, 1774–1775, and 1799–1800. He was also made archpriest of the patriarchal Liberian basilica and Prefect of the S. C. ceremonial.

His political orientation appeared to be pro-Austrian, anti-French and, with the French invasion of the Papal States in 1798, he absconded to Naples, before moving to Venice where the Papal conclave of 1800 took place. He died in Rome on the 15 September 1803. His funeral was held in the church of Santa Maria in Vallicella, Rome and was buried in the patriarchal Liberian basilica.

Catholic Church titles
Preceded by Giovanni Battista Spinola	Cardinal-Deacon of San Cesareo in Palatio; 15 April 1747 - 12 February 1759	Succeeded by Giovanni Costanzio Caracciolo
Preceded by Cosimo Imperiali	Cardinal-Priest of San Clemente; 1759-1760	Succeeded by Carlo Rezzonico
Preceded by Joaquín Fernàndez de Portocarrero Mendoza	Cardinal-bishop of Sabina; 1760-1773	Succeeded by Carlo Rezzonico
Preceded by Camillo Paolucci	Cardinal-bishop of Porto; 1773–1775	Succeeded by Carlo Rezzonico
Preceded by Fabrizio Serbelloni	Cardinal-bishop of Ostia; 1774–1803	Succeeded by Henry Benedict Maria Clement Stuart
Preceded by Carlo Alberto Guidoboni Cavalchini	Dean of the College of Cardinals; 1774–1803	Succeeded by Henry Benedict Maria Clement Stuart
