= Giovanni Francesco Stoppani =

Italian Cardinal and diplomat

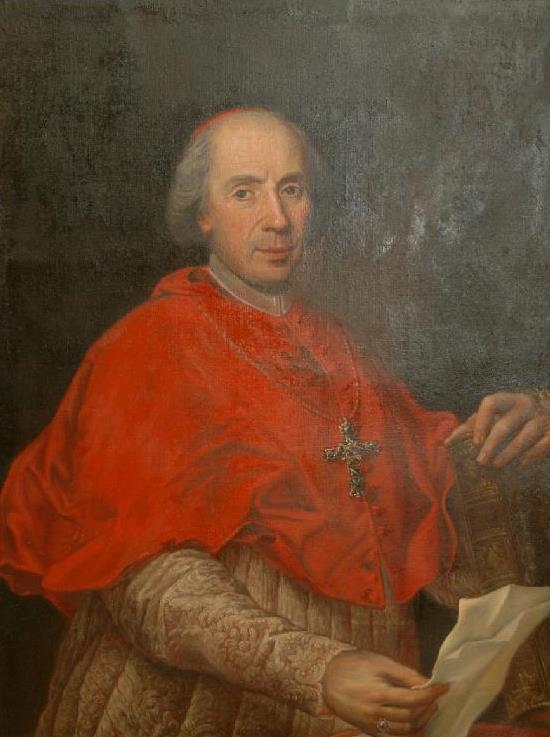
Portrait of Cardinal Giovanni Francesco Stoppani by an unknown artist

Giovanni Francesco Stoppani (Milan, 16 September 1695 – Rome, 18 November 1774) was an Italian Cardinal and diplomat.

== Biography ==
From a noble Milanese family, he was the youngest of the five children of Marquis Giovanni Francesco Stoppani and his wife Laura Croce. He studied at the Collegio Borromeo in Pavia, at the Pontifical Ecclesiastical Academy in Rome and at the University of Pavia, where he graduated as Doctor of both laws.

He entered the church in 1715. He was referendary of the Apostolic Signatura, domestic prelate of Pope Innocent XIII and General inquisitor of Malta from 1730 to 1736.

He was ordained a priest in 1734, and in 1735 he was consecrated Archbishop of Corinth.
he was Apostolic nuncio in Florence (1735-1739), Venice (1739-1743), to the Holy Roman Emperor (1743) and at the Diet of Frankfurt in 1745, that elected Francis I as new Holy Roman Emperor.

He returned to Rome in 1745. Pope Benedict XIV created him Cardinal in the consistory of 26 November 1753. He was Cardinal-priest of San Martino ai Monti (1754-1763) and then Cardinal Bishop of Palestrina (1763-1774). He participated in the 1758 and 1769 papal conclave.

He was legate to Urbino and Romagna, prefect of Economy of the Congregation for the Evangelisation of Peoples and Secretary of the Dicastery for the Doctrine of the Faith (1770-1774).

He died during the 1774–1775 papal conclave, and was buried in the Basilica of Sant'Andrea della Valle.

== Sources ==
- Castiglioni, Carlo (1959). "Il cardinale milanese Gianfrancesco Stoppani." (in Italian) In: Memorie storiche della Diocesi di Milano. Vol. VI (1959), pp. 226-239.

=== External links ===
- David M. Cheney, Giovanni Francesco Stoppani, in Catholic Hierarchy.
- Salvador Miranda, STOPPANI, Giovanni Francesco, on fiu.edu, The Cardinals of the Holy Roman Church, Florida International University.

Catholic Church titles
Preceded by Neri Maria Corsini	Secretary of the Congregation for Universal Inquisition; 1770–1774	Succeeded by Luigi Maria Torregiani
