= Monument to the Royal Stuarts =

Memorial in St. Peter's Basilica in the Vatican City State

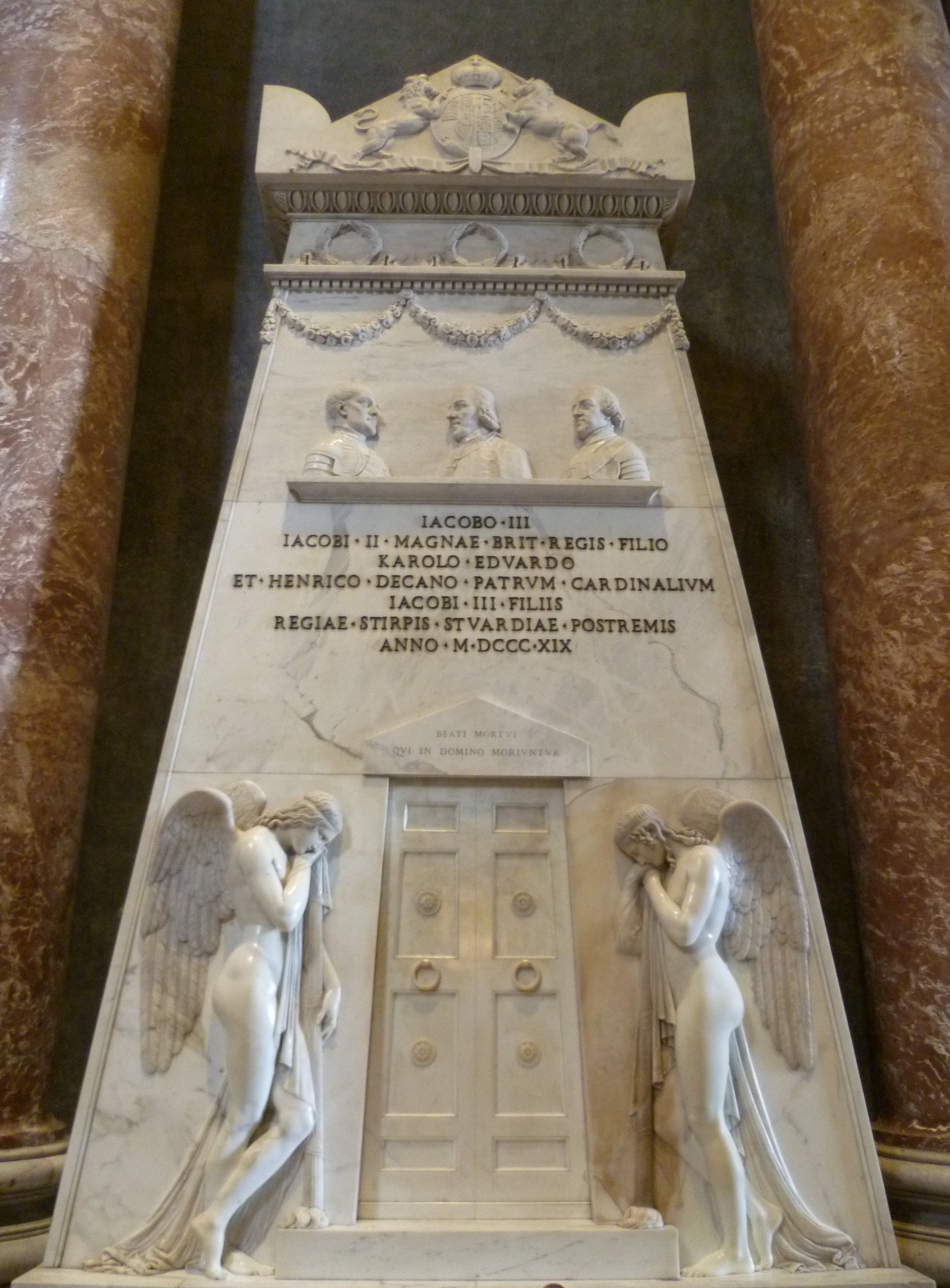
Monument to the Royal Stuarts in St. Peter's Basilica

The Monument to the Royal Stuarts is a memorial in St. Peter's Basilica in the Vatican City State. It commemorates the last three members of the Royal House of Stuart: James Francis Edward Stuart ("the Old Pretender", d. 1766), his elder son Charles Edward Stuart ("the Young Pretender" or "Bonnie Prince Charlie", d. 1788), and his younger son, Henry Benedict Stuart ("the Cardinal Duke of York", d. 1807). The Jacobites recognised these three as kings of England, Scotland and Ireland.

The marble monument is by Antonio Canova (1757–1822), the most celebrated Italian sculptor of his day. It was erected in 1819.

== Description ==
The monument takes the form of a truncated obelisk. It carries bas relief profile portraits of the three exiled princes, and the following inscription:

IACOBO·III
IACOBI·II·MAGNAE·BRIT·REGIS·FILIO
KAROLO·EDVARDO
ET·HENRICO·DECANO·PATRVM·CARDINALIVM
IACOBI·III·FILIIS
REGIAE·STIRPIS·STVARDIAE·POSTREMIS
ANNO·M·DCCC·XIX
("To James III, son of King James II of Great Britain, to Charles Edward and to Henry, Dean of the Cardinal Fathers, sons of James III, the last of the Royal House of Stuart. 1819")

Below the inscription are two weeping angels, symbolising the lost hopes of the exiled Stuarts.

The monument to the Royal Stuarts was originally commissioned by Monsignor Angelo Cesarini, executor of the estate of Henry Benedict Stuart. Among the subscribers was King George IV, who (once the Jacobite threat to his throne had ended with the death of Cardinal Stuart in 1807) was an admirer of the Stuart legend.

The monument stands towards the back of the basilica in the left aisle opposite the door from which people coming down the spiral staircase from the dome and roof exit. It is frequently adorned with flowers by Jacobite romantics.

== Burials ==
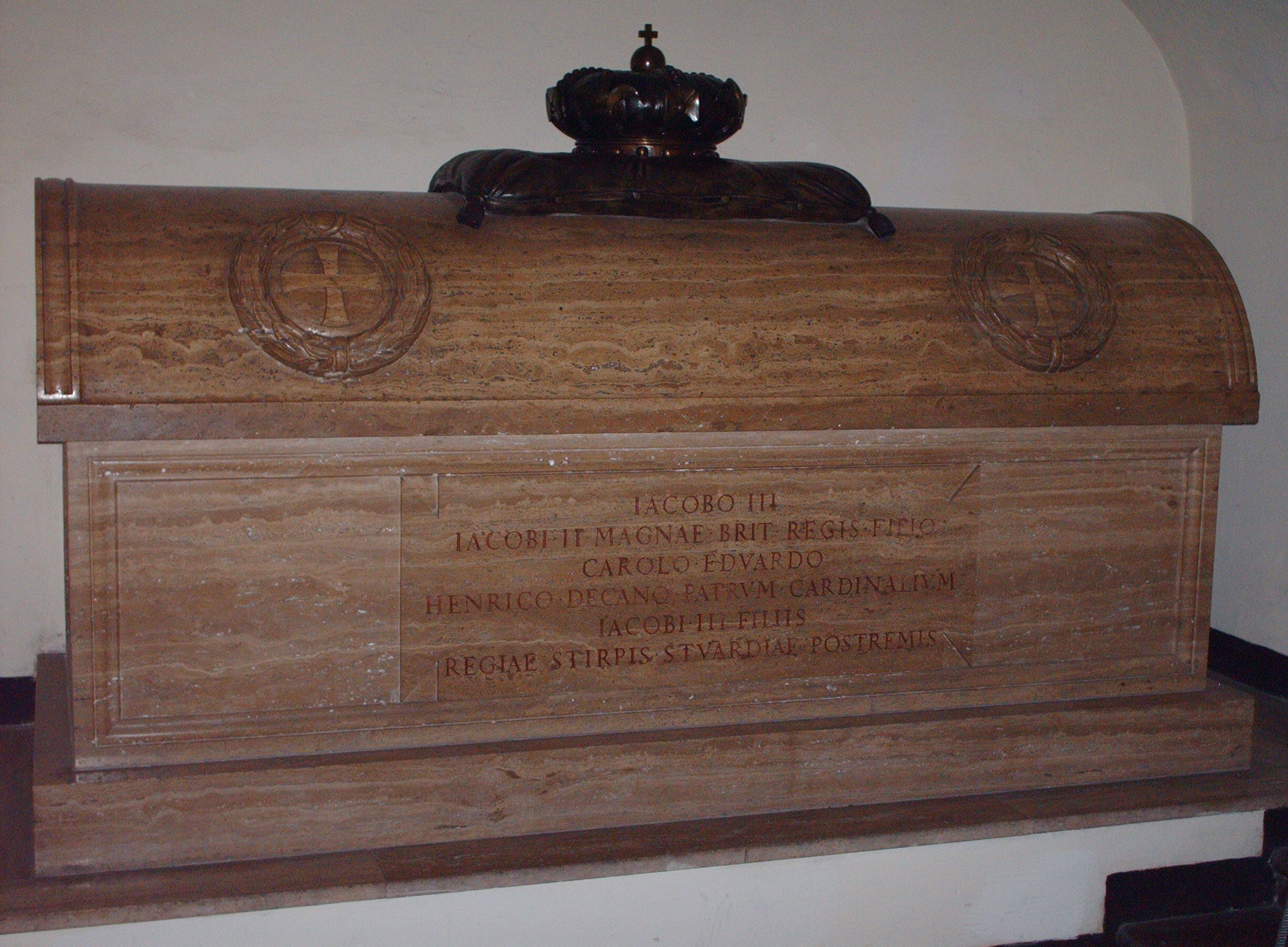
Tomb of James Francis Edward Stuart and his two sons in the crypt below St. Peter's Basilica

The monument is, strictly speaking, a cenotaph, not a tomb. The three Stuarts are buried in the crypt below the basilica. James Francis Edward Stuart was buried here at his death in 1766. When Charles Edward Stuart died in 1788, he was buried in the Basilica of St Peter Apostle in Frascati. When his brother Henry Benedict Stuart died in 1807, both brothers were laid to rest next to their father in the crypt of St. Peter's. Three separate tombstones were erected.

Until 1938 the bodies of the three Stuarts were buried where the tomb of Pius XI now stands. In that year the bodies were moved slightly further east on the left side of the crypt, to make room for Pius's tomb. In 1939 a single sarcophagus was erected over the three graves. On top of the sarcophagus is a bronze pillow on which is placed a bronze crown. On the front of the sarcophagus is the same inscription quoted above. The original tombstones, when they were recognized as Kings (James III, Charles III and Henry IX), are now in the Pontifical Scots College.

== Other monuments ==
Opposite the monument to the Royal Stuarts in St. Peter's Basilica is a monument to Maria Clementina Sobieska, wife of James Francis Edward Stuart and mother of Charles Edward Stuart and Henry Benedict Stuart. Its inscription reads:

MARIA CLEMENTINA M. BRITANN.
FRANC. ET HIBERN. REGINA
("Maria Clementina, Queen of Great Britain, France and Ireland" (Note: The reference to France is a relic of the Plantagenet claim to the French throne. See English Kings of France.))

Queen Christina of Sweden and Queen Charlotte of Cyprus, the only other monarchs with a memorial in the church, also lie entombed in the crypt below the basilica, with the Royal Stuarts. Queen Christina abdicated her throne in 1654 to convert to Catholicism while Queen Charlotte was illegally deposed in 1464 by her illegitimate half-brother.

== See also ==
- Index of Vatican City-related articles
