= Carlo Alberto Guidoboni Cavalchini =

Italian Cardinal

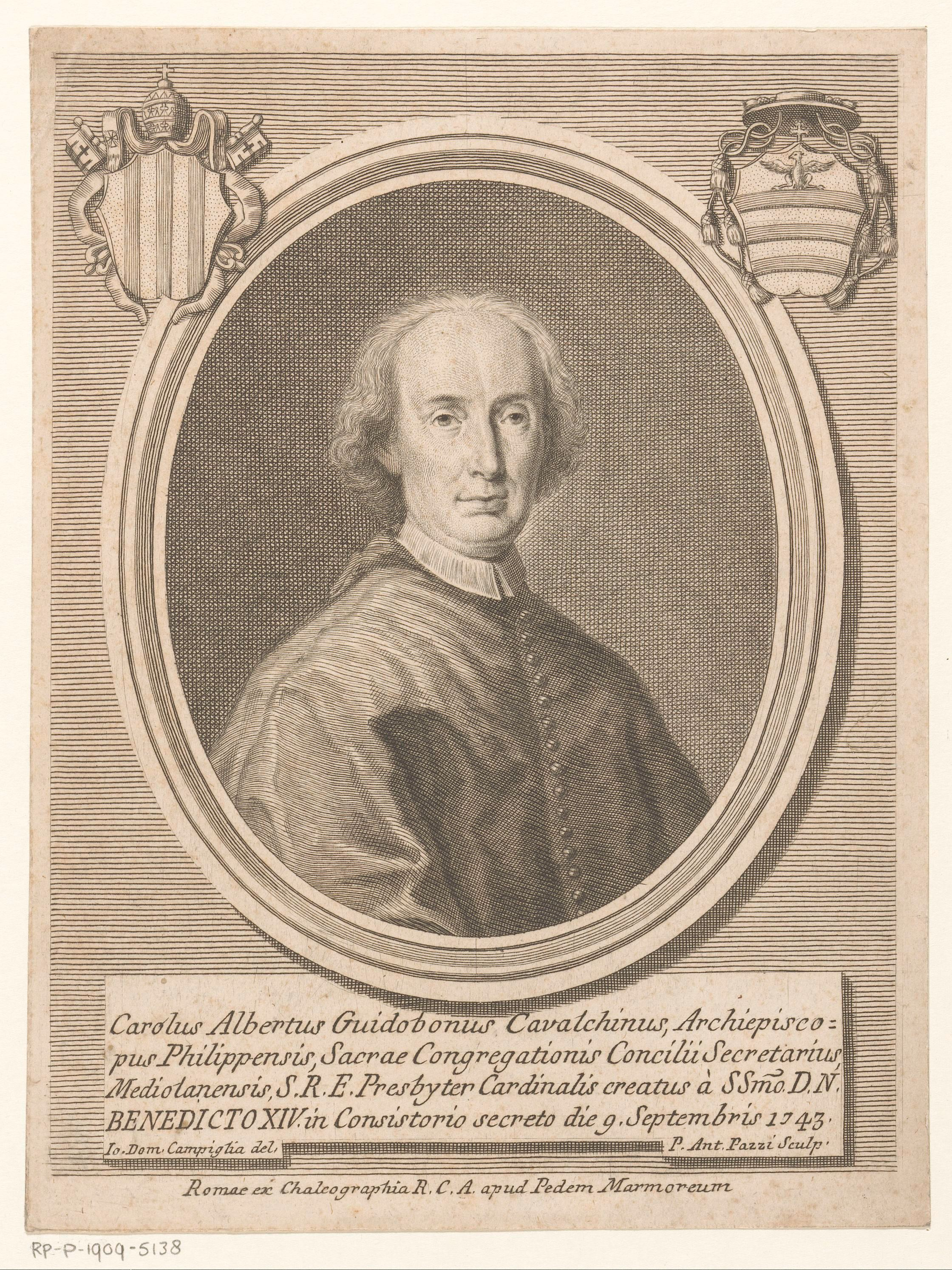

Carlo Alberto Guidoboni Cavalchini (26 July 1683 – 7 March 1774) was an Italian Cardinal. Considered papabile in the Papal conclave, 1758, he was vetoed by Louis XV of France under the jus exclusivae.

A lawyer by education, he became titular archbishop of Filippi in 1728, and was created Cardinal in 1743. He became bishop of Albano in 1759 and bishop of Ostia in 1763. He was the Dean of the College of Cardinals between 1763 to 1774.

Catholic Church titles
| Preceded by Damian Hugo Philipp von Schönborn | Cardinal-Priest of Santa Maria della Pace; 1743–1759 | Succeeded by Antonio Maria Priuli |
| Preceded by Francesco Scipione Borghese | Cardinal-Bishop of Albano; 1759–1763 | Succeeded by Fabrizio Serbelloni |
| Preceded by Giuseppe Spinelli | Bishop of Ostia and Dean of the College of Cardinals; 1763–1774 | Succeeded by Gian Francesco Albani |
Records
| Preceded by Giacomo Oddi | Oldest living Member of the Sacred College; 2 May 1770 - 7 March 1774 | Succeeded by Alessandro Albani |
