= Marcantonio Sabatini =

Marcantonio Sab[b]atini (1637–1724), of a noble family of Bologna, was an antiquary and papal curator to Pope Clement XI and art advisor to Charles VI, a central figure among the cognoscenti in Baroque Rome. Under his supervision the pope's nephew, Alessandro Albani, developed the taste for antiquities for which he is remembered; it was Sabbatini who selected from Albani's collection the antique moss agate carved in high relief with a sleeping tiger that would make a suitable gift to Prince Eugene of Savoy. Among carved gems the "Strozzi Medusa" bearing a signature "Solon" passed through Sabatini's collection. Carved gems in his collection were included among those in Paolo Alessandro Maffei's Gemme antiche (Rome: Domenico de' Rossi), 1708; one of them, a head of Vespasian bears the added inscription LAUR. MED. of Lorenzo de' Medici, which was a habit of Lorenzo's.

A caricature by Pier Leone Ghezzi of Sabbatini and Baron Philipp von Stosch, another renowned antiquary, closely examining engraved gems, is conserved in the Ashmolean Museum. Sabbatini's portrait is in the library of the Università di Bologna.
