= Giuseppe Spinelli (cardinal) =

Italian cardinal

His Eminence Giuseppe Spinelli
- Prefect of the Congregation for the Propagation of the Faith
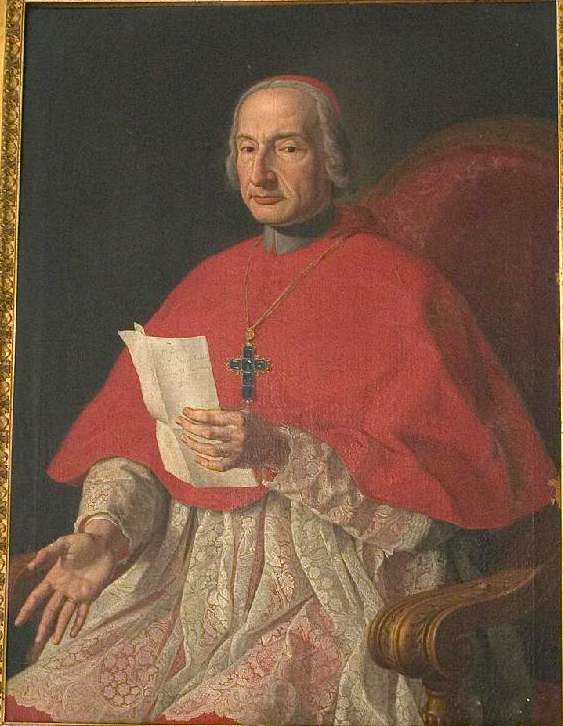
- Church: Roman Catholic Church
- Appointed: 11 September 1756
- Term ended: 12 April 1763
- Other posts: Dean of the College of Cardinals (1761–63); Cardinal-Bishop of Ostia e Velletri (1761–63)
- Previous posts: Archbishop of Naples (1734–54)

Orders
- Ordination: 8 March 1722 (Deacon); 17 April 1724 (Priest)
- Consecration: 28 October 1725 (Bishop) by Thomas de Hénin-Liétard
- Created cardinal: 17 January 1735 by Clement XII
- Rank: Cardinal-Bishop

Personal details
- Born: 1 February 1694 Naples, Kingdom of Naples
- Died: 12 April 1763 (aged 69) Rome, Papal States
- Buried: Santi XII Apostoli, Rome

Giuseppe Spinelli (1 February 1694 – 12 April 1763) was an Italian cardinal. He was Prefect of the Congregation for the Propagation of the Faith

== Biography ==
A native of Naples, he was the son of Giambattista Spinelli, marquis of Fuscaldo, prince of Sant'Arcangelo and duke of Caivano. His mother was Maria Imperiali. He was the grand-nephew of Cardinal Lorenzo Imperiali, cousin of Cardinal Cosimo Imperiali, and uncle of Cardinal Ferdinando Spinelli.

At the age of thirteen, he was sent to Rome to live with his maternal uncle, Cardinal Giuseppe Renato Imperiali, while attending the seminary. In 1717, he was awarded a doctorate in civil and canon law from La Sapienza University.

He was named privy chamberlain of Pope Clement XI, and ordained a priest in 1724. The following year, he was appointed papal nuncio to Flanders and consecrated titular archbishop of Corinthus by Cardinal d'Alsace. He was archbishop of Naples from 1734 until 1754. In this capacity, he conducted a search for the relics of Agrippinus, an early bishop of the city. He found a marble vase with the following words written: "Indeterminate relics that are believed to be the body of Saint Agrippinus." He also summoned Stefano Pozzi to decorate the cathedral at Naples.

His clandestine attempt to introduce the Inquisition to Naples in 1746, resulted in a violent popular uprising, whereupon Charles III forced him to renounce his see and leave the capital. He did so with the greatest of reluctance, attempting first to remedy the situation from Rome, but finally resigned the Archbishopric in early 1754.

In 1756, he became prefect of the Congregation for the Evangelization of Peoples. He later became Bishop of Palestrina in 1753, Bishop of Porto e Santa Rufina in 1759, and Bishop of Ostia in 1761. He belonged to the conservative zelanti faction in the College of Cardinals. He became Dean of the Sacred College in June 1761. He was also Cardinal protector of the Scottish nation from 1753 until his death.

Spinelli died at Rome in 1763.

Catholic Church titles
Preceded by Carlos de Borja y Centellas	Cardinal-Priest of Santa Pudenziana; 14 March 1735 – 25 September 1752	Succeeded by Carlos de Borja y Centellas
Preceded by Francesco Borghese	Cardinal-Priest of Santa Maria in Trastevere; 25 September 1752 – 09 April 1753	Succeeded by Joaquín Fernández Portocarrero
Preceded by Antonio Saverio Gentili	Cardinal-Bishop of Palestrina; 09 April 1753 – 13 July 1759	Succeeded by Federico Marcello Lante
Preceded by Francesco Borghese	Cardinal-Bishop of Porto e Santa Rufina; 13 July 1759 – 13 July 1761	Succeeded by Camillo Paolucci
Preceded by Rainiero d'Elci	Cardinal-Bishop of Ostia; 17 July 1761 – 12 April 1763	Succeeded by Carlo Alberto Guidoboni Cavalchini
Preceded by Rainiero d'Elci	Dean of the College of Cardinals; 17 July 1761 – 12 April 1763	Succeeded by Carlo Alberto Guidoboni Cavalchini
