= Alberico Archinto =

Italian cardinal and papal diplomat

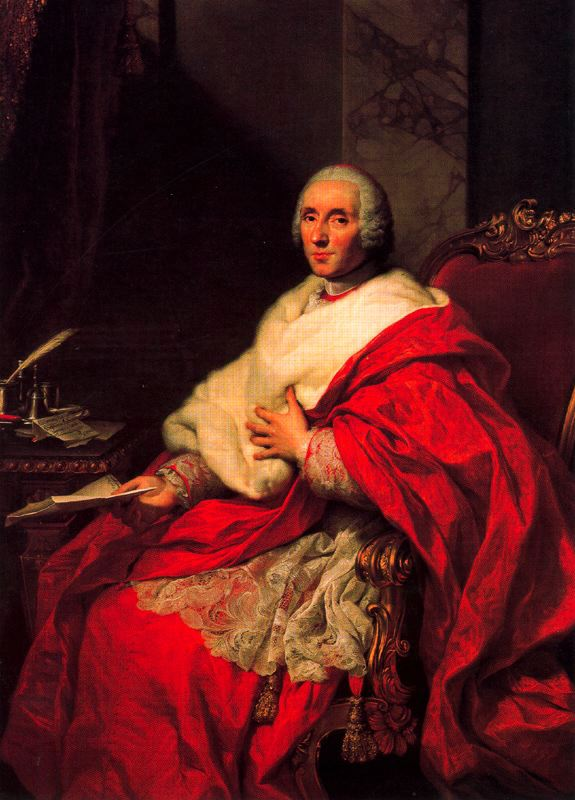
Alberico Archinto

Alberico Archinto (8 November 1698 – 30 September 1758) — was an Italian cardinal and papal diplomat.

== Biography ==
Archinto entered the Roman Curia in 1724. Twelve years later, he was ordained to the priesthood, and on 1 November 1739, he received episcopal consecration as titular archbishop of Nicea. Then, he served as papal nuncio in Grand Duchy of Tuscany (1739–1746) and in Poland (1746–1754). He returned to Rome in 1754 and assumed the posts of governor of Rome and vice-camerlengo of the Church. In 1756, Pope Benedict XIV created him Cardinal and named him Secretary of State and Vice-Chancellor of the Holy Roman Church. He participated in the Papal conclave, 1758; he was considered papabile and received several votes in the early ballots.

He died shortly after the election of Pope Clement XIII, who had confirmed him as Secretary of State and Vice-Chancellor.
