= Prospero Colonna di Sciarra =

Italian cardinal

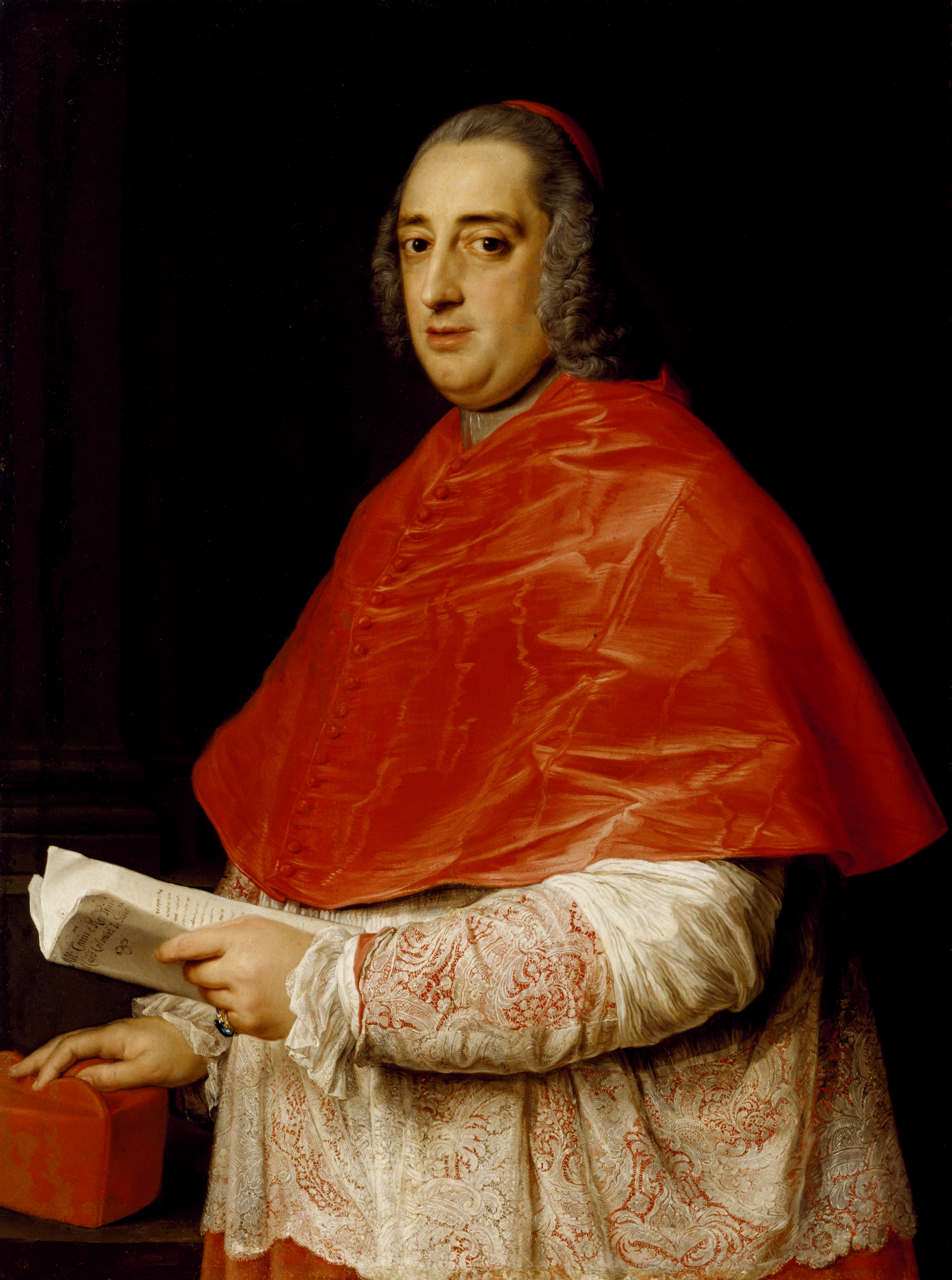
Cardinal Prospero Colonna di Sciarra (Pompeo Girolamo Batoni, ca. 1750, Walters Art Museum, Mount Vernon, Baltimore, Maryland)

Prospero Colonna di Sciarra (17 January 1707 – 20 April 1765) was an Italian cardinal of the family of the dukes of Carbognano. He was the brother of cardinal Girolamo Colonna di Sciarra.

== Biography ==
He was named Cardinal-Deacon in the consistory of 9 September 1743 by Pope Benedict XIV, who granted him dispensation for having a brother in the College of Cardinals and for not having received the minor orders. He was ordained deacon only in 1745. He acted as prefect of the Apostolic Signature of Grace. He participated in the Papal conclave, 1758. During its celebration, he received nomination to the post of Protector of the Kingdom of France (on 9 June 1758). He died in Rome at the age of 58.
