= Giacomo Oddi =

Italian archbishop and cardinal

- Cardinal-Priest of San Lorenzo in Lucina
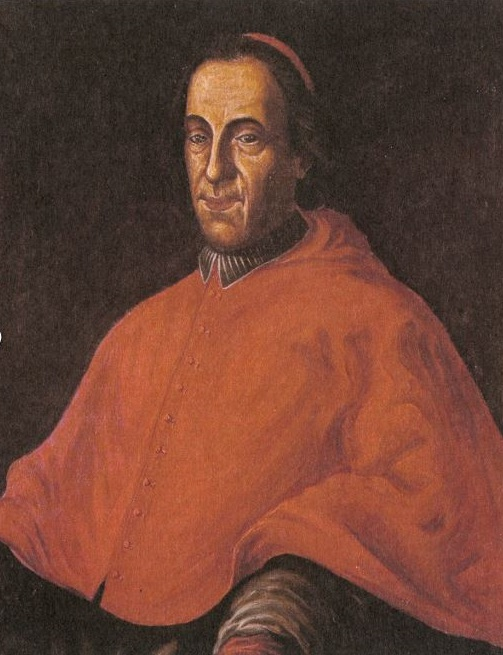
- Church: Catholic Church
- See: San Lorenzo in Lucina
- In office: 21 March 1763 – 2 May 1770
- Predecessor: Johann Theodor of Bavaria
- Successor: Giuseppe Pozzobonelli
- Other post: Bishop of Viterbo e Tuscania (1749-1770)
- Previous posts: Cardinal-Priest of Santa Prassede (1759-1763); Cardinal-Priest of Santa Maria in Trastevere (1758-1759); Cardinal-Priest of Sant'Anastasia (1756-1758); Cardinal-Priest of San Girolamo dei Croati (1745-1756); Titular Bishop of Laodicea in Phrygia (1732-1745); Apostolic Nuncio to Portugal (1739-1744); Apostolic Nuncio to Venice (1735-1739); Apostolic Nuncio to Germany (1732-1735)

Orders
- Ordination: 30 May 1723
- Consecration: 24 June 1732 by Giorgio Spinola
- Created cardinal: 9 September 1743 by Pope Benedict XIV

Personal details
- Born: 11 November 1679 Perugia, Papal States
- Died: 2 May 1770 (aged 90) Viterbo, Papal States

Giacomo Oddi (11 November 1679 - 2 May 1770) was an Italian archbishop and cardinal.

== Biography ==
He was born to a local aristocratic family in Perugia and was ordained a priest on 30 May 1723. He was appointed titular archbishop of Laodicea in Phrygia, and was consecrated a bishop on 24 June 1732.

On 9 September 1743, he was made a cardinal by pope Benedict XIV, who gave him the titulus of San Girolamo dei Croati on 5 April 1745. He later took part in the 1758 conclave.

On 22 September 1749, he was made archbishop ad personam of Viterbo and Tuscany, an office he held until his death. On 12 January 1756, he was given the titulus of Sant'Anastasia, which he exchanged on 22 November 1758 for that of Santa Maria in Trastevere and on 12 February 1759 for that of Santa Prassede. He finally settled on the titulus of San Lorenzo in Lucina on 21 March 1761 and served as protopresbyterian cardinal from 1763 until his death in Viterbo in 1770. He was buried in Viterbo Cathedral.

Records
Preceded by Rainiero d'Elci	Oldest living Member of the Sacred College; 22 June 1761 - 2 May 1770	Succeeded by Carlo Alberto Guidobono Cavalchini
