= Alessandro Albani =

Roman Catholic cardinal and antiquarian (1692–1779)

His Eminence Alessandro Albani
- Cardinal-Deacon of Santa Maria in Via Lata
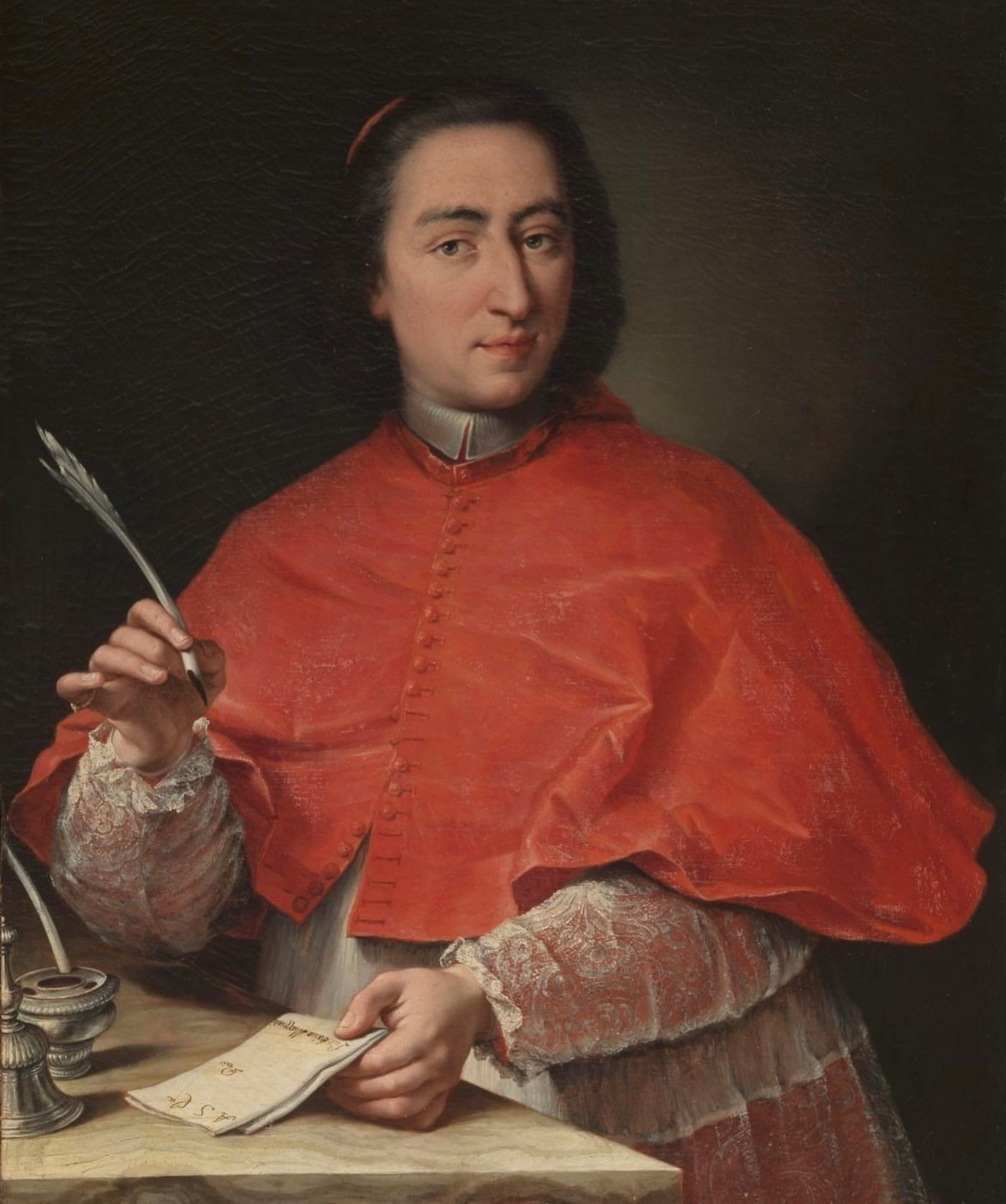
- Portrait by Ludovico Mazzanti, 1722
- Church: Catholic Church
- Appointed: 10 April 1747
- Term ended: 11 December 1779
- Predecessor: Carlo Maria Marini
- Successor: Domenico Orsini d'Aragona

Orders
- Created cardinal: 16 July 1721 by Pope Innocent XIII
- Rank: Cardinal-Deacon

Personal details
- Born: 15 October 1692 Urbino, Papal States
- Died: 11 December 1779 (aged 87) Rome, Papal States

Alessandro Albani (15 October 1692 – 11 December 1779) was a Roman Catholic cardinal remembered as a leading collector of antiquities, dealer and art patron in Rome. He supported the art historian, Johann Joachim Winckelmann and commissioned paintings from Anton Raphael Mengs. As a cardinal (from 1721) he furthered the interests of the governments of Austria, Savoy and Britain against those of France and Spain; he was a noted jurist and papal administrator in his earlier career. Upon his death he was the last cardinal created by Pope Innocent XIII.

== Biography ==
Alessandro Albani was born on 15 October 1692 in Urbino, then part of the Papal States. He was the son of Orazio Albani. His studied jurisprudence at the La Sapienza University in Rome. Early in life he also prepared for a military career. At the age of 9 years, on 26 August 1701, he was made an honorary member of the military brotherhood of justice of the Knights of St John of Rome, and in 1707, a colonel of a regiment of dragoons in the pontifical military.

Alessandro was a member of the Albani family (branch of Urbino), which originated from into the Albani (family) that had established itself there from northern Albania in the 15th century. Alessandro's father, Orazio, was the brother of Pope Clement XI Albani, who convinced Alessandro to set aside his budding military career. In part, his weak eyesight, that led to blindness in his advanced age, was not propitious for a soldier, and hence Alessandro entered the clergy. After Pope Clement XI's death in March 1721, Pope Innocent XIII appointed Alessandro as a cardinal, on 16 July 1721 as Cardinal-Deacon of Sant’Adriano al Foro - for which Alessandro required numerous special dispensations, not least because his brother, Annibale Albani, had been made a cardinal in 1711 and still sat in the Sacred College.

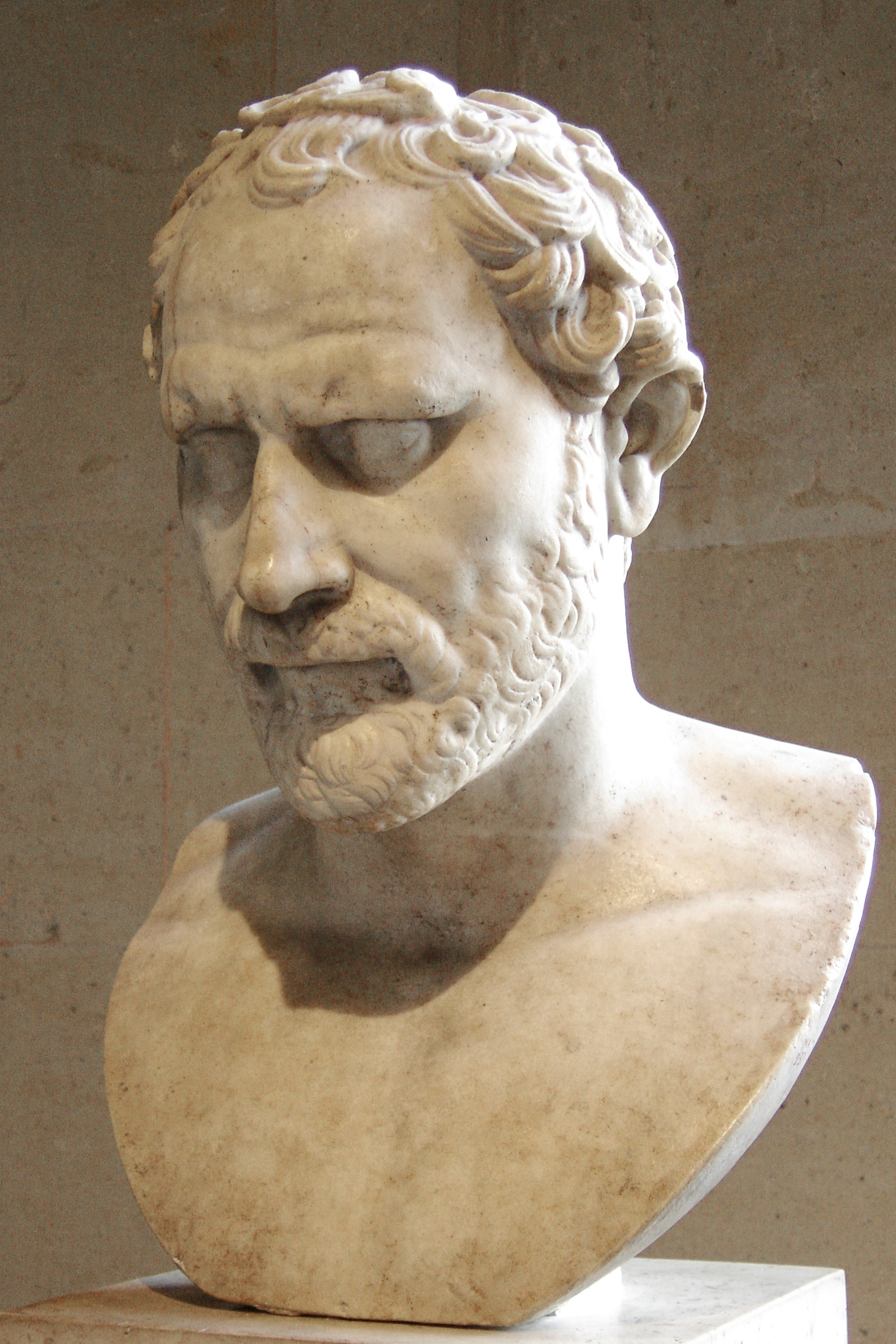
Bust of Demosthenes from Alessandro Albani's collection (Musée du Louvre).

Albani developed into one of the most astute antiquarians of his day, an arbiter of taste in the appreciation of Roman sculpture, and "a powerful and enterprising collector of Roman antiquities and patron of the arts... He used both ancient and modern art as a form of cultural capital," Seymour Howard observed, "giving away acquisitions as favours and selling them for perpetually needed funds or when they lost efficacy for him." His first apprenticeship in this area was served under the papal antiquary and curator Marcantonio Sabatini.

He was the formal protector of Rome's artists as patron of the Accademia di San Luca and was a powerful advocate for his favourites. Among the works of modern artists that passed through his hands was the album of drawings by Carlo Maratti that was sold in 1763 to George III and is conserved in the Royal Collection.

His worldly manner and his sympathy with the Hanoverian party in Britain- (Clement kept the Stuart pretender as his perennial guest in Rome) was exemplified by his friendship with Baron Philipp von Stosch, who shared many of Alessandro Albani's interests, and his correspondence with Sir Horace Mann, the British envoy at Florence, who caused Clement many occasions of concern. Named papal envoy, with his brother Cardinal Carlo, to Bologna to welcome King Frederick IV of Denmark, he was sent in 1720 to Vienna in an attempt to retain Papal territorial rights in the duchy of Parma and Piacenza, recently awarded to Charles de Bourbon, and to conclude the negotiations for the restitution of Comacchio, in the possession of Habsburg troops since 1707. Sir Horace Mann, a close correspondent with Horace Walpole in England at the request of the Cardinal, arranged for John Chute of 'The Vyne' in Hampshire, who was enjoying the Grand Tour, to spy on the Jacobites, who were in Rome making their plans for an invasion of England from Scotland. Information he collected was passed to Albani and then sent to England.

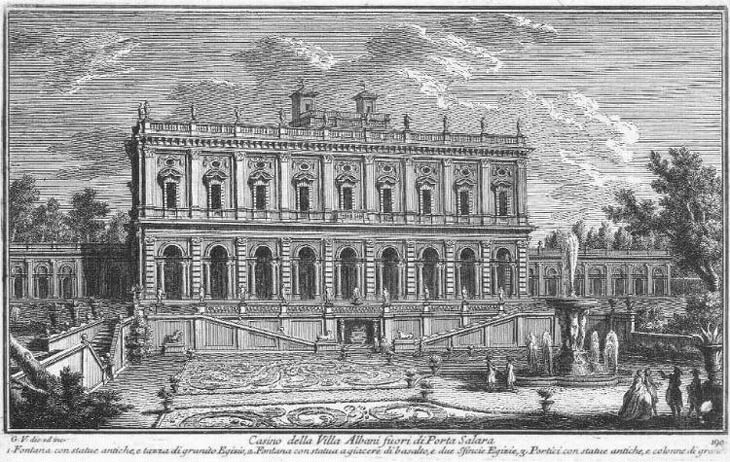
A mid-18th-century view of the Villa Albani by Giuseppe Vasi.

Albani's accommodating manner suited him for diplomatic tasks, such as the successful negotiations with Vittorio Amedeo II over conflicting rights of nomination and investiture, aggravated by the acquisition by the House of Savoy of Sardinia, to which the papacy had long-standing feudal pretensions. Accords were finalised in 1727 during the pontificate of Pope Benedict XIII, for which Vittorio Amedeo expressed his gratitude to Cardinal Alessandro with a rich abbacy and the title of "Protector of the Kingdom". Within the Papal Curia, however, the party of the zelanti considered the terms of the accords too generous. Tensions increased with the accession of Pope Clement XII, who was unsympathetic to Savoy. When a new concordat was arrived at in 1741, Alessandro Albani signed on the part of Savoy.

As a cardinal, Albani participated in the conclaves of 1724, 1730, 1740, 1758, 1769, and 1774-1775. He announced the elections of Pope Clement XIII (1758), Pope Clement XIV (1769) and Pope Pius VI (1775). His consistent stand against French interests brought him closer to those of the Hapsburgs; he represented Hapsburg Austria at the Holy See, from 1756 until his death. On 12 August 1761, he was appointed Librarian of Holy Roman Church.

During the papacy of Pope Clement XIV, Albani realigned himself with the zelanti against the interference of Catholic monarchs in the diplomacy that surrounded the eventual expulsion and Suppression of the Jesuits from most Catholic countries.

He died on 11 December 1779 and was buried in the Observant Franciscan Church of San Pietro in Urbino, Marche.

== Villa Albani ==
Alessandro commissioned in 1745 the construction of the prominent Villa Albani in Rome. Building began in 1751 according to Giuseppe Vasi and celebrated as complete in 1763, to house his evolving, constantly replaced and renewed collections of antiquities and ancient Roman sculpture, which soon filled the casino that faced the Villa down a series of formal parterres. Albani's lifelong friend Carlo Marchionni was the architect in charge, at the Villa and perhaps also for the two temples in the park, an Ionic temple of Diana and a sham ruin. The Albani antiquities were catalogued by the Cardinal's secretary, the first professional art historian, Johann Joachim Winckelmann, who was supported by Albani from the time when the Seven Years' War stranded him in Rome without his pension, and whose own connoisseurship was sharpened by the connection.

After the Napoleonic upheavals, the Albani heirs sold the villa to the Chigi, who were themselves related to the Albani and by this time had added the Albani name to their own. The Chigi eventually sold it to the Torlonia, the Roman bankers, to whom the villa still belongs. Cardinal Albani's coins and medals went to the Vatican Library, over which he had presided from 1761. The sarcophagi, columns and sculptures have been dispersed, but the famous bas-relief of Antinous remains in the villa.

Cardinal Alessandro Albani had another villa and park at Porto d'Anzio, that was finished in February 1732, but was habitable for a few weeks only in spring because of malaria. Perhaps the villa and a casina in the park were by Marchionni. Excavations in the park brought to light many ancient Roman sculptures.

== See also ==
- Albani (disambiguation)

Records
Preceded by Carlo Alberto Guidoboni Cavalchini	Oldest living Member of the Sacred College; 7 March 1774 - 11 December 1779	Succeeded by Ludovico Calini
