= Fabrizio Serbelloni =

Italian diplomat and Cardinal

His Eminence Fabrizio Serbelloni
- Cardinal, Bishop of Ostia
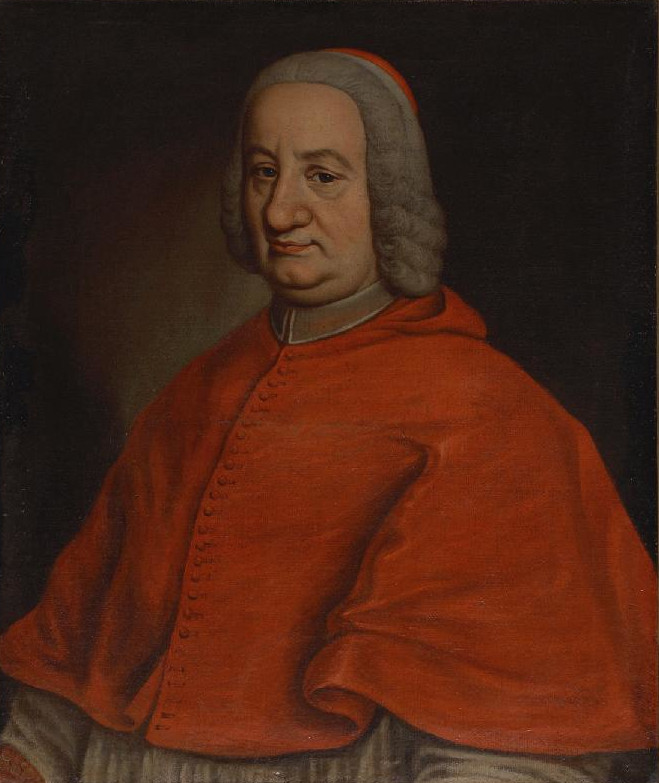
- Church: Catholic Church
- See: Ostia
- Appointed: 18 April 1774
- Term ended: 7 December 1775
- Predecessor: Carlo Alberto Guidoboni Cavalchini
- Successor: Gian Francesco Albani
- Other posts: Archbishop of Patras; Apostolic Nuncio to Florence; Apostolic Nuncio to Cologne; Apostolic Nuncio to Poland; Apostolic Nuncio to the Emperor

Orders
- Consecration: 25 Aug 1731 (Bishop) by Vincenzo Muscettola
- Created cardinal: 26 November 1753 by Pope Benedict XIV

Personal details
- Born: 4 November 1695 Milan, Duchy of Milan
- Died: 7 December 1775 (aged 80) Rome, Papal States
- Buried: San Carlo al Corso, Roma

Fabrizio Serbelloni (Sorbelloni) (1695–1775) was an Italian diplomat and Cardinal.

== Life ==
Fabrizio Serbelloni was born on 4 November 1695 in Milan to a noble and prominent family. He studied initially in Rome at the Collegio Clementino, and on 18 March 1714 he received in Milan the tonsure, becoming a cleric. He followed his studies at the University of Pavia, and he graduated in utroque iure on 19 July 1718.

On 27 August 1721, he was made Referendary of the Tribunals of the Apostolic Signature of Justice and of Grace and he started his rapid career in the administration of the Papal States with the appointment as vice-legato (i.e. vice-governor) of Ferrara from 1722 to 1725. Then he served as inquisitor general in Malta from 7 May 1726 until 1730: his ministry in Malta ended after a clash with some young knights of Malta who threw him in the ditch of the old city. On 17 October 1730, he became governor of Loreto.

In 1731, he started his diplomatic career with the appointment on 12 December to the Nunciature to Florence. In preparation to this task, he was elected titular archbishop of Patras on 6 August 1731, when he was still in Loreto. His episcopal consecration followed on 25 August in the Basilica della Santa Casa at the hands of Vincenzo Antonio Maria Muscettola bishop of Recanati e Loreto.

On 18 March 1735, he was appointed Apostolic Nuncio to Cologne, followed by the Nunciature to Poland starting from 28 July 1738. His last diplomatic post was the appointment as Nuncio to the Emperor in Vienna which he kept for about eight years, from 5 March 1746 to 4 June 1754. During his office in Vienna, he did not succeed in protecting the interests of the Papacy in relation to some disputed feuds.

On 26 November 1653, he was promoted to Cardinal priest with the title of Santo Stefano al Monte Celio, which on 21 March 1763, he modified to the title of Santa Maria in Trastevere. He returned to his career as officer of the Papal States being appointed legate (i.e. governor) of Bologna on 16 September 1754, a position he maintained till October 1761.

He became Cardinal Bishop of Albano on 16 May 1763, and Cardinal Bishop of Ostia on 18 April 1774. (Note: Although the see of Ostia is customary assigned to the dean of the College of Cardinals, the dean at that time was Gian Francesco Albani, bishop of Porto e S. Rufina) He died in Rome on 7 December 1775, and he was buried in the church of San Carlo al Corso in front of the main altar.

== Notes ==
Catholic Church titles
Preceded by Carlo Alberto Guidoboni Cavalchini	Cardinal-bishop of Albano; 1763-1774	Succeeded by François-Joachim de Pierre de Bernis
Preceded by Carlo Alberto Guidoboni Cavalchini	Cardinal-bishop of Ostia; 1774-1775	Succeeded by Gian Francesco Albani
