= Luigi Maria Torregiani =

Italian cardinal (1697–1777)

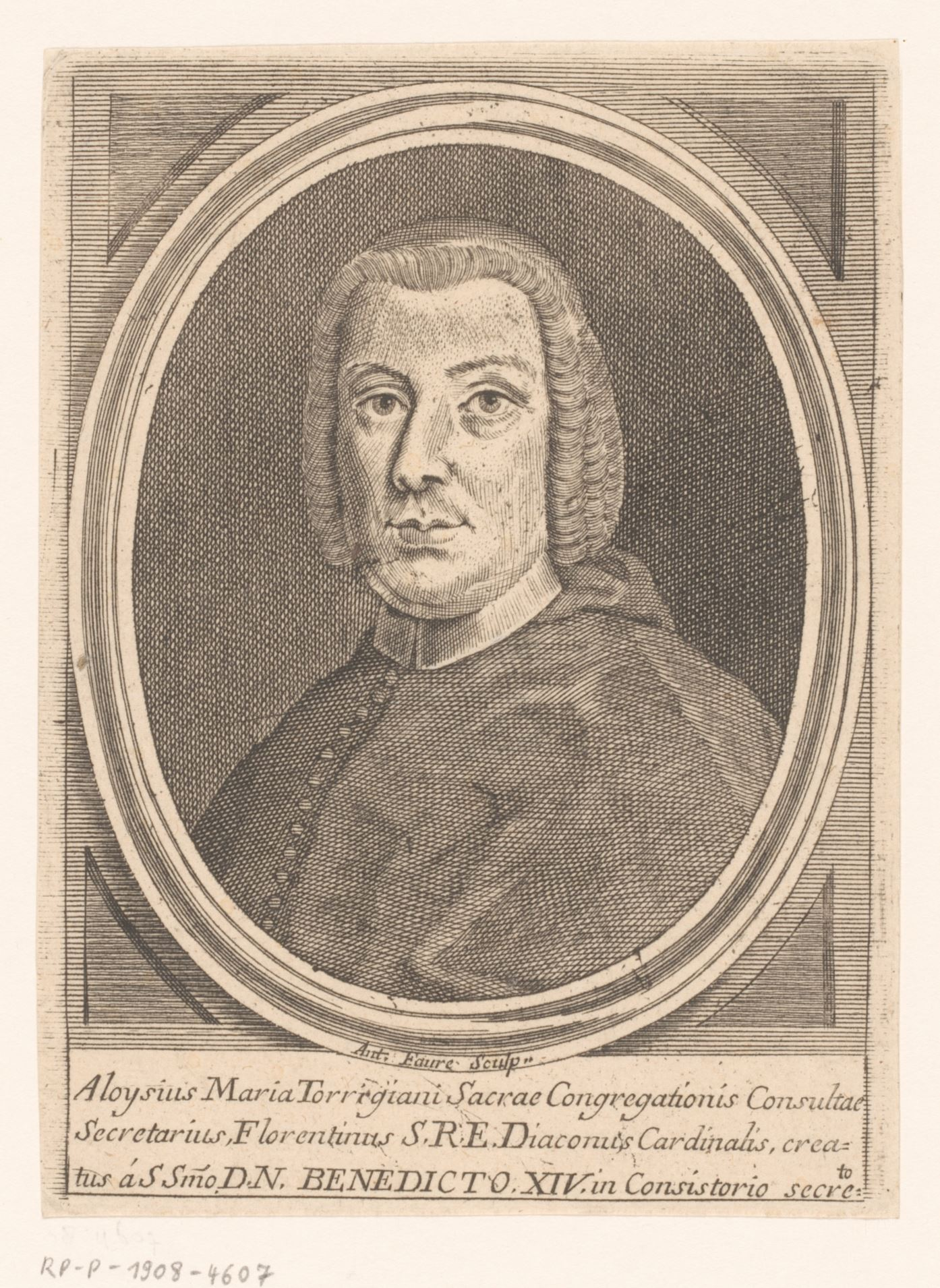
Ludovico Maria Torrigiani.

Luigi Maria Torreggiani (October 18, 1697 – January 6, 1777) was an Italian Cardinal. Some refer to him also as Ludovico Maria Torrigiani.

Born to an aristocratic family in Florence. His skills in ecclesiastical offices, led to a rapid rise in the Curia. He was installed by pope Benedict XIV as Cardinal by 1733. He became Cardinal Deacon of Santi Cosma e Damiano on 10 Dec 1753, was appointed Cardinal Deacon of Santi Vito, Modesto e Crescenzio in 1754, and Cardinal Deacon of Sant'Agata dei Goti in 1765. In 1758, he was named Cardinal Secretary of State for the Papacy by Clement XIII and remained a defender of the Jesuits. With the election of Pope Clement XIV, he was replaced in this office by Cardinal Pallavicini.

He attended the Papal conclaves of 1758, 1769 and 1774-75. He was buried in San Giovanni dei Fiorentini in Rome.
