= Francesco Scipione Maria Borghese =

Italian cardinal

- Cardinal-Bishop of Porto e Santa Rufina
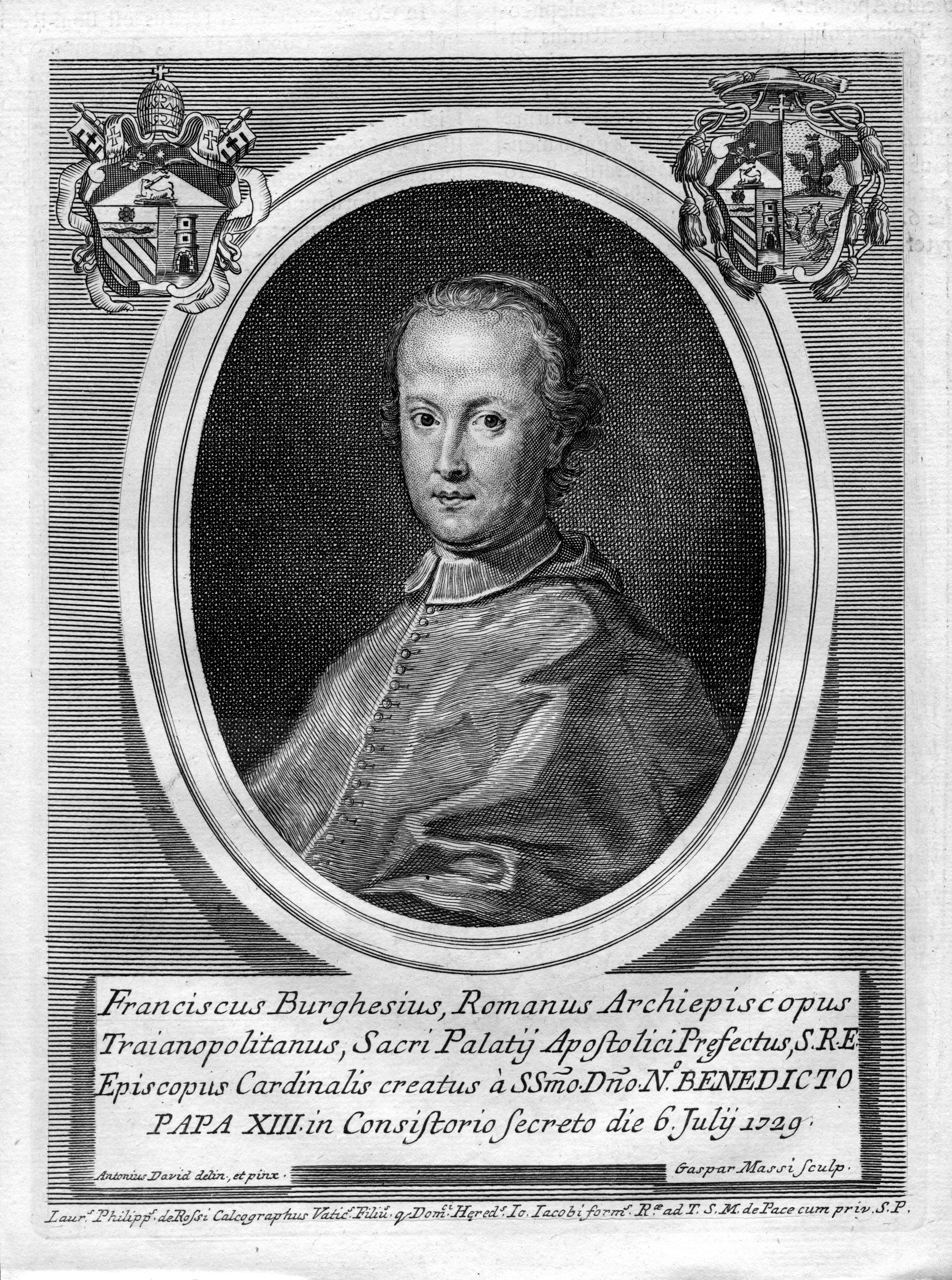
- Memorial of Francesco Scipione Maria Borghese
- Church: Roman Catholic Church
- Appointed: 12 February 1759
- Term ended: 21 June 1759
- Previous posts: Cardinal-Bishop of Albano (1752-1759); Cardinal-Priest of Santa Maria in Trastevere (1743-1752) Cardinal-Priest of San Silvestro in Capite (1732-1742); Cardinal-Priest of San Pietro in Montorio (1729-1732) Titular Archbishop of Traianopolis in Rhodope (1728-1729)

Orders
- Ordination: 19 February 1728 (Deacon); 25 February 1728 (Priest)
- Consecration: 30 March 1728 (Bishop) by Benedict XIII
- Created cardinal: 6 July 1729 by Benedict XIII

Personal details
- Born: 20 May 1697 Rome, Papal States
- Baptised: 20 May 1697
- Died: 21 June 1759 (aged 62) Rome, Papal States
- Buried: Santa Maria Maggiore

Francesco Scipione Maria Borghese (20 May 1697 − 21 June 1759) was an Italian cardinal from the Borghese family. He was elevated to cardinal by Pope Benedict XIII in the consistory of 6 July 1729.

He died in Rome on 21 June 1759 and was buried in the Patriarchal Liberian Basilica.

== Sources ==
- Francesco Scipione Maria Borghese at www.catholic-hierarchy.org ^{[self-published]}
- This page is a translation of its Italian counterpart.
