= Flavio Chigi (1711–1771) =

Catholic cardinal (1711–1771)

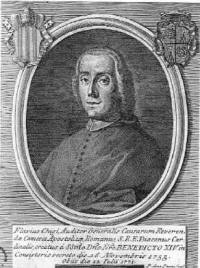
Cardinal Flavio Chigi

Flavio Chigi (8 September 1711 – 12 July 1771), Prince of Farnese, Duke of Ariccia and Prince of the Holy Roman Empire, was an Italian Roman Catholic cardinal. He was a member of the noble Chigi family, nephew of Fabio Chigi, Pope Alexander VII.

Born in Rome as a member of the Chigi family, he was created cardinal by Pope Benedict XIV in 1753.
