= Cardinals created by Clement XI =

Catholic appointments from 1703 to 1720

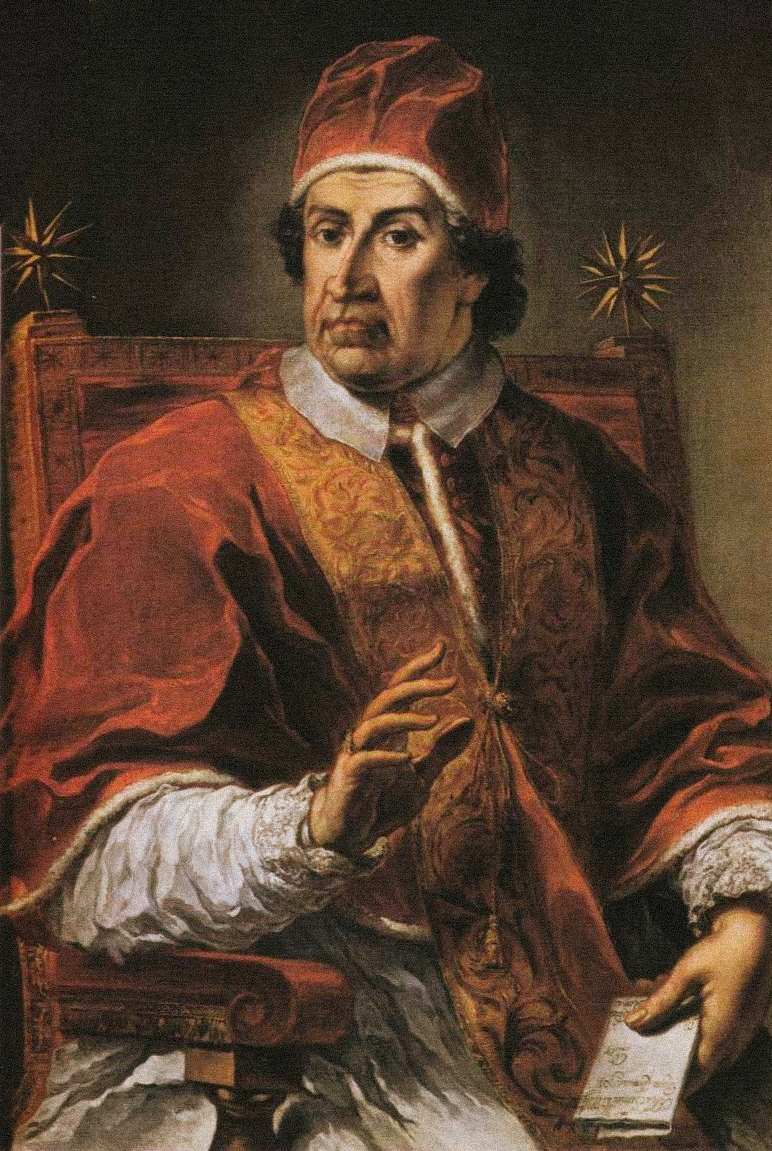
Pope Clement XI (1649-1721).

Pope Clement XI (r. 1700–1721) created 69 cardinals in 15 consistories:

== 17 December 1703 ==
1. Francesco Pignatelli, Theat., archbishop of Naples – cardinal-priest of SS. Marcellino e Pietro (received the title on 11 February 1704), then cardinal-bishop of Sabina (26 April 1719), cardinal-bishop of Frascati (12 June 1724), cardinal-bishop of Porto e S. Rufina (19 November 1725), † 5 December 1734

== 17 May 1706 ==
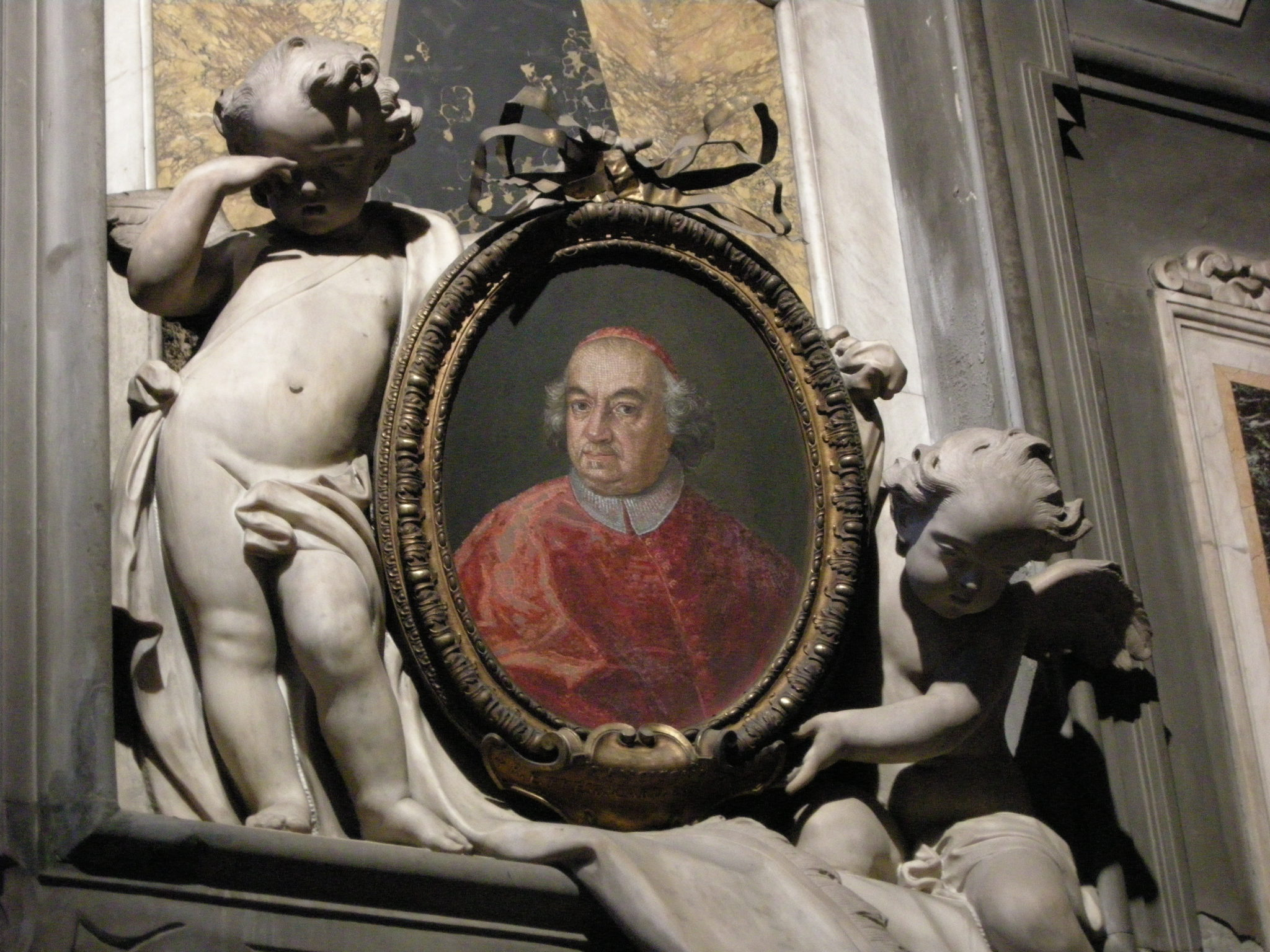
Francesco Martelli (1633-1717), made a cardinal on May 17, 1706.

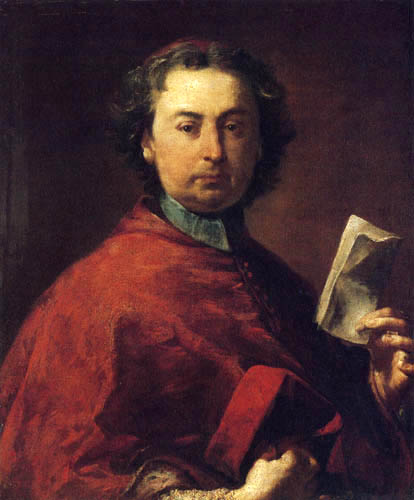
Tommaso Ruffo (1663-1753), made a cardinal on May 17, 1706.

1. Francesco Martelli, titular patriarch of Jerusalem– cardinal-priest of S. Eusebio (received the title on 25 June 1706), † 28 September 1717
2. Giovanni Alberto Badoer, patriarch of Venice – cardinal-priest of S. Marcello (received the title on 25 June 1706), then cardinal-priest of S. Marco (11 July 1712), † 17 May 1714
3. Lorenzo Casoni, titular archbishop of Cesarea – cardinal-priest of S. Bernardo alle Terme (received the title on 25 June 1706), then cardinal-priest of S. Pietro in Vincoli (21 January 1715), † 19 November 1720
4. Lorenzo Corsini, titular archbishop of Nicomedia, treasurer general of the Apostolic Camera – cardinal-priest of S. Susanna (received the title on 25 June 1706), then cardinal-priest of S. Pietro in Vincoli (16 December 1720), cardinal-bishop of Frascati (19 November 1725); became Pope Clement XII on 12 July 1730, † 6 February 1740
5. Lorenzo Maria Fieschi, archbishop of Genoa – cardinal-priest of S. Maria della Pace (received the title on 25 June 1706), † 1 May 1726
6. Francesco Acquaviva d'Aragona, titular archbishop of Larissa, nuncio in Spain – cardinal-priest of S. Bartolomeo all'Isola (received the title on 8 June 1707), then cardinal-priest of S. Cecilia (28 January 1709), cardinal-bishop of Sabina (12 June 1724), † 9 January 1725
7. Tommaso Ruffo, titular archbishop of Nicea – cardinal-priest of S. Lorenzo in Panisperna (received the title on 25 June 1706), then cardinal-priest of S. Maria in Trastevere (28 January 1709), cardinal-bishop of Palestrina (1 July 1726), cardinal-bishop of Porto e S. Rufina (3 September 1738), cardinal-bishop of Ostia e Velletri (29 August 1740), † 16 February 1753
8. Orazio Filippo Spada, bishop of Lucca, nuncio in Poland – cardinal-priest of S. Onofrio (received the title on 21 March 1707), † 28 June 1724
9. Filippo Antonio Gualterio, archbishop of Imolo, nuncio in France – cardinal-priest of S. Crisogono (received the title on 30 April 1708), then cardinal-priest of S. Cecilia (29 January 1725), cardinal-priest of S. Prassede (31 July 1726), † 21 April 1728
10. Christian August von Sachsen-Zeitz, bishop of Györ – cardinal-priest without the title, † 22 August 1725
11. Rannuzio Pallavicino, vice-camerlengo of the Holy Roman Church and governor of Rome – cardinal-priest of S. Agnese fuori le mura (received the title on 25 June 1706), † 30 June 1712
12. Carlo Colonna – cardinal-deacon of S. Maria della Scala (received the title on 25 June 1706), then cardinal-deacon of S. Angelo in Pescheria (6 May 1715), cardinal-deacon of S. Agata in Suburra (24 July 1730), † 8 July 1739
13. Giandomenico Paracciani – cardinal-priest of S. Anastasia (received the title on 25 June 1706), † 9 May 1721
14. Alessandro Caprara – cardinal-priest of SS. Nereo ed Achilleo (received the title on 25 June 1706), † 9 June 1711
15. Joseph-Emmanuel de La Trémoille – cardinal-priest of SS. Trinita al Monte Pincio (received the title on 25 June 1706), † 10 January 1720
16. Pietro Priuli – cardinal-deacon of S. Adriano (received the title on 25 June 1706), then cardinal-priest of S. Marco (6 May 1720), † 28 January 1728
17. Nicola Grimaldi I, secretary of the S. C. of Bishops and Regulars – cardinal-deacon of S. Maria in Cosmedin (received the title on 25 June 1706), then cardinal-priest of S. Matteo in Merulana (8 June 1716), † 25 October 1717
18. Carlo Agostino Fabroni, secretary of the S. C. of Propaganda Fide – cardinal-priest of S. Agostino (received the title on 25 June 1706), † 19 September 1727
19. Giuseppe Vallemani, titular archbishop of Athens (created in pectore, published on 1 August 1707) – cardinal-priest of S. Maria degli Angeli (received the title on 28 November 1707), † 15 December 1725

Gabriele Filipucci declined the promotion to the cardinalate.

== 7 June 1706 ==
1. Michelangelo Conti, titular archbishop of Tarso, nuncio in Portugal – cardinal-priest of SS. Quirico e Giulitta (received the title on 23 February 1711), became Pope Innocent XIII on 8 May 1721, † 7 March 1724

== 1 August 1707 ==
1. Charles-Thomas Maillard De Tournon, titular patriarch of Antioch – cardinal-priest without the title, † 8 June 1710

== 15 April 1709 ==
1. Ulisse Giuseppe Gozzadini, titular archbishop of Teodosia, secretary of the Briefs to the Princes – cardinal-priest of S. Croce in Gerusalemme (received the title on 19 June 1709), † 20 March 1728
2. Antonio Francesco Sanvitale, archbishop of Urbino (created in pectore, published on 22 July 1709) – cardinal-priest of S. Pietro in Montorio (received the title on 9 September 1709), † 17 December 1714

== 23 December 1711 ==
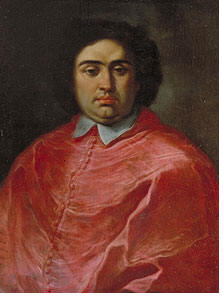
Annibale Albani (1682-1751), made a cardinal on December 23, 1711.

1. Annibale Albani, nephew of the Pope – cardinal-deacon of S. Eustachio (received the title on 2 March 1712), then cardinal-deacon of S. Maria in Cosmedin (8 June 1716), cardinal-priest of S. Clemente (6 July 1722), cardinal-bishop of Sabina (24 July 1730), cardinal-bishop of Porto e S. Rufina (9 September 1743), † 21 October 1751

== 18 May 1712 ==
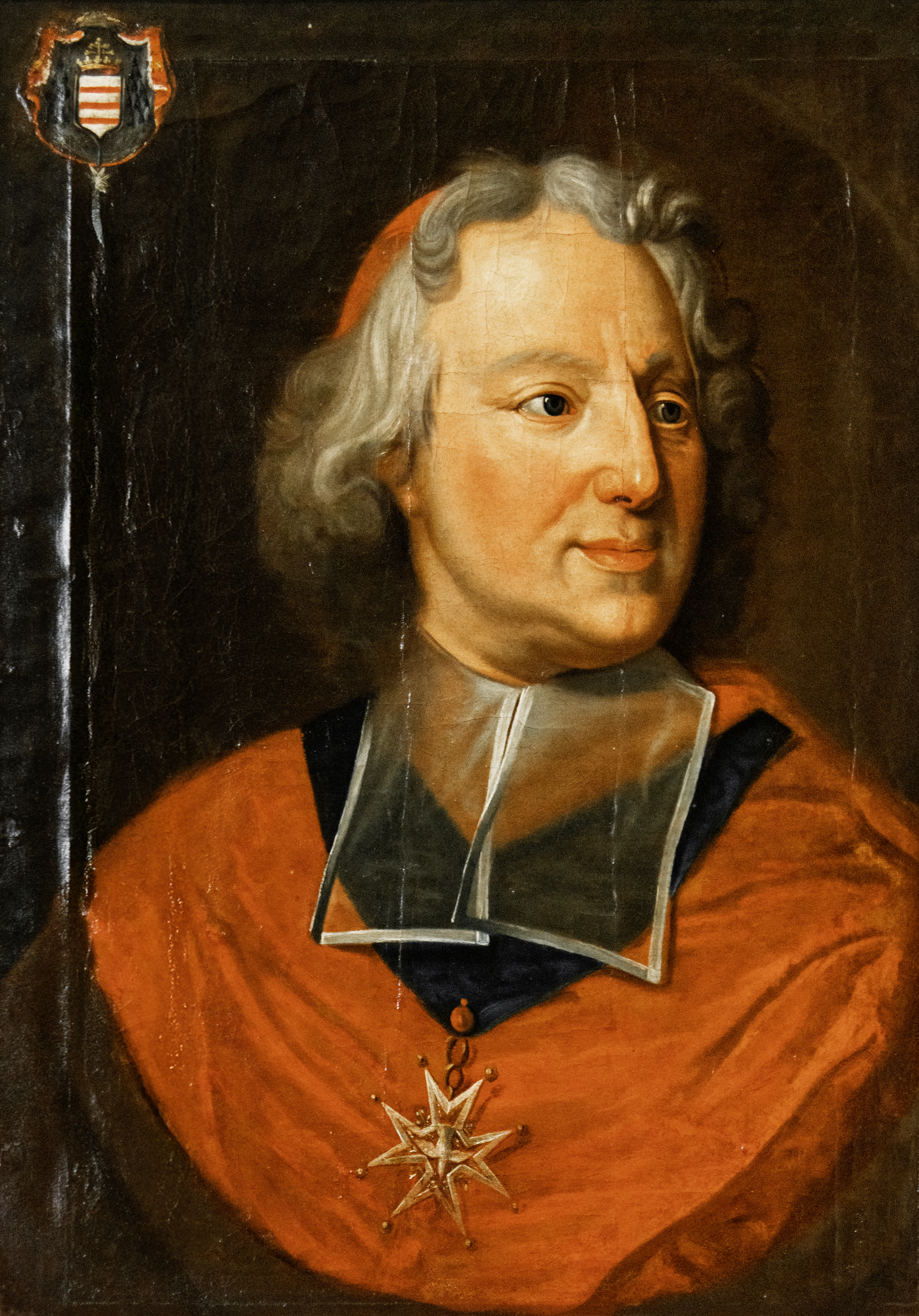
Melchior de Polignac (1661-1742), made a cardinal on May 18, 1712.

1. Gianantonio Davia, archbishop of Rimini – cardinal-priest of S. Callisto (received the title on 30 August 1713), then cardinal-priest of S. Pietro in Vincoli (19 November 1725), cardinal-priest of S. Lorenzo in Lucina (11 February 1737), † 11 January 1740
2. Agostino Cusani, bishop of Pavia – cardinal-priest of S. Maria del Popolo (received the title on 30 January 1713), 27 December 1730
3. Giulio Piazza, bishop of Faenza – cardinal-priest of S. Lorenzo in Panisperna (received the title on 16 April 1714), 23 April 1726
4. Antonio Felice Zondadari (elder), titular archbishop of Damasco – cardinal-priest of S. Balbina (received the title on 23 September 1715), then cardinal-priest of S. Prassede (9 April 1731), † 23 November 1737
5. Armand Gaston Maximilien de Rohan, bishop of Strasbourg – cardinal-priest of SS. Trinita al Monte Pincio (received the title on 16 June 1721), † 19 July 1749
6. Nuno da Cunha e Ataíde, titular bishop of Targa, inquisitor general of Portugal – cardinal-priest of S. Anastasia (received the title on 16 June 1721), † 3 December 1750
7. Wolfgang Hannibal von Schrattenbach, bishop of Olomouc – cardinal-priest of S. Marcello (received the title on 7 December 1714), † 22 July 1722
8. Luigi Priuli – cardinal-priest of S. Marcello (received the title on 11 July 1712), then cardinal-priest of S. Marco (28 May 1714), † 15 March 1720
9. Giuseppe Maria Tomasi di Lampedusa, Theat. – cardinal-priest of SS. Silvestro e Martino (received the title on 11 July 1712), † 1 January 1713
10. Giovanni Battista Tolomei, S.J. – cardinal-priest of S. Stefano al Monte Celio (received the title on 11 July 1712), 19 January 1726
11. Francesco Maria Casini, O.F.M.Cap. – cardinal-priest of S. Prisca (received the title on 11 July 1712), † 14 February 1719
12. Lodovico Pico della Mirandola, titular patriarch of Constantinople (created in pectore, published on 26 September 1712) – cardinal-priest of S. Silvestro in Capite (received the title on 21 November 1712), then cardinal-priest of S. Prassede (24 April 1728), cardinal-bishop of Albano (9 April 1731), cardinal-bishop of Porto e S. Rufina (29 August 1740), † 10 August 1743
13. Giovanni Battista Bussi, archbishop of Ancona (created in pectore, published on 26 September 1712) – cardinal-priest of S. Maria in Aracoeli (received the title on 30 January 1713), † 23 December 1726
14. Pier Marcellino Corradini, titular archbishop of Athens (created in pectore, published on 26 September 1712) – cardinal-priest of S. Giovanni a Porta Latina (received the title on 21 November 1712), then cardinal-priest of S. Maria in Trastevere (11 September 1726), cardinal-bishop of Frascati (15 December 1734), † 8 February 1743
15. Curzio Origo (created in pectore, published on 26 September 1712) – cardinal-deacon of S. Maria in Domnica (received the title on 21 November 1712), then cardinal-deacon of S. Eustachio (1 July 1716), cardinal-priest of S. Eustachio (20 March 1726), † 18 March 1737
16. Manuel Arias y Porres, archbishop of Seville (created in pectore, published on 30 January 1713) – cardinal-priest without the title, † 16 November 1717
17. Benito de Sala y de Caramany, bishop of Barcelona (created in pectore, published on30 January 1713) – cardinal-priest without the title, † 2 July 1715
18. Melchior de Polignac (created in pectore, published on30 January 1713) – cardinal-deacon of S. Maria in Portico (received the title on 27 September 1724), then cardinal-priest of S. Maria in Via (20 November 1724), cardinal-priest of S. Maria degli Angeli (19 December 1725), † 20 November 1741

== 30 January 1713 ==
1. Benedetto Odescalchi-Erba, archbishop of Milan, nuncio in Poland – cardinal-priest of SS. Nereo ed Achilleo (received the title on 1 April 1715), then cardinal-priest of SS. XII Apostoli (29 January 1725), † 13 December 1740
2. Damian Hugo Philipp von Schönborn (created in pectore, published on 29 May 1715) – cardinal-deacon of S. Nicola in Carcere (received the title on 16 June 1721), then cardinal-priest of S. Pancrazio (10 September 1721), cardinal-priest of S. Maria della Pace (23 December 1726), † 19 August 1743

== 6 May 1715 ==
1. Fabio Olivieri, secretary of the Apostolic Briefs – cardinal-deacon of SS. Vito e Modesto (received the title on 23 September 1715), † 9 February 1738

== 29 May 1715 ==
1. Henri Pons de Thiard de Bissy, bishop of Meaux – cardinal-priest of SS. Quirico e Giulitta (received the title on 16 June 1721), then cardinal-priest of S. Bernardo alle Terme (14 August 1730), † 26 July 1737
2. Innico Caracciolo, bishop of Aversa (created in pectore, published on 16 December 1715) – cardinal-priest of S. Tommaso in Parione (received the title on 30 March 1716), † 6 September 1730
3. Bernardino Scotti, vice-camerlengo of the Holy Roman Church and governor of Rome (created in pectore, published on 16 December 1715) – cardinal-priest of S. Pietro in Montorio (received the title on 5 February 1716), † 16 November 1726
4. Carlo Maria Marini (created in pectore, published on 16 December 1715) – cardinal-deacon of S. Maria in Aquiro (received the title on 6 February 1716), then cardinal-deacon of SS. Vito e Modesto (23 June 1738), cardinal-deacon of S. Agata in Suburra (15 July 1739), cardinal-deacon of S. Maria in Via Lata (7 August 1741), † 16 January 1747

== 16 December 1715 ==
1. Niccolò Caracciolo, archbishop of Capua – cardinal-priest of SS. Silvestro e Martino (received the title on 6 February 1716), † 7 February 1728
2. Giovanni Patrizi, titular archbishop of Seleucia – cardinal-priest of SS. IV Coronati (received the title on 6 February 1716), † 31 July 1727
3. Ferdinando Nuzzi, titular archbishop of Nicea, secretary of the S. C. of Bishop and Regulars – cardinal-priest of S. Pudenziana (received the title on 6 February 1716), † 1 December 1717
4. Nicola Gaetano Spinola, titular archbishop of Tebe – cardinal-priest of S. Sisto (received the title on 8 June 1716), then cardinal-priest of SS. Nereo ed Achilleo (29 January 1725), † 12 April 1735

== 15 March 1717 ==
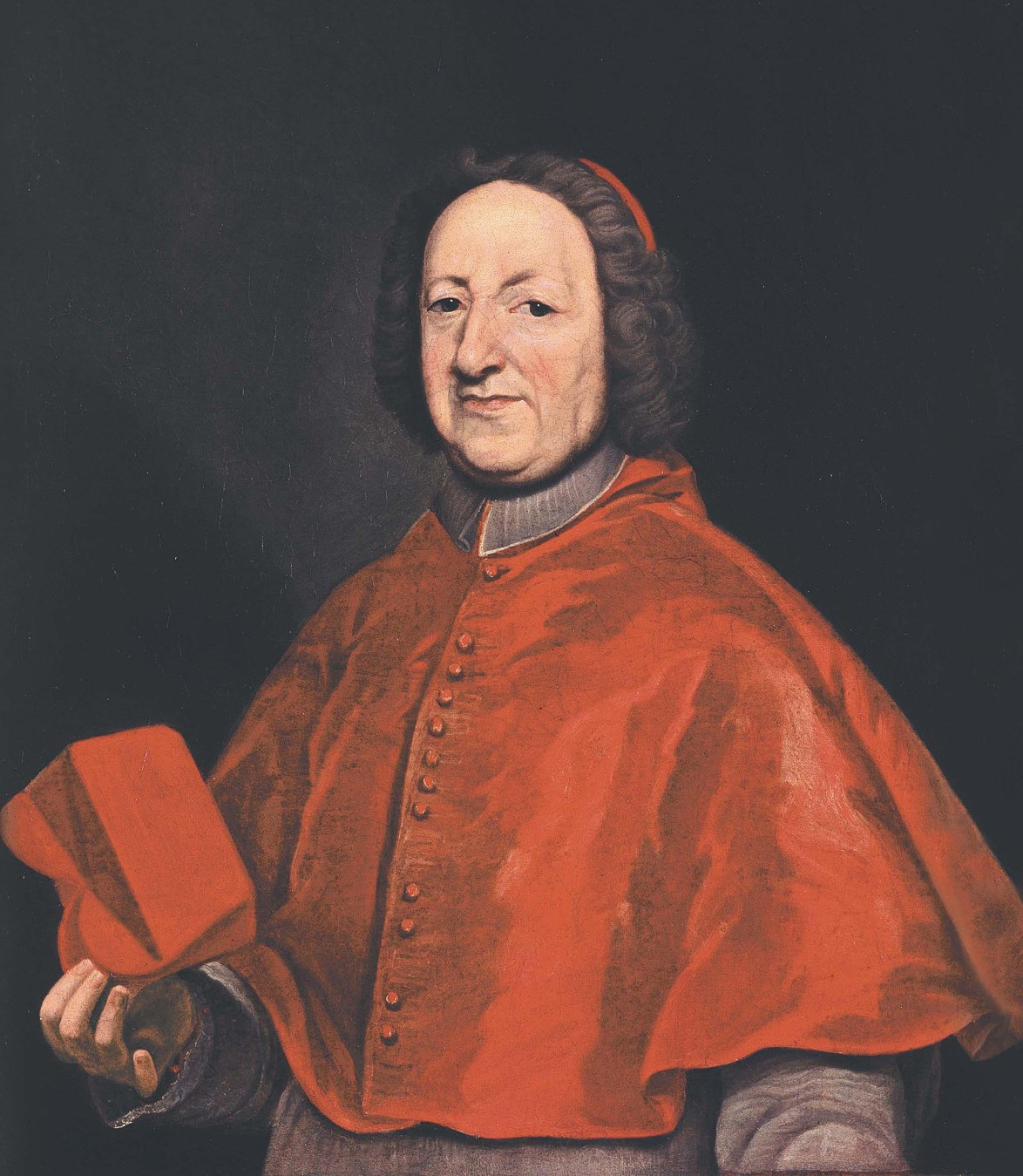
Giulio Alberoni (1664-1752), made a cardinal on July 12, 1717.

1. Giberto Bartolomeo Borromeo, titular patriarch of Antioch and bishop of Novara – cardinal-priest of S. Alessio (received the title on 10 May 1717), † 22 January 1740

== 12 July 1717 ==
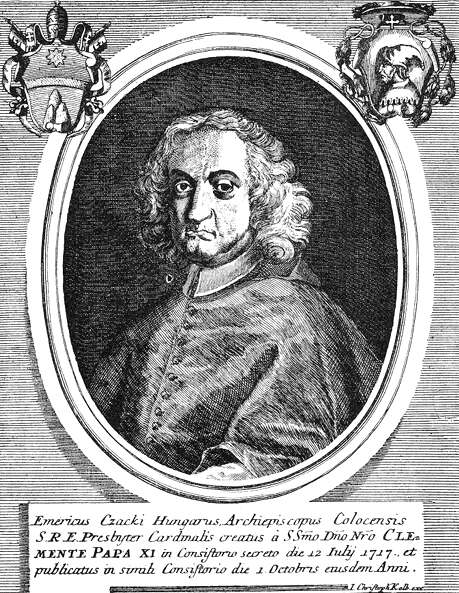
Imre Csáky (1672-1732), made a cardinal on July 12, 1717.

1. Giulio Alberoni – cardinal-deacon of S. Adriano (received the title on 12 June 1724), then cardinal-priest of S. Crisogono (20 September 1728), cardinal-priest of S. Lorenzo in Lucina (29 August 1740), † 26 June 1752
2. Imre Csáky, archbishop of Kalocsa-Bacs (created in pectore, published on 1 October 1717) – cardinal-priest of S. Eusebio (received the title on 16 June 1721), † 28 August 1732

== 29 November 1719 ==
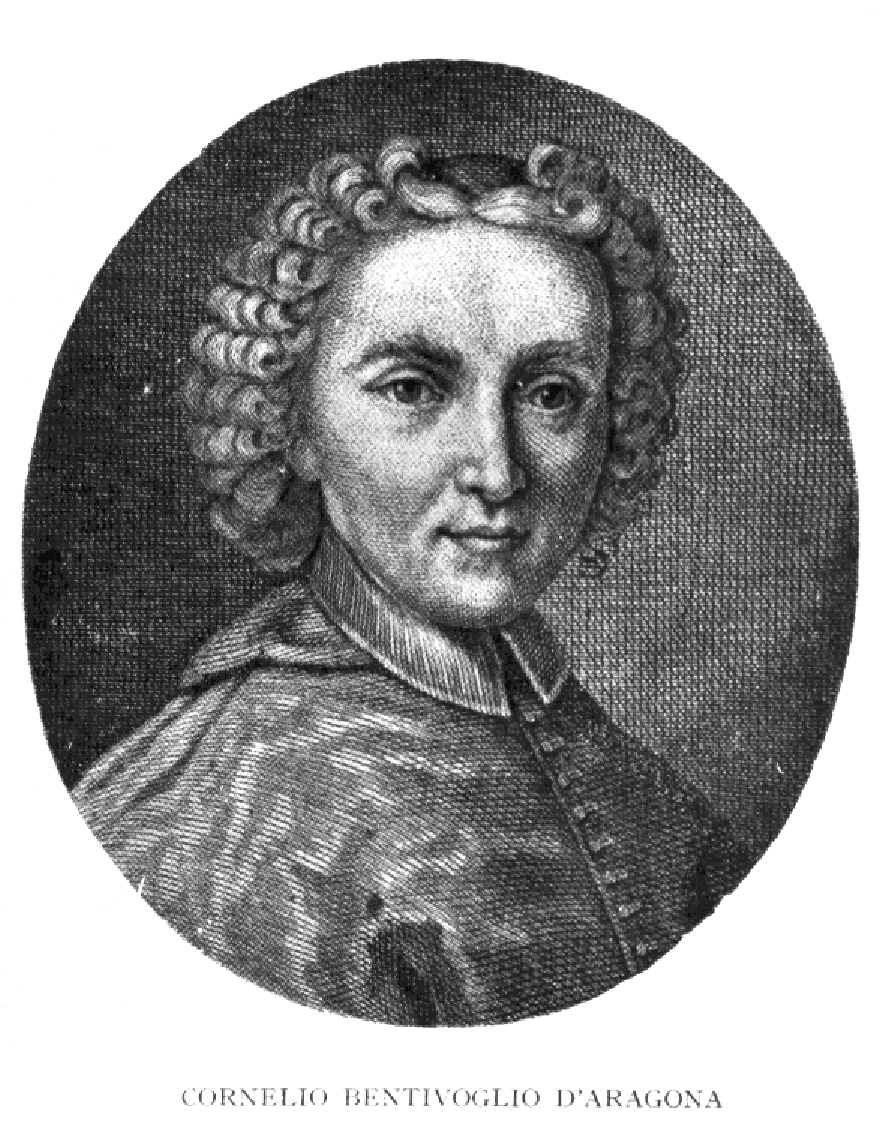
Cornelio Bentivoglio (1668-1732), made a cardinal on November 29, 1719.

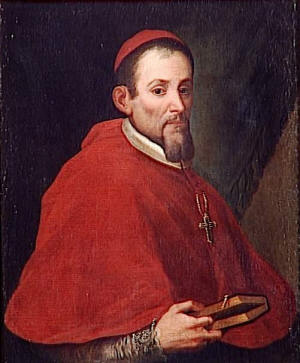
Luis Antonio Belluga y Moncada (1662-1743), made a cardinal on November 29, 1719.

1. Léon Potier de Gesvres, archbishop of Bourges – cardinal-priest without the title, † 12 November 1744
2. François de Mailly, archbishop of Reims – cardinal-priest without the title, † 13 September 1721
3. Giorgio Spinola, titular archbishop of Cesarea, nuncio in Austria – cardinal-priest of S. Agnese fuori le mura (received the title on 20 January 1721), then cardinal-priest of S. Maria in Trastevere (15 December 1734), cardinal-priest of S. Prassede (16 December 1737), cardinal-bishop of Palestrina (3 September 1738), † 17 January 1739
4. Cornelio Bentivoglio, titular archbishop of Cartago, nuncio in France – cardinal-priest of S. Girolamo degli Schiavoni (received the title on 15 April 1721), then cardinal-priest of S. Cecilia (25 June 1727), † 30 December 1732
5. Thomas Philip Wallrad de Hénin-Liétard d'Alsace, archbishop of Mechlin – cardinal-priest of S. Cesareo in Palatio (received the title on 16 June 1721), then cardinal-priest of S. Balbina (2 December 1733), cardinal-priest of S. Lorenzo in Lucina (17 July 1752), † 5 January 1759
6. Luis Antonio Belluga y Moncada, C.O., bishop of Cartagena – cardinal-priest of S. Maria Traspontina (received the title on 16 June 1721), then cardinal-priest of S. Prisca (20 February 1726), cardinal-priest of S. Maria in Trastevere (16 December 1737), cardinal-priest of S. Prassede (3 September 1738), † 22 February 1743
7. José Pereira de Lacerda, bishop of Faro – cardinal-priest of S. Susanna (received the title on 16 June 1721), † 28 September 1738
8. Michael Friedrich Althan, bishop of Vác – cardinal-priest of S. Sabina (received the title on 16 September 1720), † 20 June 1734
9. Giovanni Battista Salerni, S.J. – cardinal-priest of S. Prisca (received the title on 16 September 1720), then cardinal-priest of S. Stefano al Monte Celio (20 February 1726), † 30 January 1729
10. Giovanni Francesco Barbarigo, bishop of Brescia (created in pectore, published on30 September 1720) – cardinal-priest of SS. Marcellino e Pietro (received the title on 20 January 1721), † 26 January 1730

== 30 September 1720 ==
1. Carlos de Borja y Centellas, patriarch of the West Indies – cardinal-priest of S. Pudenziana (received the title on 16 June 1721), † 8 August 1733
2. Juan Álvaro Cienfuegos Villazón, S.J. – cardinal-priest of S. Bartolomeo all'Isola (received the title on 16 June 1721), † 19 August 1739

== Sources ==
- Miranda, Salvador. "Consistories for the creation of Cardinals 18th Century (1700-1799): Clement XI (1700-1721)". The Cardinals of the Holy Roman Church. Florida International University. OCLC 53276621.
- Remigius Ritzler: Hierarchia Catholica, vol. V, Münster 1952
