= List of Cardinal protectors of Scotland =

This is a list of Cardinal protectors of Scotland. Protectors represented the interests of a particular religious institution or nation at the Papal court. This particular office was revitalised upon the establishment of the Scots College in Rome by Pope Clement VIII on 5 December 1600, when it was put under the authority of Cardinal Camillo Borghese. The last Cardinal to hold the office died in 1970.

== Protectors ==
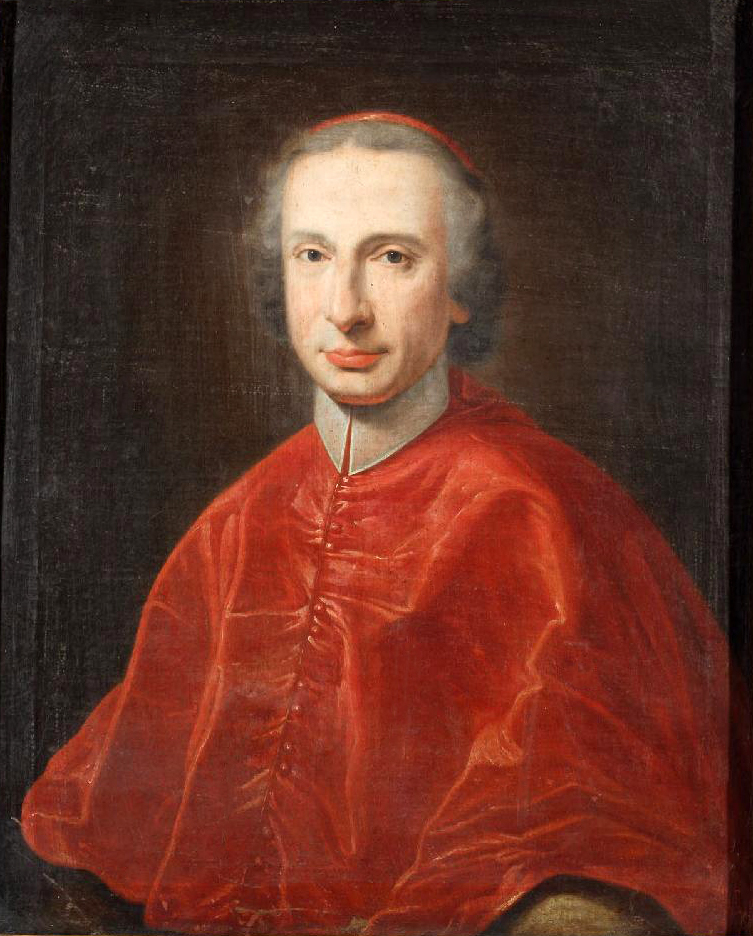
The Scottish Mission enjoyed notable support under Cardinal Giuseppe Spinelli who was a close friend of The Old Pretender.

=== Pre-Reformation ===
- Antonio Pallavicini Gentili, 1504–07
- Pietro Accolti, 1514–32
- Benedetto Accolti, 1532–38
- Rodolfo Pio da Carpi, 1538–49
- Giovanni Domenico de Cupis, 1550–53
- Niccolò Caetani, 1570–85

=== Post-Reformation ===
- Camillo Borghese, 1600–05
- Maffeo Barberini, 1607/8–23
- Francesco Barberini, 1623–79
- Philip Howard, 1680–94
- Alessandro Caprara, 1694–1706
- Giuseppe Sacripante, 1706–27
- Alessandro Falconieri, 1727–34
- Domenico Riviera, 1734–52
- Giuseppe Spinelli, 1753–63
- Gian Francesco Albani, 1763–73; 1780–1803
- Mario Marefoschi, 1773–74
- Francesco Carafa, 1774–80
- Charles Erskine, 1803–11
- Bartolomeo Pacca, 1811–35
- Giacomo Filippo Fransoni, 1835–56
- Alessandro Barnabò, 1856–74
- Alessandro Franchi, 1874–78
- Giovanni Simeoni, 1878–92
- Mieczysław Halka-Ledóchowski, 1892–1902
- Girolamo Maria Gotti, 1902–16
- Domenico Serafini, 1916–18
- Gaetano de Lai, 1918–28
- Rafael Merry del Val, 1928–30
- Franz Ehrle, 1930–34
- Francesco Marchetti Selvaggiani, 1934–51
- Giuseppe Pizzardo, 1951–70

== See also ==
- Scots College, Rome
- Cardinal protector of England
