= George Martine =

George Martine may refer to:

- George Martine (historian) (1635–1712), Scottish historian
- George Martine (physician) (1700–1741), Scottish physician
