= John Hackett =

John Hackett may refer to:

- Sir John Winthrop Hackett (1848–1916), Irish-born Australian newspaper man and politician
- Sir John Hackett (British Army officer) (John Winthrop Hackett, 1910–1997), Australian-born British soldier and author
- John Hackett (Irish politician) (1865–1940), Member of Parliament for Mid Tipperary, 1910–1918
- John Hackett (musician) (born 1955), British musician
- John Hackett (Wisconsin politician) (1808–1886), American businessman and politician
- John K. Hackett (1821–1879), New York judge and politician
- John Thomas Hackett (1884–1956), Canadian lawyer
- John Francis Hackett (1911–1990), American prelate of the Roman Catholic Church
- John Hackett (1930-2020), American actor

== See also ==
- John Hacket (1592–1670), English churchman, Bishop of Lichfield and Coventry 1661–1670
- John-Baptist Hackett (died 1676), Irish theologian
