= Paul MacPherson =

The Reverend Paul MacPherson
- Born: 4 March 1756; Scalan, Scotland
- Died: 24 November 1846 (aged 90); Rome, Papal States
- Education: Scots College, Rome; Scots College, Valladolid

Ecclesiastical career
- Church: Roman Catholic
- Ordained: 6 April 1779 (priest) by Alonso Marcos de Llanes Argüelles

Abbé Paul MacPherson (4 March 1756 – 24 November 1846), was a Catholic clergyman who became the first Scottish secular priest appointed rector of the Scots College, Rome.

== Life ==
He was born in Scalan, Aberdeenshire on 4 March 1756 to Paul MacPherson and Jean Cumming. At the age of thirteen, he travelled to the Scots College in Rome to study for the priesthood. Owing to illness he was sent to Royal Scots College, Valladolid in Spain where he was ordained on Easter Monday 1779.

In 1793, he was nominated as agent of the Scottish mission to Rome, and in August he left Scotland to take up his duties. His work was interrupted by the French invasion in 1798, and he fled home taking the students with him. He returned in 1800 to recover the College properties.

In 1801, a Papal Decree recognised the right of the British colleges to appoint national superiors. McPherson became the first rector of the Scots College Rome from the ranks of the Scottish secular clergy. In 1820, he was finally able to welcome the first students to the College since it had been abandoned in 1798.

McPherson wished to return to Scotland, but it was not until 1827 after his replacement, Angus Macdonald, the new Rector, arrived, that he was able to leave Rome.

Around 1834, the vicars apostolic of Scotland sent the seventy-eight-year-old McPherson to Rome to deliver a report on the state of religion in Scotland. The bishops stated that due to poverty, most of the priests did not have their own house, but were obliged to live in the cabin of a parishioner. Cardinal Henry Benedict Stuart had bequeathed a portion of his property to the Scottish Church, but it appears not to have been paid.

MacPherson found that his successor as rector, Macdonald, had died suddenly, and the college had been closed. Alexander Grant arrived in 1841 to assist him as Vice-Rector being Rector in all but name. In total he had been in charge of the college for 38 years. He remained in Rome and died on 24 November 1846.

Having nursed the college through the difficulties of the Napoleonic period he has been called the saviour of the college. He was buried in the college chapel, Sant'Andrea degli Scozzesi (Church of St Andrews of the Scots), on the via Quattro Fontane.
