= Philip Howard (cardinal) =

English Roman Catholic cardinal

His Eminence Philip Thomas Howard O.P
- Archpriest of Saint Mary Major
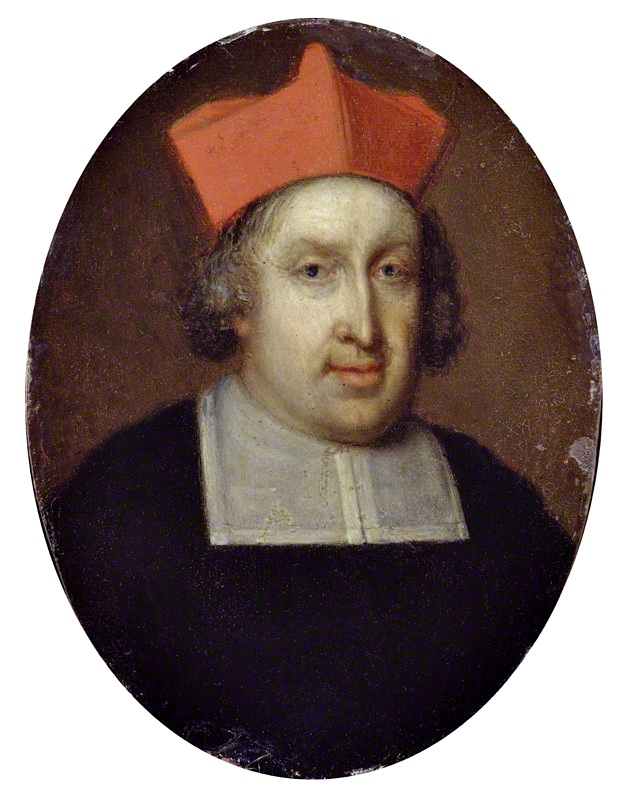
- Church: Roman Catholic
- In office: 1689–1694
- Predecessor: Felice Rospigliosi
- Successor: Benedetto Pamphili
- Other post: Cardinal-Priest of Santa Maria sopra Minerva (1679–94)
- Previous posts: Cardinal-Priest of Santa Cecilia (1676–79); Titular Bishop of Helenopolis in Bithynia (1672–76)

Orders
- Ordination: 1652
- Created cardinal: 27 May 1675 by Pope Clement X
- Rank: Cardinal-Priest

Personal details
- Born: Philip Howard; 21 September 1629 Arundel House, London, England
- Died: 17 June 1694 (aged 64) Rome, Papal States
- Buried: Santa Maria sopra Minerva
- Parents: Henry Howard, 15th Earl of Arundel; Elizabeth Stuart

Philip Howard (21 September 1629 – 17 June 1694) was an English Roman Catholic cardinal.

== Life ==
Philip Howard was born the third son of Henry Frederick Howard (afterwards Earl of Arundel and Surrey and head of the House of Norfolk) and his wife, Elizabeth Stuart (daughter of Esme Stuart, the Duke of Lennox), at Arundel House in London.

He was brought up in the Church of England. In 1642, he traveled to the continent with his grandfather, Thomas Howard, 14th Earl of Arundel, who had accompanied Princess Mary and her mother, Queen Henrietta Maria, to the Dutch Republic after the princess' marriage to William of Orange. In Antwerp, Philip encountered his grandmother, Alethea Howard, who was at the time living in that city. Through her influence and that of Dominican friar John-Baptist Hackett, the boy was introduced to Catholicism.

At the age of sixteen he joined the Dominican Order in Cremona. He was professed at Rome in 1646, taking the name Thomas. Residing at Naples for his studies, he was chosen to deliver a Latin address to the general chapter of his order in Rome. He delivered a fervent address on the conversion of England, which led to a decree being passed by the chapter, urging provincials and priors to do all they could to receive English, Irish, and Scotch novices into the order, with a view to its preservation in those countries. He was ordained in 1652. He founded the priory of Bornem in Flanders, with a college for English youths attached to it, and was himself the first prior and novice master. He also founded at Vilvoorde a convent of nuns of the Second Order of Saint Dominic, which later moved to Carisbrooke on the Isle of Wight.

In the reign of Charles II, Father Howard was made grand almoner to Queen Catherine of Braganza. He resided at St. James's Palace, with a salary of 500 pounds a year, and had a position of influence at Court.

Following an outbreak of anti-Catholic sentiment, he left England and resumed his position as prior at Bornem. In 1672 he was nominated as Vicar Apostolic of England with a see in partibus, but the appointment, owing to the opposition of the "English Chapter" to his being a Vicar Apostolic, and the insistence that he should be a bishop with ordinary jurisdiction, was not confirmed. He was made cardinal in 1675, by Pope Clement X, being assigned the title of Santa Cecilia in Trastevere, exchanged later for the Dominican church of Santa Maria sopra Minerva. He now took up his residence at Rome, especially watching over the interests of the Catholic faith in England. He was to have been Bishop of Helenopolis. In 1679 he was made Protector of England and Scotland. At his insistence the Feast of St. Edward the Confessor was extended to the whole Church. He rebuilt the English College in Rome, and revised the rules of Douai College.

Howard cooperated later with James II in the increase of Vicars Apostolic in England from one to four, one of whom was his former secretary, John Leyburn. This arrangement lasted until 1840, when Pope Gregory XVI increased the number to eight. Gilbert Burnet wrote in his History that Cardinal Howard regretted the steps which led to the crisis in the reign of James II and which Howard sought to avert. The cardinal's plans were thwarted and the mission of Roger Palmer, Earl of Castlemaine to Rome showed the rise of another spirit that he did not share. When the crisis he foresaw came, he had the consolation at least of knowing that his foundation at Bornem was beyond the grasp of the anti-Catholic reaction in England. Cardinal Howard assisted at three conclaves, for the election of Innocent XI in 1676, Alexander VIII in 1689, and Innocent XII in 1691, and held the position of Camerlengo of the College of Cardinals. He died in the twentieth year of his cardinalate, at the age of 64, and was buried in his titular church of Santa Maria sopra Minerva at Rome. A monument of white marble with the arms of the Howards honours his memory.

Catholic Church titles
Preceded by Giuseppe Eusanio	Titular Bishop of Helenopolis in Bithynia; 1672–1676	Succeeded by Johannes Schmitzberger
Preceded by Ottavio Acquaviva d'Aragona (iuniore)	Cardinal-Priest of Santa Cecilia; 1676–1679	Succeeded by Giambattista Spínola (seniore)
Preceded by Jean-François-Paul de Gondi de Retz	Cardinal-Priest of Santa Maria sopra Minerva; 1679–1694	Succeeded by José Sáenz de Aguirre
Preceded by Felice Rospigliosi	Archpriest of the Basilica di Santa Maria Maggiore; 1689–1694	Succeeded by Benedetto Pamphilj
