= Scots College (Rome) =

Catholic seminary in Rome

Coordinates: 41°57′27″N 12°27′25″E

Pontifical Scots College, Rome
- Latin: Pontificium Collegium Scotorum de Urbe
- Motto: Salva me Bona Crux
- Type: Seminary
- Established: 5 December 1600; 425 years ago
- Founder: Pope Clement VIII
- Affiliations: Jesuits (1615–1773)
- Religious affiliation: Latin Catholic
- Rector: Very Reverend Mark Canon Cassidy
- Location: Rome, Italy
- Nickname: The Scots College
- Website: scotscollege.org

The Pontifical Scots College (Italian: Il Pontificio Collegio Scozzese) in Rome is the main seminary for the training of men for the priesthood from the dioceses of the Catholic Church in Scotland. It was established, in response to the religious persecution which began with the Scottish Reformation Parliament and ended only with Catholic Emancipation in 1829, by a bull of Pope Clement VIII on 5 December 1600.

== History ==
=== Beginnings ===
In the aftermath of the Protestant Reformation in Scotland in the sixteenth century, Catholicism in Scotland had declined into small pockets in certain parts of the country, and in those places where there were still Catholic noblemen or gentry. Exiled Catholic clergy attempted to recover and reform the extant Scottish ecclesiastical institutions abroad, and or establish new ones, in accordance with the decrees of the Council of Trent (1545–63), which established the training of diocesan priests within seminaries. Petitioning began for such a Scots institution to be established in the central location of Rome where there already had been an existing Scots Hospice from 1475.

The Scots College was established by Pope Clement VIII on 5 December 1600, when it was assigned the revenue of the old Scots' hospice. It was placed under the authority of a Cardinal protector, the first of whom was Camillo Borghese. At first the college was sited in a little house in the present Via del Tritone, opposite the church of Santa Maria di Costantinopoli. The college opened in 1602 with only eleven students, but at first was not constituted solely for the training of priests to return to Scotland as missionaries. In 1604 it was transferred to Via Felice, now called Via delle Quattro Fontane. The first rector was a papal official, Monsignor Paolini, who died in 1612. After petition by the students themselves, administration was handed over to the Jesuits in 1615. The martyrdom of Saint John Ogilvie in Glasgow compelled the students to take a mission oath whence the sole purpose of the college became the training of priests. The foundation of the Congregation De Propaganda Fide proved a significant turning point for missionary efforts in Scotland. At this time the college also became strongly linked with the powerful Barberini family. A church, Sant'Andrea degli Scozzesi, was constructed in the 1640s adjacent to the buildings of the college for the celebration of feasts and the burial of the dead.

=== 17th century ===
At times in the mid seventeenth century, the college was embroiled in the rivalry between secular clergy and Jesuits. The latter was accused of recruiting students for the Scots mission for their own number. In 1645 Pope Innocent X ruled that the mission oath was a commitment of life-long service to the Scottish mission, even if a student eventually opted to enter a religious order. A meeting of Scottish secular clergy in Paris during the winter of 1649–50 decided that a mission of their own should formally be set up with a superior. In addition, one of their own would remain in Rome as an agent to protect the missions interests. The first of these agents sent to Rome was William Leslie, who was to become a significant figure in the history of the college. For many years, he kept a watchful eye over its affairs. Disputes with the Jesuits continued, they argued that the oath actually deterred students, and desired full control over the college. Leslie, however, was able to persuade the Propaganda to rule the oath perpetually binding in 1660.

In the latter half of the seventeenth century, the college became a centre of devotion to Saint Margaret of Scotland, having been gifted some of relics. William Leslie and his relative the rector William Aloysius Leslie, petitioned for the Saint to be added to the universal calendar of the Church, approved by Pope Clement X in 1673. A relic was obtained from the Scots College Douai, until then the main centre of devotion to the Saint, and the altar of St Margaret in Sant'Andrea degli Scozzese was provided with a painting. William Aloysius Leslie was able to have her patronage of Scotland and the Scots Colleges recognised by the Church.

During the Glorious Revolution of 1688, the students remained loyal supporters of the Catholic King James. This was controversial in Rome due to the decision of the latter to seek refuge with Louis XIV of France, an enemy of the Pope.

=== 18th century ===
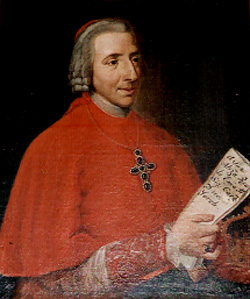
Henry Benedict Stuart, Cardinal Duke of York and great benefactor of the Scots College, from a painting in possession the Scots College.

William Leslie died in 1707, having seen in his lifetime the college transform into a main source of priests for the Mission. In the early eighteenth century the college enjoyed relative prosperity. In 1724, the administration was turned over to Italian Jesuits at the request of the Scottish clergy, due to their discontent with the administration. The college was not left unscathed by the Jansenist crisis which had an effect on the Scottish Church in the 1730s and 1740s. Happy years passed under the rector-ship of Lorenzo Alticozzi, who cleared the college debts, and then refurbished and enlarged the college villa at Marino. The villa was a place for the students and staff to recreate during the hot summer months. Notable students of this era included George Hay, John Geddes and Charles Erskine. Studies in philosophy and theology took place at the Roman College under the Jesuits. However, the Alticozzi era came to a dramatic end in 1766. Upon the death of the Old Pretender, the rectors of the British colleges in the city, with Cardinal York and others, chose to recognise Charles Edward Stuart as King Charles III. Papal policy instead was moving on from support of the exiled Stuarts, and veered toward acceptance of the Hanoverian succession. Therefore all the British Rectors, including Alticozzi, were removed from office and banished by Papal order.

In 1773, the Jesuit era came to an end abruptly when Clement XIV suppressed the society by his brief Dominus ac Redemptor. The administration was then passed to the Italian secular clergy. The college suffered in this period, with discipline failing and some administrators viewing it as a mere sinecure. Following visitation by Bishop Hay, John Thomson was sent as Scottish agent, and was eventually succeeded by Paul MacPherson upon the latter's death in 1792. MacPherson worked towards the college being handed over to Scottish superiors, however these efforts were interrupted by the French invasion of Rome in February 1798. The college was occupied by the French and MacPherson fled with the students, including those from the English and Irish Colleges who had been abandoned by their own superiors. The group of twenty-two arrived in London in June 1798 and were presented to the Prince of Wales and government ministers.

=== 19th–20th century ===
MacPherson returned in the summer of 1800 to recover the college properties, and found them in a state of disrepair. He was thereafter made Rector, albeit without any students. He remained in Rome throughout the quarrels between Pius VII and Napoleon, protecting the properties until he was expelled by the French in June 1811. He returned to Rome in 1812 where the defeat of Napoleon at Waterloo in 1815 had relieved some pressure. After much petitioning, students finally returned in 1820. MacPherson was eventually replaced as Rector in 1826 by Angus MacDonald, however MacDonald's death and subsequent crisis warranted the return of MacPherson in 1834. He died in 1846 and was succeeded by his vice-rector, Alexander Grant. Grant set about renovating the buildings, and began with the refurbishment of Sant'Andrea degli Scozzesi,which reopened on Saint Andrew's Day 1847. John Henry Newman sang the High Mass of dedication. In 1861, a total reconstruction of the college itself was made possible by compensation for the loss of the Scots Monastery in Ratisbon. Demolition of the buildings began in 1864, and the new building was completed in 1869, under the direction of Luigi Poletti. Busts of notable Scots Catholics can still be seen on the façade of the building, including the Cardinal Duke of York the last of the Stuarts. The building was solemnly inaugurated on Saint Andrew's Day, 1869.

In the first half of the 20th century, two rectors were named bishops; Robert Fraser, who had seen the institution through its tercentenary celebrations; and Donald Mackintosh who steered the college through the First World War. Mackintosh was succeeded by Father William Clapperton, who became another long term rector and significant figure in the college's history. In the early years of his rector-ship he rebuilt the college villa at Marino as well as seeking the improvement of formation by the addition of a spiritual director to the staff. He witnessed the rise of Benito Mussolini in Italy whose radical urban plans threatened the future of college building on the Via Quattro Fontane. When Italy entered the Second World War, Clapperton decided that staff and students should return home. Seminarians studying philosophy were sent to Blairs College while those in theology were transferred to St Peter's College, Bearsden. A temporary administrator kept Clapperton, who was on temporary posting in Banff, up to date with college affairs. Students and staff finally returned in 1946.

==== Via Cassia ====
In 1959, the Scottish Bishops decided to build a new college on the outskirts of the city and a location was chosen on the Via Cassia some 4 miles from the city centre. Clapperton did not wish to oversee the move given his age and long tenure, and was released from his office in 1960. He was named a Canon of St John Lateran and remained in Rome until his death in 1969. In 1962, the old college was vacated and the seminarians spent the interim years at the college villa in Marino. The new college was designed by Renato Costa and was officially opened by Pope Paul VI on 16 November 1964. The chapel of the new college was in the shape of an irregular heptagon completed with a high altar, an altar of Saint Andrew, Lady altar, choir stalls and pipe organ. Beneath the chapel there was a crypt, the main body of which was dedicated to Saint Margaret, with altarpiece by Arthur Fleischmann. In addition, there were altars of Saint Patrick, Saint Ninian and Saint Columba, each with their own mosaics. The original grave slabs of James Francis Edward Stuart, Charles Edward Stuart and Henry Benedict Stuart were fixed to the walls of the crypt. The stairways around the chapel and crypt were decorated with twenty stained glass windows created by Giovanni D'Aloisio. They depicted scenes from the history of the Church in Scotland. The subjects of these windows were suggested by Mgr. David McRoberts while Mgr. Charles Burns acted as historical adviser to the artists, and were accompanied by Latin inscriptions narrating the story of each scene. In 1984 Pope John Paul II visited the college and celebrated Mass in the chapel.

=== Recent History ===
Seminarians at the Pontifical Scots College in Rome spend their first two years studying Philosophy at the Angelicum. After completion of Philosophy, and depending on their fluency in Italian, they take up the study of theology either at the Pontifical Gregorian University or the Angelicum, where theology is also offered in English. Priests taking part in postgraduate theology courses continue to stay at the college. The celebration of the Feast of St Andrew is a high point of the Scots College year.

On 14 April 2016, the community of the Scots College were granted a private audience with Pope Francis at the Apostolic Palace to mark the 400th anniversary of its becoming a seminary. In 2017, seminarians from the college were invited to serve at the Easter Vigil at St. Peter's Basilica.

After a 2020 review projected unaffordable upgrade costs for the Via Cassia seminary, the Scottish Bishops announced a plan to relocate to a more central location in Rome beginning in 2021. In May 2023, a temporary move to the Beda College in September 2023 was announced, until a permanent location is found.

== Rectors ==
- Bernardino Paolini (1600–12)
- Patrick Anderson SJ (1615)
- Carlo Venozzi SJ (1615–19)
- Giovanni Antonio Marietti SJ (1619–22)
- George Elphinstone SJ (1622–44)
- William Christie SJ (1644–46)
- Francis Dempster SJ (1646–49; 1658–63)
- Andrew Leslie SJ (1649–52)
- Adam Gordon SJ (1652–55)
- Gilbert Talbot (alias George Bissett) SJ (1655–58; 1663–70)
- John Strachan SJ (1670–71)
- Ettore Carolo de Marini SJ (1671–74)
- William Aloysius Leslie SJ (1674–83; 1692–95)
- Andrew MacGhie SJ (1683–90)
- James Forbes SJ (1695–1701)
- Diego Calcagni SJ (1701–04)
- Giovanni Battista Naselli SJ (1704–08)
- Thomas Fyffe SJ (1708–12)
- William Clark SJ (1712–21)
- Alexander Ferguson SJ (1721–24)
- Luca Maria Gritta SJ (1724–29)
- Francesco Marini SJ (1729–31)
- Giovanni Maria Morici SJ (1731–38)
- Livio Benedetto Urbani SJ (1738–47)
- Lorenzo Alticozzi SJ (1747–66)
- Giovanni Battista Corsedoni SJ (1766–73)
- Vincenzo Massa (1773)
- Lorenzo Antonini (1773–74)
- Alessandro Marzi (1774–77)
- Ignazio Ceci (1777–81)
- Francesco Marchioni (1781–98)
- Paul MacPherson (1800–26; 1833–46)
- Angus MacDonald (1826–33)
- Alexander Grant DD (1846–78)
- James A. Campbell (1878–97)
- Robert Fraser DD (1897–1913)
- Donald Mackintosh (1913–22)
- William R. Clapperton (1922–60)
- Philip I. Flanagan PhD DD (1960–67)
- Daniel P. Boyle PSS MA (1967–73)
- Sean O'Kelly (1973–81)
- James Clancy PhL (1981–86)
- John Fitzsimmons PhL STL LSS (1986–89)
- John McIntyre STL MA (1989–95)
- Christopher J. McElroy STL (1995–2004)
- Philip Tartaglia STD (2004–05)
- Paul Milarvie (2005–09)
- John A. Hughes (2009–15)
- Daniel Fitzpatrick (2015–22)
- Mark J. Cassidy (2022–present)

== Alumni ==
The careers of some of the first students at the college demonstrate the opportunities available to educated Scottish Catholics on the continent in the 17th century. Former students Robert Phillip, later joined the French Oratory, and William Thomson, later a Franciscan, were confessors to Henrietta Maria of France. Another, George Strachan of the Mearns became a Humanist scholar, Orientalist and traveller. Daniel Colville became a notable linguist and librarian at El Escorial. George Conn, who arrived in 1619 and left in the same year, later became a Franciscan, canon of San Lorenzo in Damaso, secretary to Cardinal Francesco Barberini and honorary chamberlain of Pope Urban VIII. Conn also acted as papal agent at the court of Queen Henrietta Maria. Thomas Chalmers, a student from 1630 to 1637, was almoner to Cardinals Richelieu and Mazarin.

The college also produced many notable missionaries for Scotland. William Ballantine, student from 1641–46, was named the first Prefect of the Scottish Mission in 1653 and was imprisoned in London for two years by order of Oliver Cromwell. Ballantine was later succeeded by another former student of the college, Alexander Dunbar Winchester. During the fabricated Popish Plot, which gripped the kingdoms of England and Scotland, Alexander Lumsden, a former student of the college and Dominican Friar, was condemned to death in London. He was later acquitted on the grounds of his nationality and could not be said to have "acted as a priest in England" within the meaning of the Jesuits, etc. Act 1584. John Paul Jameson (c. 1659–1700) was a priest and antiquarian who studied at the college in the latter half of the seventeenth century.

Charles Erskine was educated at the college under the protection of Henry Benedict Stuart from 1748 until 1753. Erskine became a papal diplomat and was named Cardinal in 1801. Walter Lovi (1796–1878) was a priest and architect active in the mid-nineteenth century who studied at the college from 1823 until 1825.

In the late nineteenth and twentieth centuries there were several notable students. Frederick Rolfe (1860–1913), better known as Baron Corvo; a writer, artist, photographer and eccentric, was expelled from the college without receiving ordination. Canon John Gray (1866–1934), English poet and founding parish priest of St Peter's Morningside Edinburgh, studied at the college from 1898 until 1901. Adrian Fortescue (1874–1923), priest and polymath, studied at the college from 1891 until 1894. George Thompson (1928–2016) entered the college in the 1950s and left without completing his studies. He later became a teacher and then a Scottish National Party politician and Member of Parliament. Later he resumed studies for the priesthood at St John's Seminary, Wonersh and was ordained in 1989. Paul Laverty (born 1957), a screenwriter and lawyer, studied for priesthood but did not continue to ordination and obtained a degree in philosophy from the Pontifical Gregorian University.

== See also ==
- Sant'Andrea degli Scozzesi
- Royal Scots College, Salamanca
- Scots College, Paris
- Scots College, Douai
- English College, Rome
- List of Jesuit sites
