= John Paul Jameson =

John Paul Jameson (Jamieson) D.D. (c. 1659 - 20 March 1700) was a Scottish Roman Catholic priest and antiquarian.

== Life ==
Jameson was born at Aberdeen, was brought up a Protestant, but became a Roman Catholic convert. He entered the Scots College at Rome on 10 April 1678 and was ordained priest on 9 May 1685. He was nominated to the chair of divinity in the seminary of Cardinal Gregorio Barbarigo, Bishop of Padua; but he shortly returned to Rome, where he lived until 1687.

Jameson was sent back on the mission in 1687, when all the Scottish priests abroad were required by special orders from James II and VII to return to their native country. He was stationed first at Huntly, began a new mission at Elgin in 1688, and died at Edinburgh on 25 March 1700 aged 41.

== Scholar ==
During his residence in Rome Jameson transcribed, in the Vatican and elsewhere, original documents for a planned History of Scotland, not completed. Some of these documents he left to Robert Strachan, missionary at Aberdeen, and the remainder were deposited in the Scots College at Paris. According to William Nicolson's Scottish Historical Library, Jameson took from Rome copies of many bulls and briefs, made extracts of the consistorial proceedings of the Church of Scotland from 1494 to the Protestant Reformation. He wrote critical notes on John Spotiswood's History and on the printed Chronicle of Melros, made remarks on Reliquiæ Divi Andreæ by George Martine, and compiled a Chartulary of the Church of Aberdeen. He discovered in the Christina, Queen of Sweden's library at Rome the original manuscript of the History of Kinloss by Joannes Ferrerius, and circulated his transcript of the work to Scottish scholars.

== Notes ==
Attribution

This article incorporates text from a publication now in the public domain: Lee, Sidney, ed. (1892). "Jamieson, John Paul". Dictionary of National Biography. Vol. 29. London: Smith, Elder & Co.
