= Patrick Anderson (Jesuit) =

Patrick Anderson SJ (1575 – 24 September 1624) was a Scottish Jesuit, known as a missioner, college head, and author.

== Life ==
Anderson was a native of Elgin or Moray, his mother being a sister of John Lesley. After a basic education at Elgin grammar school, and a course of classical study at the University of Edinburgh, he entered the Society of Jesus at Rome in 1597.

In time Anderson acquired a reputation as linguist, mathematician, philosopher, and divine. Sent to Scotland as a missioner, he arrived via London where he was in November 1609. He had hairbreadth escapes from the authorities. He left Scotland for Paris to meet his superior, James Gordon, late in 1611; at that time there was only a single Catholic priest in Scotland. Anderson gathered nearly a hundred young Scots as candidates for the priesthood, and in 1615 he became the first Jesuit rector of the Scots College in Rome.

Returning to Scotland, Anderson was betrayed, and committed to the Old Tolbooth, Edinburgh. During his confinement there he held several disputations with Presbyterian divines. Threatened with the torture of the boot, he was liberated by the intercession, it was thought, of the French ambassador Antoine Coiffier-Ruzé, marquis d'Effiat, who chose him for his confessor. He died in London 24 September 1624.

== Works ==
Anderson's works are:

- The Grovnd of the Catholike and Roman Religion in the Word of God. With the Antiquity and Continuance therof, throughout all Kingdomes and Ages. Collected out of diuers Conferences, Discourses, and Disputes, which M. Patricke Anderson, of the Society of Iesvs, had at seuerall tymes with sundry Bishops and Ministers of Scotland, at his last imprisonment in Edenburgh, for the Catholike Faith, in the yeares of our Lord 1620 and 1621. Sent vnto an Honourable Personage by the Compyler and Prisoner himselfe. 3 parts or vols. 1623.
- Memoirs of the Scotch Saints, manuscript formerly preserved in the Scotch College at Paris.

Augustin de Backer mentioned, in his list of Anderson's works, Copia de las Cartas que se embiaron de Escocia a nuestro Padre Claudio Aquaviva, Preposito general de la Compañia de Jesus, por un Padre de Escocia, de la misma Compañia a quatro de Enero del año 1612. Por este relacion se puede ver el estado bueno de las cosas de la Christianidad de Escocia, fol. 10 ff. De Escocia, á quatro de Enero, 1612. De V. P. hijo, y siervo indigno Patricio Andersono.
