= St Andrew's Church, Rome =

St Andrew's Church
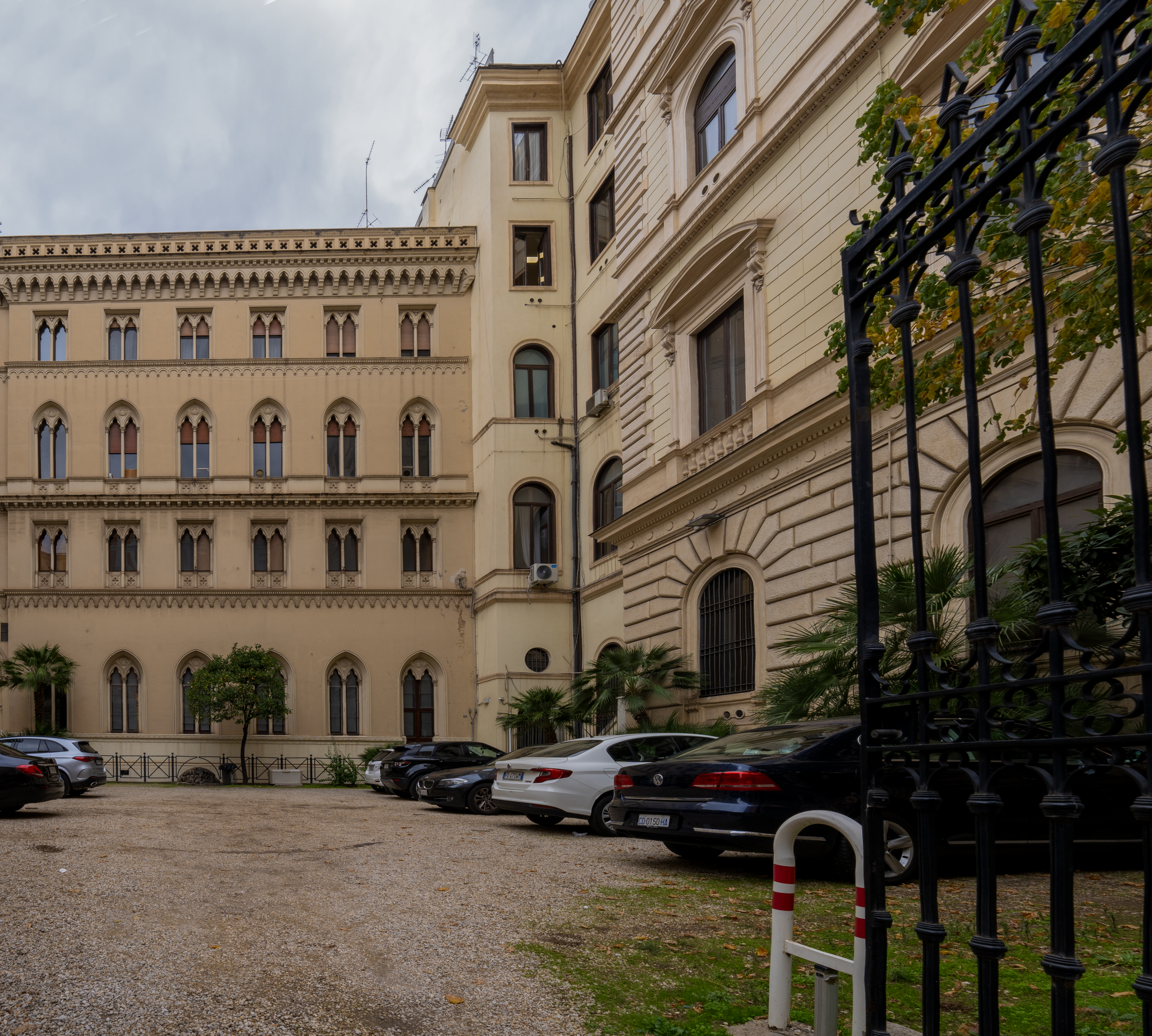
- Façade and courtyard
- Click on the map for a fullscreen view
- 41°54′11″N 12°29′30″E
- Location: Rome
- Country: Italy
- Denomination: Church of Scotland

Architecture
- Architectural type: Church
- Completed: 1885

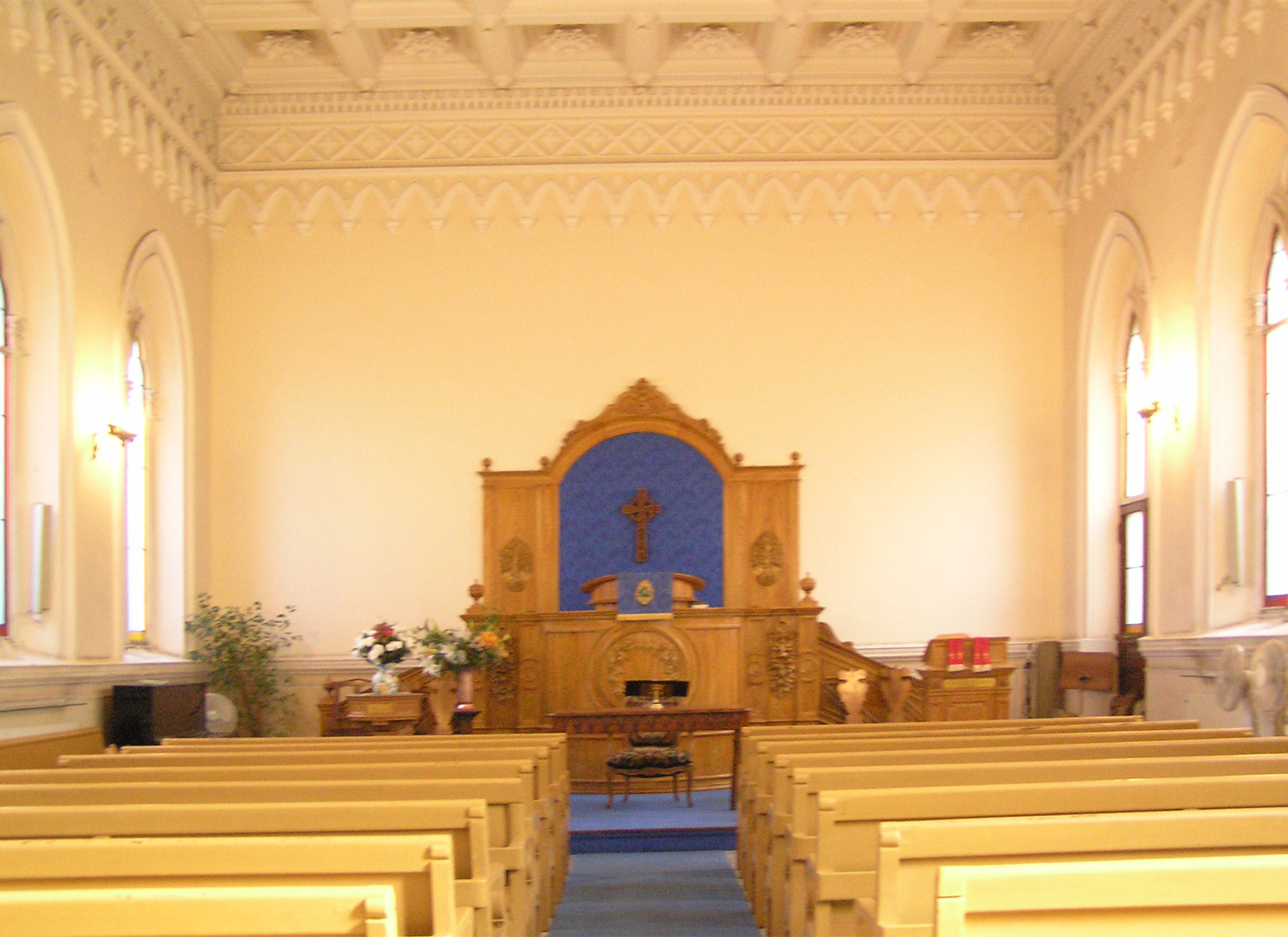
St Andrew's, Rome: interior, showing central pulpit

St Andrew's Church is a congregation of the Church of Scotland in Rome, Italy, belonging to the Church's International Presbytery. Services take place every Sunday at 11:00 a.m. in Via XX Settembre, 7 00187 Rome. Rev Tara Curlewis is minister at St Andrew's and Liaison Officer for the Reformed Ecumenical Office in Rome.

== History ==
The congregation began in the early 1860s with a small group of Scots and American Presbyterians who met in the neighbourhood of the Spanish Steps. A first building was opened in 1871 near the Porta Flaminia. The present building, about halfway between the Piazza della Repubblica and the Palazzo del Quirinale, was opened in early 1885.

The Italian military intelligence previously occupied the second and third floors.

== Description ==
Planning permission was granted only on condition that the building should not look like a church from the outside. Thus the architecture is similar to that of the various Italian government ministries on the same street. The building is set back a little from the street, with an enclosed forecourt, and is constructed on four levels. The church itself takes up the whole of the ground floor; above this are offices, a manse, and a broad roof terrace with views over Vatican City.

The interior architecture of the church reflects Presbyterian tradition, with a central pulpit and minimal decoration. Movable pews enable the space to be used flexibly, often for concerts as well as for worship. A memorial to Scottish servicemen lost in the Italian campaign has a prominent position.

The St Andrew's congregation comes from all over the world. Worship is held in English but many languages are spoken by members. Music and fellowship play an important role in the life of the congregation, which is known for its warm welcome to those living in Rome and to those simply passing through.

== See also ==
- Sant'Andrea degli Scozzesi
- List of Church of Scotland parishes
- All Saints' Church, Rome (Anglican)
