= Jean d'Arces =

Jean d'Arces (1370s–1454) (called the Cardinal of Tarentaise) was a French Roman Catholic bishop and cardinal.

== Biography ==
Jean d'Arces was born in Montiers, the son of a noble family. He became a licentiate in canon law. After serving as prior of the Saint-Valentin monastery in Bissy, Savoy, he succeeded his uncle Hugues d'Arces as prior of the Great St Bernard Hospice, holding that position from 1419 to 1438.

On February 28, 1438, he was elected Archbishop of Tarentaise, a post he held until his death. He took part in the Council of Florence (1431–45) as the representative of Cardinal Louis Aleman. While there, he participated in the papal conclave of November 5, 1439, where he supported the election of Antipope Felix V.

Antipope Felix V created him a pseudocardinal in Geneva on April 6, 1444, awarding him the titular church of Santi Nereo e Achilleo. He later submitted to Pope Nicholas V and was absolved for having supported Felix. Pope Nicholas V made him a cardinal in the consistory of December 19, 1449, confirming his possession of Santi Nereo e Achilleo the next day.

He died in Montiers on December 12, 1454. He is buried in Montiers.
