= John Fitzsimmons =

British priest and radio presenter

The Reverend John Fitzsimmons (2 December 1939, in Paisley – 17 May 2008, in Gourock) was a Scottish Roman Catholic priest and radio presenter who presented The Greetings radio program on BBC Radio Scotland for many years.

John Fitzsimmons was born in Paisley, Renfrewshire, in 1939. He was ordained priest of the Diocese of Paisley in Rome in 1963. During his studies he earned degrees in philosophy (Ph.L), sacred theology (STL) and sacred scripture (LSS). Involved in broadcasting for more than 40 years, he had also served as the rector of the Pontifical Scots College in Rome. In addition to his work at BBC Scotland, Fitzsimmons was known for his sometimes controversial criticisms of the Catholic Church hierarchy.

After a long illness, John Fitzsimmons died in his sixty ninth year on 17 May 2008, in Gourock. Maggie Cunningham, the director of programmes for BBC Scotland, said of Fitzsimmons, "He was a big man with a big personality, erudite and compassionate, and anybody who met or worked with Father John would benefit from his life-enhancing qualities."
