= Santi Nereo e Achilleo =

Santi Nereo ed Achilleo
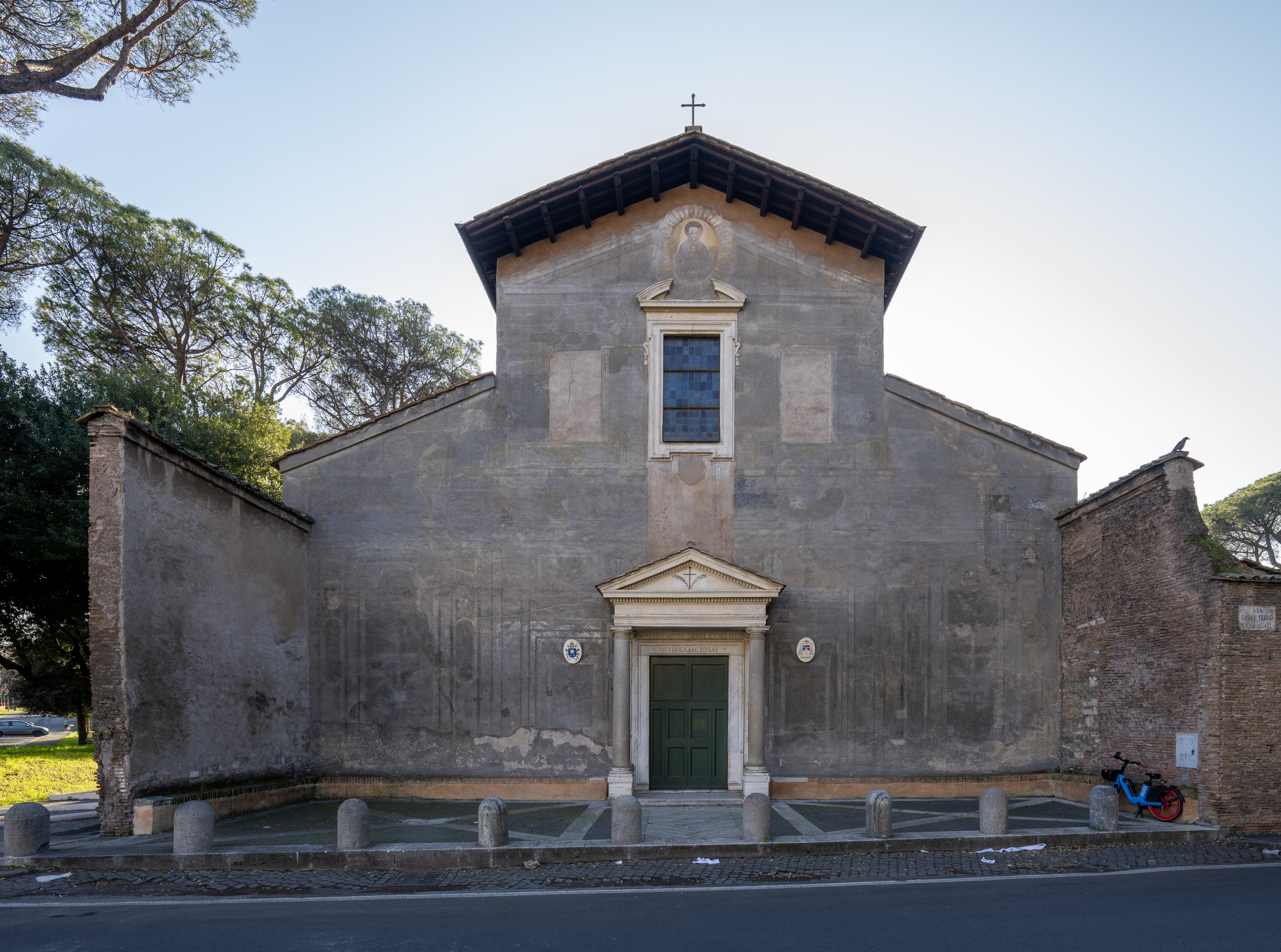
- Façade of the basilica of Santi Nereo ed Achilleo
- Click on the map for a fullscreen view
- 41.8802°N 12.4948°E
- Location: 28 Via delle Terme di Caracalla, Rome
- Country: Italy
- Denomination: Catholic
- Religious institute: Oratorians

History
- Status: Titular church
- Dedication: Saints Nereus and Achilleus

Santi Nereo ed Achilleo is a fourth-century basilica church in Rome, Italy, located in via delle Terme di Caracalla in the rione Celio facing the main entrance to the Baths of Caracalla. It has been the titular church of Cardinal Celestino Aós Braco since 28 November 2020. Unusually it is part of a detached portion of the parish of Chiesa Nuova rather than the local geographical parish of San Saba and is served by Oratorians as a satellite of the Roman Oratory.

The underground basilica church at the Catacombs of Domitilla on the Appian Way, virtually lost in the early Middle Ages and rediscovered in the 1870s by the archaeologist Giovanni Battista de Rossi, carries the same dedication to Nereo and Achilleo.

== History ==
A 337 epitaph inscription in the Basilica di San Paolo fuori le Mura celebrates the late Cinnamius Opas, lector of a church known as Titulus Fasciolae; the name has traditionally been explained as the place where St. Peter lost the foot bandage (fasciola) that wrapped the wounds caused by his chains, on his way to escape the Mamertine Prison. In the acts of the synod of Pope Symmachus, in 499, the Titulus Fasciolae is recorded as served by five priests. This same building is recorded as titulus Sanctorum Nerei et Achillei in 595; therefore the dedications to Saints Nereus and Achilleus, two soldiers and martyrs of the 4th century, must date to the sixth century.

In 814, Pope Leo III rebuilt the old titulus. In the 13th century the relics of the two martyrs were transferred from the Catacomb of Domitilla to the Sant'Adriano, whence they were transferred to this church by Cardinal Baronius.

The church structure fell into near ruin over the centuries, and in 1320, according to the Catalogue of Turin, it was a presbyterial title with no priest serving. So Pope Sixtus IV restored the church in occasion of the Jubilee of 1475, while the Jubilee of 1600 was the occasion for the last major restoration, funded by the scholarly antiquarian Cardinal Cesare Baronio, who commissioned the frescoes.

== Interior ==
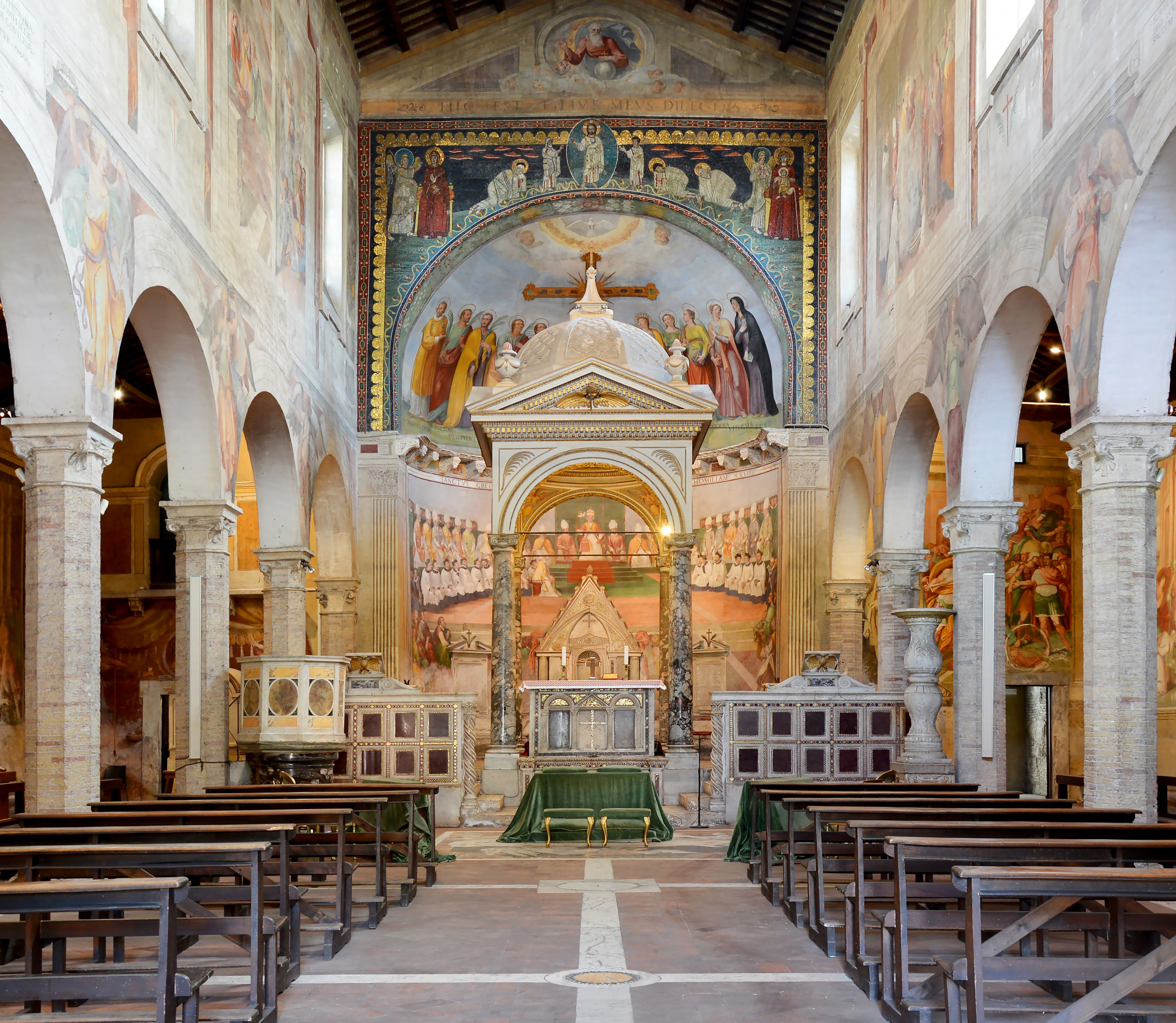
The nave and altar

Behind its unassuming facade the church is built according to the typical basilica plan, with a single nave and two side aisles. The original columns were replaced in the 15th century by octagonal pillars, and the nave is characterized by the large fresco decorations commissioned by Cardinal Baronio.

The cardinal in his iconographic scheme timed for the 1600 Jubilee emphasized the role of the Roman martyrs during the early centuries of Christianity. The execution of the frescoes was entrusted to a minor painter, generally thought to be Niccolò Circignani, called "Pomarancio". The bright frescoes often depict violent martyrdom scenes.

The medieval ambo is set on a large, porphyry urn taken from the nearby Baths of Caracalla. The low screen separating the choir is faced with 13th-century Cosmatesque style inlays. A white marble candelabra has been brought here from San Paolo fuori le Mura. The ciborium, dating to the 16th century, is raised on African marble columns.

The spandrels of the arch at the end of the nave retains some of the former mosaics of the time of Leo III, with a central Transfiguration in a mandorla. The high altar, made of three Cosmatesque panels, houses the relics of Nereus, Achilleus, and of St Flavia Domitilla; all three of them were brought here from the Catacomb of Domitilla. Next to the altar there are two pagan stones depicting two winged spirits, taken from a nearby temple.

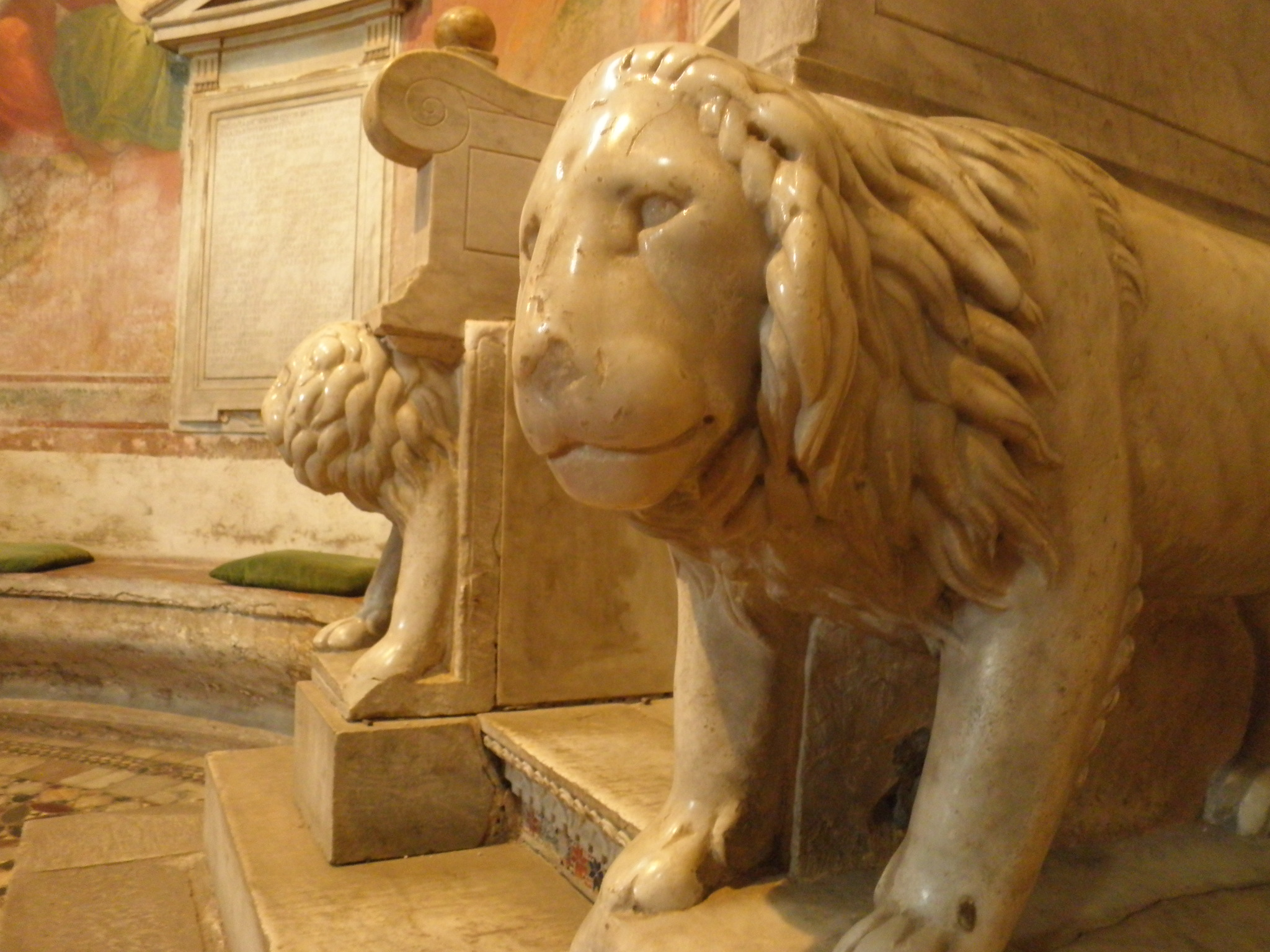
Lions of the episcopal throne

In the apse behind the altar is the episcopal throne assembled under the direction of the antiquary Cardinal Baronius, reusing lions, in the Cosmatesque style that is associated with the Vassalletto school, which support the armrests; on the backrest is inscribed the opening and closing words of the twenty-eighth homily of St. Gregory the Great, inscribed under the mistaken tradition that he preached them here, in front of the relics of Sts. Nereus and Achilleus on their feast day. When Cardinal Baronio ordered the inscription, he did not know that the relics were originally buried in the underground basilica of the Catacomb of Domitilla, so thought that this was the place St Gregory preached.

The arch of the apse has mosaics of the 9th century with the Annunciation, the Transfiguration, and the Theotokos (Madonna and child).

== List of the Cardinal Priests of Saints Nereus and Achilles ==
The following Cardinals were Cardinal Priests of Santi Nereo ed Achillei:

- Berengar Fredol the Elder (1305–1309)
- Berengar Fredol the Younger (1312–1317)
- Pierre Roger de Beaufort-Turenne OSB (1338–1342), then Pope Clement VI.
- Thomas of Frignano OFM (1378–1381)
- Pierre de Murat de Cros OSB (1383–1388), Pseudocardinal of Antipope Clemens VII.
- Philip Repyngdon CRSA (1408–1434)
- Giovanni Berardi (1440–1444)
- Bernard de La Planche (Planca) (1440–1446), Pseudocardinal of Antipope Felix V.
- Jean d'Arces (1449–1454), Pseudocardinal of Antipope Felix V.
- vacant (1454–1460)
- Burkhard von Weißpriach (1460–1462)
- vacant (1462–1467)
- Stephen Várdai (1467–1471)
- Giovanni Arcimboldo (1473–1476)
- Giovanni Battista Mellini (1476–1478)
- Cosma Orsini (1480–1481)
- Giovanni de Conti (1483–1489)
- Maffeo Gherardi OSBCam (1492) [uncertain delivery] (Cardinal Deacon)
- vacant (1489–1492 or 1489–1493)
- Giovanni Antonio Sangiorgio (1493–1503)
- Juan de Zúñiga y Pimentel (1503–1504)
- Francesco Alidosi (1505–1506)
- Francisco de Borja (1506–1511)
- vacant (1511–1517)
- Bonifacio Ferrero (1517–1533)
- Reginald Pole (1537–1540) (Cardinaldeacon)
- Enrique de Borja y Aragón (1540) (Cardinal Deacon)
- Roberto Pucci (1542–1544)
- Francesco Sfondrati (1545–1547)
- vacant (1547–1556)
- Juan Martínez Silíceo (1556–1557)
- Jean Bertrand (1557–1560)
- Luigi d'Este (1562–1563) (Cardinal Deacon)
- Gabriele Paleotti (1565) (Cardinal Deacon)
- Giovanni Francesco Morosini (1588–1590)
- vacant (1590–1596)
- Cesare Baronio (1596–1607)
- Innocenzo del Bufalo (1607–1610)
- Pier Paolo Crescenzi (1611–1629)
- Antonio Santacroce (1630–1641)
- Marcantonio Bragadin (1642–1646)
- Cristoforo Vidman Cardinal-deacon (1647–1657)
- Baccio Aldobrandini (1658–1665)
- Neri Corsini senior (1666–1678)
- Flaminio Taja (1681–1682)
- vacant (1682–1686)
- Girolamo Casanate (1686–1689)
- Leandro Colloredo CO (1689–1705)
- Alessandro Caprara (1706–1711)
- Benedetto Odescalchi-Erba (1715–1725)
- Nicola Gaetano Spinola (1725–1735)
- vacant (1735–1739)
- Pierre Guérin de Tencin (1739–1758)
- Nicolò Maria Antonelli (1759–1767)
- Lazzaro Opizio Pallavicino (1768–1778)
- vacant (1778–1782)
- Franziskus Herzan von Harras (1782–1788)
- Luigi Valenti Gonzaga (1790–1795)
- Ippolito Antonio Vincenti Mareri (1795–1807)
- vacant (1807–1816)
- Carlo Andrea Pelagallo (1816–1822)
- Gianfrancesco Falzacappa (1823)
- vacant (1823–1829)
- Pietro Caprano (1829–1834)
- Giacomo Monico (1834–1851)
- François-Nicholas-Madeleine Morlot (1853–1862)
- Giuseppe Luigi Trevisanato (1864–1877)
- Inácio do Nascimento Morais Cardoso (1877–1883)
- Alfonso Capecelatro CO (1885–1886)
- Gaspard Mermillod (1890–1892)
- Luigi Galimberti (1893–1896)
- Antonio Agliardi (1896–1899)
- Agostino Gaetano Riboldi (1901–1902)
- Anton Hubert Fischer (1903–1912)
- vacant (1912–1916)
- Pietro La Fontaine (1916–1921)
- Dennis Joseph Dougherty (1921–1951)
- Celso Costantini (1953–1958)
- William Godfrey (1958–1963)
- Thomas Cooray OMI (1965–1988)
- Bernardino Echeverría Ruiz OFM (1994–2000)
- Theodore Edgar McCarrick (2001–2018)
- Celestino Aós Braco OFM.Cap (since 2020)

== See also ==
- Pierfrancesco Scarampi (tomb)

== Sources ==
- Forcella, Vincenzo (1877). Inscrizioni delle chiese e d'altri edifici di Roma. (in Italian) (in Latin) Volume XI. Roma: Ludovico Cecchini. Pp. 421-424.
- Roma, collection "L'Italia", Touring Editore, 2004, Milano.

| Preceded by San Martino ai Monti | Landmarks of Rome; Santi Nereo e Achilleo | Succeeded by San Nicola in Carcere |
