= Charles Erskine (cardinal) =

Italian-Scottish papal diplomat and cardinal

His Eminence Charles Erskine
- Cardinal-Deacon of Santa Maria in Portico
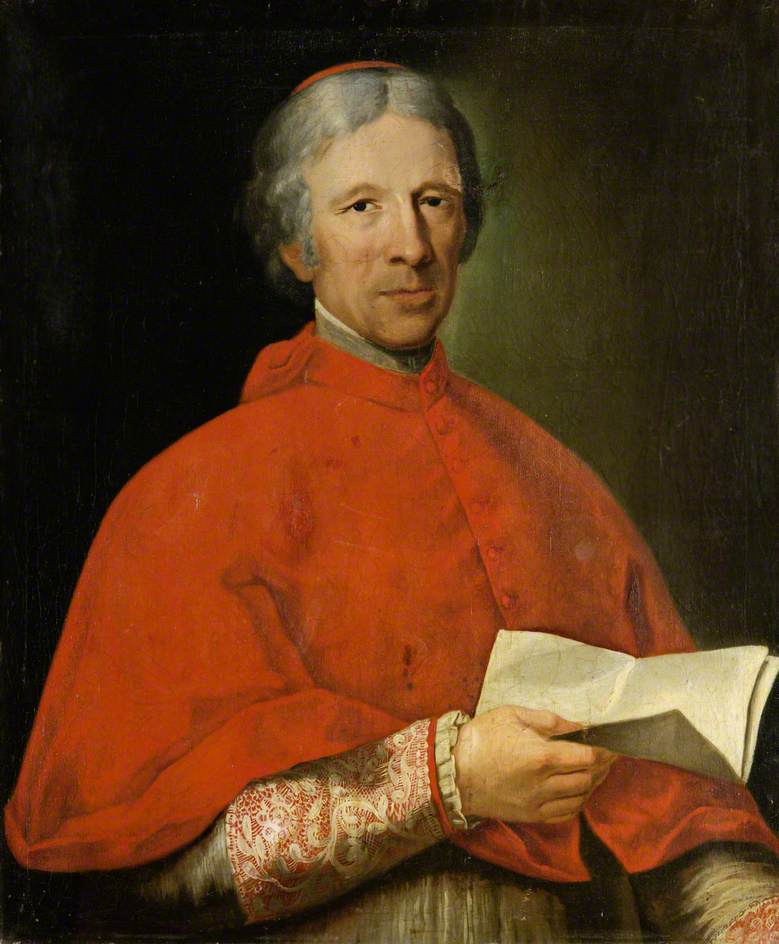
- Church: Roman Catholic Church
- Installed: 28 March 1803
- Term ended: 20 March 1811
- Predecessor: Filippo Carandini
- Successor: Stanislao Sanseverino

Orders
- Ordination: 28 August 1783 (Subdeacon); 22 January 1804 (Deacon)
- Created cardinal: 23 February 1801 by Pope Pius VII
- Rank: Cardinal-Deacon

Personal details
- Born: 13 February 1739 Rome, Papal States
- Died: 20 March 1811 (aged 72) Paris, French Empire
- Buried: Panthéon
- Parents: Colin Erskine
- Education: Pontifical Scots College

Charles Erskine (13 February 1739 – 20 March 1811) was an Italian-Scottish papal diplomat and cardinal.

== Biography ==
He was the son of Colin Erskine, youngest son to Alexander Erskine of Cambo and maternal grandson of Alexander Erskine, 3rd Earl of Kellie, by his marriage to Agatha Gigli of the noble family of Gigli of Anagni. He was educated by Cardinal Henry, Duke of York, his 7th cousin 1x removed, at the Scots College, Rome, and was afterwards a successful advocate, becoming a Doctor of Laws in 1770.

Pope Pius VI made him pro (pro tem)-Auditor and Promoter of the Faith in 1782, also a domestic prelate, canon of St. Peter's Basilica, and Dean of the college of consistorial advocates. He was installed as a subdeacon on 28 August 1783.

In October 1793, Erskine was sent as papal envoy to Great Britain. By his tact Erskine established excellent relations with the Court of St. James and the ministry, diminished the dissensions among Catholics, and avoided stirring up any anti-Catholic demonstration against himself. During his stay in London the pope named him a full auditor, and in 1795 gave him additional powers as envoy extraordinary. He left London in 1801 and returned to Rome, where in 1803, he was installed as a Cardinal Deacon, it being revealed that he had been elevated to this office in pectore in the Consistory of February 1801. He was then assigned the Church of Santa Maria in Campitelli as his titular church. As a member of the Sacred Congregation of Propaganda Fide, he was still useful to English Catholics, and was made Cardinal Protector of Scotland. He was ordained a deacon the following January.

On the French invasion of Rome in 1808, Erskine was made pro-Secretary of Briefs, and was confined in the Quirinal with the pope. When Pope Pius VII was taken prisoner Erskine was allowed to go free, but his property was now lost and he would have been reduced to poverty if his Protestant relations in Scotland had not granted him an allowance. In 1809, Napoleon ordered him to Paris and though ill he was forced from Rome in January 1810.

Shortly after his arrival in Paris, Erskine fell into a gradual decline and soon died. He was buried in the Church of Saint-Genevieve, now the Panthéon.
