= Sant'Andrea degli Scozzesi =

Saint Andrew of the Scots
- Chiesa di Sant'Andrea degli Scozzesi
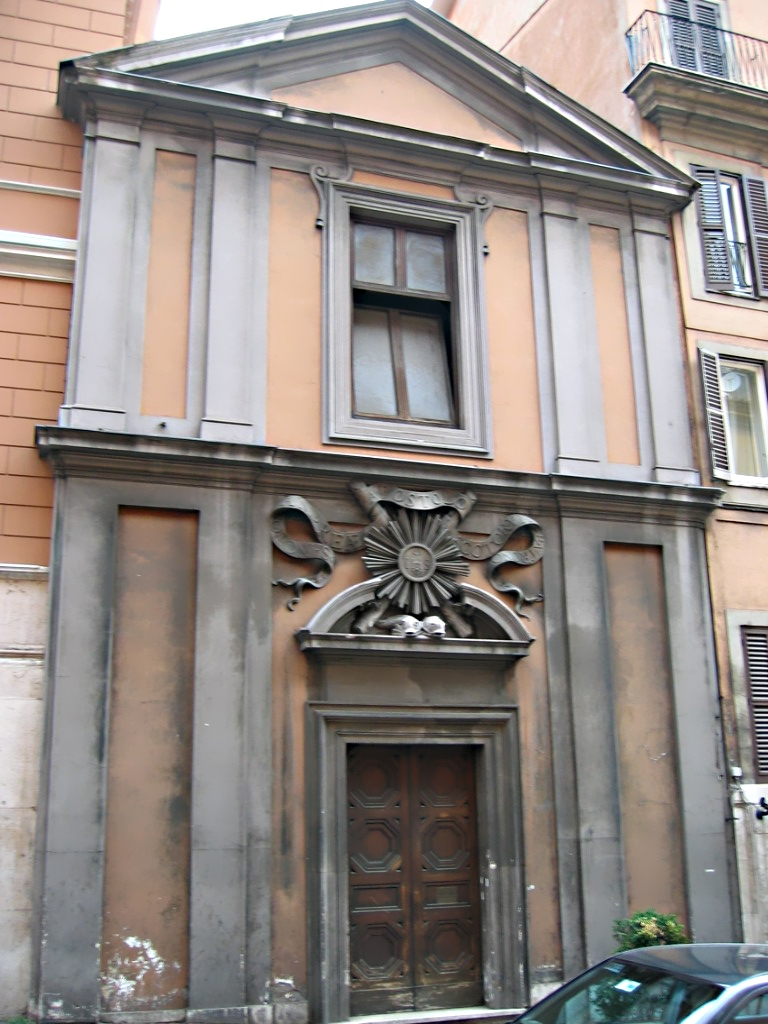
- Saint Andrew of the Scots
- Location: Rome
- Address: Via delle Quattro Fontane, 171
- Country: Italy
- Denomination: Catholic

History
- Status: Former National Church
- Founded: 1592
- Dedication: Saint Andrew the Apostle

Architecture
- Functional status: deconsecrated
- Style: Baroque
- Years built: 1640s
- Closed: 2004

Sant' Andrea degli Scozzesi (English: St Andrew of the Scots) is a 17th century former Catholic church in Rome, near Piazza Barberini on Via delle Quattro Fontane. Once a haven for Scottish Catholics in Rome and chapel of the Pontifical Scots College, it was deconsecrated in 2004 and still stands.

== History ==
The Scottish National Church had been Sant'Andrea delle Fratte until the Reformation, when in 1585 Pope Sixtus V assigned it to the Minim friars of Saint Francis of Paola. In around 1592 Pope Clement VIII purchased the palace of Florentine Cosmo in order to build the church of S. Andrea e S. Margherita regina. In addition, the Pope founded a college and hospice constructed for the Scottish expatriate community in Rome fleeing religious persecution, especially for those intended for priesthood. In 1604, these institutions were relocated to the Via Felice (now the Via delle Quattro Fontane). In 1615, Pope Paul V gave the hospice and the Scots College to the Jesuits. The rebuilding of the church itself was completed by 1646, aside from decoration, and was formally dedicated to Saint Andrew alone. One side altar was dedicated to Saint Margaret.

At the Suppression of the Society of Jesus in 1773, the church came under the administration of the Italian secular clergy and was closed during the French occupation of Rome in the late 18th century. In 1820, activity resumed at the college under the charge of Scottish secular clergy. During the absence of the Scots the church had become occupied by a Roman confraternity who refused to leave. The confraternity finally vacated the church building in September 1847 upon petition by the college to Pope Pius IX. Following renovations, the church was formally reopened in 1847 on Saint Andrew's Day, high Mass being sung by John Henry Newman, now saint and doctor of the church.

The adjacent college was reconstructed in 1869 by Luigi Poletti. In 1959 Queen Elizabeth The Queen Mother visited the church. The college was abandoned in 1962 for more suitable premises and was incorporated into a bank (Cassa di Risparmio delle Province Lombarde), and later into the Roman office of the ADVANT NCTM law firm. A proviso was made that the church would remain accessible to staff and students of the Scots College. However, the church was formally deconsecrated by decree of the Cardinal Vicar of Rome on 1 June 2004.

== Interior ==
The simple two-storied Baroque façade is only decorated with the cross and two fishes of Saint Andrew, the patron saint of Scotland, and the inscription Sancto Andreae Apostolo Scotorum Patrono (To St Andrew, Apostle [and] Patron of the Scots). The façade of the adjacent former Scottish Seminary is still decorated with the coat of arms and motto of the country in addition to busts of notable Scottish Catholics.

The church is aisleless with two side chapels and barrel-vaulted ceiling. On the right wall immediately inside the main entrance is a white marble monument to John Stewart, only son of Sir James Stewart, Bt., (called "Earl of Bute") by his second wife Christian Dundas. In the centre of the ceiling is a 16th-century fresco of St Andrew in Glory by Guillaume Courtois. The high altar was made in the 17th century and the altarpiece from the 18th century was by Scottish painter Gavin Hamilton, and depicted the Martyrdom of St Andrew. On both sides of the sanctuary there are hinged grates covering openings into tribunes where members of the exiled royal family would sit when they attended Mass. There was also an Enthroned Madonna with Sts Columba and Ninian by Alexander Maximilian Seitz. The interior of the church was left intact from 1962 until 2004 when the removable art works from the church were taken to the new Scots college on the Via Cassia.

== See also ==
- Pontifical Scots College, Rome
- St Andrew's Church, Rome (Church of Scotland)
