= George Martine (historian) =

Scottish historian

George Martine, the elder (1635–1712) was a Scottish historian of St. Andrews.

== Life ==
Born 5 August 1635, he was eldest son of James Martine (1615–1684), a minister of the Church of Scotland in Fifeshire; his mother—his father's first wife—was Janet Robinson, who died 13 September 1644, and his grandfather was Dr. George Martine, principal of St. Salvator's College, St. Andrews. Martine became commissary clerk of St. Andrews in August 1666, and held the office until August 1690. Then he was deprived as a Jacobite non-juror, refusing to pledge himself to William III and Mary II.

Martine was secretary and companion to Archbishop James Sharp, who died in 1679. He succeeded his father in land at St. Andrews, in 1696, and died 26 August 1712. He was called "Martine of Clermont", after land he acquired in 1668 (also Cleremont, Claremont).

== Works ==
Martine is known for the diocesan history Reliquiæ divi Andreæ, or the State of the Venerable See of St. Andrews (St. Andrews, 1797). This work, written in 1683, was printed from a manuscript copy in the possession of a descendant. The antiquarian John Paul Jameson had early access to the work, which was edited and published by John Rotheram.

Selections from a memorandum-book of household and travelling expenses with Sharp were printed by the Maitland Club (Miscellany, ii. 497).

== Family ==
In June 1668 Martine married Catherine, eldest daughter of James Winchester of Kinglassie, Fifeshire, by whom he had several children including the physician George Martine, the younger.

== Notes ==
Attribution

This article incorporates text from a publication now in the public domain: Lee, Sidney, ed. (1893). "Martine, George (1635-1712)". Dictionary of National Biography. Vol. 36. London: Smith, Elder & Co.
