= Cornelio Bentivoglio =

Italian nobleman and cardinal

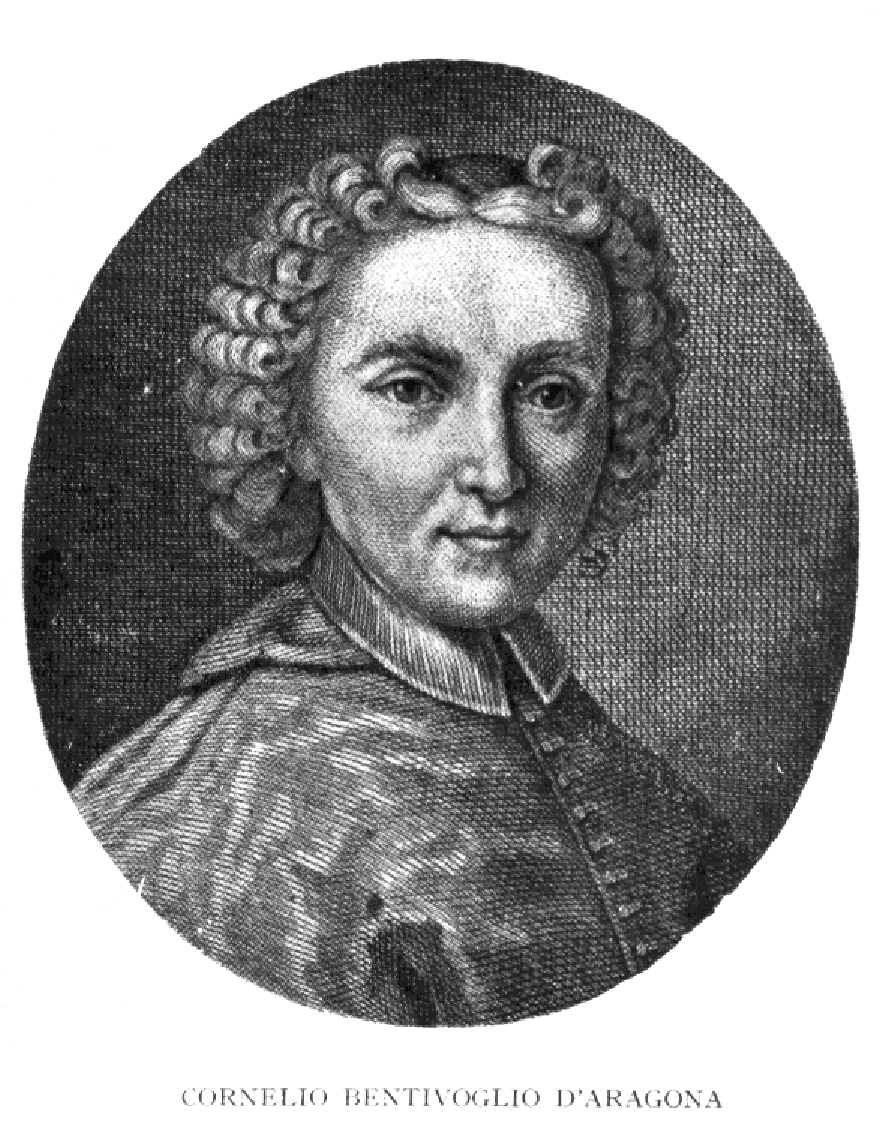
Cornelio Bentivoglio.

Cornelio Bentivoglio (27 March 1668 – 30 December 1732 in Ferrara) was an Italian nobleman and cardinal.

He was born at Ferrara to the powerful Bentivoglio family, and was a relative of the cardinal Guido Bentivoglio (1579 – 1644). Cornelio went to Rome at an early age and was appointed Archbishop of Carthage.

In 1712, he was appointed nuncio to Paris. He locked horns with the Jansenists, led by Pasquier Quesnel in Paris, and was recalled after the death of Louis XIV in 1715. He became cardinal in 1719, and named legate for the province of Romagna until 1726. He was then named Spanish Minister Plenipotentiary at Rome, a position which he held until his death. He is buried in the church of Santa Cecilia in Trastevere.
