= George Martine (physician) =

Scottish physician (1700–1741)

George Martine, the younger (1700–1741) was a Scottish physician.

== Life ==
Born in Scotland in 1700, he was the son of the historian George Martine. He was educated at the University of St. Andrews, where during Jacobite rebellion of 1715, he headed a riot of some students of the college, who rang the college bells on the day that the Old Pretender was proclaimed. He later studied medicine, first at the University of Edinburgh (1720), and then at the University of Leyden, graduating M.D. there in 1725. He then returned to Scotland and settled in practice at St. Andrews.

In October 1740 Martine accompanied Charles Cathcart, 8th Lord Cathcart, as physician to the forces on the British expedition during the War of Jenkins' Ear, to attack the Spanish possessions in America. After the death of Lord Cathcart, on Dominica, 20 December 1740, he was attached as first physician to the expedition against Cartagena under Edward Vernon (see Battle of Cartagena de Indias). While there he contracted a "bilious fever", of which he died in 1741. He had been elected a Fellow of the Royal Society in his absence.

== Works ==
Martine wrote:

- De Similibus Animalibus et de Animalibus Calore libri duo, London, 1740.
- Essays Medical and Philosophical, London, 1740, a collection of six essays; of those, Essays and Observations on the Construction and Graduation of Thermometers, and An Essay towards a Natural and Experimental History of the Various Degrees of Heat in Bodies, were reissued together as a second edition, Edinburgh, in 1772, and again in 1792.
- In B. Eustachii Tabulas Anatomicas Commentarii, published by Dr. Monro, Edinburgh, 1755.

He also contributed papers on medical subjects to the Edinburgh Medical Essays and the Philosophical Transactions.

The Examination of the Newtonian Argument for the Emptiness of Space London, 1740, was also by Martine. It led him into controversy with Colin Maclaurin, who replied with Account of Sir Isaac Newton's Discoveries (1748), defending Newton's assertion of the existence of the vacuum.

== Notes ==
Attribution

This article incorporates text from a publication now in the public domain: Lee, Sidney, ed. (1893). "Martine, George (1702-1741)". Dictionary of National Biography. Vol. 36. London: Smith, Elder & Co.
