= Alessandro Caprara =

Italian cardinal and archbishop (1626–1711)

His Eminence Alessandro Caprarra
- Church: Roman Catholic
- See: Title of Santi Nereo e Achilleo
- Installed: 26 June 1706
- Term ended: 9 June 1711
- Predecessor: Leandro Colloredo
- Successor: Benedetto Odescalchi-Erba

Orders
- Ordination: 12 June 1650
- Created cardinal: 26 June 1706 by Pope Clement XI
- Rank: Cardinal-Priest

Personal details
- Born: 17 September 1626 Bologna
- Died: 9 June 1711 (aged 84) Rome
- Buried: Church of Santa Maria del Suffragio
- Denomination: Roman Catholic
- Parents: Massimo degl'Anziani and Caterina Bentivoglio

Alessandro Caprara (17 September 1626, in Bologna – 9 June 1711, in Rome) was an Italian cardinal.

== Biography ==
Cardinal Caprara was born in Bologna on 17 September 1626. He was the eldest of the seven children of Massimo degl'Anziani and Caterina Bentivoglio.

He completed his education at the University of Bologna receiving a doctorate in both canon and civil law in 1647, and began his legal career. He was ordained to the priesthood on 12 June 1650 in Rome.

Under Caprara, the young Prospero Lambertini made his legal apprenticeship. Pope Clement XI created him a cardinal priest on 17 June 1706. He received the red hat and the title Ss. Nereo ed Achilleo.

He died on 9 June 1711 at the age of 85; at his death he was the oldest member of the College of Cardinals.

== Works ==
- Sanctus Franciscus Xaverius funiculis mire solutus, in Convictorum nobilium Collegii S. Francisci Xaverii Carmina in eiusdem Sancti tutelaris solemnitate, (Bologna, 1640).

Catholic Church titles
| Preceded by Leandro Colloredo | Cardinal-Priest of Santi Nereo e Achilleo; 30 August 1794 – 5 March 1719 | Succeeded by Benedetto Odescalchi-Erba |
Records
| Preceded by Henri Albert de la Grange d'Arquien | Oldest living Member of the Sacred College; 24 May 1707 - 9 June 1711 | Succeeded by Gaspare Carpegna |
