= John-Baptist Hackett =

Irish Catholic theologian

John-Baptist Hackett (alias Hacket, Hacquet, Hecquet) (died 1676) was an Irish Catholic theologian.

== Biography ==
Hackett was born at Fethard, co. Tipperary, Ireland, and was educated in the Dominican convent at Cashel, where he became a member of that order.

As a professor, he subsequently taught with reputation at Milan, Naples, and Rome. He received the degree of master in theology (STM) from the general chapter of the Dominican order in 1644. His character and erudition, gained him the confidence of eminent dignitaries in Italy, and Cardinal Altieri, subsequently Pope Clement X, is said to have urged his promotion to the cardinalate.

Meetings with Hacket at Milan and Cremona was believed to have influenced Lord Philip Howard, afterwards cardinal, to enter the order of St. Dominic. Hacket passed the greater part of his life at Rome, where his works were published.

He died at the convent at Santa Maria sopra Minerva in Rome on 23 August 1676, and was interred in the convent church, in front of the altar of St. Dominic.

== Bibliography ==
- Controversorium Theologicum, folio, 1654.
- Synopsis Theologica', 4to, 1659.
- Synopsis Philosophiæ, 12mo, 1662.
