= Benedetto Erba Odescalchi =

Italian Cardinal and Archbishop

His Eminence Benedetto Erba Odescalchi
- Cardinal, Archbishop of Milan
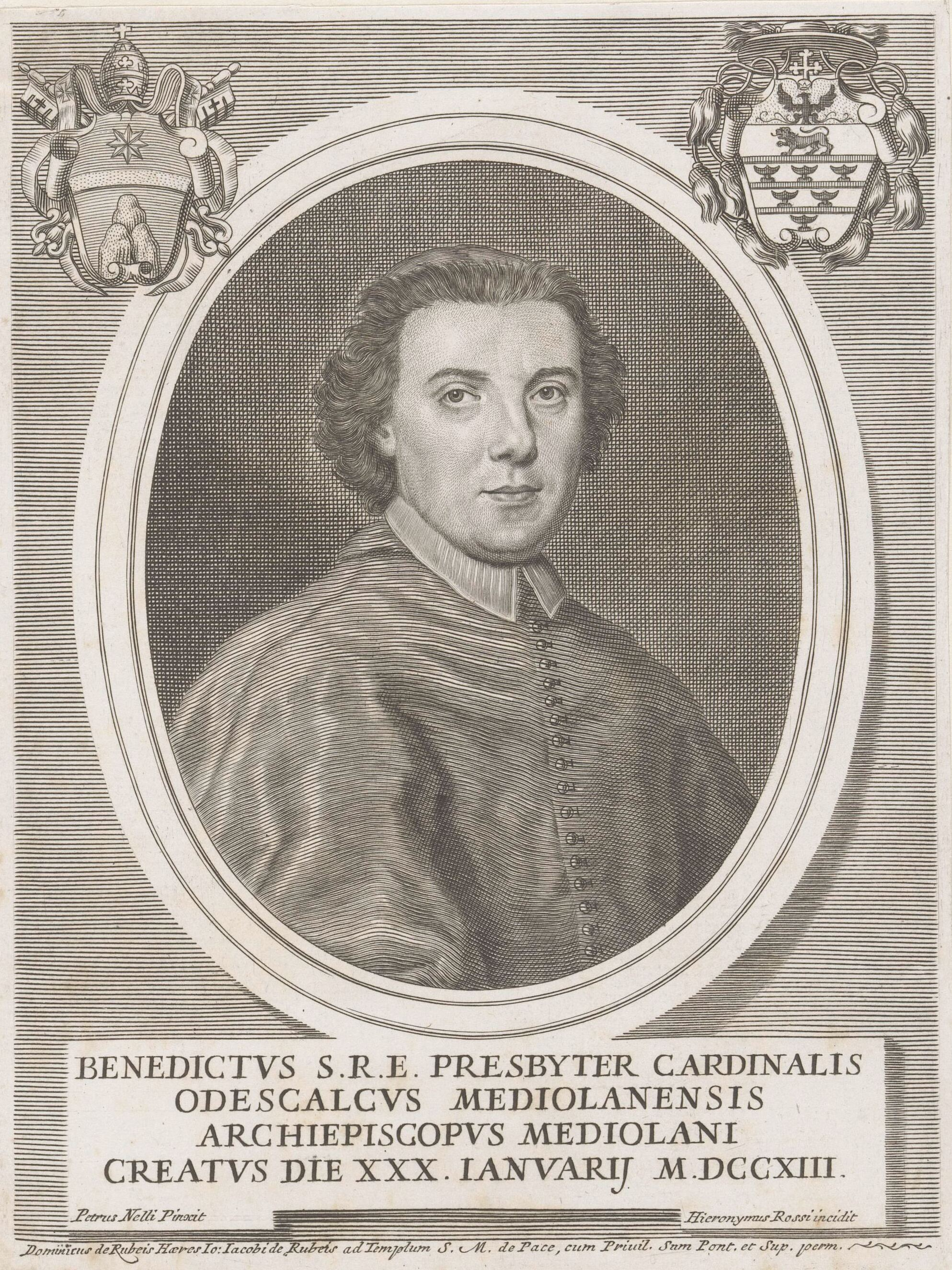
- Church: Catholic Church
- See: Milan
- Appointed: 5 October 1712
- Term ended: 6 December 1736
- Predecessor: Giuseppe Archinto
- Successor: Carlo Gaetano Stampa
- Other post: Cardinal Priest of Santi XII Apostoli

Orders
- Ordination: 18 October 1711 (Priest)
- Consecration: 3 January 1712 (Bishop) by Fabrizio Paolucci
- Created cardinal: 30 January 1713

Personal details
- Born: 7 August 1679 Como
- Died: 13 December 1740 (aged 61) Milan
- Coat of arms

Benedetto (II) Erba Odescalchi (1679–1740) was an Italian Cardinal and Archbishop of Milan from 1712 to 1736.

== Early life ==
Benedetto Erba was born on 7 August 1679 in Como to senator Antonio Maria Erba and Teresa Turconi. His great uncle was Pope Innocent XI, who died when Benedetto was 10 and from whom in 1709 Benedetto took his second surname Odescalchi (hence the lack of a hyphen). On 23 February 1700, Benedetto Erba earned a doctorate in utroque iure at the University of Pavia and he took up a career in the administration of the Papal States: in 1706, he became referendary of the Tribunals of the Apostolic Signature, on 18 April 1709 he was appointed Vice-legate in Ferrara and on 31 July 1710 Vice-legate in Bologna, a position he kept until 10 September 1710.

Already on 28 February 1689, with his tonsure, Benedetto Erba entered in the clerical state, and he was ordained deacon on 11 October 1711 and Priest a week later. He was appointed Titular archbishop of Thessalonica on 18 December 1711, and on 3 January 1712 consecrated bishop in Rome by Cardinal Fabrizio Paolucci. On 25 January 1712, he became assistant at the Pontifical Throne. Benedetto Erba served as Apostolic Nuncio to Poland from 25 January 1712 to 5 October of the same year.

== Archbishop of Milan ==
On 5 October 1712, Benedetto Erba was appointed Archbishop of Milan, however he entered in Milan only in August 1714 due to his ongoing diplomatic services. On 30 January 1713, he was appointed Cardinal Priest of Santi Nereo e Achilleo, a title he maintained until 1725 when he moved to the title of Santi XII Apostoli.

As Archbishop of Milan, he focused on pastoral activities, taking as examples Saint Charles Borromeo and Pope Innocent XI. He took care of the education of the secular priests and tried to reform the monasteries of nuns. In 1717, he made a pastoral visit to a remote area of the diocese, in the mountains of Ticino, and also in the following years, he went on visiting the remote areas of his large diocese. Since 1723, he started the so-called Urban Missions in order to increase the religious sentiment of the town.

He founded the seminary of St. John on the Wall in Milan, one of the largest in the town, on 22 July 1714, he approved the Congregation of the Missionary Oblates of Rho and in 1735 he authorized the erection of a house of Ursulines in Milan. In 1716, Benedetto Erba obtained from Pope Clement XI that the ordinary canon priests of the Cathedral of Milan could wear the white damask mitre in solemn celebrations. He personally supervised the restoration of the dome and of the crypt of the Basilica of Sant'Ambrogio, decorating it with rococo style.

Benedetto Erba was a great patron of culture and arts, as well as a collector of sculptures and paintings, and most of his gallery is now at the Diocesan Museum of Milan, including the 41 portraits of the first archbishops of Milan he commissioned since 1715.

Even if under his reign the Duchy of Milan passed from the Spanish Empire to the Habsburg monarchy, Benedetto Erba succeeded in maintaining good relations with all the political powers. He participated to the 1721, 1724 and 1730 Papal conclaves, and in all these three conclaves it was thought possible that he would be elected pope.

In 1731, he suffered a stroke which impaired him for the following years. Due to this health problem, he resigned as Archbishop of Milan on 6 December 1736, and retired to live in his family house in Milan, where he died on 13 December 1740. He was buried in the nearby church of San Giovanni in Conca, which was demolished between the 19th and 20th century. His remains are now buried in the Cathedral of Milan.

In August 2013, coinciding with the completion of Cardinal Carlo Maria Martini's tomb, Erba Odescalchi's burial monument was also finished, designed to match the style of other episcopal tombs set into the cathedral floor, featuring a polychrome marble design that displays his cardinal's coat of arms, his name, and details regarding his titles and dates of birth and death.
