= Johann Rudolf Faesch =

Johann Rudolf Faesch (born 18 October 1572 in Basel, died 7 May 1659 in Basel) was a Swiss silk merchant, politician and diplomat from Basel. He was part of several Swiss diplomatic missions and held numerous high offices of the city. In 1630 he became head of the guild and from 1636 to his death in 1659 he was Burgomaster of Basel alongside his rival Johann Rudolf Wettstein. Faesch led the council's pro-French faction while Wettstein led the pro-Confederacy faction.

Faesch belonged to the Faesch (Fesch) family, one of Basel's leading patrician families. The family had been recognised as noble by the Holy Roman Emperor in 1563. He was a son of Remigius Faesch, one of Basel's leading politicians and diplomats of his time, who also was Burgomaster of Basel among numerous other offices.

Among his descendants were Cardinal Joseph Fesch, Napoleon's uncle, who became a Prince of France, a member of the Imperial House of the First French Empire, a Peer of France and a Roman Prince among countless other titles.
