= Musée Fesch =

Coordinates: 41°55′18″N 8°44′18″E

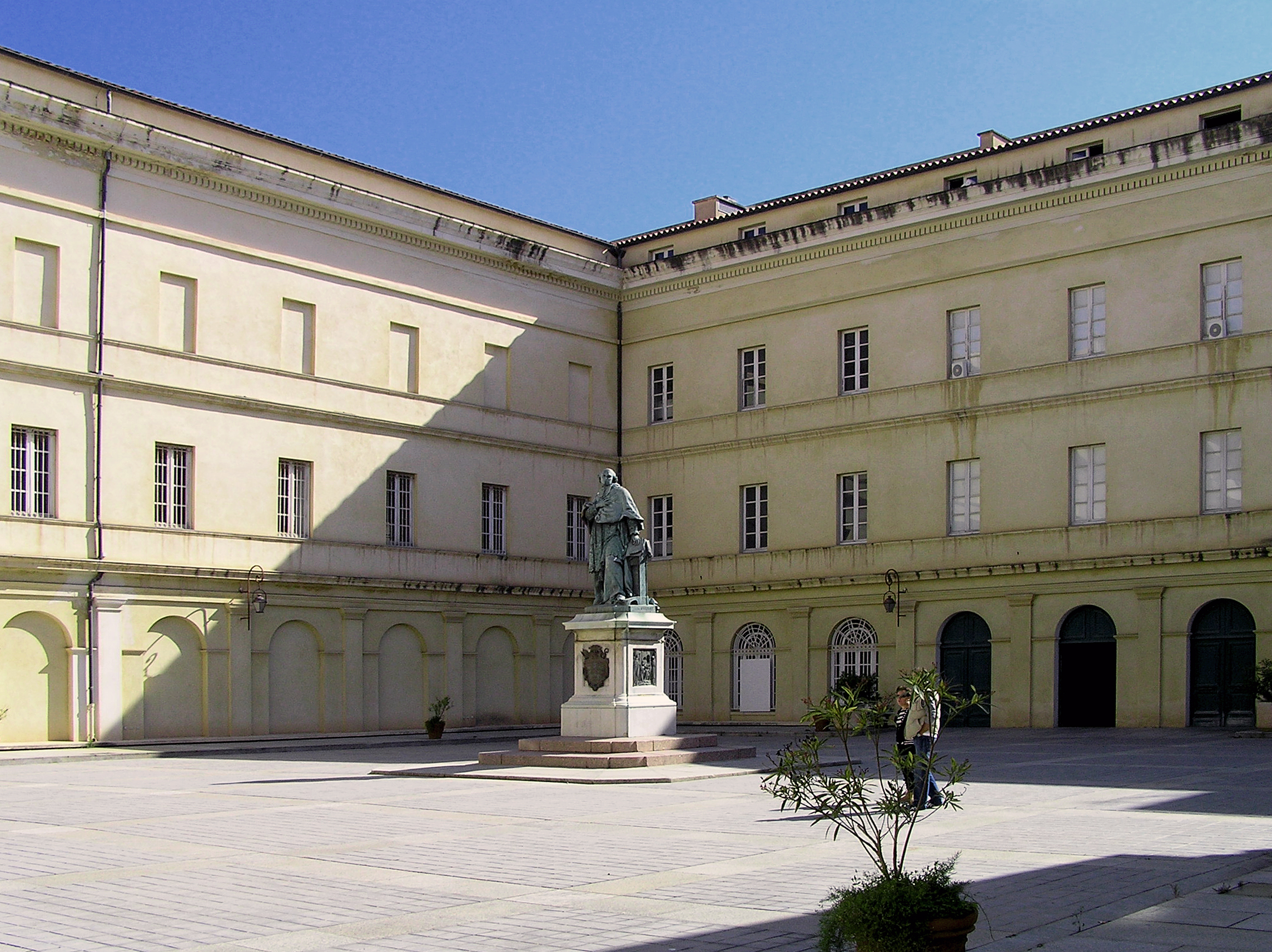
- Established: 1852
- Location: Ajaccio, Corsica
- Type: Art museum
- Founder: Joseph Fesch

The musée Fesch (officially, Palais Fesch-musée des beaux-arts) is the central museum of fine arts in Ajaccio on Corsica. Located within the gated Palais Fesch, it is in the town's Borgu d'Ajaccio quarter. It was established by Napoleon I's uncle, cardinal Joseph Fesch (a Prince of France from 1807), in Fesch's birthplace.

== Location ==
The Fesch museum is located in Ajaccio, the birthplace of its founder, the cardinal Joseph Fesch. It is housed in the 19th-century Palais Fesch on Rue Cardinal Fesch. The Palais Fesch also houses a college of that name, which contains a large collection of pictures, though most of them are copies. There is also a library of 30,000 volumes, and a collection of Corsican minerals. The courtyard contains a bronze statue of Cardinal Fesch. In the right wing of the palace is the Chapelle Fesch, built in 1855, containing the tombs of Letizia Ramolino, mother of Napoleon, and of Cardinal Fesch. The Bibliothèque Municipale, an adjacent building, contains rare antique books. It was completed in 1837.

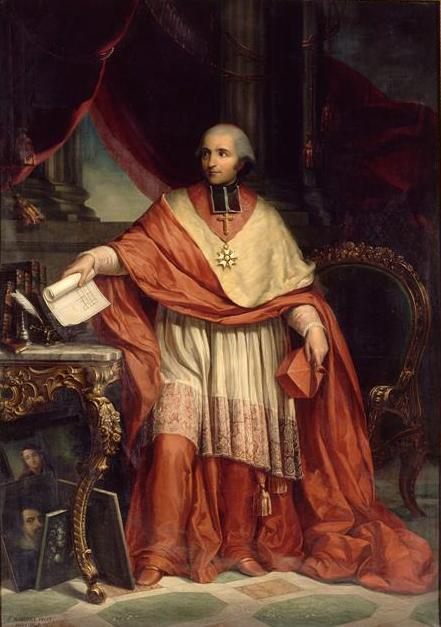
Jérôme Maglioli, Portrait of Cardinal Fesch, Musée Fesch.

== History ==
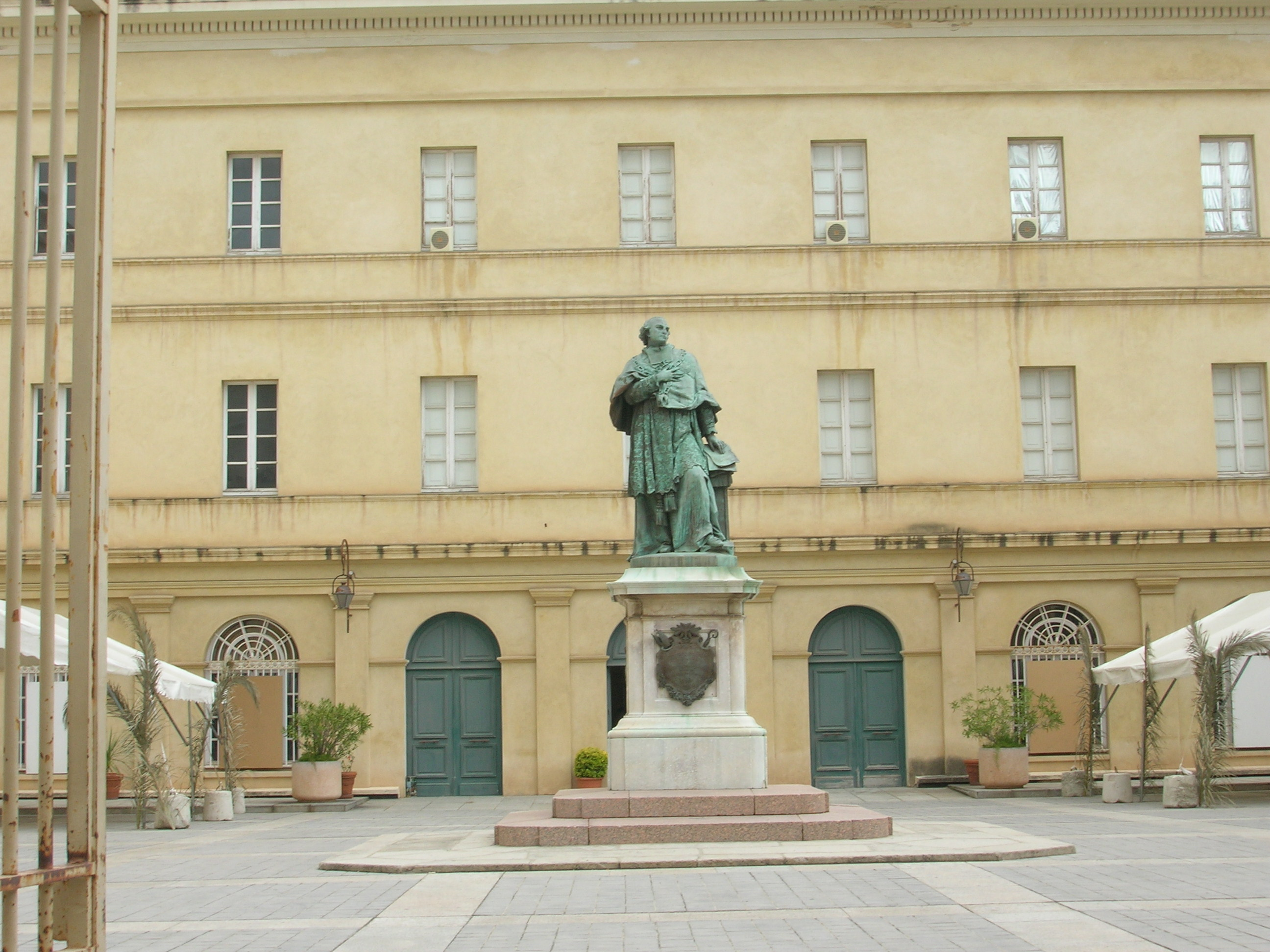
Statue of Cardinal Joseph Fesch (Archbishop of Lyon 1802–1839) in the forecourt of the museum

The initiative to build the museum was taken by Napoleon I's maternal uncle, cardinal Joseph Fesch (1763–1839), archbishop of Lyon and the primate of the Gauls. It was Fesch's wish to establish an Institute of Arts and Sciences in his hometown. Before he died in 1839, Fesch donated 1000 art works including 843 paintings, from his large collection of more than 17,000, to the museum.

The museum was first designed in 1806 but construction started only in 1827 with the efforts of Mgr Péraldi, the cardinal's friend and agent. In 1829, the construction was interrupted by the then government of Bourbons as it was considered a slight to the government because its opulent design and display and was done by Péraldi who had been exiled to Rome following the fall of the empire. The construction was resumed in 1833 and completed in 1852, the Corsican architect Frassato directed this stage of construction. However, Fesch did not live to see the completed museum as he died in Rome in 1839.

== Features ==
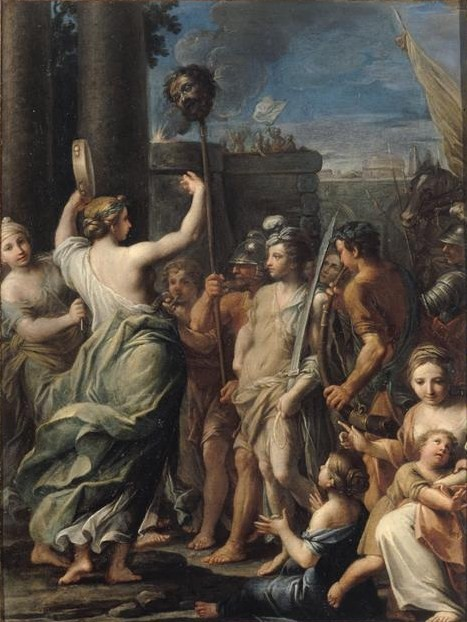
Giacomo Boni, The Triumph of David.

The most impressive painting collections at the museum are arranged in several halls in the specific periods of the Early Italian and Renaissance, the Roman Baroque and the Neapolitan Baroque. The museum contains one of France's finest collections of Italian old masters, including Botticelli, Giovanni Bellini, Cosmè Tura, one of the most important Napoleonic collection of paintings and memorabilia and a Corsican Collection of paintings. The four-storey building which displays more than 400 works of the collection in 27 rooms features the Napoleonic Collection in the basement. Niveau 1 contains 16th and 17th century Italian paintings such as Botticelli's Virgin and Child, Titian's Man with a Glove, and Paolo Veronese's Leda and the Swan. Niveau 2 features 17th- and 18th-century paintings, including Poussin's Midas à la source du fleuve Pactole and Recco's Ray on a Cauldron with Fish in a Basket while the Grand Gallery, also on this floor, hosts large canvases, such as Gregorio de Ferrari's Holy Family.

=== Italian school ===
- Early Italian and Renaissance: Bernardo Daddi, Niccolò di Tommaso, Sandro Botticelli, Giovanni Bellini, Lorenzo di Credi, Cosmè Tura, Niccolò Pisano, Mariotto di Nardo, Cosimo Rosselli, Jacopo del Sellaio, Giovanni Boccati, Liberale da Verona, Francesco Francia, Perugino.
  - 16th century: Michelangelo, Fra Bartolomeo, Bartolomeo Veneto, Jacopo da Empoli, Dosso Dossi, Bernardino Luini, Baccio Bandinelli, Luca Longhi, Titian, Veronese, Giorgio Vasari, Santi di Tito.
- 17th century: Pietro da Cortona, Guercino, Salvatore Rosa, Luca Giordano, Andrea Pozzo, Ludovico Carracci, Giovanni Lanfranco, Baciccio, Carlo Maratta, Cavaliere D'arpino, Mattia Preti, Carlo Saraceni, Paolo Porpora, Antonio Tempesta, Giovanni Battista Ruoppolo, Ventura Salimbeni, Gregorio de Ferrari, Giacomo Boni, Rutilio Manetti, Francesco Guarino, Carlo Sellitto, Antonio Gherardi, Giuseppe Recco, Pietro Paolini, Evaristo Baschenis, Micco Spadaro, Ciro Ferri, Carlo Cignani, Ludovico Cigoli, Francesco Noletti, Andrea Belvedere, Filippo Vitale, Giuseppe Ghezzi.
- 18th century: Sebastiano Ricci, Francesco Solimena, Corrado Giaquinto, Giovanni Paolo Pannini, Sebastiano Conca, Andrea Procaccini, Marco Benefial, Francesco Trevisani, Luigi Garzi, Marcello Bacciarelli, Benedetto Luti, etc.

=== Other schools ===
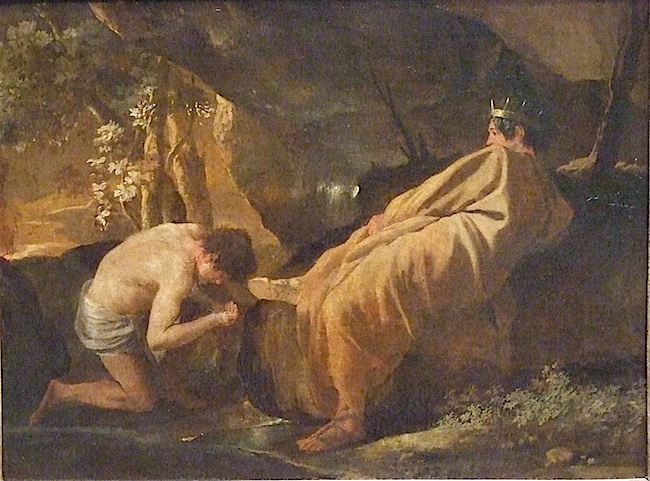
Poussin, Midas at the Source of the River Pactolus.

- French school: Nicolas Poussin, Simon Vouet, Gaspard Dughet, Nicolas Tournier, Claude Vignon, Étienne Parrocel, Pierre Subleyras, Charles-Joseph Natoire, Claude Joseph Vernet, Jacques Sablet, Louis Léopold Boilly, Alexandre Cabanel, Carolus-Duran, Paul Trouillebert, etc.
- Northern schools (mainly 17th century artists who sojourned in Italy): Van Dyck, Willem van Aelst, Nicolaes Berchem, Govert Flinck, Jan Frans van Bloemen, Matthias Stomer, Adam Elsheimer, Hendrick Goltzius, David de Koninck, Jan Miel, Jan Vonck, Johann Karl Loth, Matthijs Bril, Abraham Janssens, Frans Badens, Daniel Seyter, Philipp Peter Roos, Johannes Glauber, Bartholomeus Spranger, Caspar van Wittel, Anton von Maron or Anton Raphaël Mengs.
- Corsican school (19th and 20th centuries): Tony Agostini, Jean-Baptiste Bassoul, Émile Brod, Léon-Charles Canniccioni, Jacques-Martin Capponi, Paul Chocarne-Moreau, François Corbellini, Catherine Empis, Dominique Frassati, Alfred de La Rocca, Jérôme Maglioli, Jean-Luc Multedo, Paul-Mathieu Novellini, Lucien Peri, Ludwig Pietzch, etc.
Italian paintings

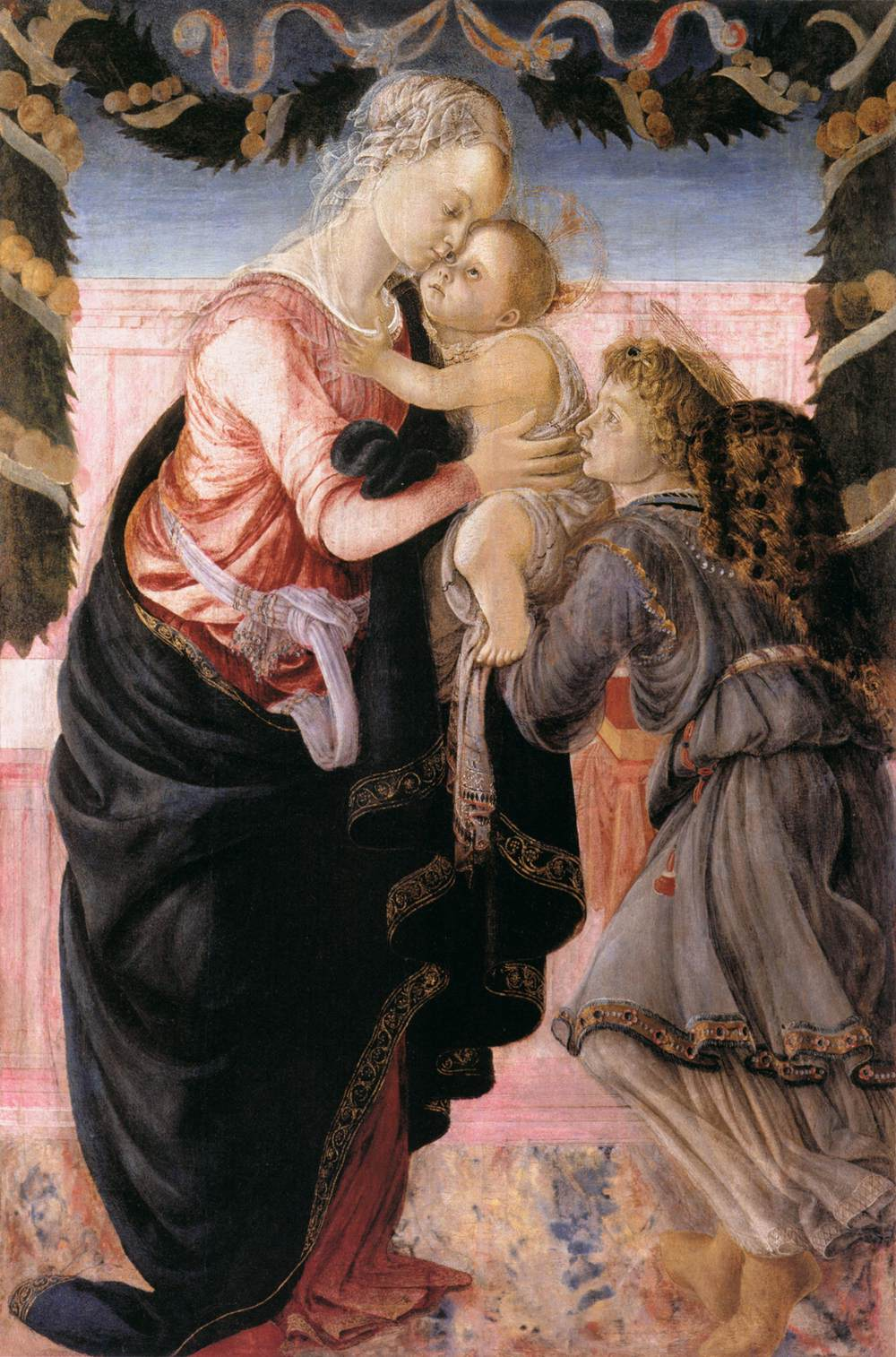
Sandro Botticelli, Madonna and Child held by an Angel under a garland

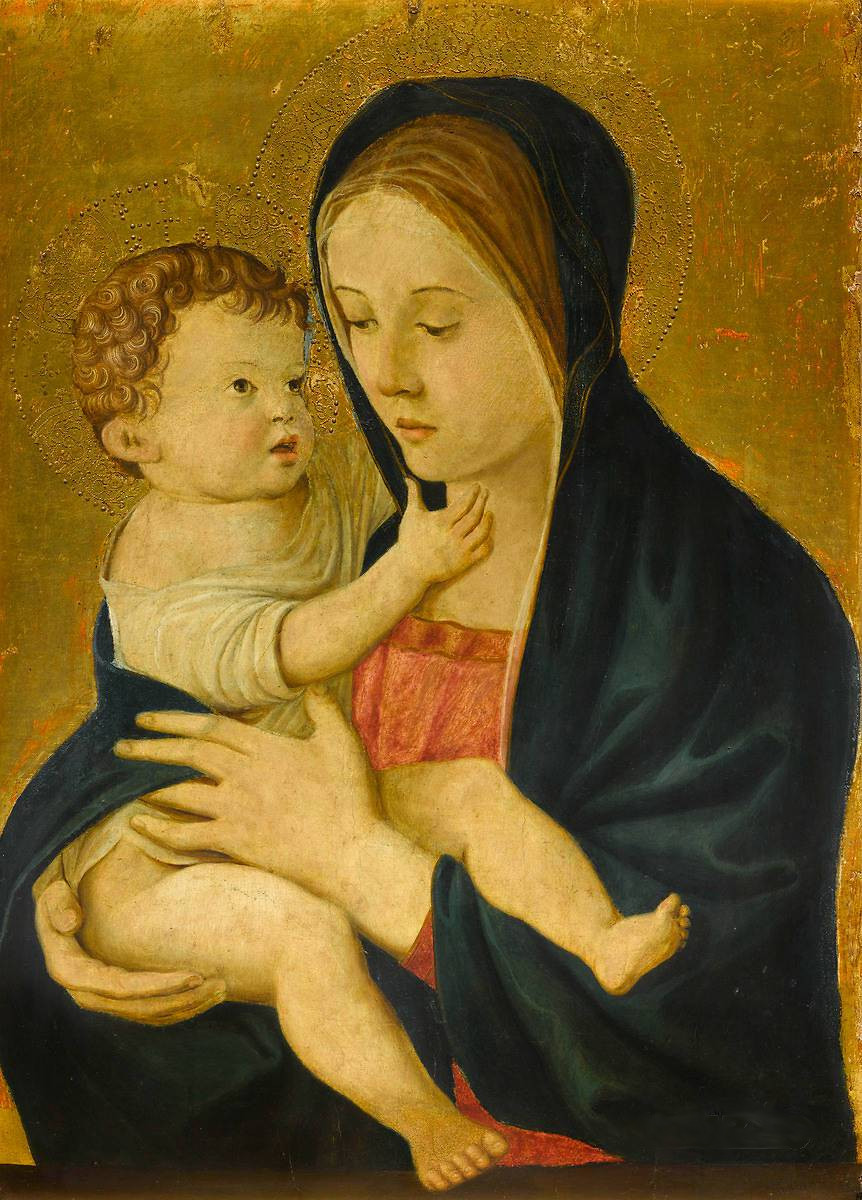
Giovanni Bellini, Madonna and Child

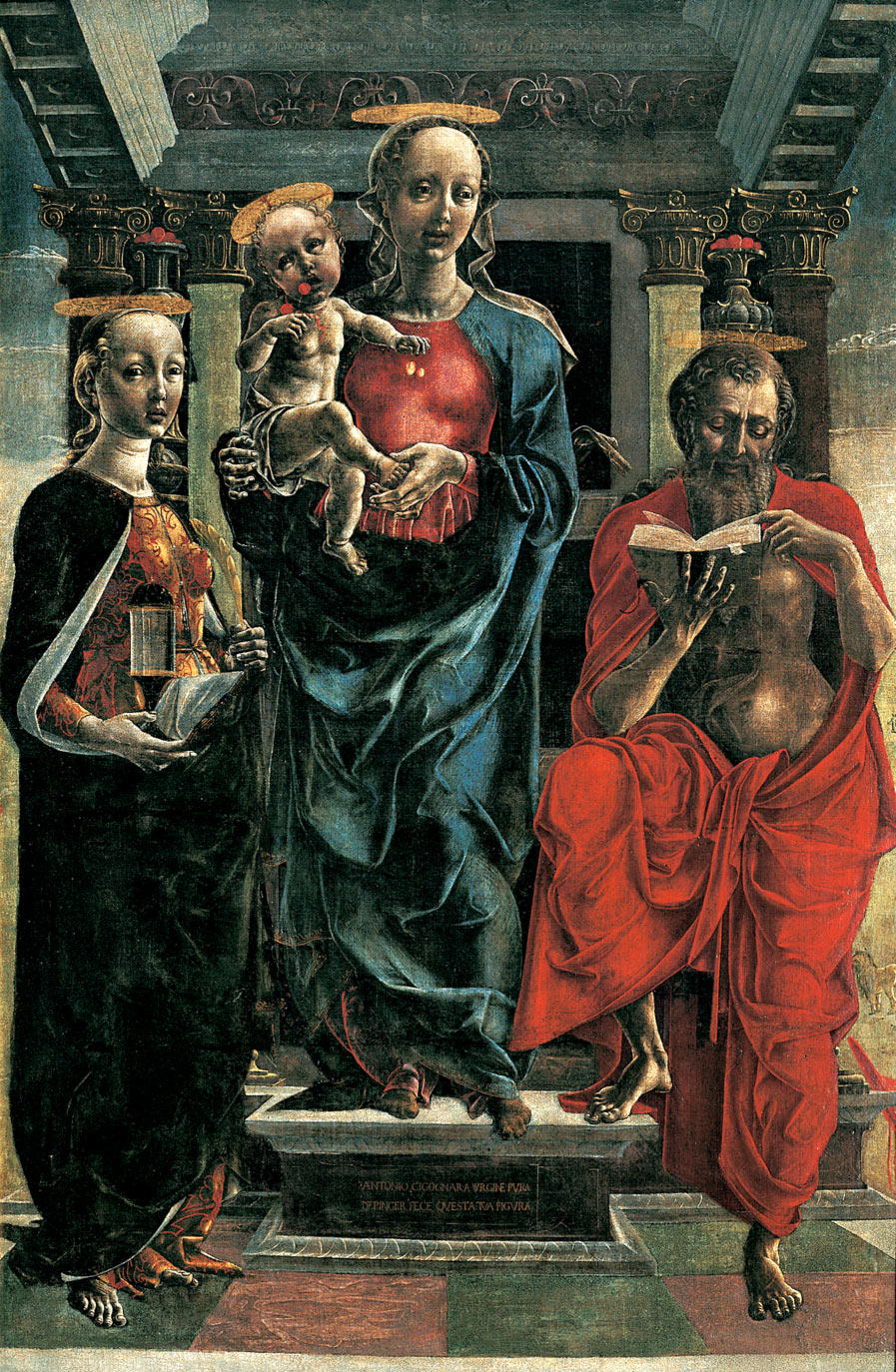
Cosmè Tura, Madonna and Child between a Martyr saint and saint Jerome

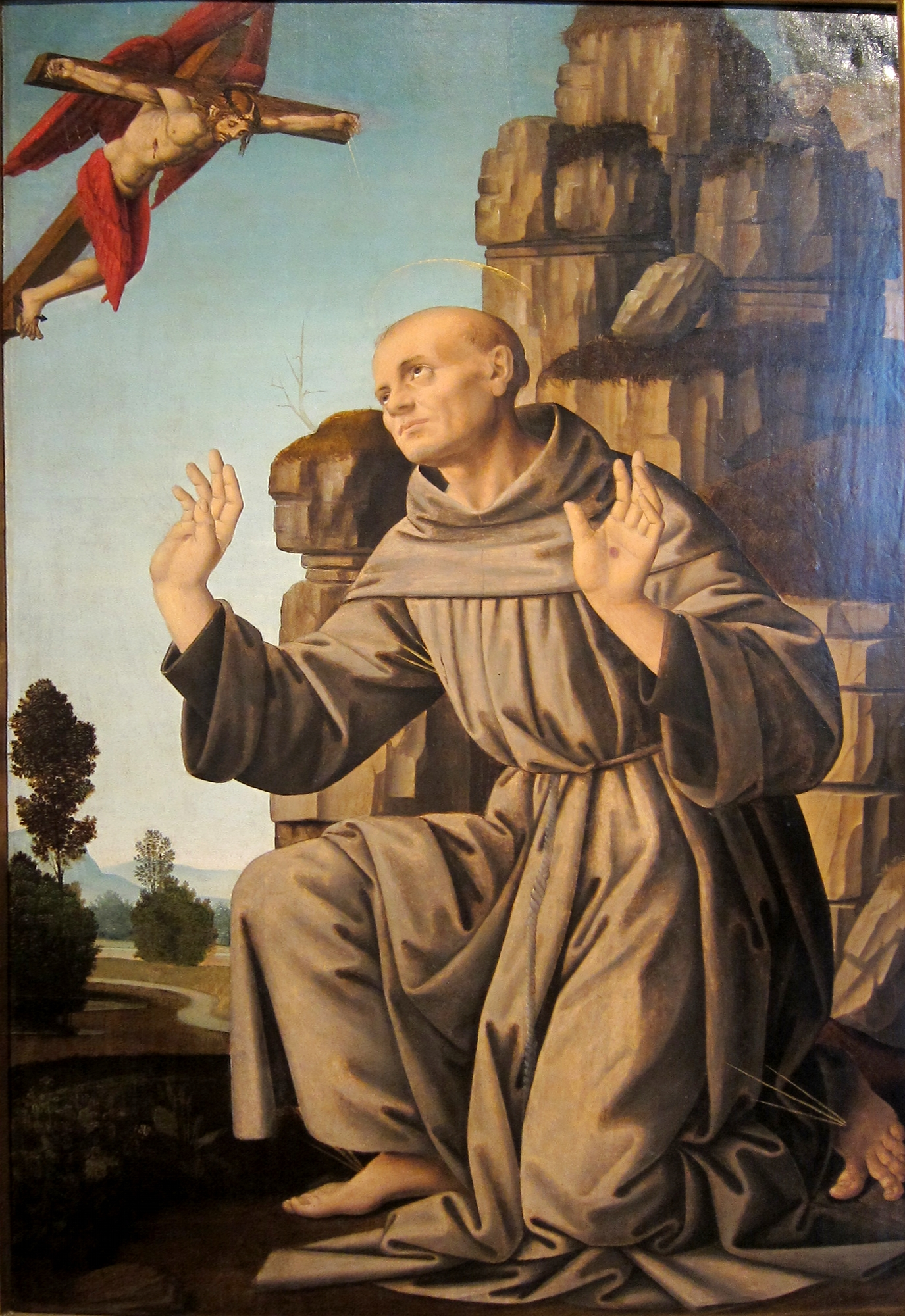
Lorenzo di Credi, Saint Francis of Assisi receiving the Stigmata

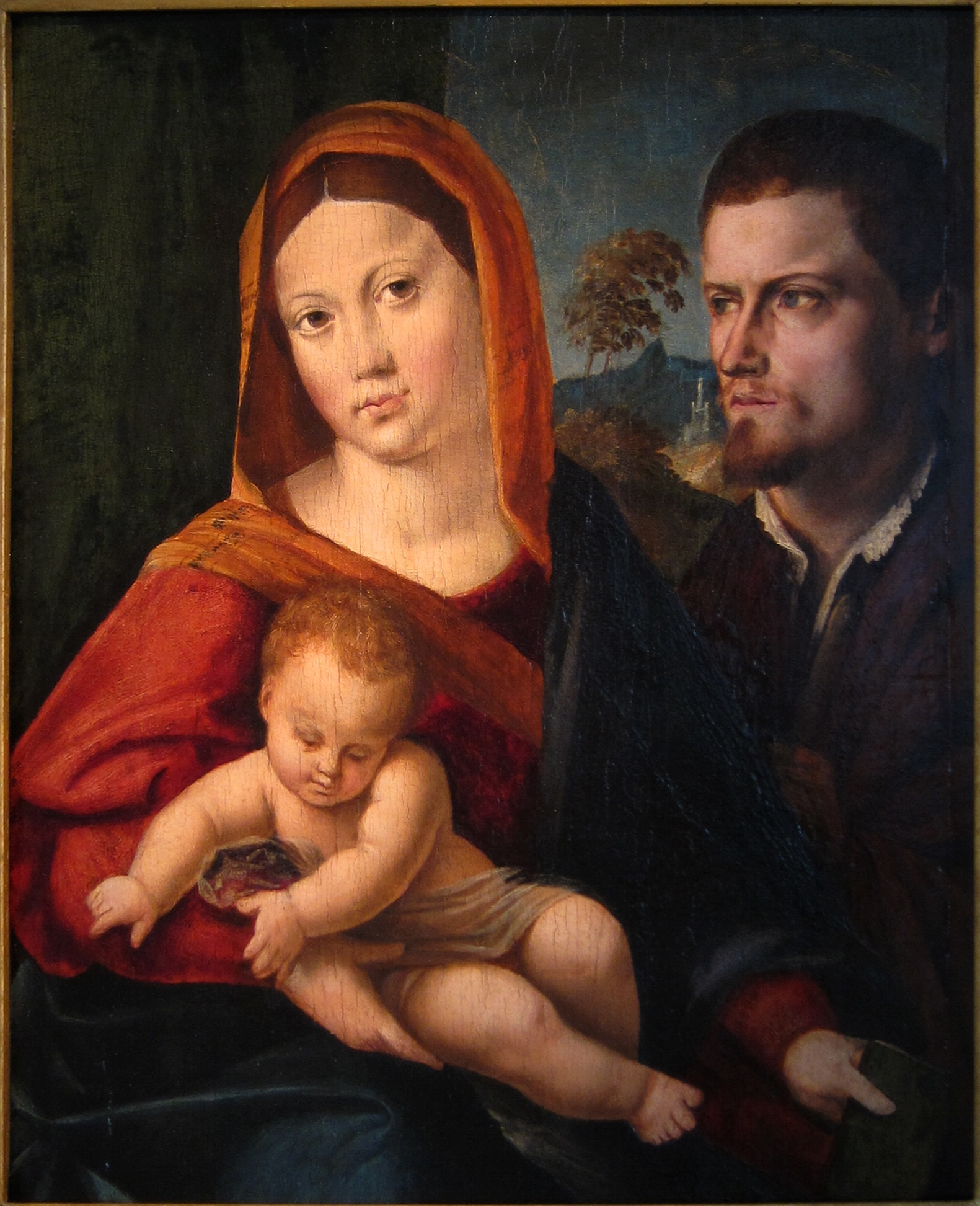
Niccolò Pisano, Holly Family

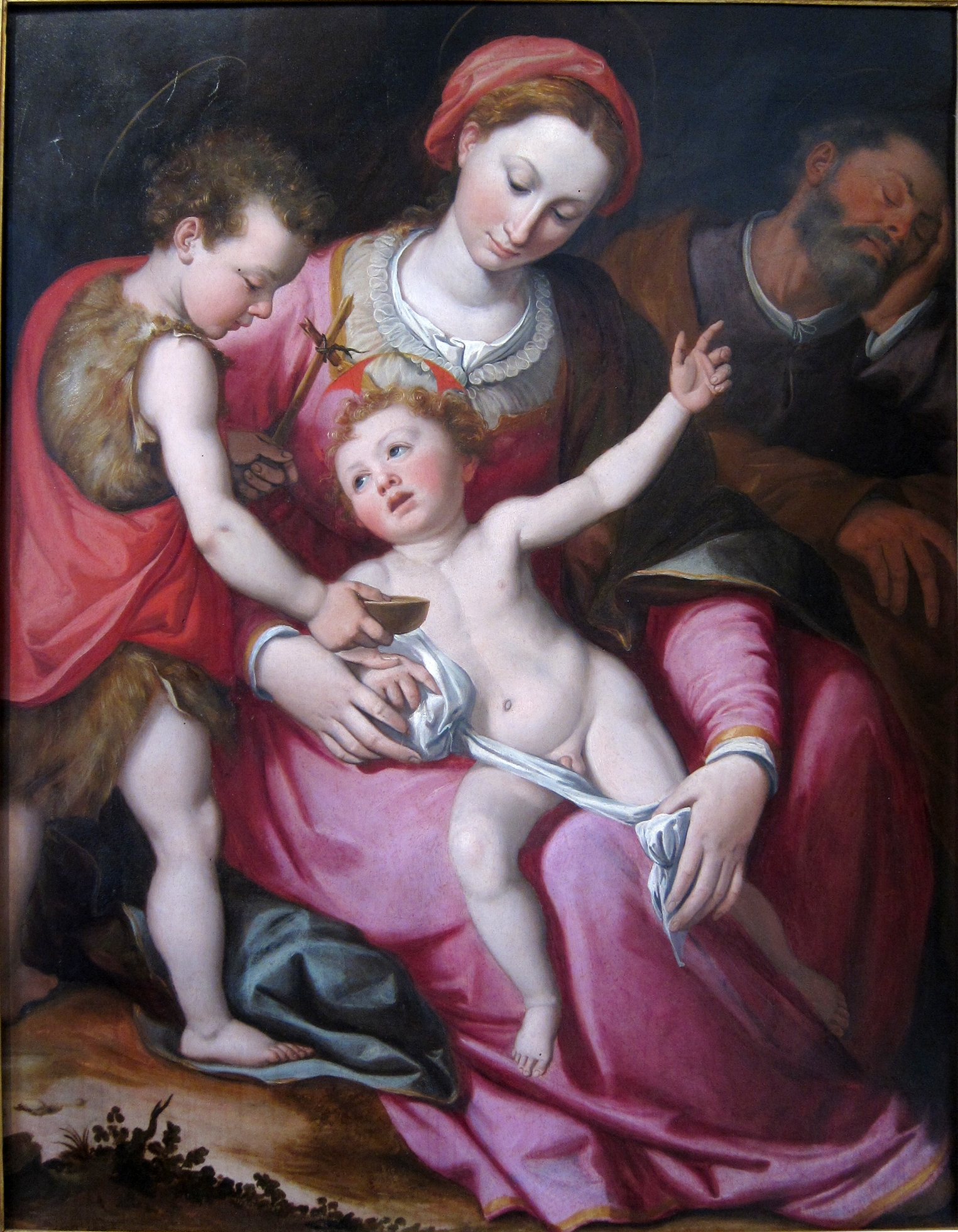
Santi di Tito, Holly Family

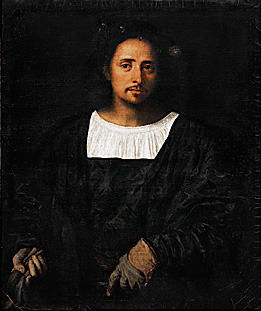
Titian, Man with a Glove

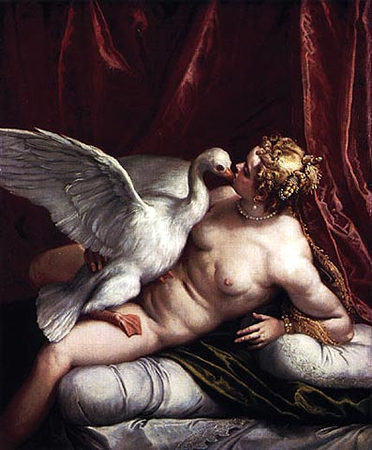
Veronese, Leda and the Swan

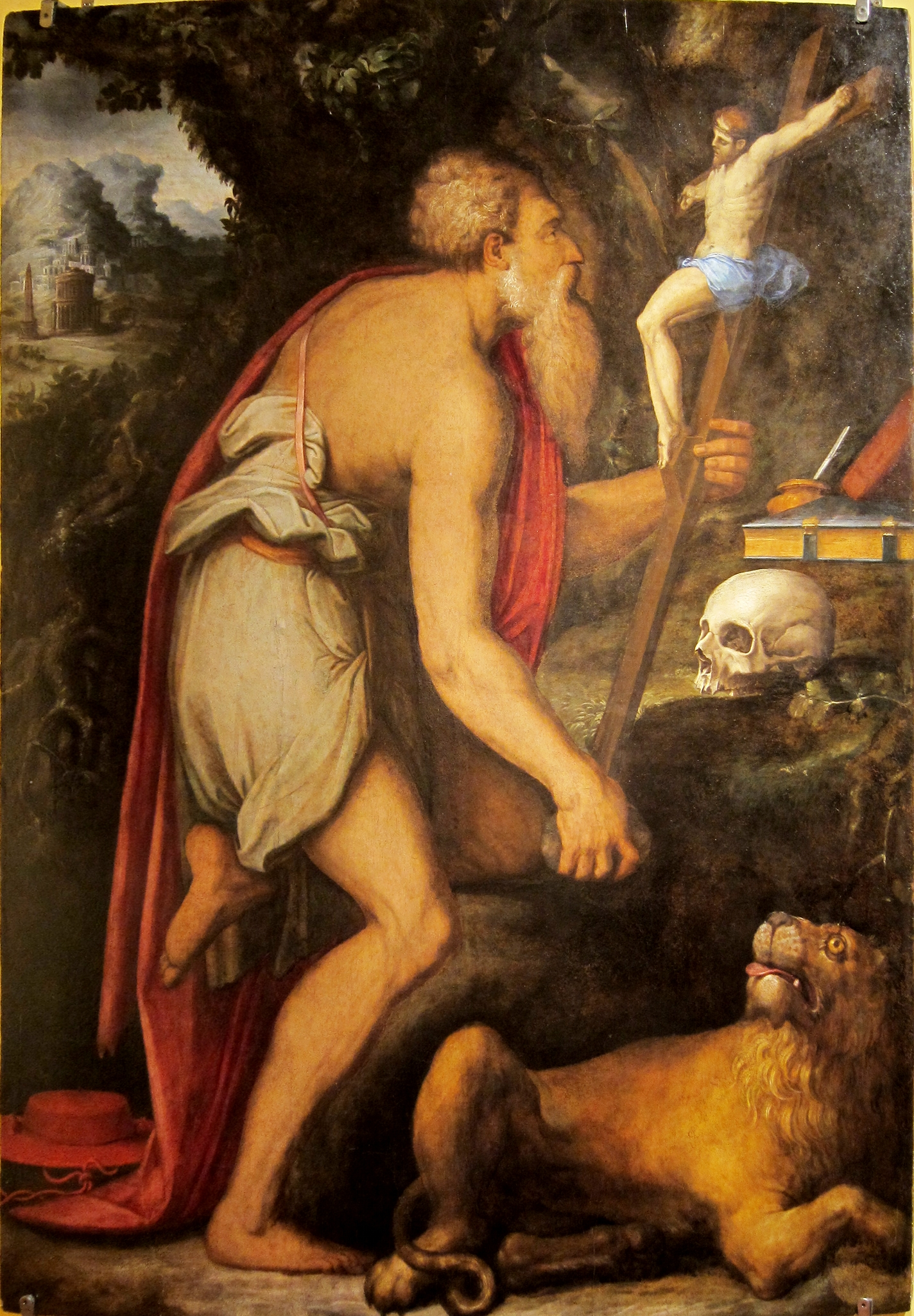
Giorgio Vasari, Saint Jerome

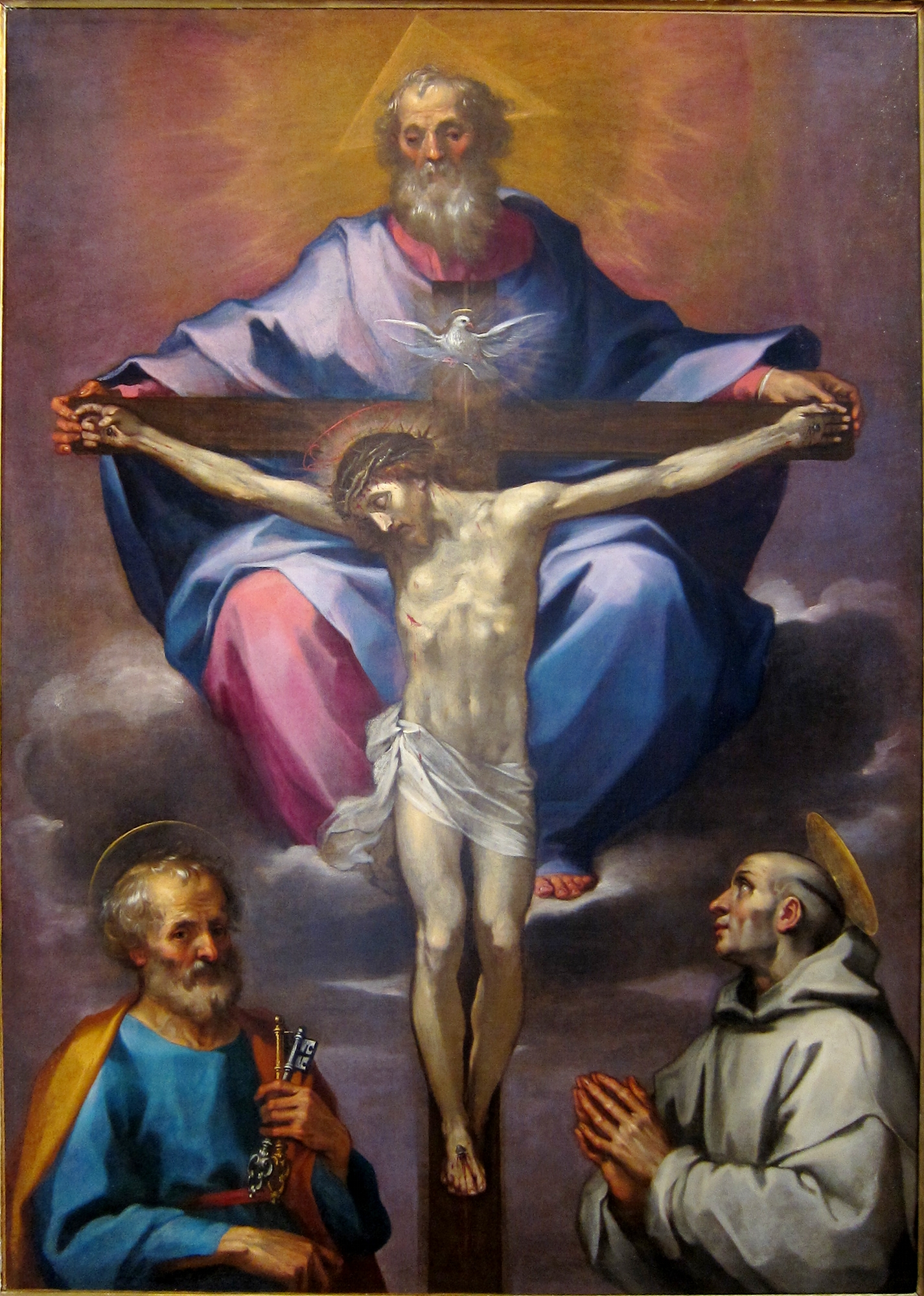
Ventura Salimbeni, The Trinity with saint Peter and saint Bernardine

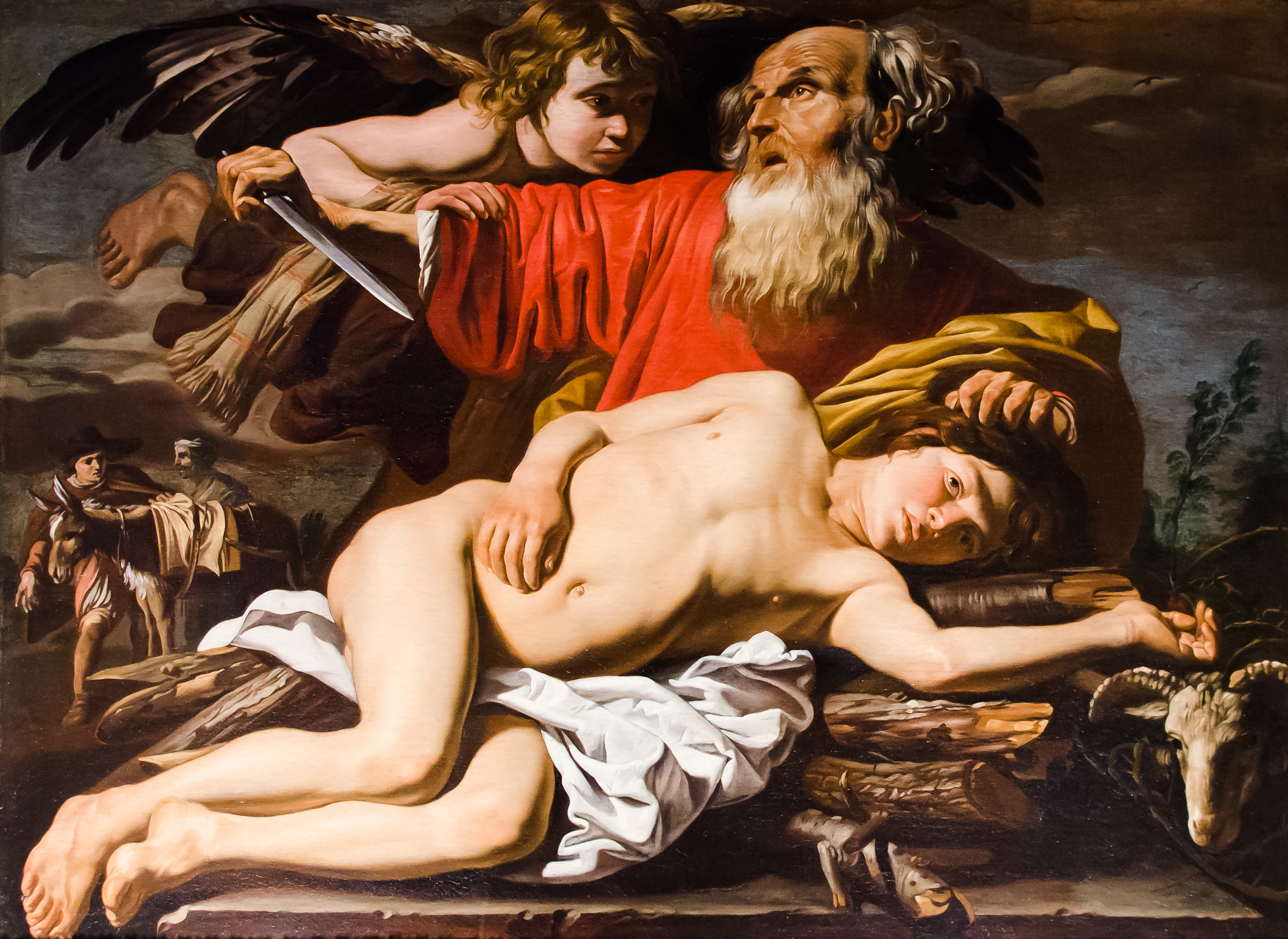
Matthias Stomer, The Sacrifice of Abraham

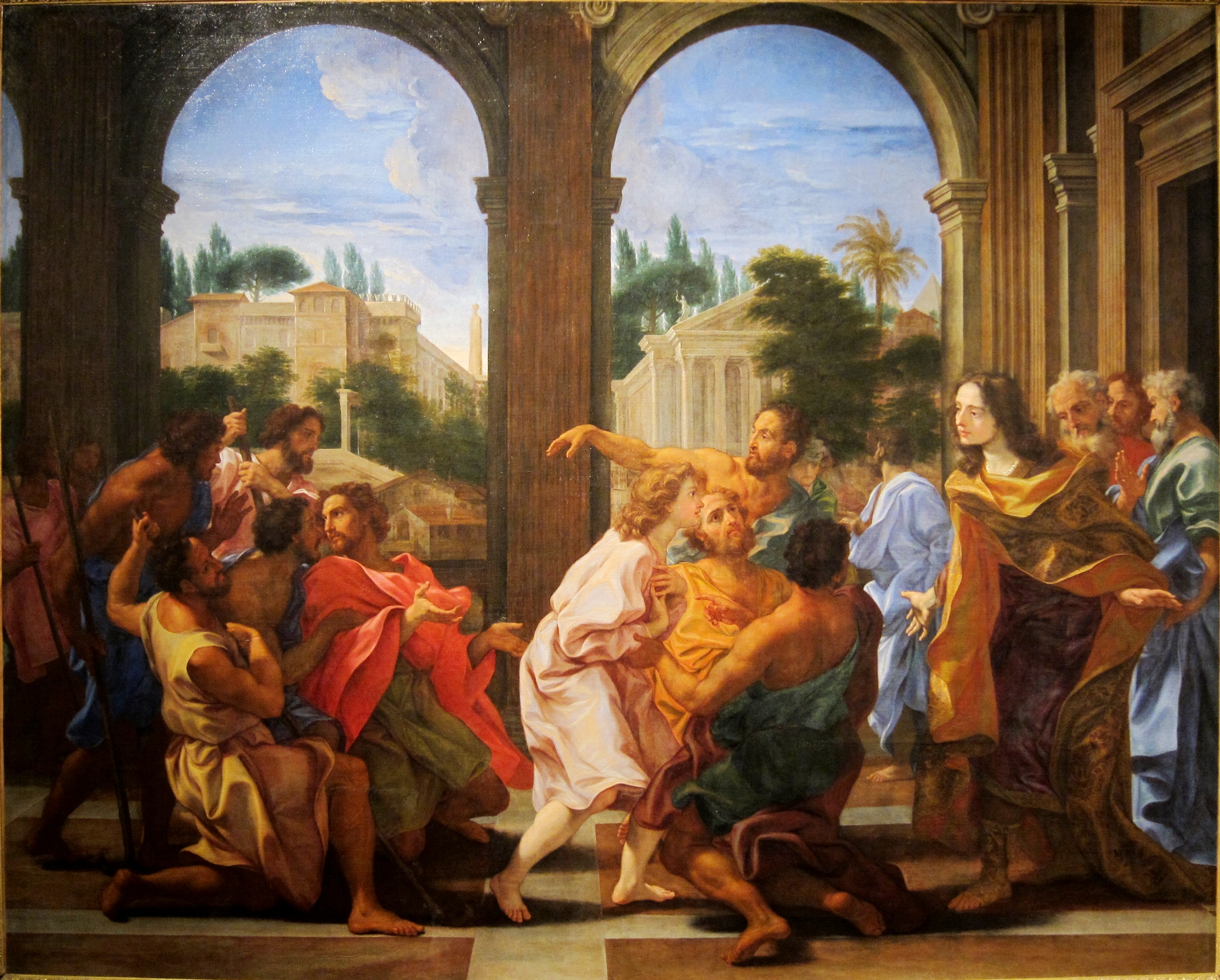
Baciccio, Joseph recognised by his brothers

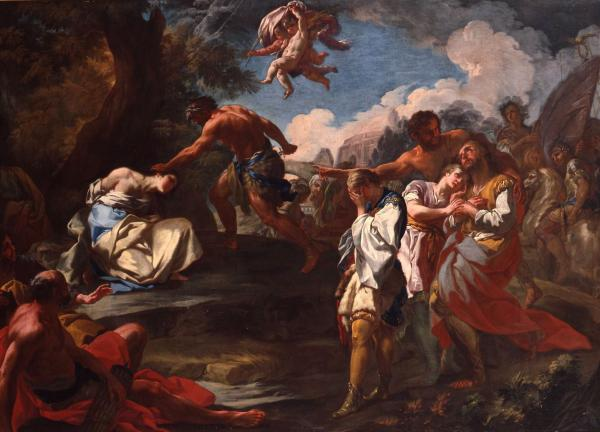
Corrado Giaquinto, Martyrdom of Saint Martha, Marius, Abacus and Audifax
Selfportraits

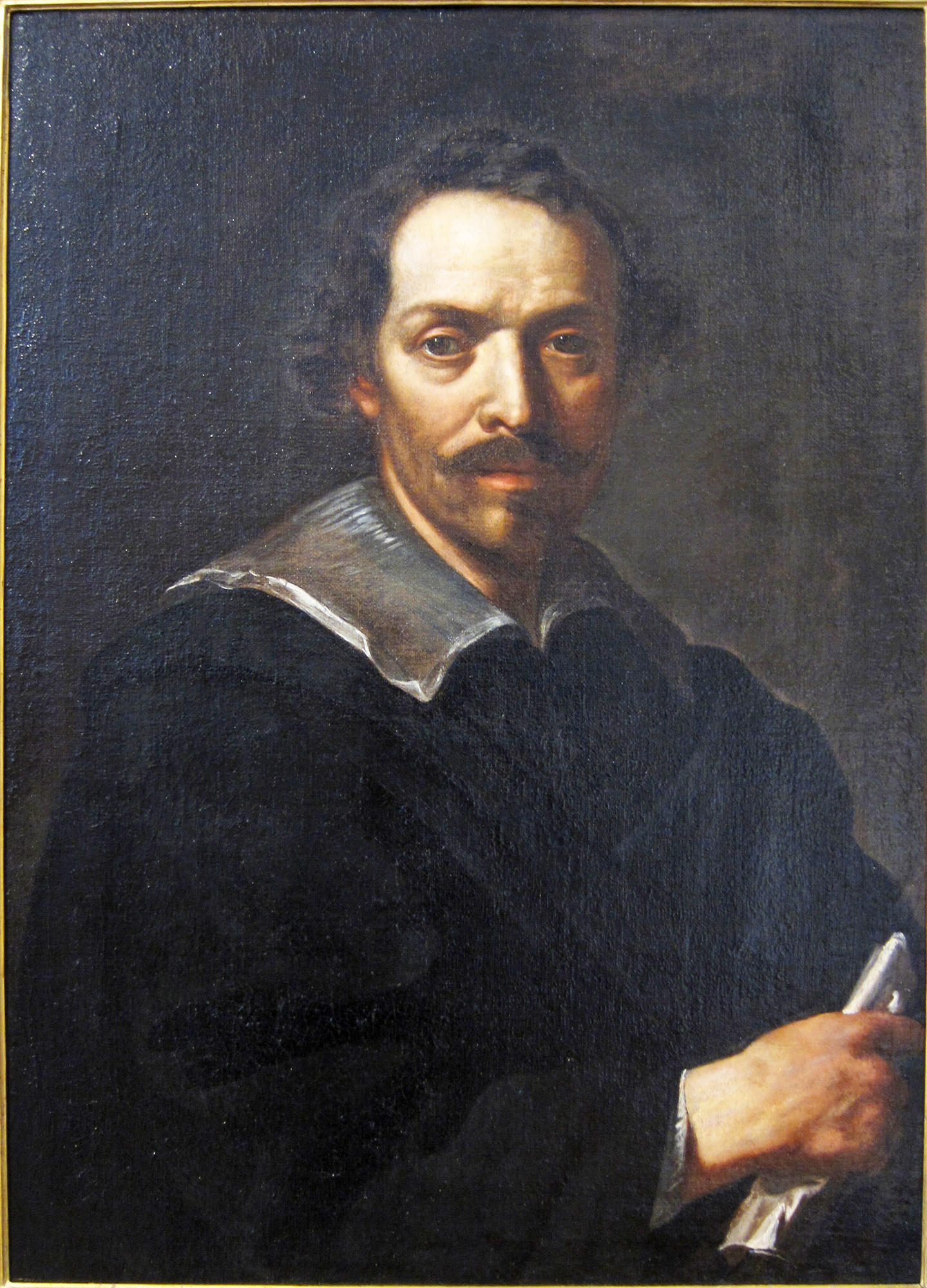
Pietro da Cortona, Selfportrait

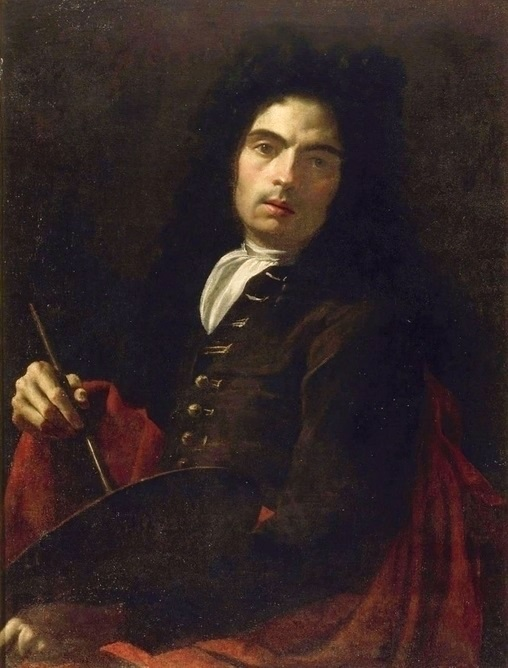
Corrado Giaquinto, Selfportrait

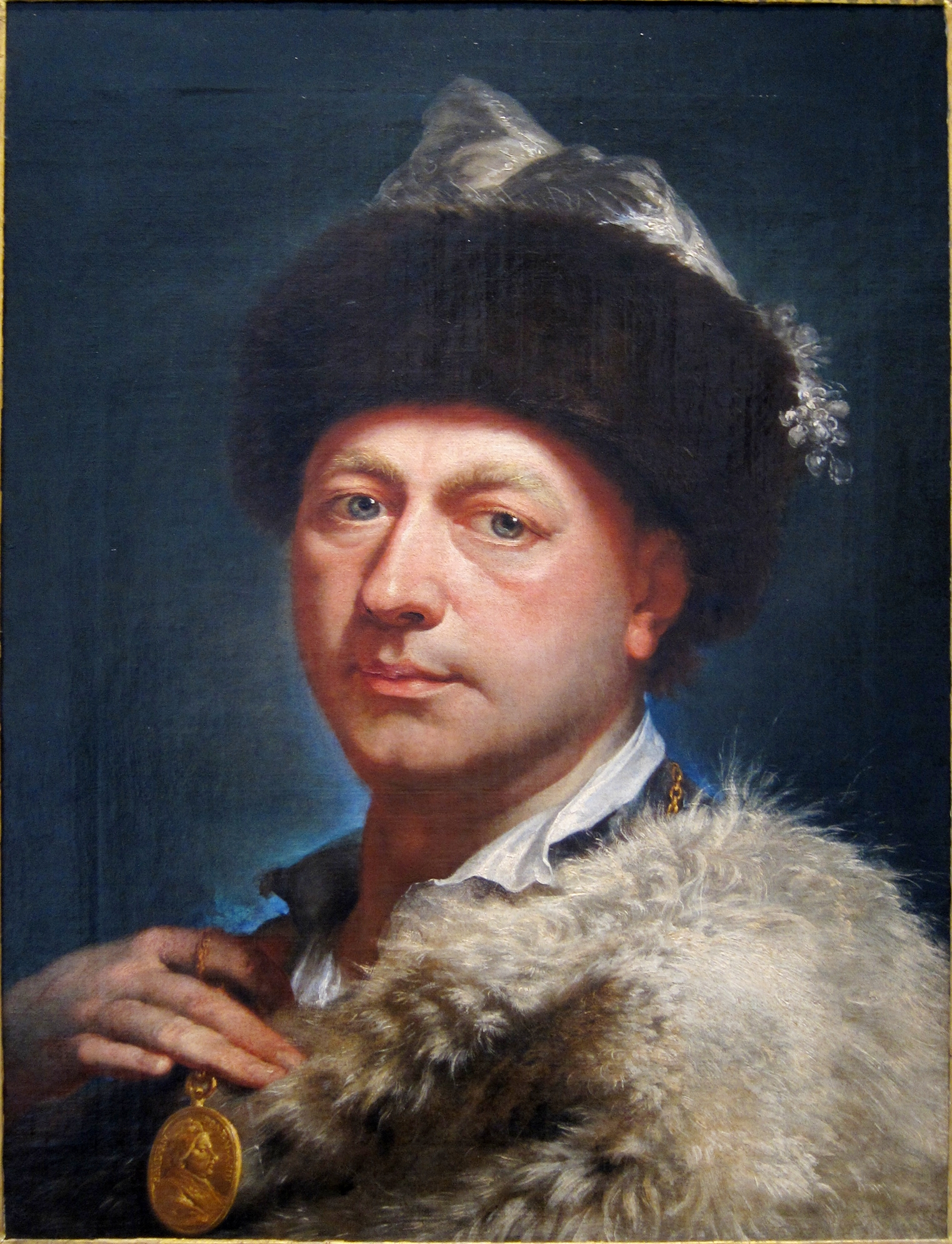
Marcello Bacciarelli, Selfportrait

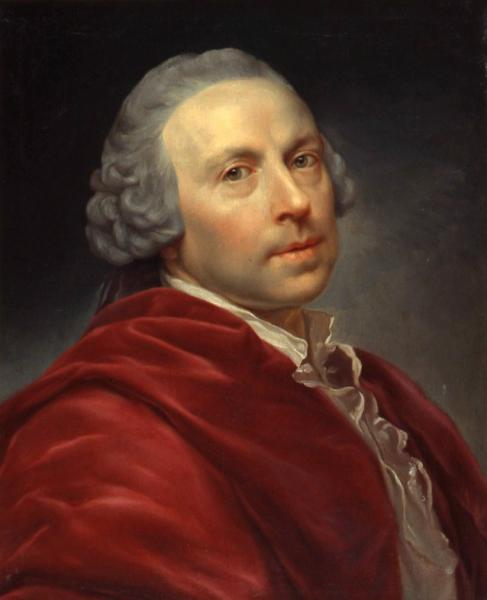
Anton von Maron, Selfportrait

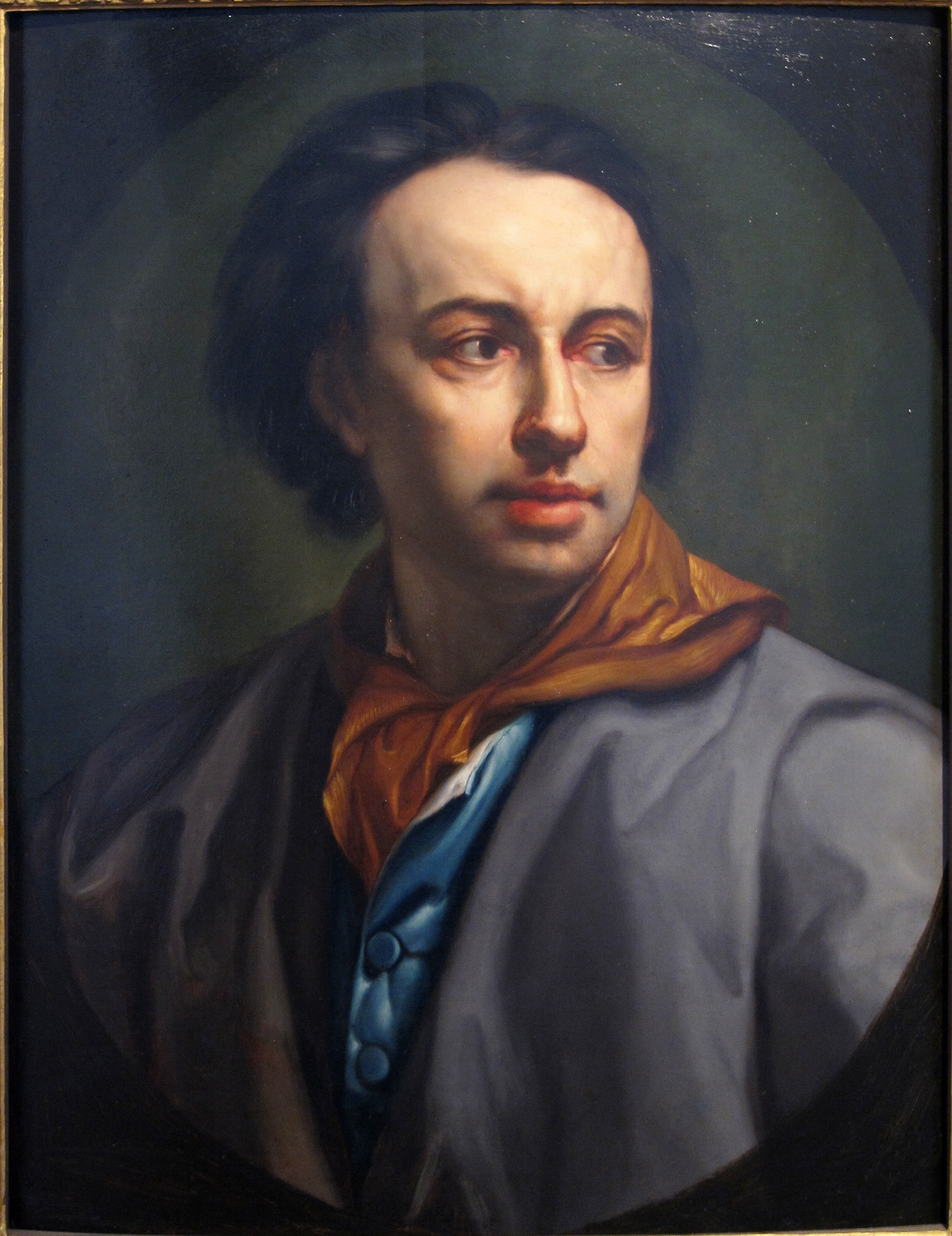
Anton Raphaël Mengs, Selfportrait
French Pictures

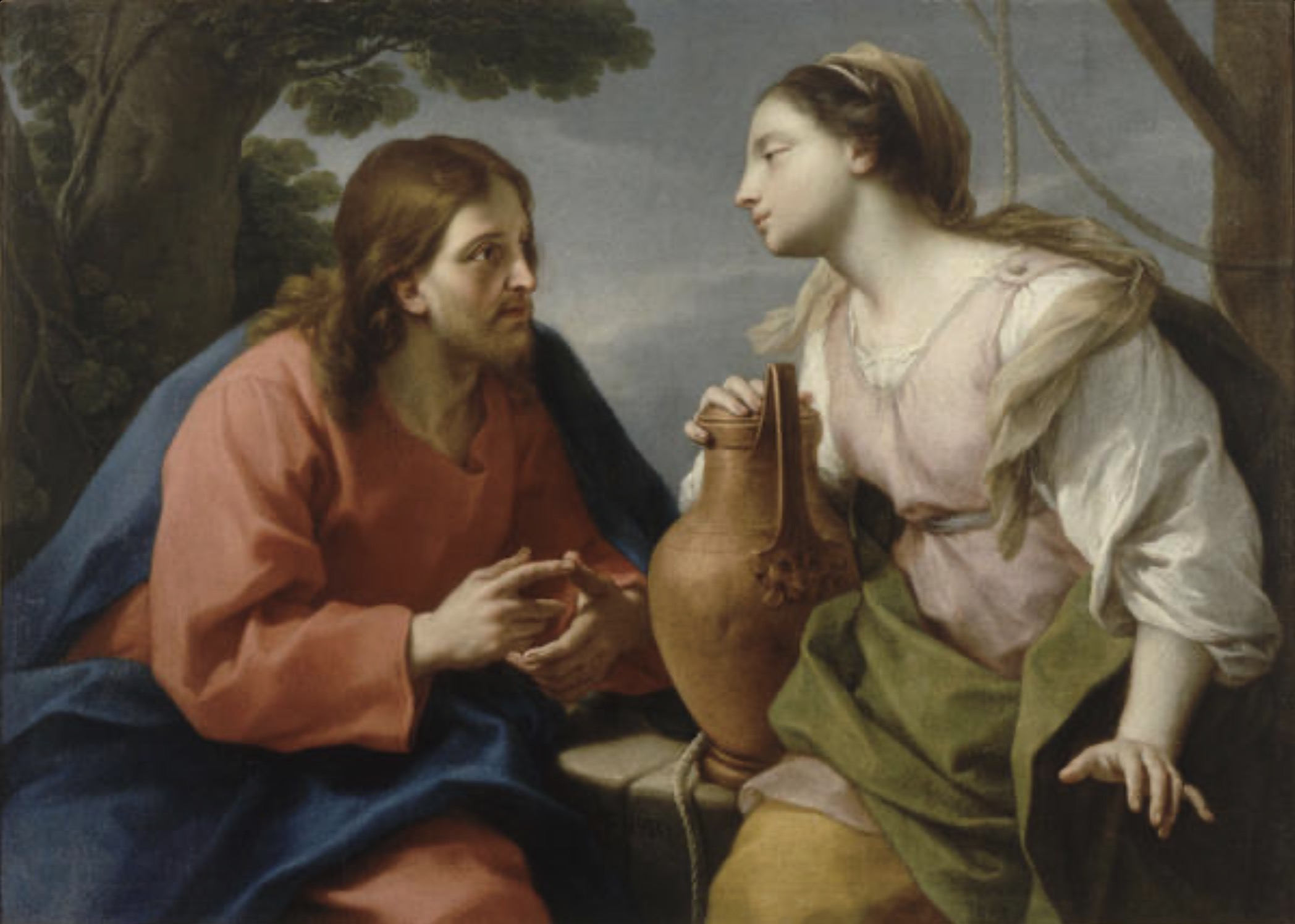
Étienne Parrocel Jésus et la Samaritaine, 18th century

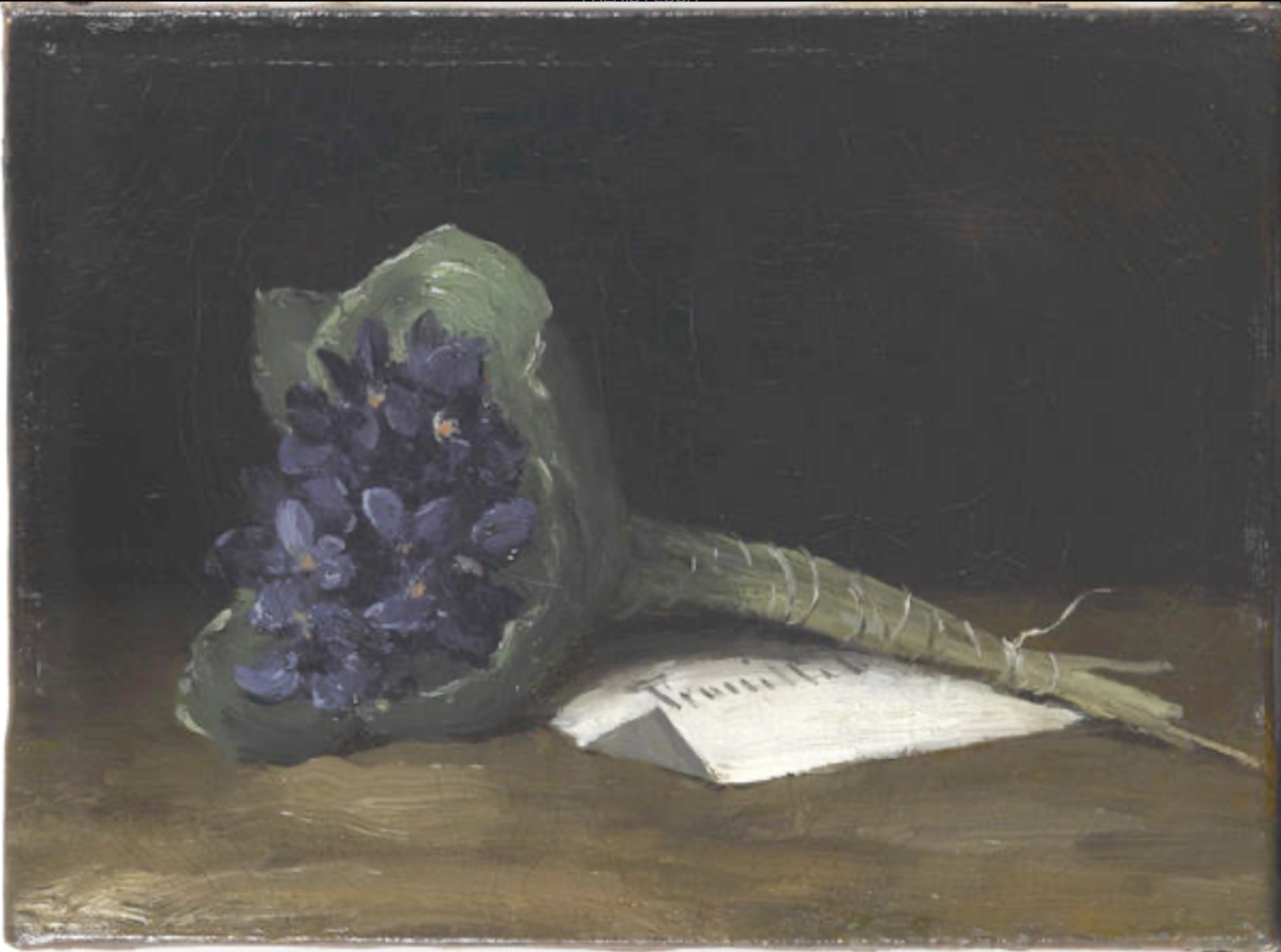
Paul Trouillebert Bouquet of Violets With a Calling Card, c. 1880

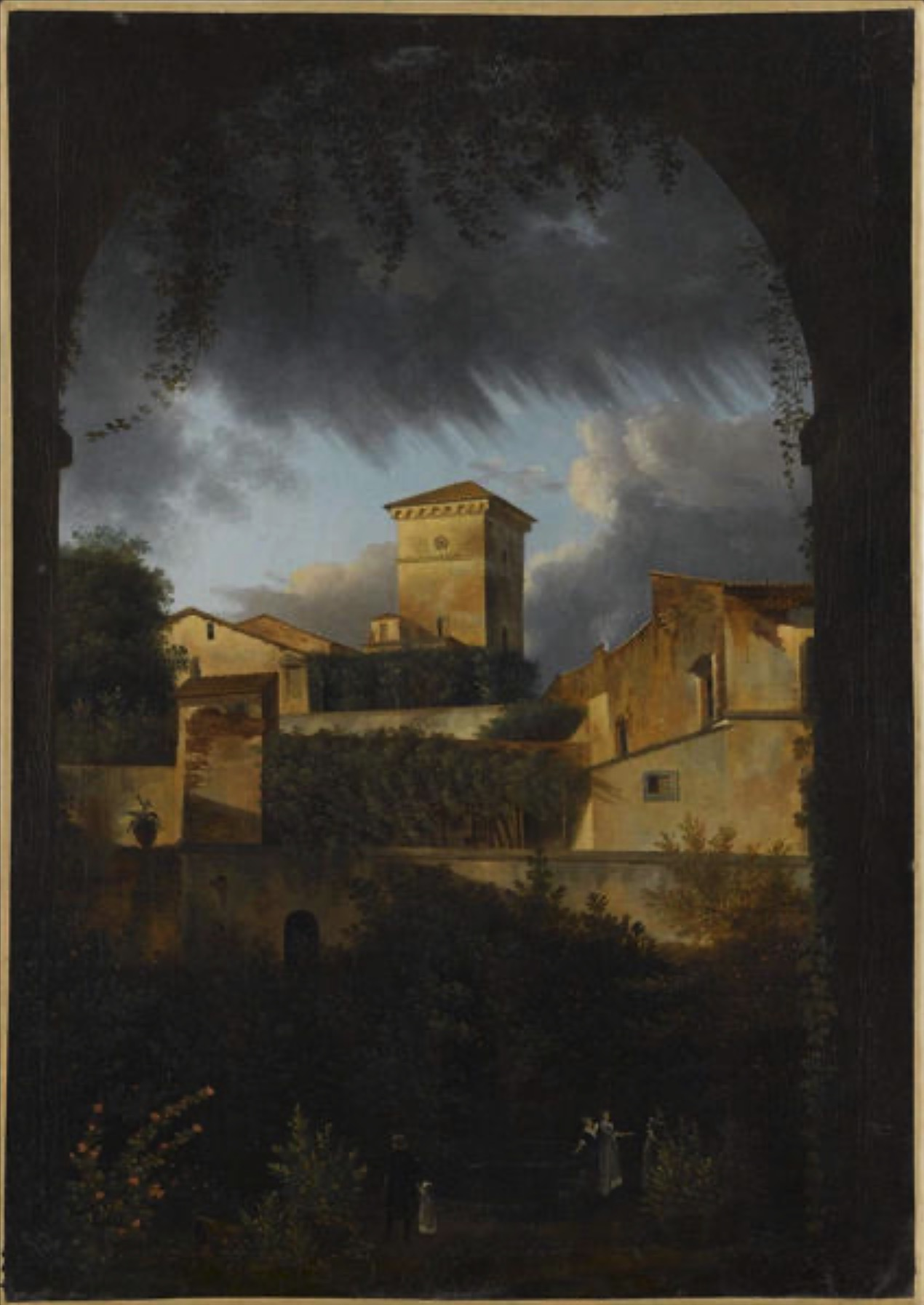
François-Marius Granet Paysage Romain, c. 1830

== See also ==
- Fesch family

== Bibliography ==
- Abram, David (1 May 2009). The Rough Guide to Corsica. Rough Guides. ISBN 978-1-4053-8386-8.
- Baedeker, K. (1891). Southern France: From the Loire to the Spanish and Italian Frontiers, Including Corsica; Handbook for Travellers (Public domain ed.). K. Baedeker.
- Fodor's (2011). Fodor's European Ports of Call. Fodor's Travel Publications. ISBN 978-0-307-48051-4.
