= John Jacob Faesch =

John Jacob Faesch (1729 – 1799) was a Swiss ironmaster who established the Mount Hope Iron Furnace in the Mount Hope village section of Rockaway Township, New Jersey in 1772 which played an important role in providing munitions and tools during the Revolutionary War.

Faesch established himself as an early patriot to the American cause. He was appointed as a Morris County judge, justice of the peace and later one of three Morris County delegates to the New Jersey State Convention that ratified the United States Constitution in 1787.

Faesch was born Johann Jakob Faesch in 1729 in Basel, Switzerland and had emigrated to the United States in 1764. In his later years he relocated to Boonton, New Jersey and died at Morristown, New Jersey on 29 May 1799.

== Sources ==
- Ernest Kraus, "John Jacob Faesch, Morris County Iron Master," The North Jersey Highlander, vol. 15, no. 3 (Fall 1974): 3-41.
- William S. Bayley, Iron Mines and Mining in New Jersey, Final Report Series of the State Geologist, vol. 7 (Trenton, NJ" Geological Survey of New Jersey, 1910), 408-409.
- ?Cook, 1911
