= Faesch family =

Faesch
- Country: Canton of Basel; French Empire; Papal States
- Founded: 1409
- Titles: Hereditary Burgher of Basel; Sovereign Prince; Prince of France; Prince of the Papal States
- Style: Serene Highness
- Estate: Palais Fesch

The Faesch family, also spelled Fesch, is a prominent Swiss, French, Belgian, Corsican and Italian noble family, originally a patrician family of Basel. Known since the early 15th century, the family received a confirmation of nobility from the Holy Roman Emperor in 1563. It was continuously represented in the governing bodies of the city-republic of Basel for centuries, and three members served as Burgomasters, i.e. heads of state, namely Remigius Faesch (1541–1610), Johann Rudolf Faesch (1572–1659) and Johann Rudolf Faesch (1680–1762). The family was at times the richest family of Basel, and its rise was partially the result of clever marriage policies.

In the 18th century, the naval officer Franz Fesch (1711–1775) entered the service of the Republic of Genoa and established a branch in Corsica. Its most famous member, Cardinal Joseph Fesch (1763–1839), was the uncle of Napoleon Bonaparte and was a member of the French imperial family during his nephew's rule. He became a French senator and a count in 1805, was elevated to sovereign princely rank in 1806, and was granted the title of a Prince of France in 1807, a dignity held only by himself, Napoleon's siblings, Joachim Murat and Eugène de Beauharnais. He was a member of the Imperial House and in the order of succession to the French imperial throne in accordance with the French constitution of 1804 (Title III, Article 9, "The Imperial Family"). He was also made a Peer of France in 1815, and subsequently given the title of (Roman) Prince by the Pope. The Fesch Palace in Ajaccio today houses the Musée Fesch, one of France's finest collections of old masters and one of the most important Napoleonic collections.

Family members have lived in Switzerland, Corsica, Italy, France and Belgium. Many family members have been notable as jurists, bankers or military officers. Isaak Faesch (1687–1758) was governor of the Dutch Antilles 1740–1758.

== History ==
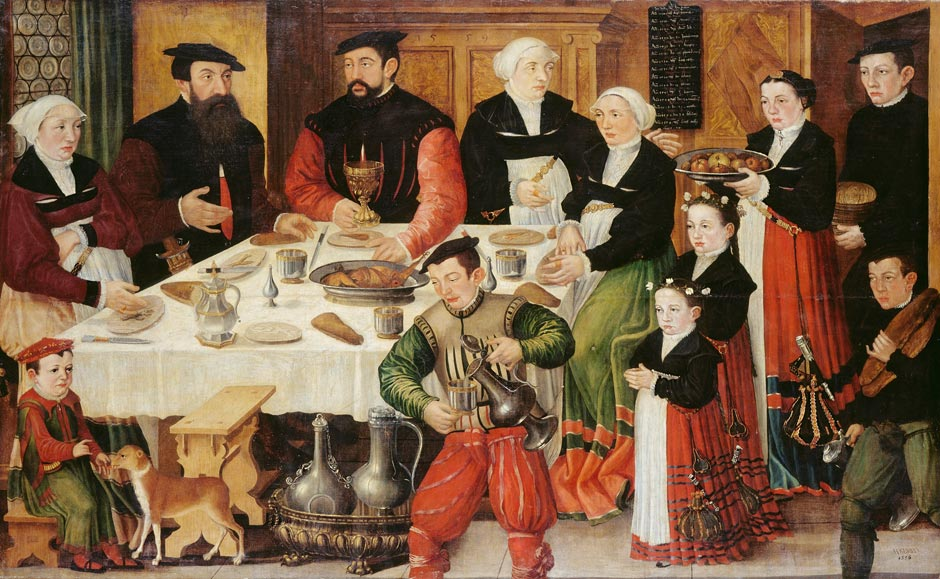
Goldsmith Hans Rudolf Faesch (1510–1564) and his family, painted in 1559 by Hans Hug Kluber (Kunstmuseum Basel). He received a confirmation of nobility from Ferdinand I, Holy Roman Emperor in 1563.

The family is said to be of ancient nobility from Valais in Switzerland. Two brothers of the family acquired the hereditary burghership of Basel in 1409. Family members became members of the council, and thus the ruling class of the city-republic of Basel, from 1494. Members of the family served continuously in the government of the city from the mid 16th century until the end of the 18th century. Several family members also became Burgomaster's and thus heads of the republic, and others became Rectors of the University of Basel. The family intermarried for centuries with other prominent patrician families. Remigius Faesch (ca. 1460–1533) was a famous architect.

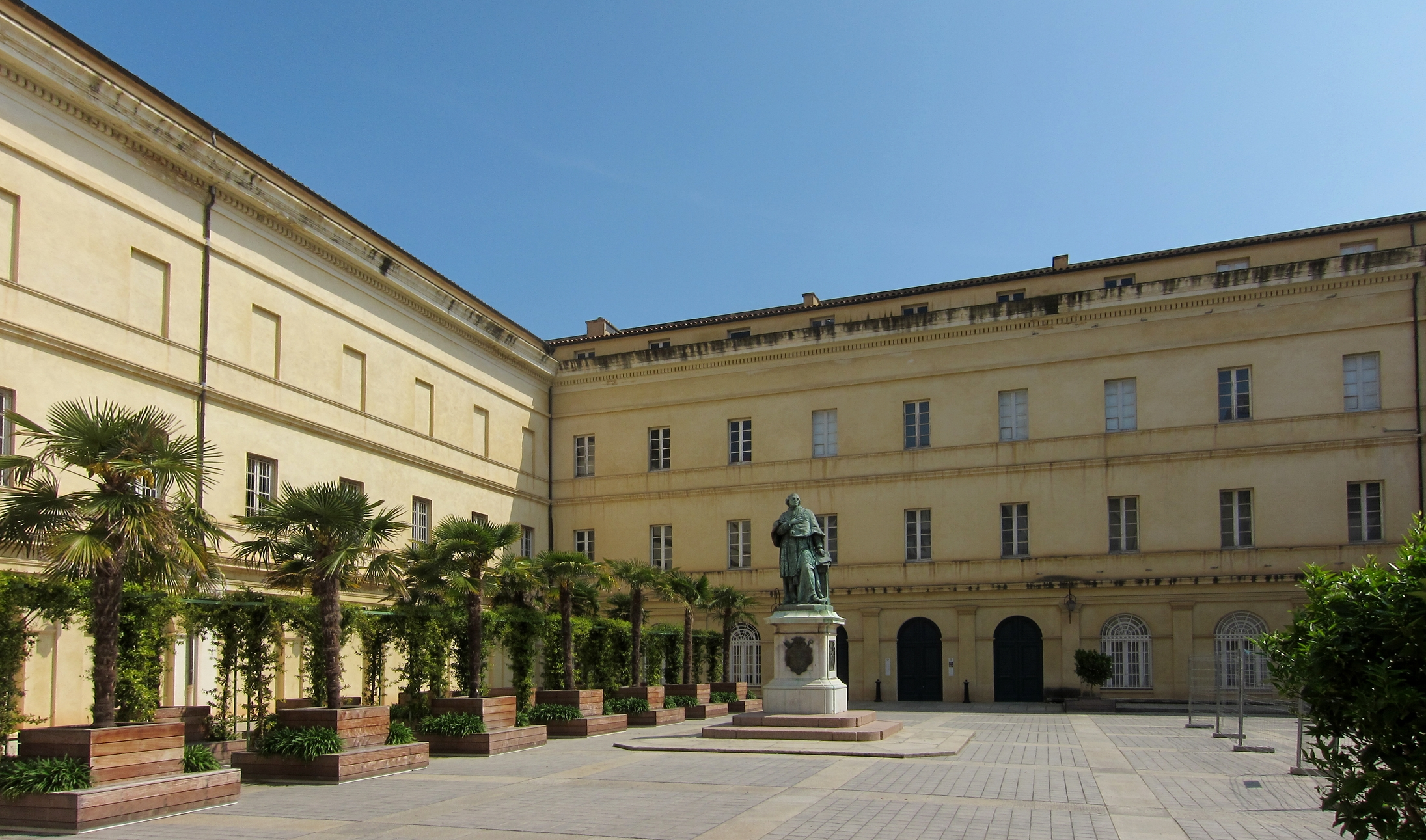
The Fesch Palace in Ajaccio, today the Musée Fesch

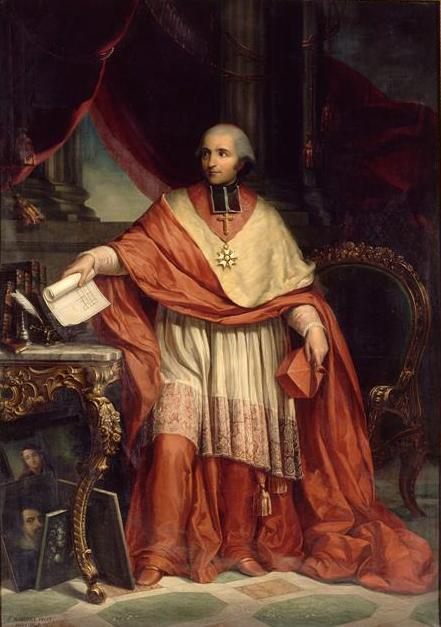
Cardinal Joseph Fesch, Prince of France

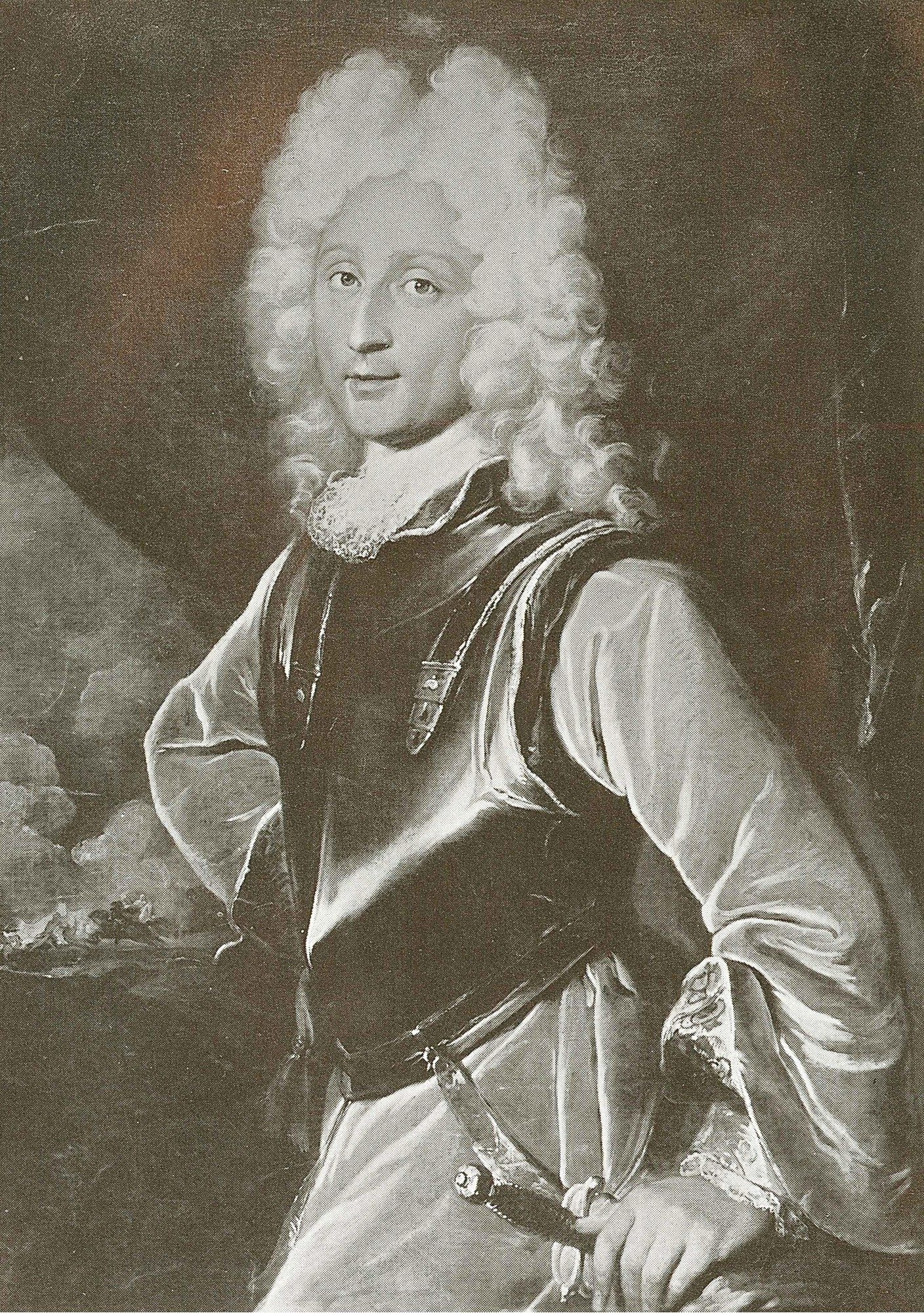
Johann Rudolf Faesch (1680–1762), Burgomaster of Basel

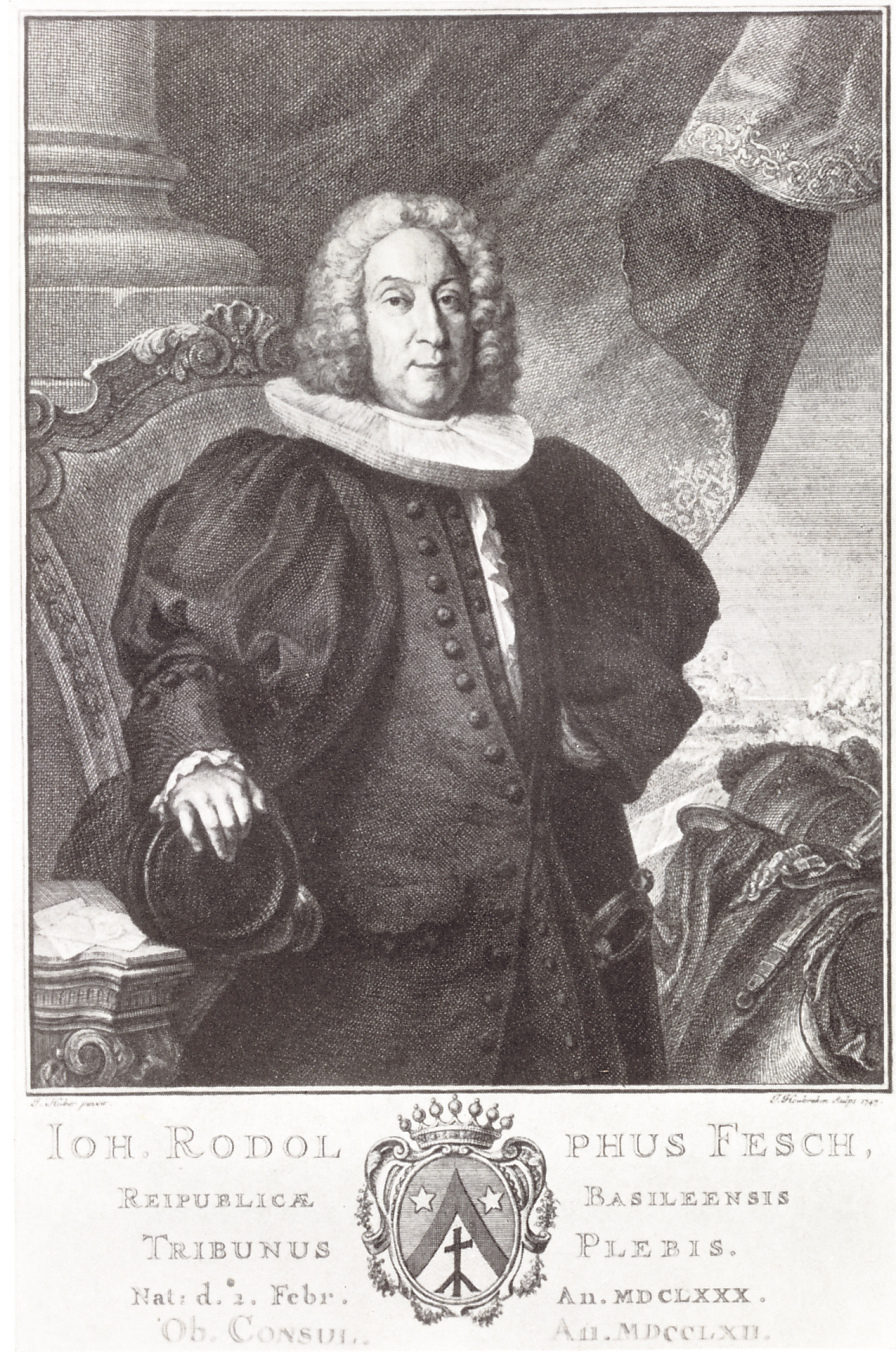
Johann Rudolf Faesch (1680–1762), Burgomaster of Basel

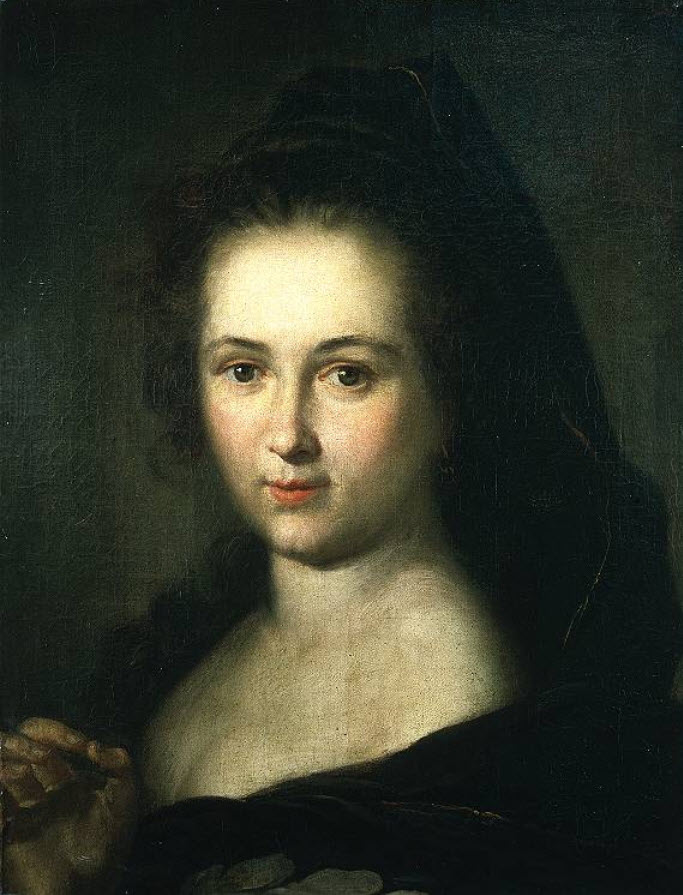
Anna Catharina Faesch (1671–1719), wife of Johann Rudolf Huber, painted by her husband

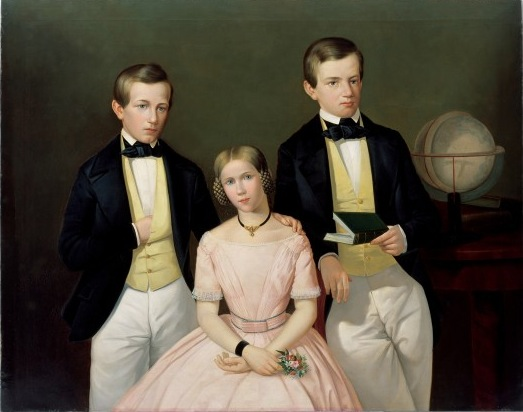
Three siblings of the Faesch family in Basel in 1849

The goldsmith and member of the city council Hans Rudolf Faesch (1510–1564) was ennobled by Ferdinand I, Holy Roman Emperor in 1563 and received a confirmation of the family arms that added two stars to their crest. Thus the family held a dual status as patricians or members of the Daig of the burgher republic of Basel, and as nobles of the Holy Roman Empire.

As of 1659, the Faesch family was the richest family of Basel with a fortune of nearly 250,000 florins. Their family foundation still exists. The jurist, rector of the University of Basel and art collector Remigius Faesch (1595–1667) founded Museum Faesch, an art museum. Its collection became part of the University of Basel in 1823.

Several family members entered the service of various European princes. The diplomat Johann Rudolph Faesch (1669–1751) was an adviser to the Margrave of Baden, representative of the Elector of Trier and the Duke of Württemberg at the Court of France. Many family members were also notable as military officers.

The family converted to Protestantism in 1530, although the Corsica branch would later return to Catholicism, providing a Cardinal.

A branch of the family settled in Geneva in the 19th century, where Alphonse François Faesch became a judge. His son, the engineer Jules Faesch, became a co-owner of the Faesch and Piccard company, and married Amélie de Senarclens de Vuflens (1842-1910), who inherited Vufflens Castle from her father.

=== Fesch as part of the imperial family of France ===
Franz Faesch (born 1711 in Basel, died 1775) became a naval officer (captain) in the service of the Republic of Genoa, posted to Corsica, and married Nobile Angela Maria Pietrasanta (born 1725, died 1790). Their son Joseph Fesch (born 1763 in Ajaccio, died 1839 in Rome) was the half-brother of Letizia Ramolino (a daughter of Angela Maria's first marriage) and through his sister the uncle of Napoleon Bonaparte. He fulfilled the role of protector of the Bonaparte family for some years from 1791. Joseph Fesch became Archbishop of Lyon in 1802, was named a Cardinal in 1803, became French Ambassador to Rome in 1804, became a French senator and count in 1805, became Grand Almoner of France in 1805, obtained the rank of a sovereign prince with the style of Most Eminent Highness as he was chosen as coadjutor of the Prince-Bishopric of Regensburg in 1806, was named a French Prince (prince français) with the style of Serene Highness in 1807, received the Great Eagle (the highest degree) of the Legion of Honour, was a Knight of the Order of the Golden Spur (1802), a Knight of the Order of the Golden Fleece (1805), became a Peer of France in 1815 and subsequently a (Roman) Prince (as a noble title in the Papal States). Joseph Fesch was also one of the most famous art collectors of his lifetime. He wed his nephew Napoleon to Joséphine de Beauharnais in Paris in 1804, the day before Napoleon crowned himself as Emperor of the French. Cardinal Fesch lived out his days at the Palazzo Falconieri in Rome, dedicating himself to art and to beneficence.

== Notable family members ==
- Caroline Weldon, née Faesch (1844–1921), American civil rights activist, Indian rights activist of the late 19th century,
- Remigius Faesch (builder) (about 1460–1533/1534), builder of the late Gothic era
- Christoph Faesch (1611–1683), historian
- John Jacob Faesch (1729-1799), black smith and iron master, patriot of the American Revolution
- Johannes Faesch (1779–1856), merchant
- Jules Faesch (1833–1895), engineer
- Emil Faesch (1865–1915), architect
- Isaac Faesch (1687–1758), merchant and governor of the Dutch Antilles 1740–1758
- Emil Faesch (1865–1915), architect
- Jacques Fesch (1930-1957), convicted murderer turned Catholic religious mystic and Servant of God.

The Fesch Palace in Ajaccio as of 2014 houses the Musée Fesch.

== Coat of arms ==
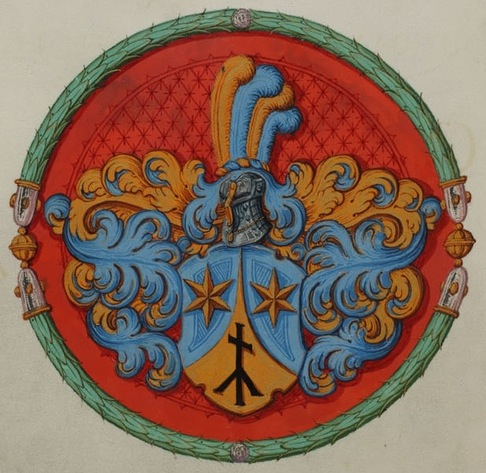
Coat of arms of Johann Jakob Faesch, rector of the University of Basel, 1612

Faesch family coat of arms

Faesch family coat of arms with a baronial coronet as used by family members, as the family was ennobled by the Holy Roman Emperor in 1563. The two stars were added on the occasion of the ennoblement.

Arms of Cardinal Joseph Fesch as a member of the French imperial family, Grand Almoner of France and a prince of the Empire

== Literature ==
- Friedrich Wilhelm Bautz (1990). "Faesch family". In Bautz, Friedrich Wilhelm (ed.). Biographisch-Bibliographisches Kirchenlexikon (BBKL) (in German). Vol. 2. Hamm: Bautz. cols. 22–23. ISBN 3-88309-032-8.
- Jean Baptiste Lyonnet: Le Cardinal Fesch, archevêque de Lyon, primat des Gaules, etc., etc. Fragments biographiques, politiques et religieux pour servir à l'histoire ecclésiastique contemporaine. 2 Bde., Lyon-Paris, Perisse, 1841.
- Samuel Schüpbach-Guggenbühl: "Faesch family" in German, French and Italian in the online Historical Dictionary of Switzerland.
