= Remigius Faesch =

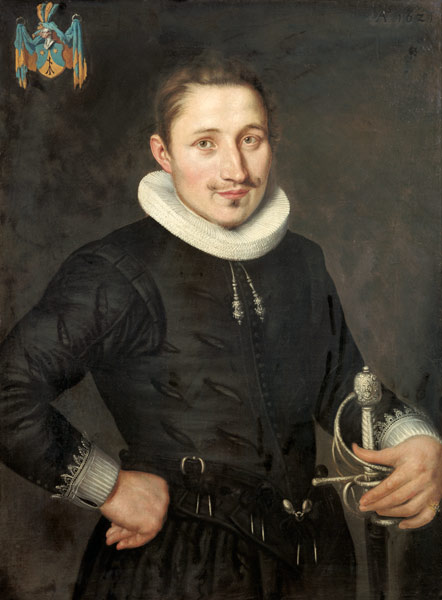
Remigius Faesch by Bartholomaeus Sarburgh

Remigius Faesch. (26 May 1595- 27 February 1667) was a Swiss jurist and rector of the University of Basel.

Remigius Faesch was born into the Faesch family in Basel. His father Hans Rufolf Faesch was a silk merchant and mayor of Basel. He was married to Rosa Irmi, the granddaughter of the former Mayor of Basel Jakob Meyer zum Hasen. Between 1614 and 1616 Remigius studied law in the cities Geneva and Paris, but graduated in Basel. In 1620/21 he made an extended journey to Italy. From 1628 onwards he taught law at the University of Basel, and was elected its rector three times in years 1637–38, 1649–50 and 1660–61. Together with other professors of the University of Basel he demanded the purchase of the Amerbach Cabinet, by the city of Basel. This happened in 1661 with the support of the Mayor of Basel Johann Rudolf Wettstein. Besides he was the founder of the so-called Faeschisches Kabinett, a private museum which in 1823 became a part of the Kunstmuseum Basel. He also re-published the Institutionum Imperialium analysis by Julius Pacius a Beriga.
