= Grand Almoner of France =

Religious officer in the French royal household

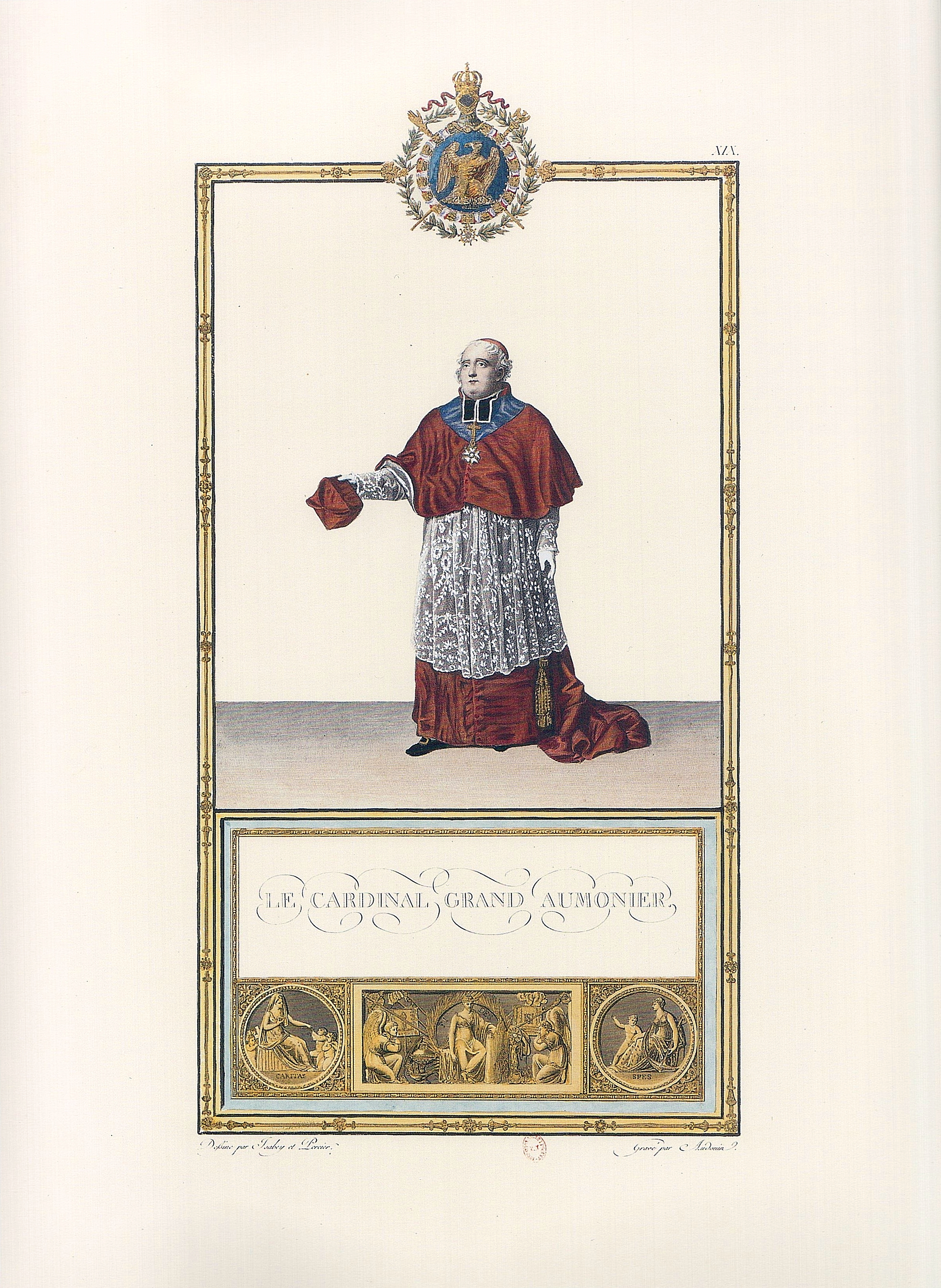
Joseph Fesch, Cardinal Grand Almoner under Napoleon I.

The Grand Almoner of France (French: Grand aumônier de France) was an officer of the French monarchy and a member of the Maison du Roi ("King's Household") during the Ancien Régime. He directed the religious branch of the royal household (the Ecclesiastical Household, French: Maison ecclésiastique du roi de France) also known as the Royal Chapel.

The title "Grand Almoner" was created by King Francis I. The office was not included in the official list of Great Officers of the Crown of France established by Henri III in 1582, but some specialists of the French monarchy place the position among the Great Offices.

The Grand Almoner played above all a symbolic role as the most important member of the church in the royal court. Often having a church rank of bishop, more rarely that of cardinal, the Grand Almoner had a number of important privileges, including oversight of charity organizations in Paris and the right to the silver service of the royal chapel at the death of the king. The Grand Almoner also gave communion to the King and performed baptisms and princely marriages. The position was largely dominated by a few aristocratic families, such as the House of Rohan.

The position was roughly equivalent to the position of Lord High Almoner in the United Kingdom, who oversees the U.K. Ecclesiastical Household and Chapel Royal.

== List of Grand Almoners of France ==
Grand Almoners of the King

- 1486-1514 : Geoffroi III de Pompadour, Bishop of Puy-en-Velay, Count of Velay.
- 1514-1515 : François Le Roy de Chavigny (died after 1514).
- 1516-1519 : Adrien Gouffier de Boisy (died 1523), Cardinal, Bishop of Coutances and Albi.
- 1519-1526 : François Desmoulins de Rochefort, prieur commendataire of the Saint-Magloire de Léhon Abbey in 1524.
- 1526-1543 : Jean Le Veneur (died 1543), Count-Bishop of Lisieux, Cardinal in 1533.
- 1543-1547 : Antoine Sanguin de Meudon (died 1559), Cardinal, Bishop of Orléans (1533) and Limoges (1544), Archbishop of Toulouse (1551).
- 1547-1548 : Philippe de Cossé-Brissac (1509-1548), Bishop of Coutances (1530).
- 1548-1552 : Pierre du Chastel (died 1553), Bishop of Tulle (1539), Mâcon (1544) and Orléans (1551).

Grand Almoners of France

- 1552-1556 : Bernard de Ruthie (died 1556), Abbot of Pontlevoy Abbey.
- 1556-1559 : Louis de Brézé (died 1589), Bishop of Meaux.
- 1559-1560 : Charles d'Humières (died 1571), Bishop of Bayeux.
- 1560-1591 : Jacques Amyot (1513-1593), Bishop of Auxerre in 1570.
- 1591-1606 : Renaud de Beaune (1527-1606), Archbishop of Bourges until 1602 and Archbishop of Sens in 1594.
- 1606-1618 : Jacques Davy Duperron (1556-1618), Cardinal, Archbishop of Sens.
- 1618-1632 : François de La Rochefoucauld, Cardinal, Bishop of Senlis.
- 1632-1653 : Alphonse de Richelieu (1582-1653), Cardinal, Archbishop of Lyon and Primat des Gaules.
- 1653-1671 : Antonio Barberini (1607-1671), Italian Cardinal, Bishop of Poitiers then Archbishop of Reims in 1657.
- 1671-1700 : Emmanuel-Théodose de La Tour d'Auvergne (1643-1715), Cardinal, Bishop of Albano in 1689.
- 1700-1706 : Pierre du Cambout (1636-1706), Cardinal, Bishop of Orléans, duc de Coislin.
- 1706-1713 : Toussaint de Forbin-Janson (1629-1713), Cardinal, Count-Bishop of Beauvais.
- 1713-1742 : Gaston de Rohan (1674-1749), Cardinal, Prince-Bishop of Strasbourg.
- 1742-1745 : Frédéric Jérôme de La Rochefoucauld (1701-1757), Archbishop of Bourges.
- 1745-1748 : François-Armand de Rohan-Soubise (1717-1756), prince-abbot of Lure and Murbach, Cardinal in 1747.
- 1748-1759 : Nicolas-Charles de Saulx-Tavannes (1690-1759), Archbishop of Rouen, Cardinal in 1756.
- 1760-1777 : Charles Antoine de La Roche-Aymon (1697-1777), Archbishop of Narbonne then Archbishop of Reims in 1762 and Cardinal in 1771.
- 1777-1786 : Louis-René de Rohan (1734-1803), Cardinal in 1778 and prince-Bishop of Strasbourg in 1779.
- 1786-1791 : Louis-Joseph de Montmorency-Laval (1724-1808), Prince-Bishop of Metz, Cardinal in 1789. He held the title of Grand Almoner for the (then titular) King Louis XVIII until his death in 1808.

First French Empire

- 1805-1814 : Joseph Fesch (1763-1839), Cardinal, Archbishop of Lyon and Primate of the Gauls.

Restauration and July Monarchy

- 1814-1821 : Alexandre-Angélique de Talleyrand-Périgord (1736-1821), Archbishop of Reims, Cardinal and Archbishop of Paris in 1817. He received the title of Grand Almoner in 1808 by King Louis XVIII (then titular King)
- 1821-1844 : Gustave Maximilien Juste de Croÿ (1773-1844), Bishop of Strasbourg then Archbishop of Rouen in 1823, Cardinal in 1825.

Second French Empire

- 1857-1862 : François Morlot (1795-1862), Cardinal and Archbishop of Paris.
- 1863-1871 : Georges Darboy (1813-1871), Archbishop of Paris.

== See also ==
- Great Officers of the Crown of France
- Maison du Roi
- Almoner
