= Joseph Fesch =

French priest and diplomat (1763–1839)

His Most Eminent Highness Joseph Fesch
- Cardinal, Archbishop of Lyon; Sovereign Prince; Prince of the Empire; Peer of France; Roman Prince
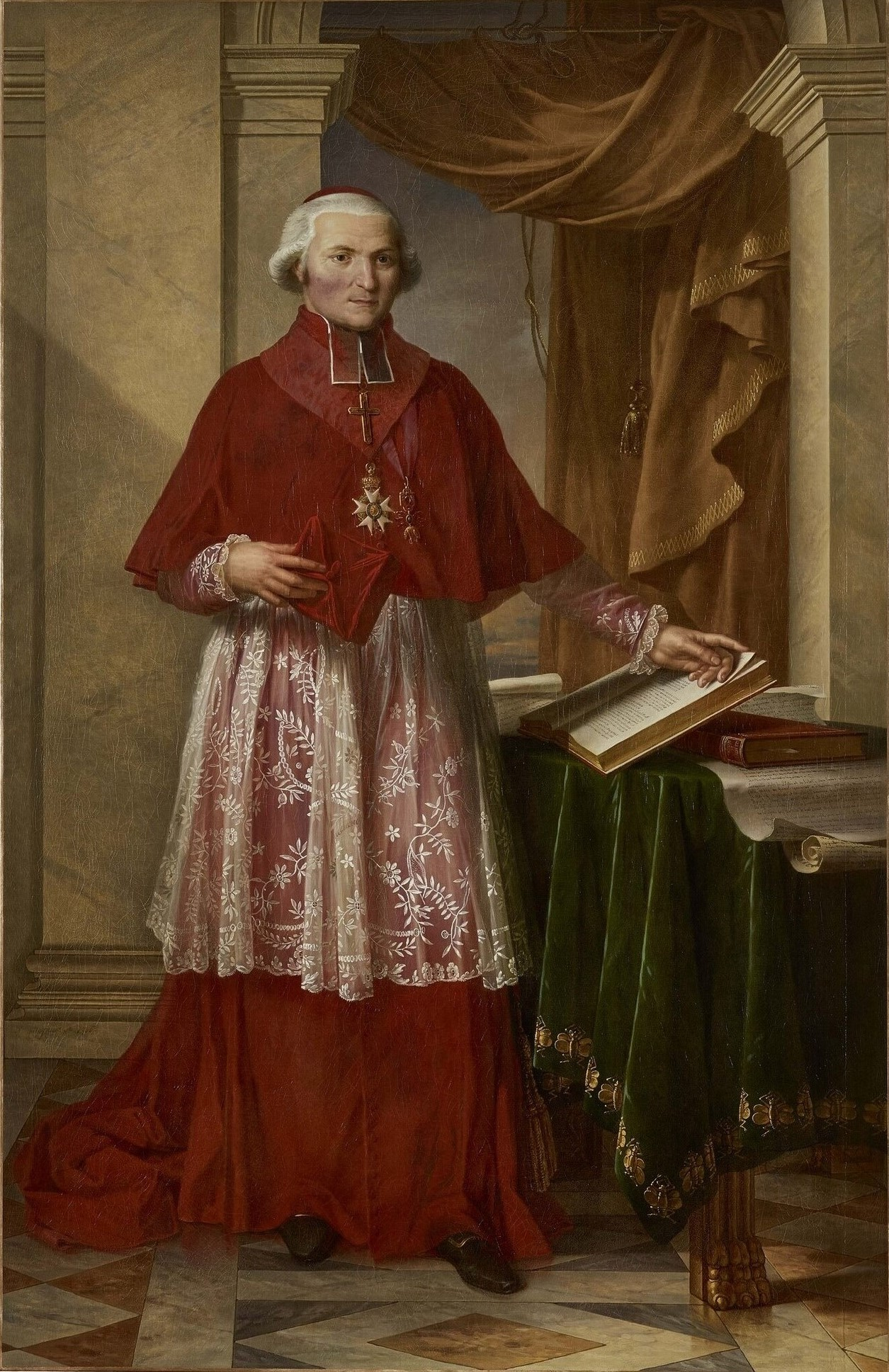
- 1806 portrait of Fesch by Charles Meynier
- See: Lyon
- Installed: 15 August 1802
- Term ended: 13 May 1839
- Other posts: Cardinal-Priest of Santa Maria della Vittoria (1803–1822); in commendam (1822–1839); Cardinal-Priest of San Lorenzo in Lucina; Grand Almoner of France (1805 - 1814)

Orders
- Ordination: 1787
- Consecration: 15 August 1802 by Giovanni Battista Caprara
- Created cardinal: 17 January 1803 by Pius VII
- Rank: Cardinal-Priest

Personal details
- Born: 3 January 1763 Ajaccio, Republic of Genoa
- Died: 13 May 1839 (aged 76) Rome, Papal States
- Denomination: Roman Catholic

- Coat of arms

Joseph Cardinal Fesch, Prince of the Empire (3 January 1763 – 13 May 1839) was a French priest and diplomat, who was the maternal half-uncle of Napoleon Bonaparte (half-brother of Napoleon's mother Laetitia). In the wake of his nephew's rise, he became Archbishop of Lyon and cardinal. He was also one of the most famous art collectors of his period, remembered for having established the Musée Fesch in Ajaccio, which remains one of the most important Napoleonic collections of art.

Born in Corsica, he was the son of Swiss-born Franz Faesch and Angela Maria Pietrasanta, and belonged on his father's side to the Faesch family, one of the most prominent patrician families of Basel. He rose to great prominence in France following Napoleon's coup d'état of 1799. Fesch became Archbishop of Lyon in 1802, a Cardinal in 1803, Ambassador to the Holy See in 1804, a French senator and count in 1805, Grand Almoner of France in 1805, a sovereign prince in 1806, Prince of the Empire ("French Prince") in 1807 (a dignity he shared only with Napoleon's siblings, brother-in-law Joachim Murat, and adopted son Eugène de Beauharnais), and Peer of France in 1815, and was named a Prince of the Papal States by the Pope. He was a member of the Imperial House, and was included in the order of succession to the French imperial throne in accordance with the French constitution of 1804 (Title III, Article 9, "The Imperial Family").

He was Napoleon's most important diplomat in regard to Pope Pius VII, but Napoleon's relationship with his uncle deteriorated as his relationship with the Pope soured. Nevertheless, Napoleon remained loyal to his uncle. Fesch wed his nephew to Joséphine de Beauharnais in Paris in 1804, the day before Bonaparte was crowned as Emperor of the French, in 1810 he wed Napoleon to Marie Louise of Austria, and in 1811 baptized the Emperor's son Napoleon II.

After the end of the French Empire in 1815, he was banished from France in 1815, like the rest of the Imperial House. He relocated to Rome with his half-sister Laetitia, and took up residence at the Palazzo Falconieri, dedicating himself to art and to beneficence.

== Biography ==
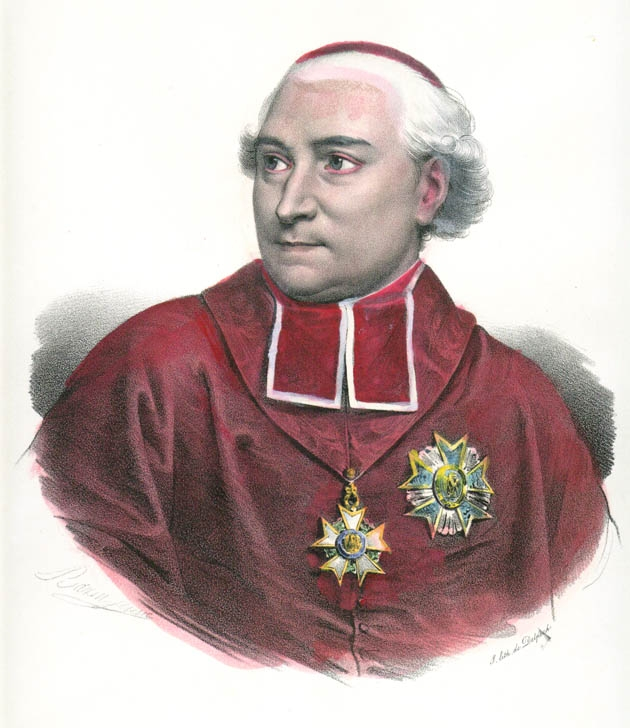
Cardinal Joseph Fesch.

Fesch was born at Ajaccio in Corsica. His father was Franz Faesch, a Swiss officer in the service of the Republic of Genoa, whose family belonged to the Basel patriciate and had been ennobled in the Holy Roman Empire in 1562. His mother was Nobile Angela Maria Pietrasanta. His mother had previously been married to Captain Giovanni Geronimo Ramolino, and he had an elder half-sister, Letizia Ramolino, later the mother of Napoleon. With the support of Luciano Buonaparte (1718–1791), archdeacon of Ajaccio, he entered the seminary at Aix-en-Provence in 1781. He was ordained as a priest in 1785, and at 24 years old, he became the archdeacon of Ajaccio. After the 1791 death of Luciano Buonaparte, he became for a time the protector and patron of his sister's family. In 1789, when the French Revolution broke out, he felt, like the majority of the Corsicans, repugnance for many of the acts of the French government during that period; in particular, he protested against the application to Corsica of the act known as the Civil Constitution of the Clergy (July 1790). As provost of the "chapter" in that city, he directly felt the pressure of events; for on the suppression of religious orders and corporations, he was constrained to retire into private life.

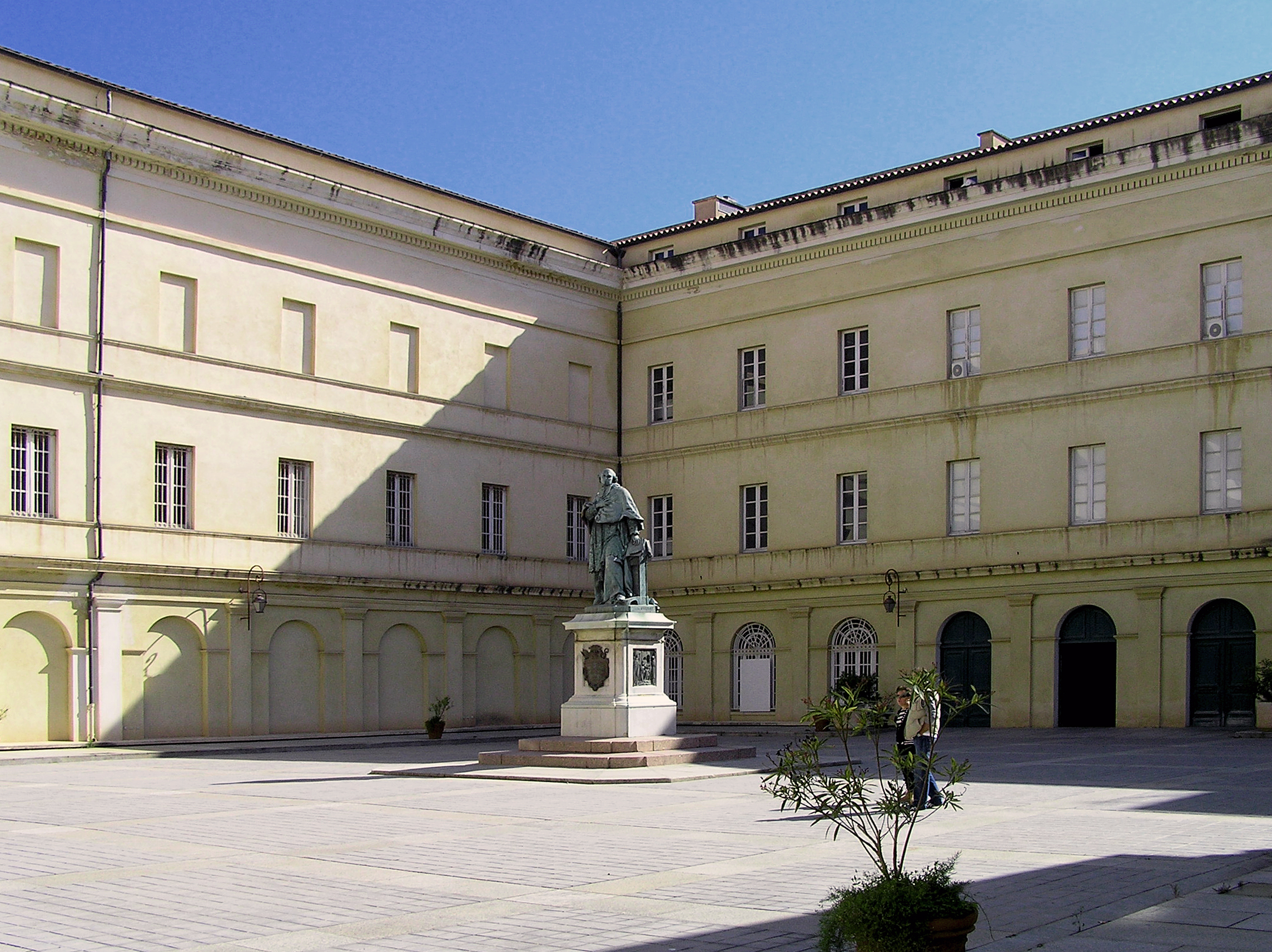
Palais Fesch, Ajaccio, now houses the Musée Fesch

Thereafter, he shared the fortunes of the Bonaparte family in the intrigues and strifes which ensued. Drawn gradually into espousing the French cause against Pasquale Paoli and the Anglophiles, he was forced to leave Corsica and to proceed with Laetitia and her son to Toulon, in early autumn, 1793. Failing to find clerical duties at that time (the Reign of Terror), he took several posts in civil life, until on the appointment of Napoleon Bonaparte to the command of the French "Army of Italy" he became a commissary attached to that army. This part of his career is obscure, but his fortunes rose rapidly when Napoleon became First Consul, after the coup d'état of 18 Brumaire (November 1799). When the restoration of the Roman Catholic religion was in the mind of the First Consul, Fesch resumed his clerical vocation and took an active part in the complex negotiations which led to the signing of the Concordat with the Holy See on 15 July 1801. His reward came in being made Archbishop of Lyon in August 1802. Six months later, he received a further reward for his past services, being raised to the dignity of cardinal.

Appointed by Napoleon on 4 April 1803 to succeed François Cacault on the latter's retirement from the position of French ambassador at Rome, Fesch was assisted by Chateaubriand, but soon sharply differed with him on many questions. Towards the close of 1804, Napoleon entrusted to Fesch the difficult task of securing the presence of Pope Pius VII at the forthcoming coronation of the emperor at Notre Dame, Paris (2 December 1804). His tact in overcoming the reluctance of the pope (it was only eight months after the execution of the duc d'Enghien) received further recognition. He received the grand cordon of the Legion d'Honneur, became grand-almoner of the empire and had a seat in the French senate. He was to receive further honours. In 1806, one of the most influential of the German clerics, Karl von Dalberg, then prince-bishop of Regensburg, chose him to be his coadjutor and designated him as his successor.

Subsequent events damaged his prospects. In the course of the years 1806-1807, Napoleon came into sharp collision with the pope on various matters, both political and religious. Fesch sought in vain to reconcile them. Napoleon was inexorable in his demands, and Pius VII refused to give way where the discipline and vital interests of the church seemed to be threatened. The emperor several times rebuked Fesch for what he thought to be weakness and ingratitude. It is clear, however, that the cardinal went as far as possible in counselling the submission of the spiritual to the civil power. For a time, he was not on speaking terms with the pope, and Napoleon recalled him from Rome.

Affairs came to a crisis in the year 1809, when Napoleon issued at Vienna the decree of 17 May, ordering the annexation of the Papal States to the French empire. In that year, Napoleon conferred on Fesch the archbishopric of Paris, but he refused the honour. Fesch did, however, consent to take part in an ecclesiastical commission formed by the emperor from among the dignitaries of the Gallican Church, but in 1810 the commission was dissolved. The hopes of Fesch with respect to Regensburg were also damped by an arrangement of the year 1810 whereby Regensburg was absorbed in Bavaria.

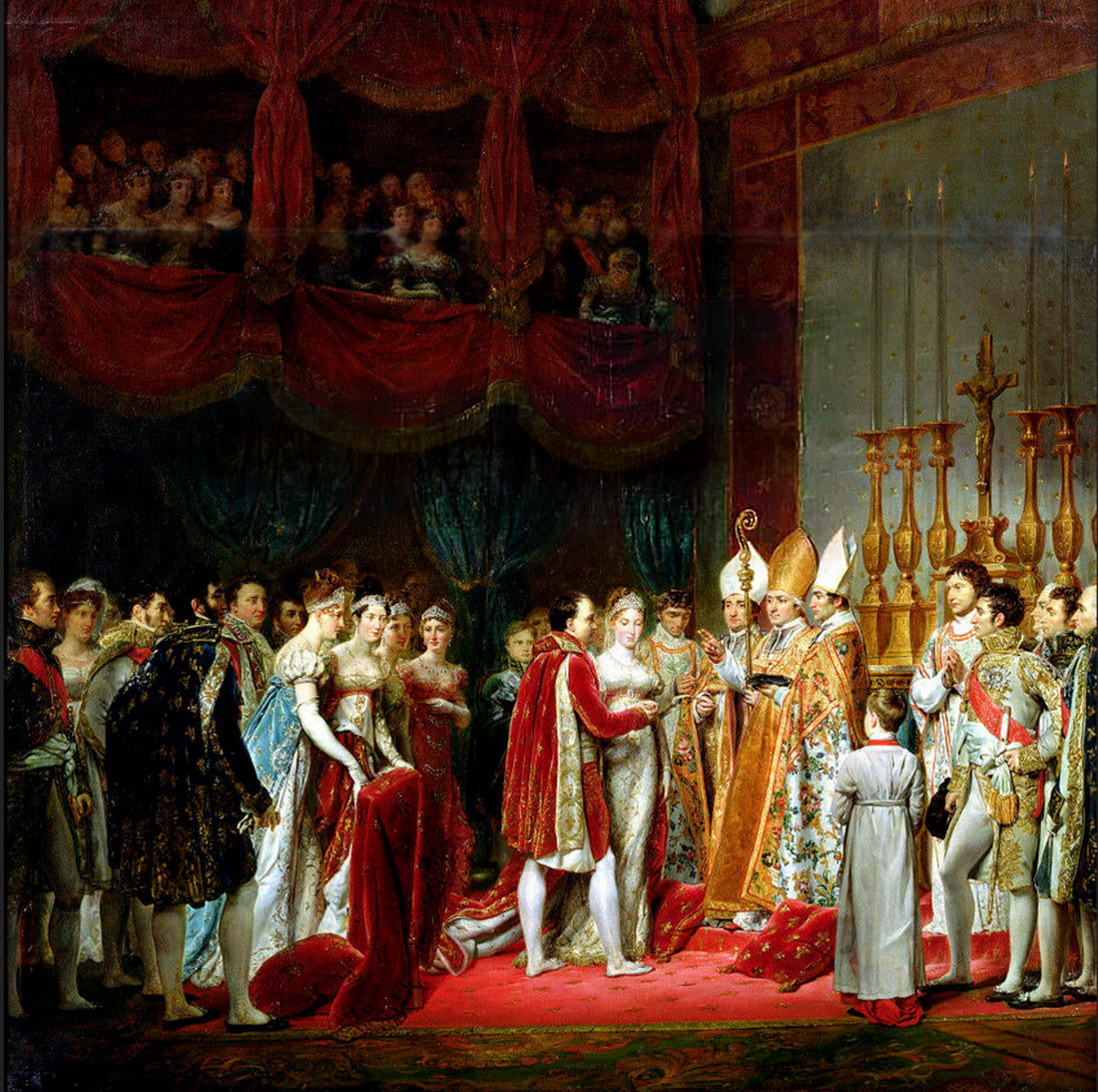
The Wedding of Napoleon and Marie Louise by Georges Rouget, 1810

In the year 1811, the emperor convoked a national council of Gallican clerics for the discussion of church affairs, and Fesch was appointed to preside over their deliberations. Here again, however, he failed to satisfy the inflexible emperor and was dismissed to his diocese. The friction between uncle and nephew became more acute in the following year. In June 1812, Pius VII was brought from his first place of detention, Savona, to Fontainebleau, where he was kept under surveillance in the hope that he would give way in certain matters relating to the Concordat and in other clerical affairs. Fesch ventured to write to the aged pontiff a letter which came into the hands of the emperor. His anger against Fesch was such that he stopped the sum of 150,000 florins which had been accorded to him.

The disasters of the years 1812-1813 brought Napoleon to treat Pius VII more leniently, and the position of Fesch thus became for a time less difficult. However, on the first abdication of Napoleon (11 April 1814) and the restoration of the Bourbons, he retired to Rome, where he received a welcome. The events of the Hundred Days (March–June 1815) brought him back to France; he resumed his archepiscopal duties at Lyon and was further named a member of the senate and a peer of France. On the second abdication of the emperor (22 June 1815), Fesch retired to Rome along with his older sister Letizia. There he spent the rest of his days in dignified ease, surrounded by numerous masterpieces of art, many of which he bequeathed to the cities of Lyon and Ajaccio. He died in Rome in 1839.

== Coat of arms ==
Coat of arms of Cardinal Joseph Fesch

As a member of the imperial family of France, he was given a new coat of arms based on the imperial coat of arms of France (cf. House of Bonaparte). The Faesch family traditionally used a different coat of arms.

== Paintings owned by Fesch ==
The Fesch collection included almost 16,000 paintings (not all at the same time). The core was Italian works of the Renaissance to the 18th century, but Fesch also had a number of Dutch Golden Age paintings and contemporary French works, as well as a number of classical sculptures. Fesch was a fairly early collector of Quattrocento paintings, or "Italian Primitives". The Musée Fesch, Ajaccio, contains much of Fesch's collection, including works by Botticelli, Giovanni Bellini, Titian and others. Some of his collection is contained in the Hôtel de Ville in Ajaccio. Another part, including the works considered most important, was sold by auction in 1845. Paintings not in Lyons or Ajaccio include:

- The Entombment, Michelangelo, National Gallery, London
- The Dream of Saint Joseph, by Philippe de Champaigne, National Gallery, London
- Saint Jerome in the Wilderness, Leonardo da Vinci, Vatican Museums
- Adoration of the Shepherds, Giorgione, NGA, Washington, who also have a Nativity by Perino del Vaga, Saint Martin Dividing His Cloak by Jan Boeckhorst and The Larder by Antonio Maria Vassallo.
- Mond Crucifixion, Raphael, National Gallery, London
- Portrait of a Seated Woman with a Handkerchief, now attributed to Carel Fabritius rather than Rembrandt, Art Gallery of Ontario, Toronto.
- Adoration of the Magi, Bramantino, National Gallery, London, who have other works including a Vincenzo Foppa & a Botticelli.
- Last Judgement Fra Angelico, in the Gemäldegalerie, Berlin.
- The Broken Mirror, Greuze, Wallace Collection, London, who have another Greuze, an Anthony van Dyck Virgin and Child, a Philippe de Champaigne Annunciation, and a Hobbema.
- Hunting in the Lagoon, Vittore Carpaccio, Getty Museum, originally part of the same composition as his Two Venetian Ladies
- Saints George and Dominic, side panels from an altarpiece, Carlo Crivelli, Metropolitan Museum of Art.
- Lamentation of Christ, Scipione Pulzone, MMA.
- The Visitation, Sebastiano del Piombo, Duke of Northumberland's collection at Alnwick Castle.

== Honours ==
- Great Eagle (Grand Cross) of the Legion of Honour.
- Knight of the Order of the Golden Spur (1802)
- Knight of the Order of the Golden Fleece (1805)

== See also ==
- François Carlo Antommarchi
- Napoleon and the Catholic Church

== Sources ==
- The following references are given for the 1911 Encyclopædia Britannica article on Joseph Fesch:
  - Jean Baptiste Lyonnet, Le Cardinal Fesch (2 vols., Lyon, 1841)
  - Louis Gustave Ricard, Le Cardinal Fesch (Paris, 1893)
  - Henri Welschinger, Le Pape et l'empereur, 1804–1815 (Paris, 1905)
  - Frédéric Masson, Napoleon et sa famille (4 vols., Paris, 1897–1900)
- Pierre-Louis-Théophile-Georges Goyau (1913). "Joseph Fesch" . In Herbermann, Charles (ed.). Catholic Encyclopedia. New York: Robert Appleton Company.
