= Imperial House of France (First French Empire) =

The Imperial House of France during the First French Empire was the family of Napoleon, including the House of Bonaparte, who held imperial titles as Emperor, Empress, Imperial Prince, or French Prince, and who were in the order of succession to the French imperial throne in accordance with the French constitution of 1804. According to Title III, Article 9 ("The Imperial Family"), "the members of the imperial family in the order of succession, bear the title of Princes of France (princes français)" and "the eldest son of the Emperor bears the title Prince Imperial (prince impérial)."

The non-Bonapartes who were members of the imperial family were Napoleon's uncle, brother-in-law and stepson of the families Fesch, Murat, and Beauharnais. This article lists their titles of the First French Empire; several held other titles in vassal states.

== Members ==
| Arms | Picture | Name with style and titles |
|---|---|---|
| | | His Imperial Majesty Napoleon, Emperor of the French (Full title as of 1809–1814: His Imperial and Royal Majesty Napoleon I, By the Grace of God and the Constitutions of the Republic, Emperor of the French, King of Italy, Protector of the Confederation of the Rhine, Mediator of the Helvetic Confederation) (House of Bonaparte) |
| | | Her Imperial Majesty Joséphine, Empress of the French, Napoleon's first wife (After her 1810 divorce from Napoleon: Her Imperial Highness Empress Joséphine, Duchess of Navarre) (House of Bonaparte, by birth Tascher de la Pagerie) |
| | | Her Imperial Majesty Marie Louise, Empress of the French, Napoleon's second wife (House of Bonaparte, by birth House of Habsburg-Lorraine) |
| | | His Imperial Highness Napoleon, the Prince Imperial, the King of Rome, Napoleon's son (House of Bonaparte) |
| | | His Imperial Highness Joseph Bonaparte, French Prince, Napoleon's brother (House of Bonaparte) |
| | | His Imperial Highness Louis Bonaparte, French Prince, Napoleon's brother (House of Bonaparte) |
| | | His Imperial Highness Joachim Murat, French Prince, Napoleon's brother-in-law (House of Murat) |
| | | His Imperial Highness Eugène de Beauharnais, French Prince, Napoleon's stepson (House of Beauharnais) |
| | | Her Imperial Highness Elisa Bonaparte, French Princess, Napoleon's sister (House of Bonaparte) |
| | | His Imperial Highness Jérôme Bonaparte, French Prince, Napoleon's brother (House of Bonaparte) |
| | | His Serene Highness Joseph Fesch, French Prince, Napoleon's maternal uncle (House of Fesch) |
| | | His Imperial Highness Lucien Bonaparte, French Prince, Napoleon's brother (House of Bonaparte) |

Imperial House Imperial House of France
| Vacant Title last held by House of Bourbon; Ruled as King of France | Ruling House of the French Empire; 1804–1814 | Succeeded by House of Bourbon; Ruled as King of France |
