= Quum memoranda =

Papal bull issued by Pope Pius VII

Quum memoranda Latin for 'On that memorable day' Papal brief of Pope Pius VII
- Signature date: 10 June 1809
- Subject: Excommunication of Emperor Napoleon
- Number: 2 of 5 of the pontificate

Quum memoranda (Latin, "on [that] memorable [day]...") is a papal brief issued by Pope Pius VII in 1809. It was a response to a decree issued by Emperor Napoleon on 17 May 1809, which incorporated the remnants of the Papal States into the French Empire, during the Napoleonic Wars. The brief was published on 10 June, the day of the decree's proclamation in Rome, capital of the Papal States, with an excommunication of Napoleon (though not by name) and all those who had contributed to what the Holy See saw as a violation of its temporal power.

French troops had already occupied Rome in February 1808, followed by Marche, and in April of that year a decree by Napoleon announced the annexation of the Church States, although without affecting the pope's power in the capital. In May 1809, however, two more decrees were published, with the first declaring that the "temporal pretensions of the Pope were irreconcilable with the safety, tranquility, and prosperity of the Empire". This was proclaimed by the French authorities in Rome, on 10 June 1809, thus ending the secular power of the already weakened Holy See. Pius, after some hesitancy, released the excommunication bull later the same day, thanks to the insistence of his advisor Cardinal Pacca. By the following morning, issues were already posted on the walls of the three major churches of Rome, Saint Mary Major, Saint John Lateran and Saint Peter.

== Aftermath ==
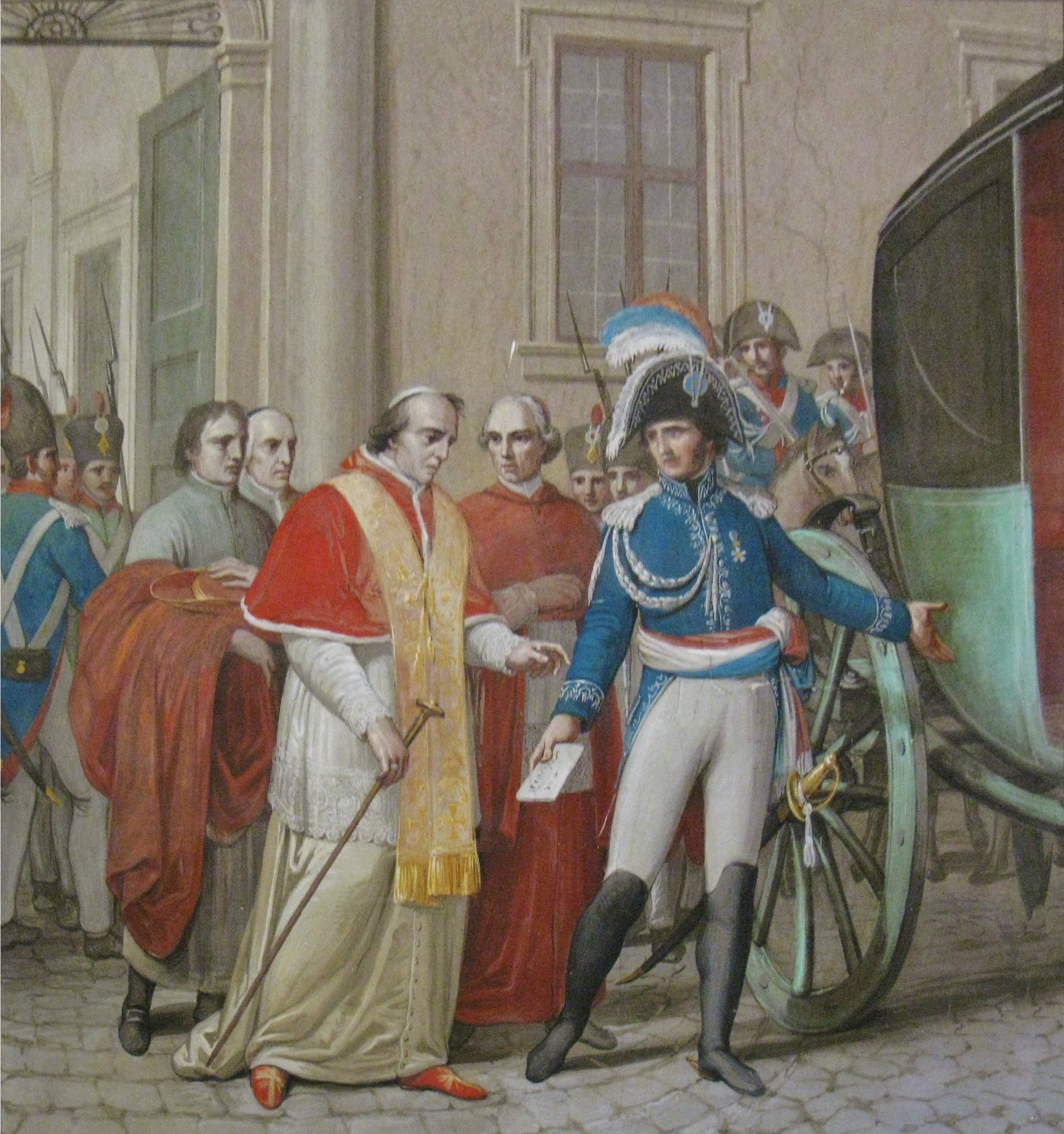
Pius VII being arrested by Étienne Radet on 6 July 1809

The relationship between France and the Holy See only deteriorated further. Soon French military authorities decided for to arrest Pius VII, with the intention of better securing control of Rome. After some initial hesitation, General Sextius Alexandre François de Miollis, commander of the French garrison in the city, allowed the operation to proceed, as Brigadier-general Étienne Radet argued that Rome could no longer be governed unless a show of force was made. In the early hours of 6 July, less than a month after the issuing of the Quum memoranda, French troops led by Radet entered the Quirinal Palace and arrested Pius, who was then taken to a carriage and departed the city. After short stays in Genoa and Grenoble, a large house in Savona was chosen as a suitable place for Pius to settle in his exile, while still being allowed to conduct ceremonies and receive visits from the local population.

=== Napoleon's reconciliation ===
As he later reconciled with the Catholic Church, Napoleon's excommunication was lifted. During the exile in Saint Helena, he spoke to General Montholon of Pope Pius VII as "an old man full of tolerance and light", adding that "fatal circumstances embroiled our cabinets. I regret it exceedingly". After the former emperor asked for a chaplain, saying "it would rest my soul to hear Mass", Pius successfully petitioned Britain to accept his request and sent the Abbé Vignali to Saint Helena. Napoleon died on 5 May 1821, in Longwood House, having received in his final days the Eucharist and the last rites.

== See also ==
- Napoleon and the Catholic Church
- List of people excommunicated by the Catholic Church
