= Napoleon and the Catholic Church =

Relations between Napoleon and the Catholic Church

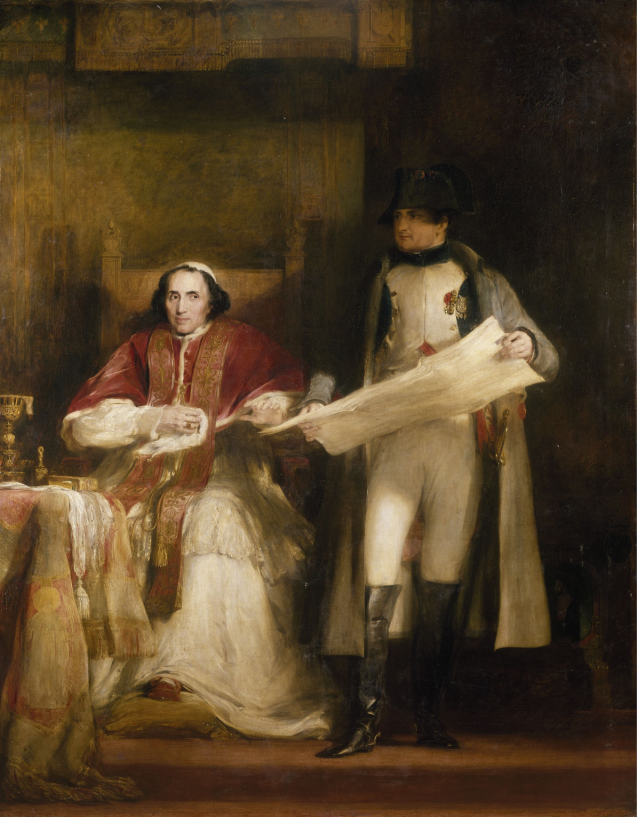
Napoleon and Pius VII at Fontainebleau by David Wilkie, 1836

Napoleon and the Catholic Church remained on difficult terms throughout the former's rule. Although Napoleon moderated the radical secularism of the French Revolution, he opposed the church as a political power at various turns and had two successive popes held prisoner, resulting in his excommunication by Pope Pius VII.

== Attack on Pius VI ==
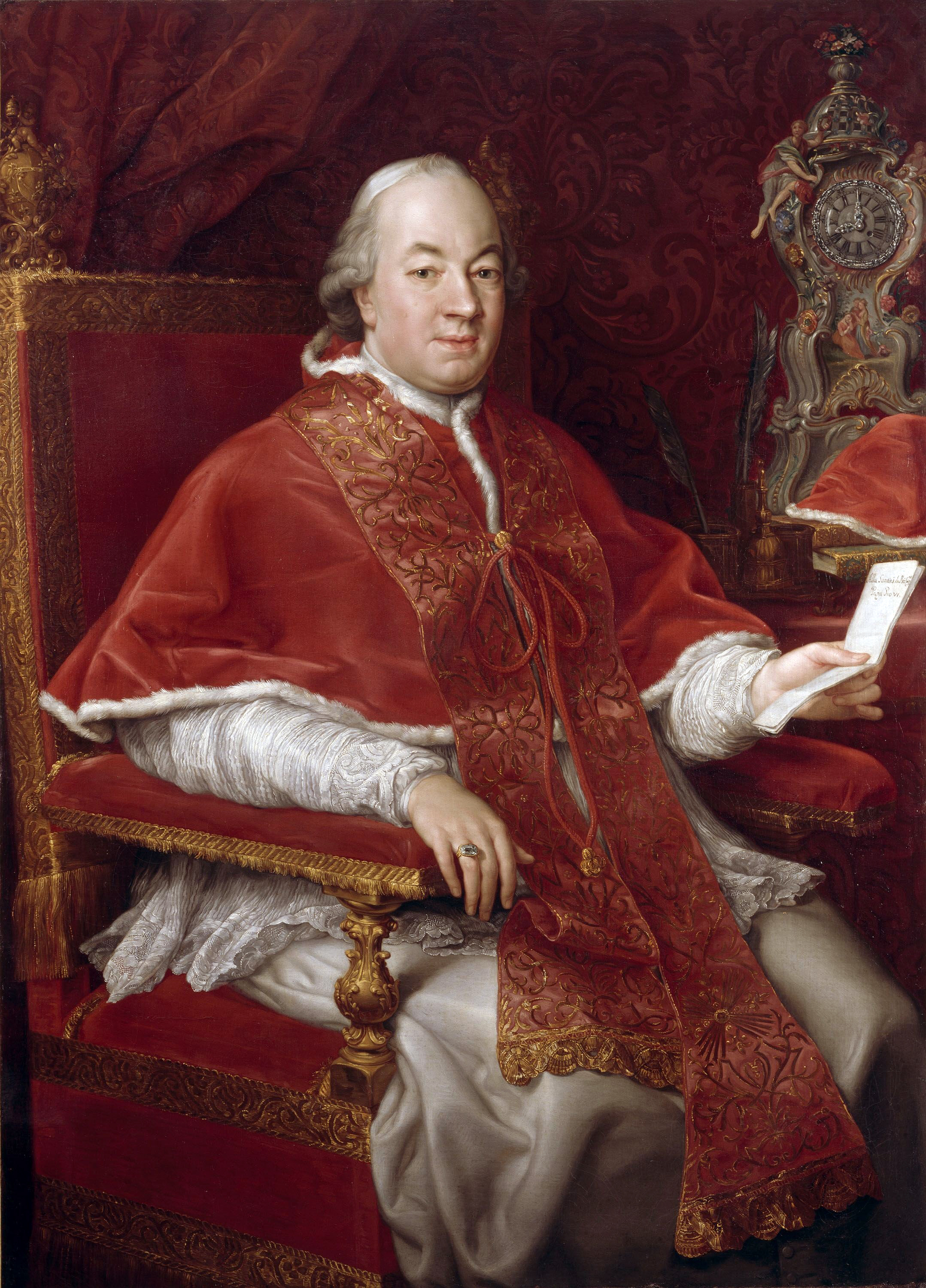
Pope Pius VI by Pompeo Batoni, 1775

In 1796, French troops under the command of General Napoleon Bonaparte invaded Italy, defeated the Papal Army, and occupied Ancona and Loreto.

Pope Pius VI sued for peace, which was granted at the Treaty of Tolentino on 19 February 1797, but on 28 December that year, in a riot papal forces blamed on Italian and French revolutionaries, the popular Brigadier-General Mathurin-Léonard Duphot, who had gone to Rome with Joseph Bonaparte as part of the French embassy, was killed and a new pretext was furnished for invasion. General Louis-Alexandre Berthier marched to Rome, entered it unopposed on 10 February 1798 and, proclaiming a Roman Republic, demanded the pope renounce his temporal power.

Upon his refusal, Pius VI was taken prisoner, and on 20 February he was escorted from the Vatican to Siena, and then to the Certosa near Florence. The French declaration of war against Tuscany led to his removal, escorted by the Spaniard Pedro Gómez Labrador, Marquis of Labrador, by way of Parma, Piacenza, Turin, and Grenoble to the citadel of Valence, the chief town of Drôme. He died there six weeks after his arrival, on 29 August 1799, having reigned longer than any pope.

Pius VI's body was embalmed, but was not buried until 30 January 1800 after Napoleon saw political advantage to burying his remains in an effort to bring the Catholic Church back into France.

It was not until the conclave of cardinals had gathered to elect a new pope that Napoleon decided to bury Pius VI who had died several weeks earlier. He gave him a gaudy ceremony in an effort to gain the attention of the Catholic Church. This eventually led to the Concordat of 1801 negotiated by Ercole Consalvi, the pope's secretary of state, which restored limited papal authority over the church in France. However, the Concordat also contained the "Organic Articles" which Consalvi had fiercely opposed but which Napoleon had nevertheless instituted.

== Peace of Lunéville ==
The papacy had suffered a major loss of church lands through secularisations in the Holy Roman Empire following the Treaty of Lunéville in 1801, when a number of German princes were compensated for their losses by the seizure of ecclesiastical property.

== Concordat of 1801 ==
The Concordat of 1801 was an agreement between Napoleon Bonaparte and Pope Pius VII that reaffirmed the Roman Catholic Church as the majority church of France and restored some of its civil status.

While the Concordat restored some ties to the papacy, it largely favoured the interests of the French state; the balance of church-state relations had tilted firmly in Bonaparte's favour. As a part of the Concordat, he presented another set of laws called the Organic Articles.

== Relations with Pius VII ==
From the beginning of his papacy to the fall of Napoleon in 1815, Pius VII was completely involved with France. He and Napoleon were continually in conflict, often involving the French leader's wishes for concessions to his demands.

== Imperial coronation ==
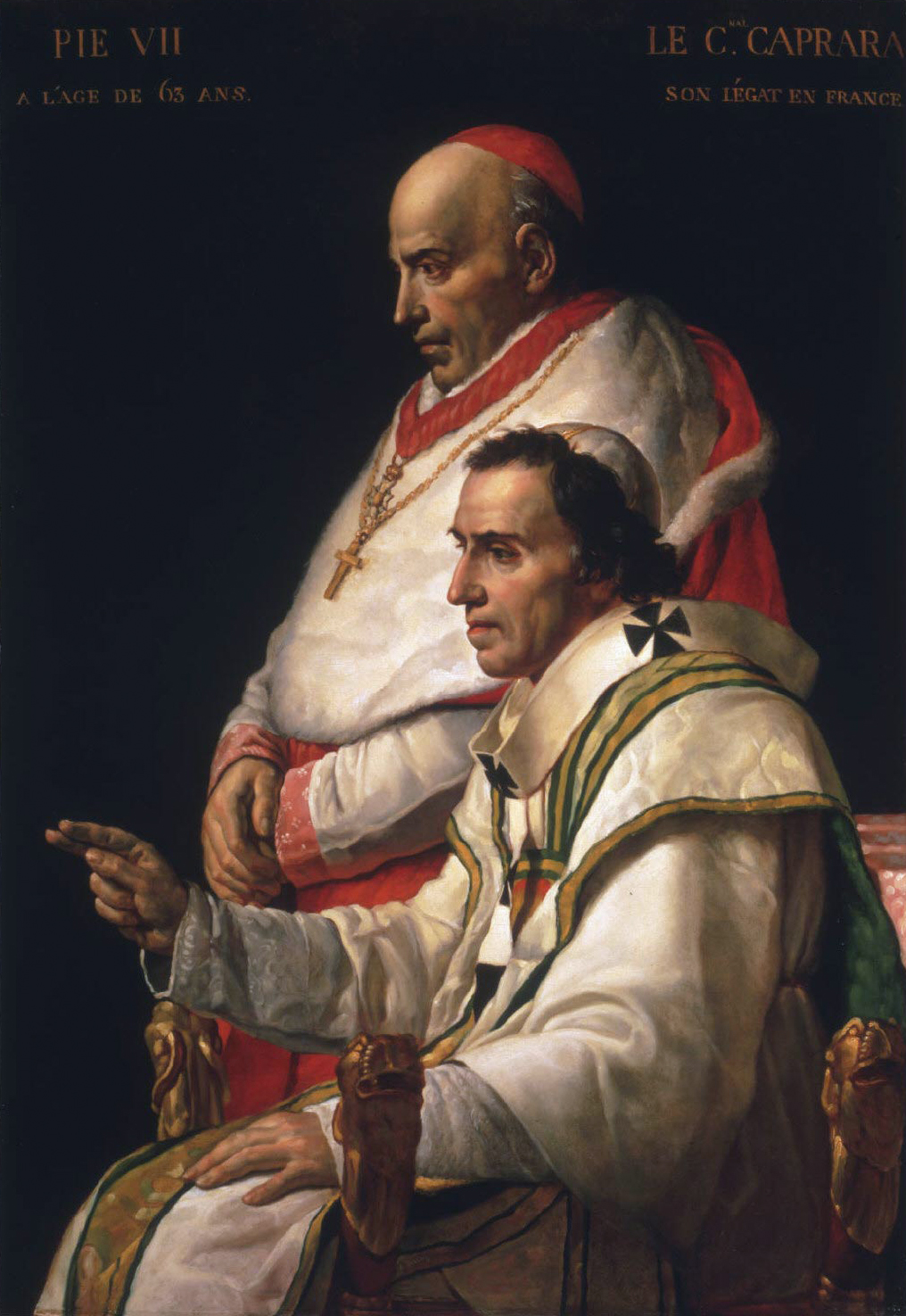
Pope Pius VII with Cardinal Caprara, papal legate to France. Study for The Coronation of Napoleon by Jacques-Louis David.

Despite the opposition of most of the Roman Curia, Pius VII traveled to Paris for Napoleon's coronation in 1804. Napoleon placed the crown on his head himself. The painting by Jacques-Louise David titled The Coronation of Napoleon depicts the seated pope at the ceremony as Napoleon crowns his wife.

Although the pope and the papacy were promised rich gifts and donations, Pius initially refused most of these offers. Napoleon did give him the Napoleon Tiara, decorated with large emeralds from the looted tiara of Pope Pius VI, but it was deliberately made too small and heavy to be worn and meant as an insult to the pope. Napoleon also commissioned a Portrait of Pope Pius VII by David.

== Influence of Cardinal Joseph Fesch ==
Appointed by Napoleon on 4 April 1803 to succeed François Cacault on the latter's retirement from the position of French ambassador to Rome, Cardinal Joseph Fesch was assisted by François-René de Chateaubriand, but soon sharply differed with him on many questions. Towards the close of 1804, Napoleon entrusted to Fesch the difficult task of securing the presence of Pope Pius VII at the forthcoming coronation of the emperor at Notre-Dame in Paris. The Cardinal's tact in overcoming the reluctance of the pope (only eight months after the execution of the Duke of Enghien) received further recognition. He received the grand cordon of the Légion d'honneur, became grand-almoner of the empire, and had a seat in the French Senate. He was to receive further honours. In 1806, one of the most influential of the German clerics, Karl von Dalberg, then prince-bishop of Regensburg, chose him to be his coadjutor and designated him as his successor.

Subsequent events damaged his prospects. From 1806 to 1807, Napoleon clashed sharply with the pope on matters both political and religious, as Fesch sought in vain to reconcile them. Napoleon was inexorable in his demands, and Pius VII refused to compromise the discipline and vital interests of the church. The emperor several times rebuked Fesch as weak and ingrateful. It is clear, however, that the Cardinal went as far as possible in counselling the submission of the spiritual to the civil power. For a time he was not on speaking terms with the pope, and Napoleon recalled him from Rome.

== Role of the Archbishop of Paris ==
Napoleon appointed Jean-Baptiste de Belloy as bishop to the See of Paris. Notwithstanding his extreme age, he governed his new diocese with astonishing vigour and intelligence, reorganised the parishes, provided them with good pastors, and visited his flock in person. He restored the Crown of Thorns (10 August 1806) to its place of honour in the Sainte-Chapelle. Napoleon was so satisfied that he secured for him the cardinal's hat, which Pius VII placed on the prelate's head in Paris on 1 February 1805.

== French annexation of the Papal States ==
Relations between the Church and Napoleon deteriorated. On 3 February 1808, General Sextius Alexandre François de Miollis occupied Rome with a division. The following month, the Kingdom of Italy annexed the papal provinces of Ancona, Macerata, Fermo, and Urbino, and diplomatic relations were broken off.

On 17 May 1809, Napoleon issued two decrees from Schönbrunn Palace near Vienna in which he reproached the popes for the ill use they had made of the donation of Charlemagne, his "august predecessor”, and declared those territories which were still under the direct control of the Papal States were to be annexed by the French Empire. The territories were to be organised under Miollis with a council extraordinary to administer them. As compensation the pope would receive a stipend of 2,000,000 francs per annum. On 10 June, Miollis had the Pontifical flag, which still floated over the Castle of Saint Angelo, lowered.

== Excommunication ==
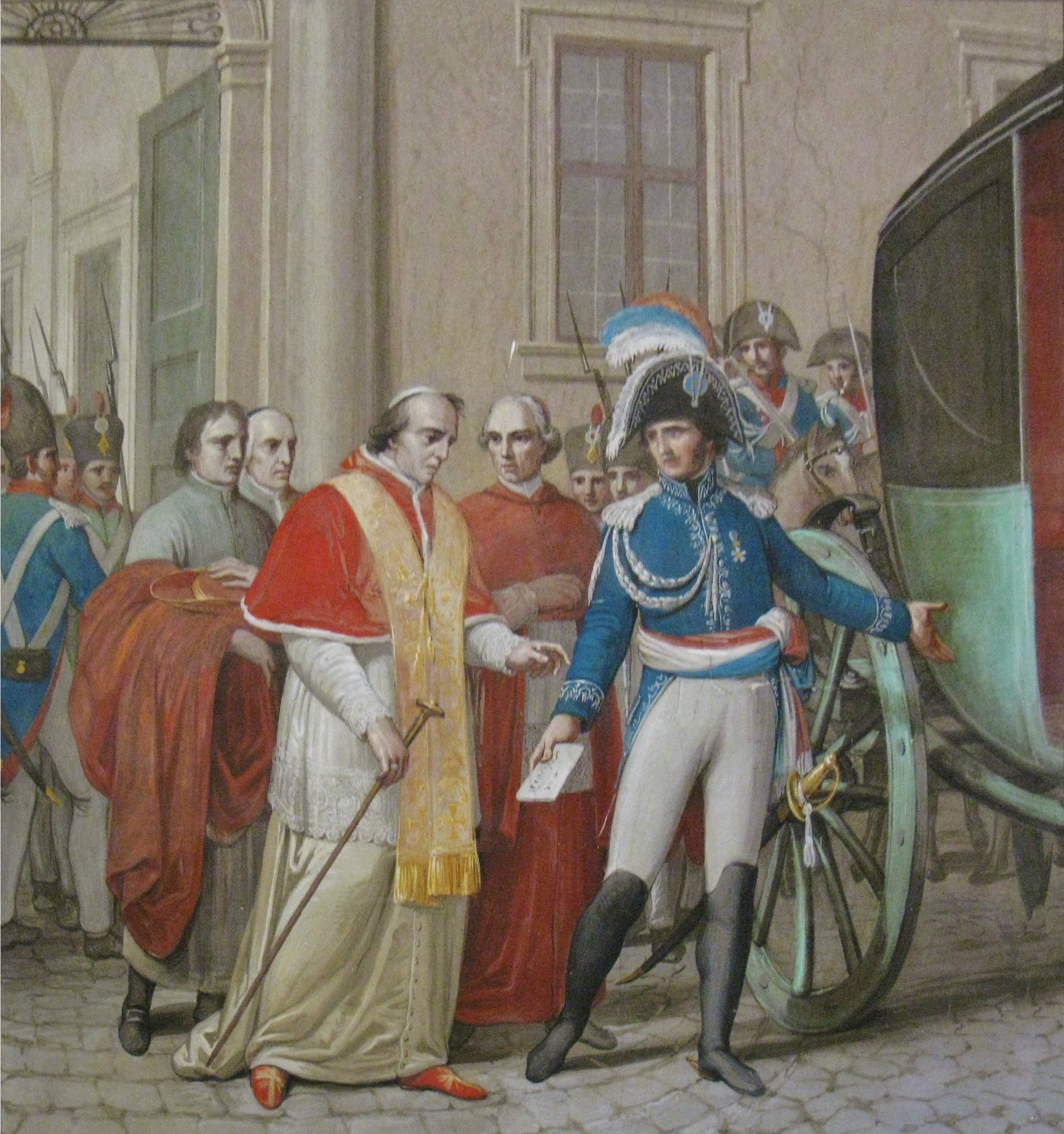
Pius VII being arrested by Étienne Radet on 6 July 1809

When Pius VII subsequently excommunicated Napoleon, French Brigade-general Étienne Radet saw an opportunity to gain Napoleon's favour and arrested the pope on the night of 5 July 1809. Although Napoleon had ordered the Castel Sant'Angelo to be occupied by French troops and cannons to be pointed at the papal bedroom, he did not approve of Radet's actions. Despite this, Pius VII remained a French prisoner, being sent first to Genoa and then Grenoble before being placed under house arrest at a large mansion in Savona. Napoleon sent several delegations to pressure Pius VII to yield power and sign a new concordat with France, including invoking a church council.

== Papal rescue ==
The pope remained in confinement for over six years, and did not return to Rome until 24 May 1814, when the 5th Radetzky Hussars of the Coalition forces freed him during a pursuit of French forces. Hungarian hussars escorted the pope back to Rome through the Alps.

Captain János Nepomuki Horváth gave his own coat to warm the pope, the same officer depicted as the protagonist of Sándor Petőfi's epic János vitéz. For his gallantry, Horváth received the highest papal decoration, the Supreme Order of Christ. The pope also gave the hussars a flag, now in the Vienna Arsenal, reading "Ungariae Patronae Pium comitatis ad Urbem; O felix tanto Roma sub auspicio - Boldog vagy Róma, hogy érzed a Magyarok Nagyasszonyának oltalmát, ki Piust a Városba kísérte" (You are happy Rome to feel the protection of Our Lady of Hungary, who accompanied Pius to the City).

== Congress of Vienna ==
At the Congress of Vienna, the Papal States were largely restored along with the Jesuits. The pope offered a refuge in his capital to the members of the Bonaparte family. Princess Letizia, the deposed emperor's mother, lived there; likewise did his brothers Lucien and Louis, and his uncle Fesch.

== Reconciliation with the Church ==
During Napoleon's exile on Saint Helena, the pope wrote to the British government asking for better treatment of the former emperor, saying: "He can no longer be a danger to anybody. We would not wish him to become a cause for remorse."

Napoleon reconciled with the Catholic Church and asked for a chaplain, saying "it would rest my soul to hear Mass". The pope petitioned the British to allow this, and sent the Abbé Ange Vignali to Saint Helena. On 20 April 1821, Napoleon told General Charles Tristan, "I was born in the Catholic religion. I wish to fulfill the duties it imposes, and receive the succour it administers." To Tristan, he affirmed his belief in God and read aloud the Old Testament, the Gospels, and the Acts of the Apostles. He died on 5 May 1821, after receiving the sacraments of Confession, Extreme Unction, and Viaticum in the presence of Vignali.
