= Portrait of Pope Pius VII (Camuccini) =

Painting by Vincenzo Camuccini

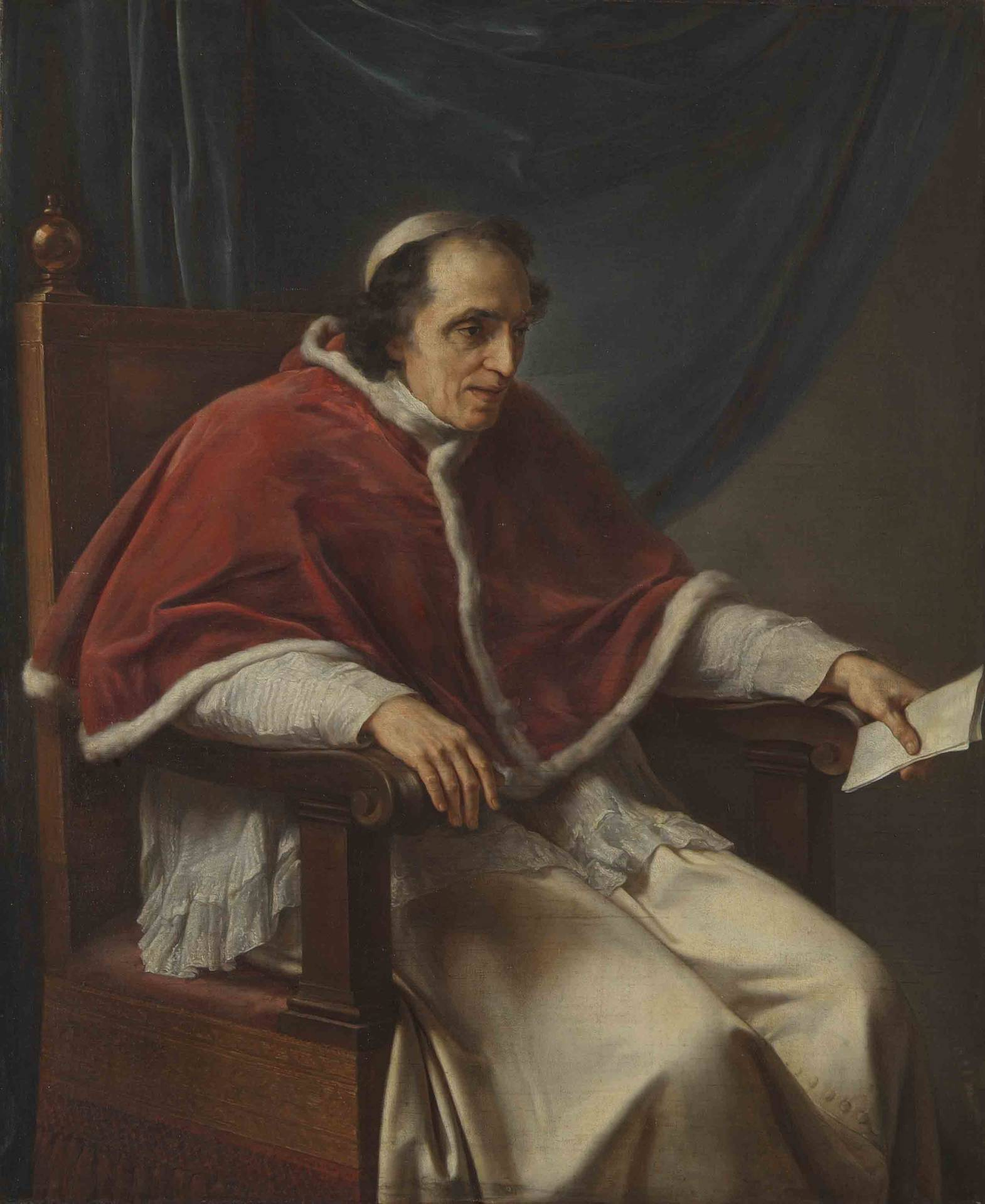
- Artist: Vincenzo Camuccini
- Year: 1814-15
- Type: Oil on canvas, portrait painting
- Dimensions: 137 cm × 112.5 cm (54 in × 44.3 in)
- Location: Kunsthistorisches Museum, Vienna

Portrait of Pope Pius VII is an 1815 portrait painting by the Italian artist Vincenzo Camuccini. It depicts Pope Pius VII who reigned between 1800 and 1823. Pius had recently returned to Rome, having been imprisoned in France for several years by Napoleon after refusing to grant the French emperor a divorce from his first wife Josephine.

The Neoclassically-trained Camuccini was one of the city's leading painters. However, the painting has been compared negatively by Thomas E. Crow to the British artist Thomas Lawrence's more magisterial Portrait of Pope Pius VII produced in 1819 as part of the commission for the Waterloo Chamber at Windsor Castle, although Lawrence was himself more complementary about Camuccini's painting at the time.

Today the work is in the Kunsthistorisches Museum in Vienna. Another version produced by Camuccini is now at Friedenstein Palace

== Bibliography ==
- Crow, Thomas. Restoration: The Fall of Napoleon in the Course of European Art, 1812-1820. Princeton University Press, 2023.
- Olson, Roberta. Ottocento: Romanticism and Revolution in 19th-century Italian Painting. American Federation of Arts, 1992.
- Petrucci, Francesco. Papi in Posa; 500 Years of Papal Portraiture. Gangemi, 2005.
