= Étienne Radet =

French Army officer (1762–1825)

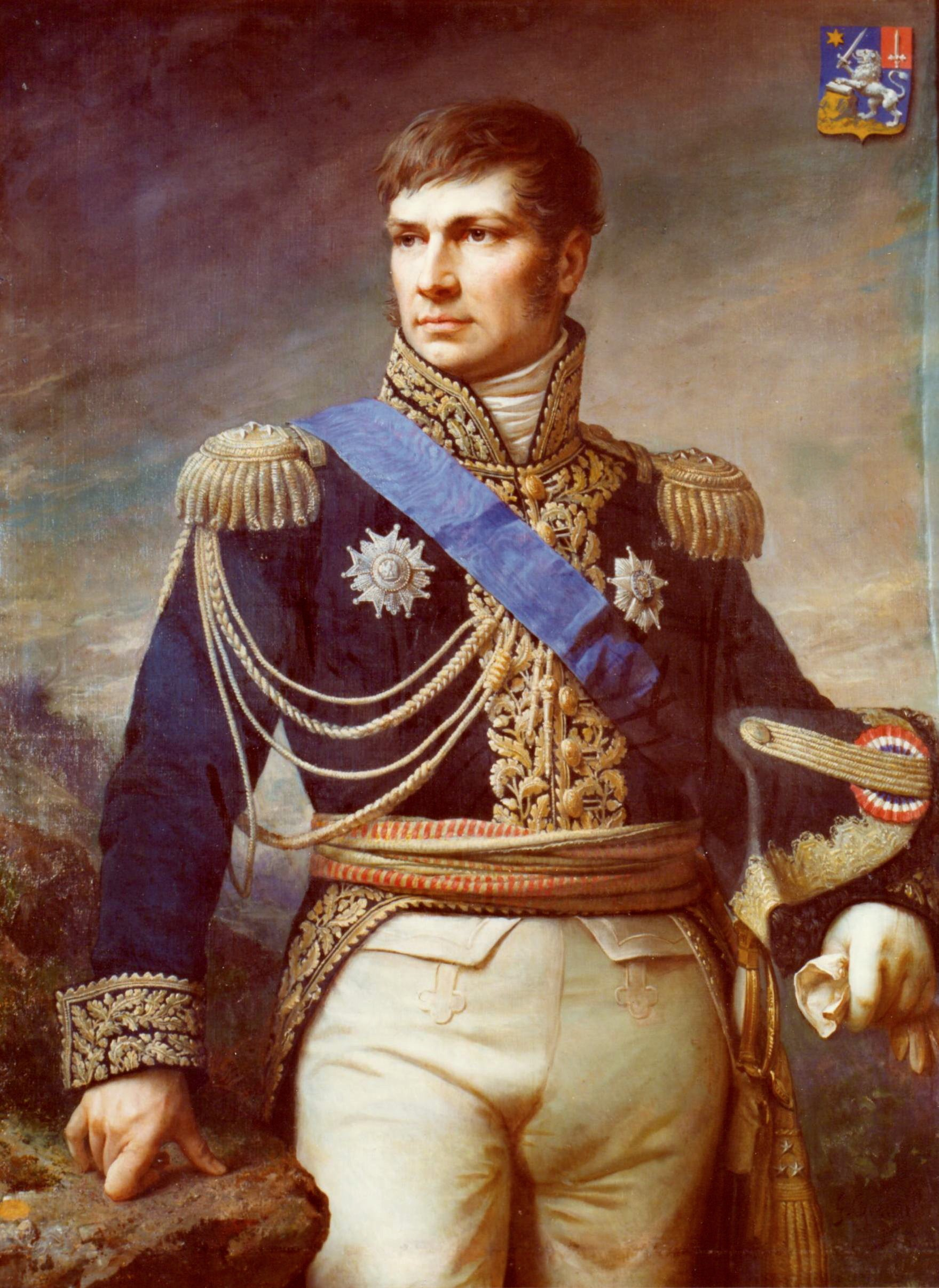
Portrait of Radet

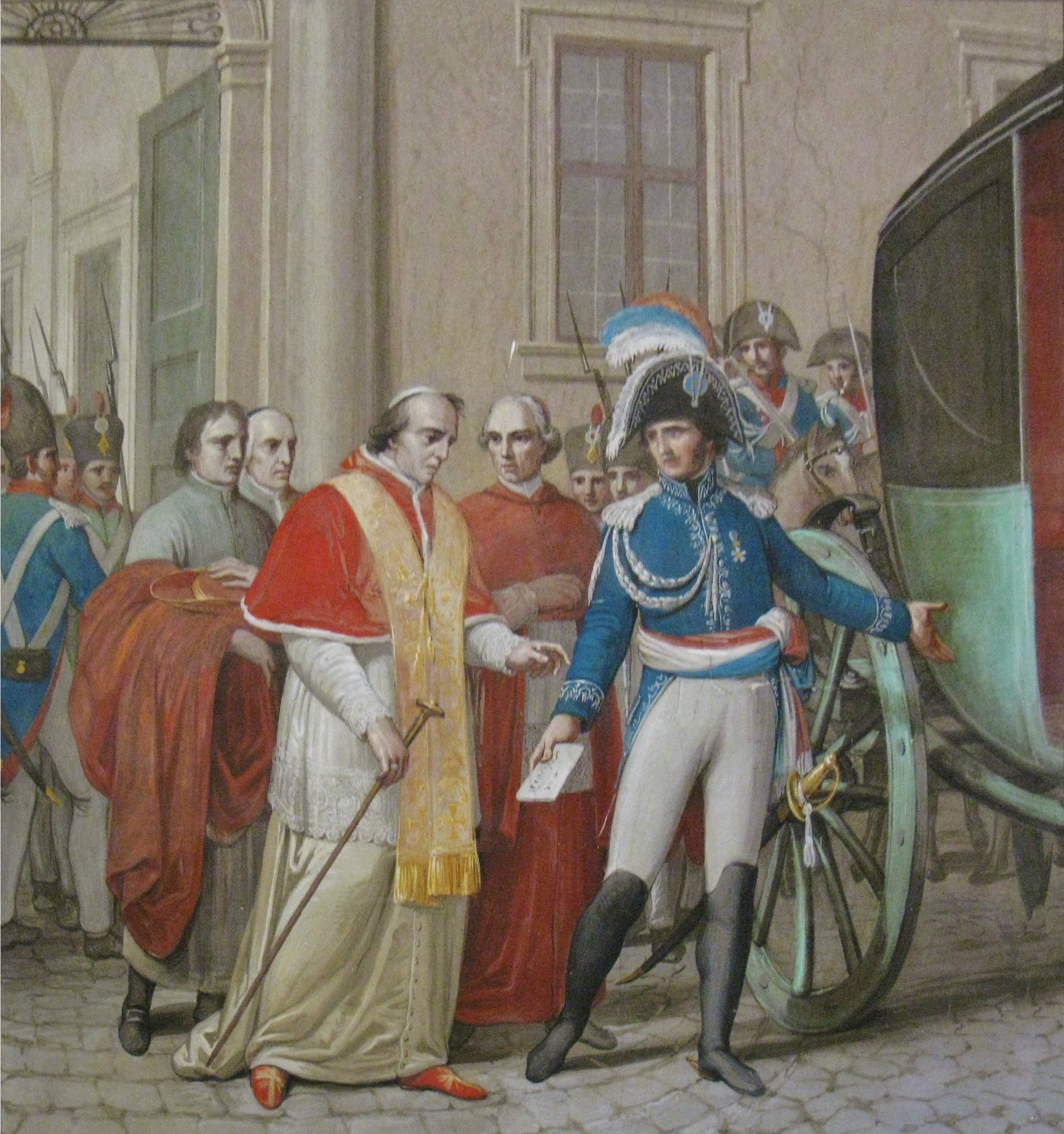
Pius VII being arrested by Radet on 6 July 1809

Étienne, baron Radet (French pronunciation: [etjɛn ʁadɛ]; 1762 – 27 September 1825) was a French Army officer who served in the French Revolutionary and Napoleonic Wars. He is best known for arresting Pius VII on 6 July 1809.

== Biography ==
Radet was born at Stenay, in 1762.

He joined the Régiment de La Sarre as a soldier on 4 April 1780. He was promoted to corporal on 20 March 1781, and sergeant on 26 April 1782. Dismissed on 12 October 1786, he became a constabulary's rider on 30 November.

Radet was appointed as a general of brigade in 1800 by Napoleon Bonaparte, who gave him the chief command of all the National Gendarmerie (armed police). In 1809, he was ordered to Rome. In July of that year he arrested Pope Pius VII at the Quirinal Palace and conducted him to Florence.

Radet received the title of baron in 1809. He became a general of division in 1813.

In June 1815, after the return of Napoleon to France, Radet was appointed Grand Provost of the National Gendarmerie, accompanying the French army in Belgium during the Waterloo Campaign. He was present at the Battle of Ligny and at the Battle of Waterloo, where in the evening of 18 June he was wounded. During the retreat he rode, while bleeding, in the company of Napoleon as far as Charleroi, before proceeding to Beaumont, where he attempted to rally those fleeing and stem the rout. At Maubeuge and Avesnes on 19 June he issued orders to the National Gendarmerie to start arresting the fugitives in an attempt to reconstitute the army and restore discipline. At Laon on 20 June he again met Napoleon, who proceeded to Paris, where Radet soon followed, having been granted leave to rest and heal his wounds. While Radet was in Paris, Napoleon abdicated for the second time.

After the Bourbon Restoration in France, Radet was imprisoned in the Citadel of Besançon on 28 June 1816. King Louis XVIII remitted the rest of his sentence on 24 December 1818. Allowed to retire on 1 December 1819, he died on 27 September 1825, in Varennes-en-Argonne.

== In fiction ==
In 1981, he was depicted by French actor Jacques Herlin in the Italian movie Il Marchese del Grillo.

== Sources ==
- Radet, E., Mémoires du général Radet (ed. A. Combier), St. Cloud: 1892.
- Mullié, Charles (1852), "RADET (Étienne, baron)" , Biographie des célébrités militaires des armées de terre et de mer de 1789 à 1850 (in French), Paris: Poignavant et Compagnie
- Thomas, Joseph (1892), Universal pronouncing dictionary of biography and mythology (Iacchus – Zype), vol. 2, Philadelphia: J.B. Lippincott, p. 1860
