= Pope Pius VII =

Head of the Catholic Church from 1800 to 1823

Servant of God Pius VII
- Bishop of Rome
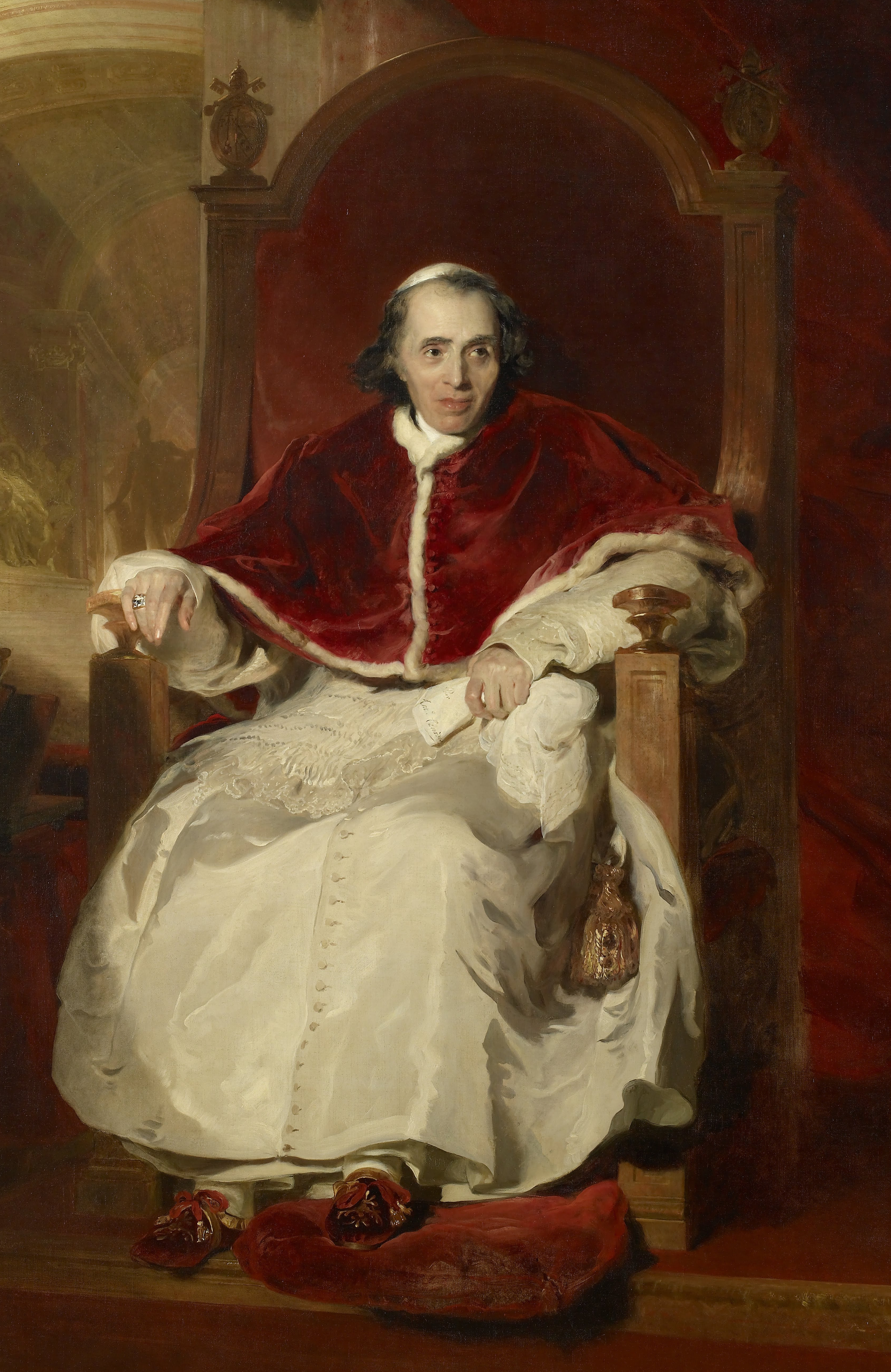
- Portrait of Pope Pius VII by Thomas Lawrence, 1819
- Church: Catholic Church
- Papacy began: 14 March 1800
- Papacy ended: 20 August 1823
- Predecessor: Pius VI
- Successor: Leo XII
- Previous posts: Abbot of San Paolo fuori le Mura (1775‍–‍1782); Bishop of Tivoli (1782‍–‍1785); Bishop of Imola (1785‍–‍1800); Cardinal Priest of San Callisto (1785‍–‍1800)

Orders
- Ordination: 21 September 1765
- Consecration: 21 December 1782 by Francesco Saverio de Zelada
- Created cardinal: 14 February 1785 by Pius VI

Personal details
- Born: Barnaba Niccolò Maria Luigi Chiaramonti; 14 August 1742 Cesena, Papal States
- Died: 20 August 1823 (aged 81) Rome, Papal States
- Signature: Pius VII's signature

- Coat of arms: Pius VII's coat of arms

Pope Pius VII (Italian: Pio VII; born Barnaba Niccolò Maria Luigi Chiaramonti; (Note: English: Barnabas Nicholas Maria Louis Chiaramonti) 14 August 1742 – 20 August 1823) was head of the Catholic Church from 14 March 1800 to his death in August 1823. He was the leader of the Papal States from June 1800 to 17 May 1809 and again from 1814 to his death. Chiaramonti was also a monk of the Order of Saint Benedict in addition to being a well-known theologian and bishop.

Chiaramonti was made Bishop of Tivoli in 1782, and resigned that position upon his appointment as Bishop of Imola in 1785. That same year, he was made a cardinal. In 1789, the French Revolution took place, and as a result a series of anti-clerical governments came into power in the country. In 1798, during the French Revolutionary Wars, French troops under Louis-Alexandre Berthier invaded Rome and captured Pope Pius VI, taking him as a prisoner to France, where he died in 1799. The following year, after a sede vacante period lasting approximately six months, Chiaramonti was elected to the papacy, taking the name Pius VII.

Pius at first attempted to take a cautious approach in dealing with Napoleon. With him he signed the Concordat of 1801, through which he succeeded in guaranteeing religious freedom for Catholics living in France, and was present at his coronation as Emperor of the French in 1804. In 1809, however, during the Napoleonic Wars, Napoleon once again invaded the Papal States, resulting in his excommunication through the papal bull Quum memoranda. Pius VII was taken prisoner and transported to France. He remained there until 1814 when, after the French were defeated, he was permitted to return to Italy, where he was greeted warmly as a hero and defender of the faith.

Pius lived the remainder of his life in relative peace. His papacy saw a significant growth of the Catholic Church in the United States, where Pius established several new dioceses. Pius VII died in 1823 at age 81.

In 2007, Pope Benedict XVI began the beatification process, and Pius VII was granted the title Servant of God.

== Biography ==
=== Early life ===
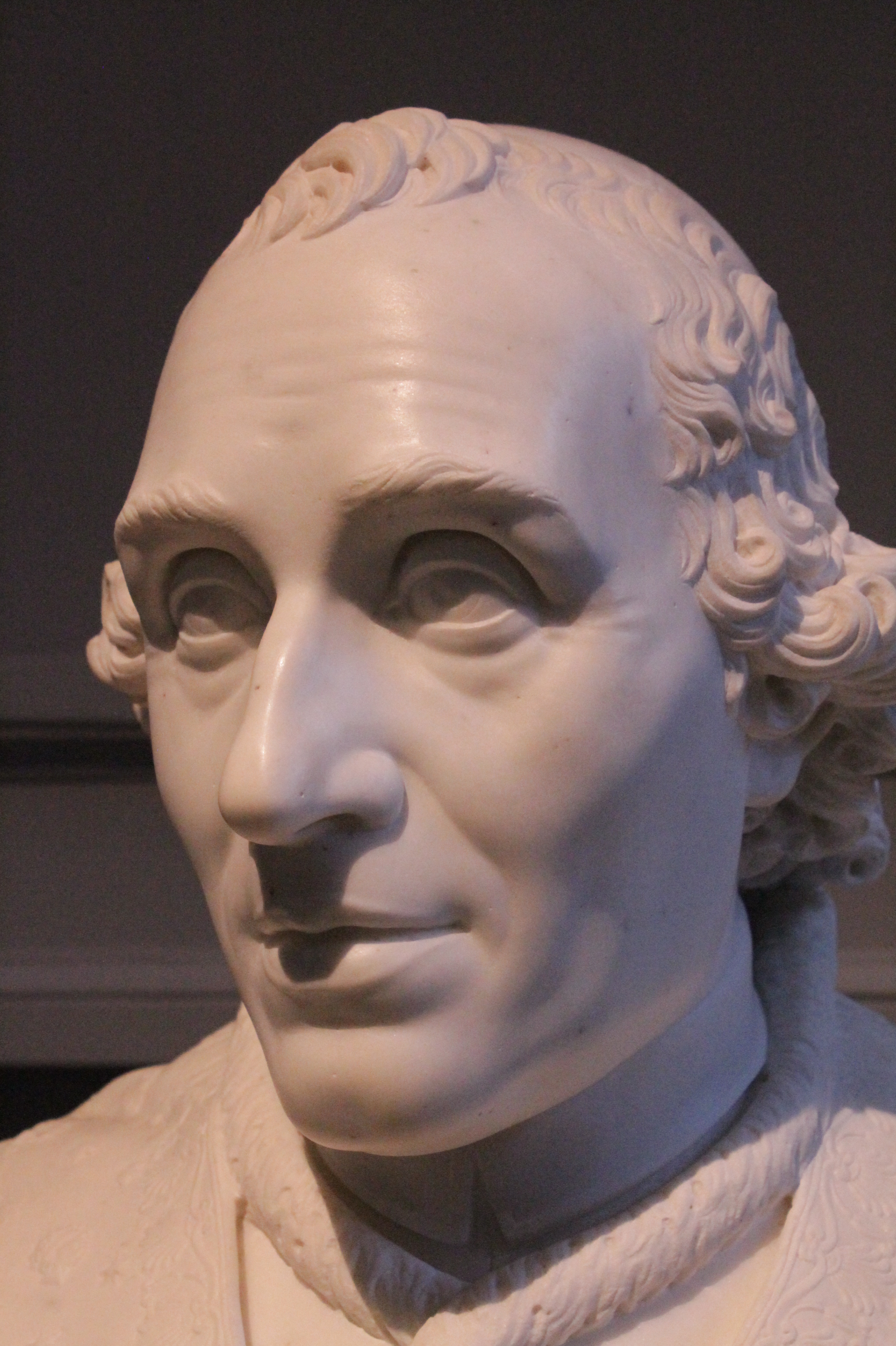
Pope Pius VII by Antonio Canova 1805, Albertinum, Dresden

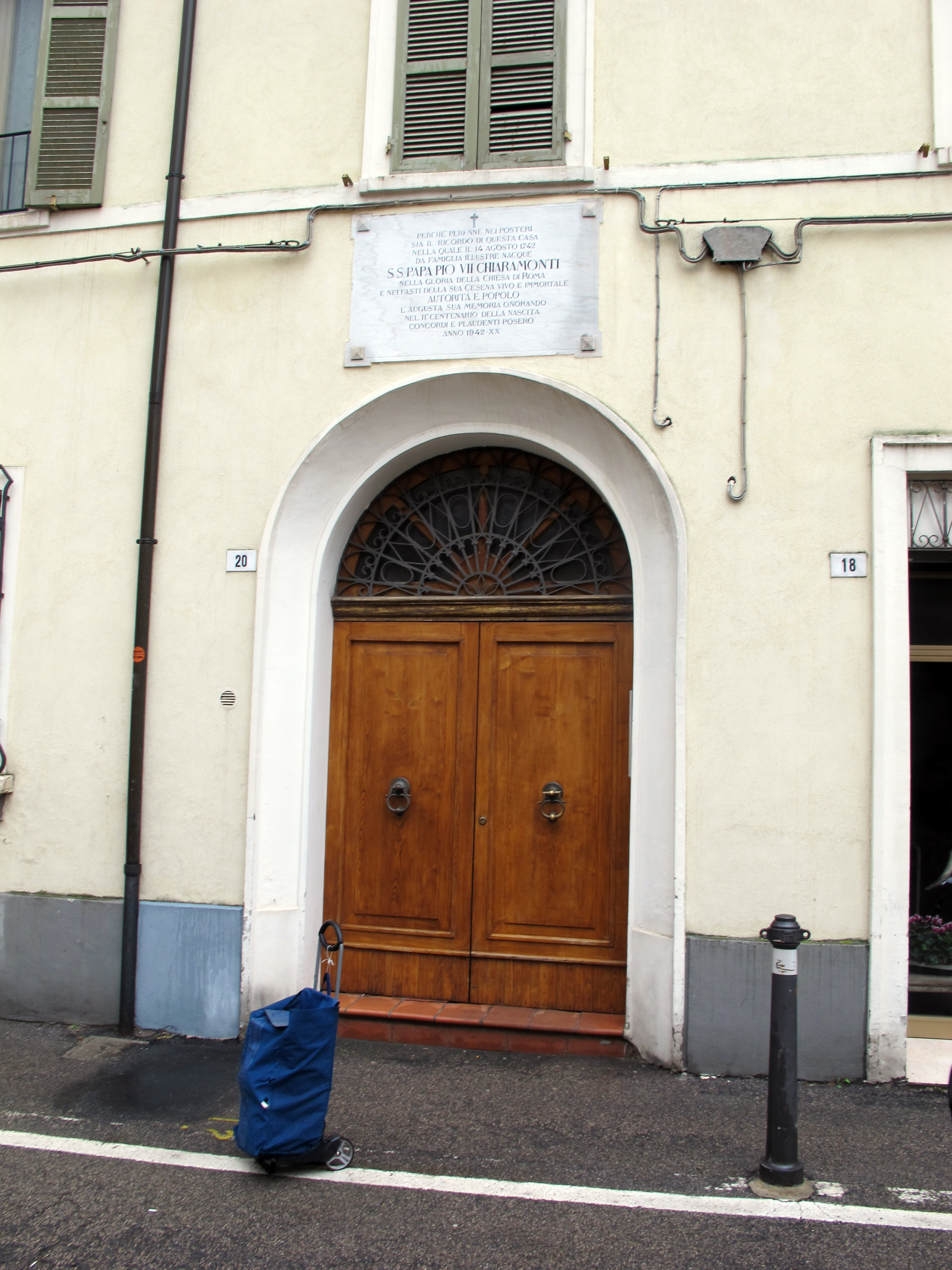
The birthplace of Pius VII

Barnaba Niccolò Maria Luigi Chiaramonti was born in Cesena in 1742, the youngest son of Count Scipione Chiaramonti (30 April 1698 – 13 September 1750). His mother, Giovanna Coronata (? - 22 November 1777), was the daughter of the Marquess Ghini. Though his family was of noble status, they were not wealthy but rather, were of middle-class stock.

Barnaba attended the Collegio dei Nobili in Ravenna but decided to join the Order of Saint Benedict at the age of 14 on 2 October 1756 as a novice at the Abbey of Santa Maria del Monte in Cesena. Two years after this on 20 August 1758, he became a professed member and assumed the name of Gregorio. He taught at Benedictine colleges in Parma and Rome, and was ordained a priest on 21 September 1765.

=== Episcopate and cardinalate ===
A series of promotions resulted after his relative, Giovanni Angelo Braschi, was elected Pope Pius VI (1775–99). A few years before this election occurred, in 1773, Chiaramonti became the personal confessor to Braschi. In 1776, Pius VI appointed the 34-year-old Dom Gregory, who had been teaching at the Monastery of Sant'Anselmo in Rome, as honorary abbot in commendam of his monastery. Although this was an ancient practice, it drew complaints from the monks of the community, as monastic communities generally felt it was not in keeping with the Rule of St. Benedict. He served as librarian at the Basilica of Saint Paul Outside the Walls.

In December 1782, the pope appointed Dom Gregory as the Bishop of Tivoli, near Rome. Pius VI soon named him, in February 1785, the Cardinal-Priest of San Callisto, and as the Bishop of Imola, an office he held until 1816.

When the French Revolutionary Army invaded Italy in 1797, Cardinal Chiaramonti counseled temperance and submission to the newly created Cisalpine Republic. In a letter that he addressed to the people of his diocese, Chiaramonti asked them to comply "... in the current circumstances of change of government (...)" to the authority of the victorious general Commander-in-Chief of the French army. In his Christmas homily that year, he asserted that there was no opposition between a democratic form of government and being a good Catholic: "Christian virtue makes men good democrats.... Equality is not an idea of philosophers but of Christ...and do not believe that the Catholic religion is against democracy."

== Papacy ==
Papal styles of Pope Pius VII
- Reference style: His Holiness
- Spoken style: Your Holiness
- Religious style: Holy Father
- Posthumous style: Servant of God

=== Election ===
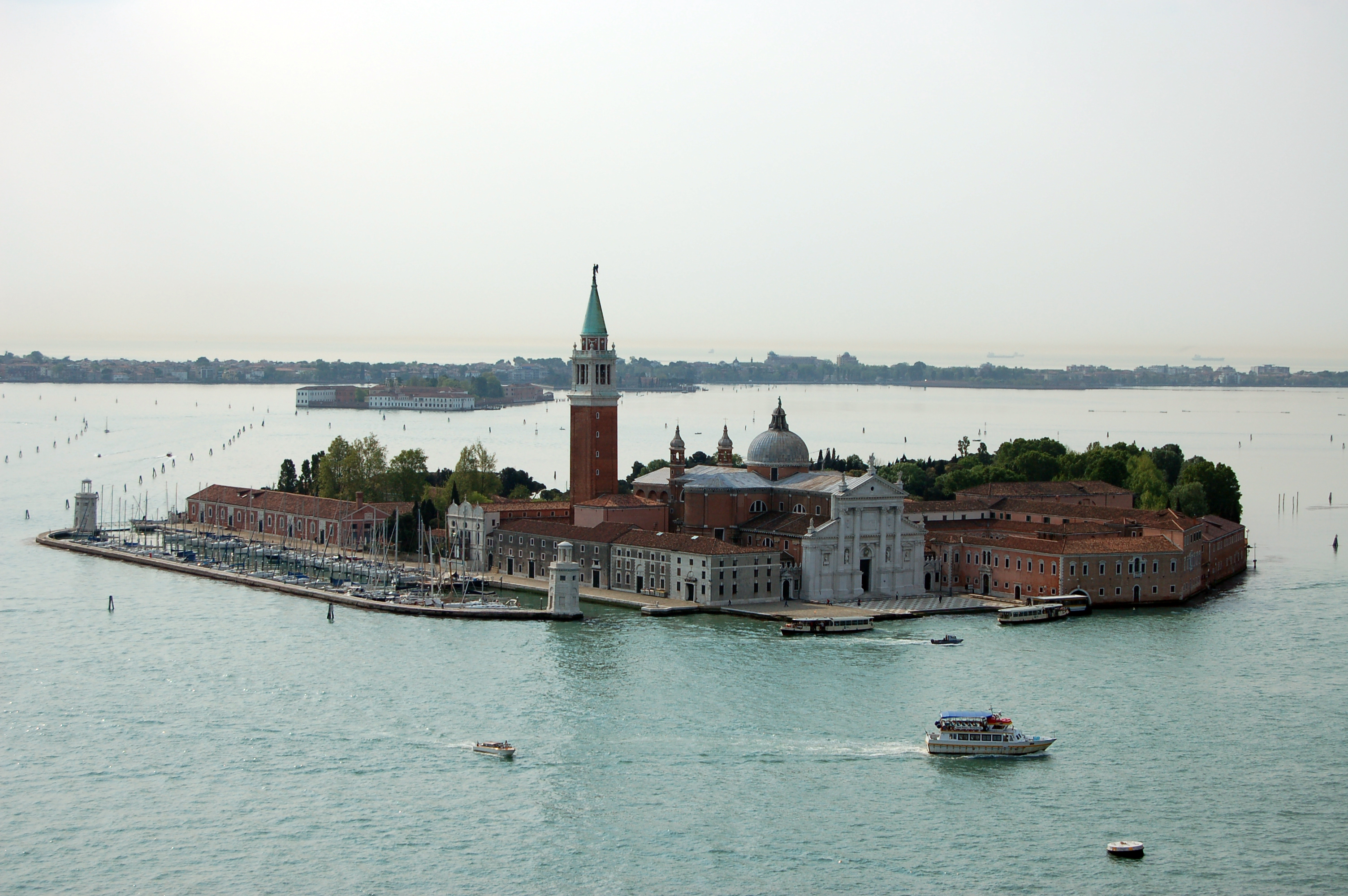
Site of the papal conclave that elected Pius VII

Following the death of Pope Pius VI, by then virtually France's prisoner, at Valence in 1799, the conclave to elect his successor met on 30 November 1799 in the Benedictine San Giorgio Monastery in Venice. There were three main candidates, two of whom proved to be unacceptable to the Habsburgs, whose candidate, Alessandro Mattei, could not secure sufficient votes. However, Carlo Bellisomi also was a candidate, though not favoured by Austrian cardinals; a "virtual veto" (Note: Rather than formal invocation of the claimed papal veto, this involved lobbying by the Austrian cardinals to deny him the necessary votes.) was imposed against him in the name of Francis II and carried out by Cardinal Franziskus Herzan von Harras.

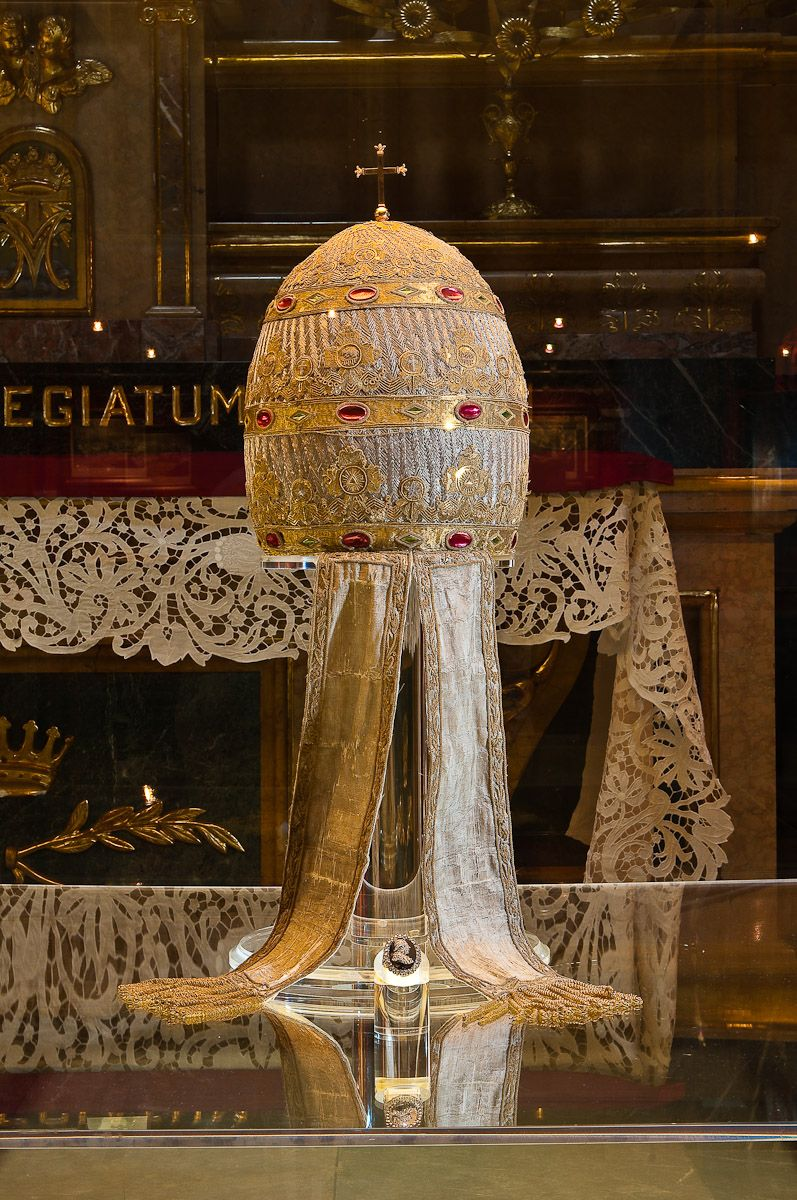
The tiara made for the coronation of Pope Pius VII in Venice, decorated with jewels donated by local families

After several months of stalemate, Ercole Consalvi proposed Chiaramonti as a compromise candidate. On 14 March 1800, Chiaramonti was elected pope, certainly not the choice of die-hard opponents of the French Revolution, and took as his pontifical name Pius VII in honour of his immediate predecessor. He was crowned on 21 March—in the adjacent monastery church as Emperor Francis II was not pleased by the choice of the cardinal electors and did not allow them to use San Marco Basilica for the ceremony—by means of a rather unusual ceremony, wearing a papier-mâché papal tiara—the French had seized the tiaras held by the Holy See when occupying Rome and forcing Pius VI into exile. The new pope then left for Rome, sailing on a barely seaworthy Austrian ship, the Bellona, which lacked even a galley. The twelve-day voyage ended at Pesaro and he proceeded to Rome.

=== Concordat of 1801 ===
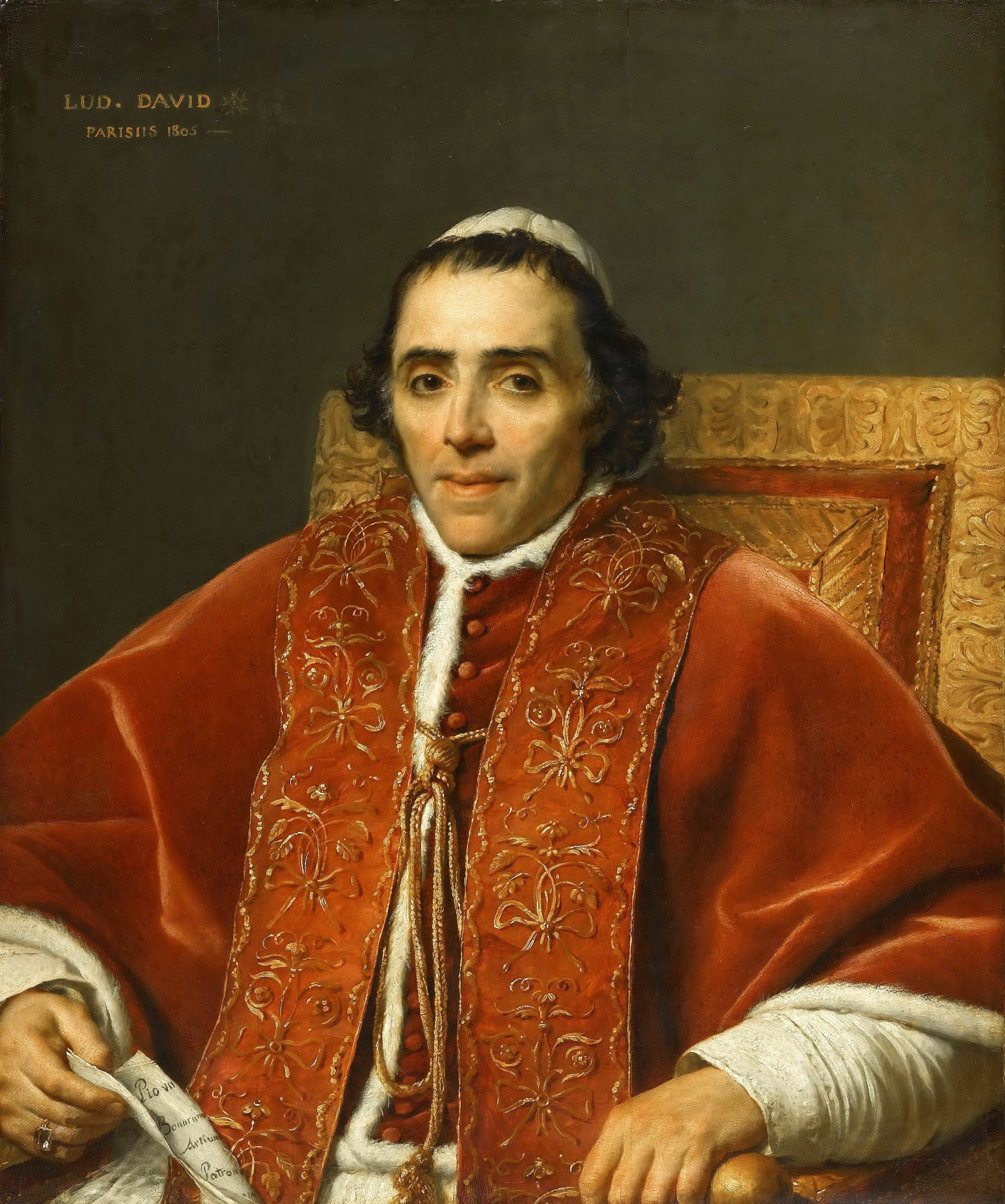
Portrait of Pope Pius VII, oil on wood by Jacques-Louis David (1805, Louvre, Paris)

One of Pius VII's first acts was appointing the minor cleric Ercole Consalvi, who had performed so ably as secretary to the recent conclave, to the College of Cardinals and to the office of Cardinal Secretary of State. Consalvi immediately left for France, where he was able to negotiate the Concordat of 1801 with the First Consul Napoleon. While not effecting a return to the old Christian order, the treaty did provide certain civil guarantees to the Church, acknowledging "the Catholic, Apostolic, and Roman religion" as that of the "majority of French citizens".

The main terms of the concordat between France and the pope included:

- A proclamation that "Catholicism was the religion of the great majority of the French" but was not the official religion, maintaining religious freedom, in particular with respect to Protestants.
- The Pope had the right to depose bishops.
- The state would pay clerical salaries and the clergy swore an oath of allegiance to the state.
- The church gave up all claims to church lands that were taken after 1790.
- Sunday was reestablished as a "festival", effective Easter Sunday, 18 April 1802.

As pope, he followed a policy of cooperation with the French Republic and subsequently Empire. He was present at the coronation of Napoleon in 1804.

=== Exile ===
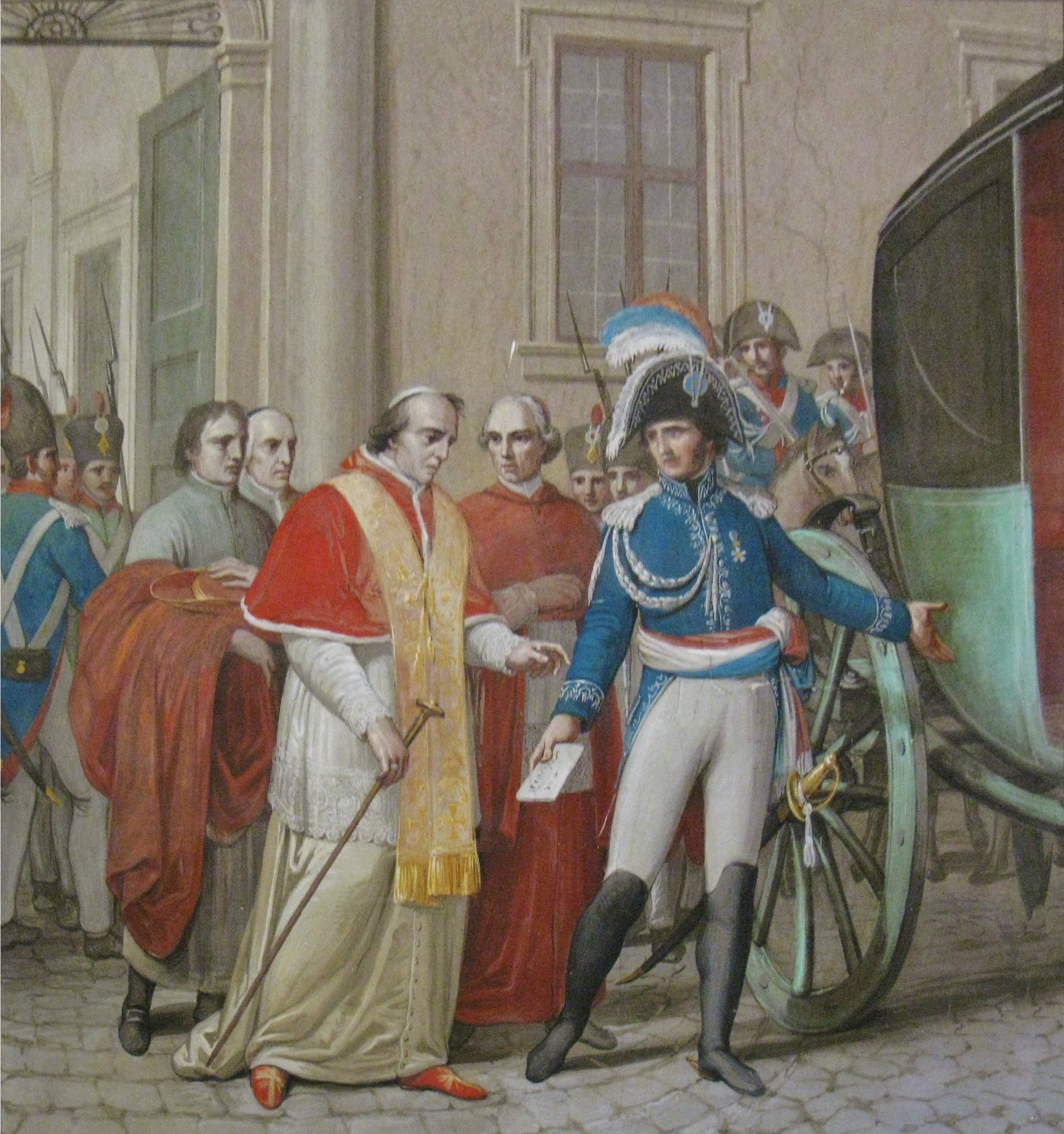
The arrest of Pius VII

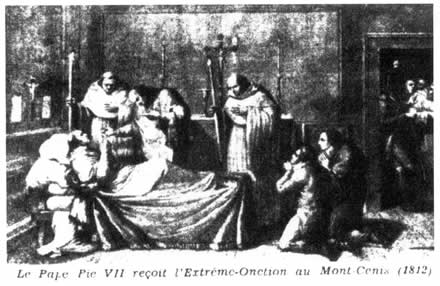
Pius VII receives extreme unction while Napoleon's prisoner in 1812.

Due to a reluctance to align the Papal States with the Continental System, France occupied and annexed the Papal States in 1809 and exiled Pius VII to Savona. On 15 November 1809 Pius VII consecrated the church at La Voglina, Valenza, Piedmont with the intention of the Villa La Voglina becoming his spiritual base whilst in exile. His residency was short lived once Napoleon became aware of his intentions of establishing a permanent base and he was soon exiled to France. Despite this, the pope continued to refer to Napoleon as "my dear son" but added that he was "a somewhat stubborn son, but a son still".

This exile ended only when Pius VII signed the Concordat of Fontainebleau in 1813. One result of this new treaty was the release of the exiled cardinals, including Consalvi, who, upon re-joining the papal retinue, persuaded Pius VII to revoke the concessions he had made in it. This Pius VII began to do in March 1814, which led the French authorities to re-arrest many of the opposing prelates. Their confinement, however, lasted only a matter of weeks, as Napoleon abdicated on 11 April of that year. As soon as Pius VII returned to Rome, he immediately revived the Inquisition and the Index of Condemned Books.

Cardinal Bartolomeo Pacca, who was kidnapped along with Pope Pius VII, took the office of Pro-Secretary of State in 1808 and maintained his memoirs during his exile. His memoirs, written originally in Italian, have been translated into English (two volumes) and describe the ups and down of their exile and the triumphant return to Rome in 1814.

Pius VII's imprisonment did in fact come with one bright side for him. It gave him an aura that recognized him as a living martyr, so that when he arrived back in Rome in May 1814, he was greeted most warmly by the Italians as a hero.

=== Relationship with Napoleon I ===
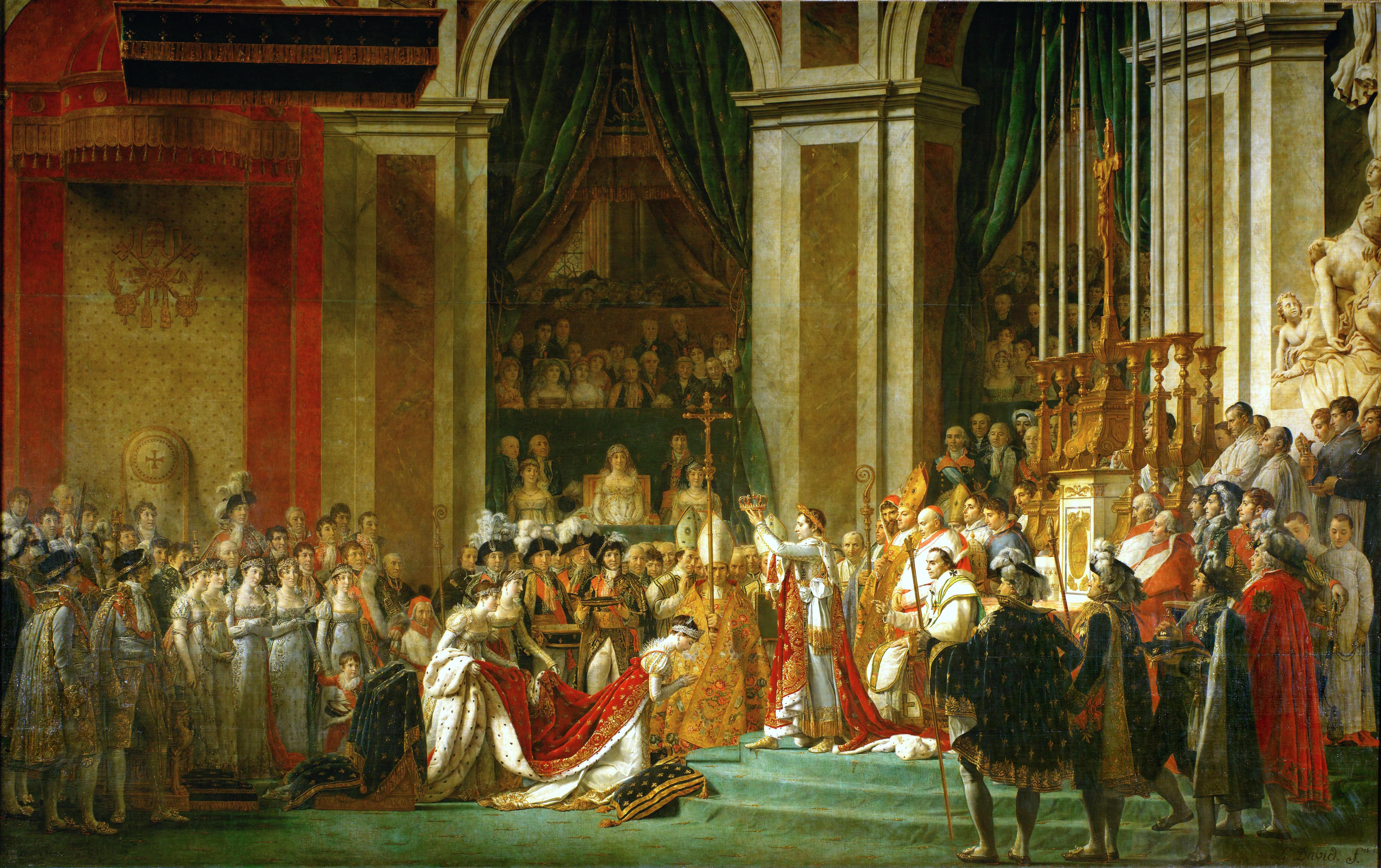
Pope Pius VII presided over the coronation of Napoleon I, as depicted by Jacques-Louis David.

From the time of his election as pope to the fall of Napoleon in 1815, Pius VII's reign was completely taken up in dealing with France. He and the Emperor were continually in conflict, often involving the French military leader's wishes for concessions to his demands. Pius VII wanted his own release from exile as well as the return of the Papal States, and, later on, the release of the 13 "Black Cardinals", i.e., the cardinals, including Consalvi, who had snubbed the marriage of Napoleon to Marie Louise, believing that his previous marriage was still valid, and had been exiled and impoverished in consequence of their stand, along with several exiled or imprisoned prelates, priests, monks, nuns and other various supporters.

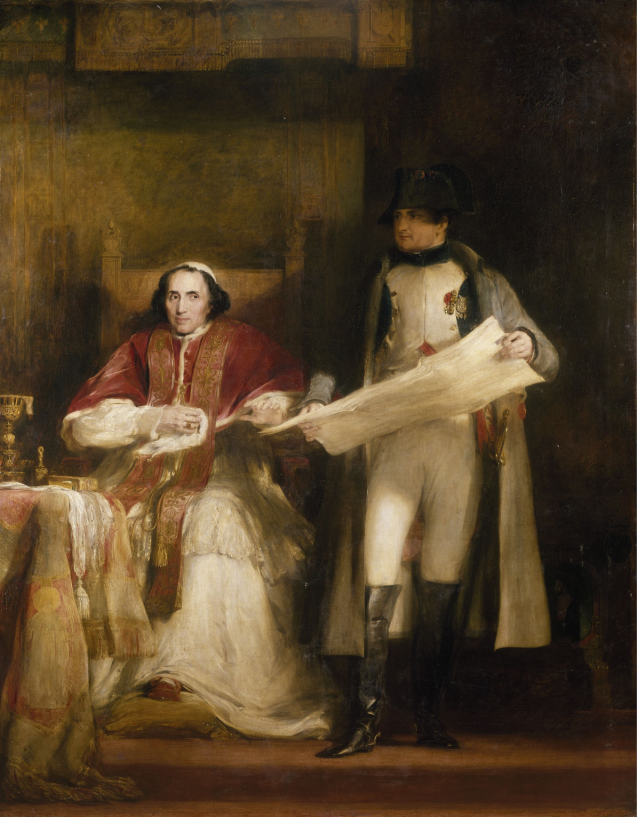
Napoleon and Pius VII at Fontainebleau by David Wilkie, 1836

=== Restoration of the Jesuits ===
On 7 March 1801, Pius VII issued the brief Catholicae fidei that approved the existence of the Society of Jesus in the Russian Empire and appointed its first superior general as Franciszek Kareu. This was the first step in the restoration of the order. On 31 July 1814, he signed the papal bull Sollicitudo omnium ecclesiarum which universally restored the Society of Jesus to its previous provinces, and the Jesuits began to resume their work in those countries. He appointed Tadeusz Brzozowski as the Superior General of the order.

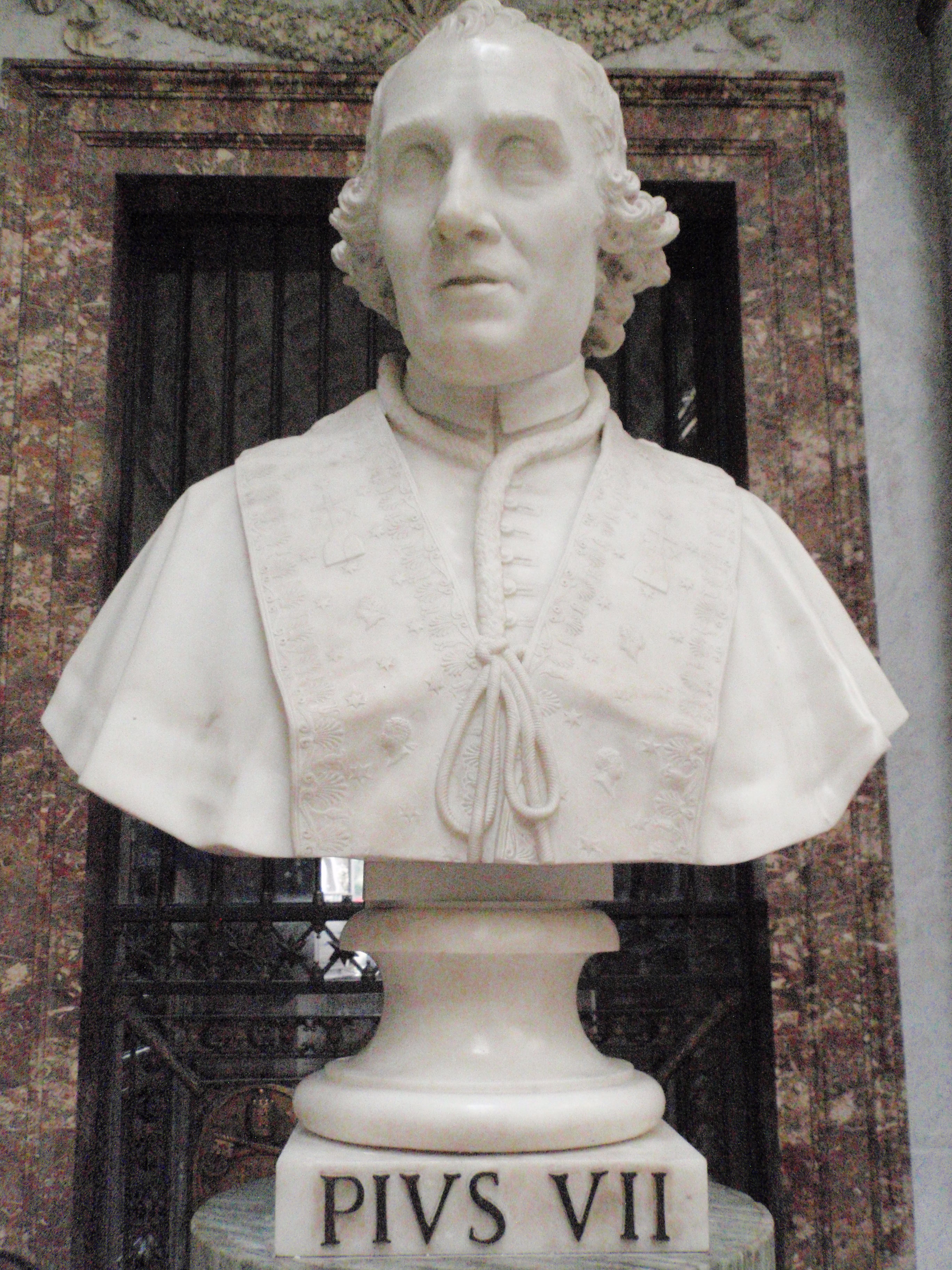
Vatican Museums

=== Opposition to slavery ===
Pius VII joined the declaration of the 1815 Congress of Vienna, represented by Cardinal Secretary of State Ercole Consalvi, and urged the suppression of the Atlantic slave trade. This pertained particularly to places such as Spain and Portugal where slavery was economically very important. The pope wrote a letter to King Louis XVIII of France dated 20 September 1814 and to King John VI of Portugal in 1823 to urge the end of slavery. He condemned the slave trade and defined the sale of people as an injustice to the dignity of the human person. In his letter to the king of Portugal, he wrote: "the pope regrets that this trade in blacks, that he believed having ceased, is still exercised in some regions and even more cruel way. He begs and begs the King of Portugal that it implement all its authority and wisdom to extirpate this unholy and abominable shame."

=== Reinstitution of Jewish Ghetto ===
Under Napoleonic rule, the Jewish Roman Ghetto had been abolished, and Jews were free to live and move where they pleased. Following the restoration of Papal rule, Pius VII re-instituted the confinement of Jews to the Ghetto, having the doors closed at night.

=== Other activities ===
Pius VII issued an encyclical Diu satis in order to advocate a return to the values of the Gospel and universalized the feast of Our Lady of Sorrows for 15 September. He condemned Freemasonry and the movement of the Carbonari in the papal bull Ecclesiam a Jesu Christo in 1821. Pius VII asserted that Freemasons must be excommunicated and it linked them with the Carbonari, an anti-clerical revolutionary group in Italy. All members of the Carbonari were also excommunicated.

His concerns about the work of non-Catholic bible societies were acknowledged by Pope Gregory XVI in the latter's 1844 encyclical letter Inter Praecipuas.

Pius VII was multilingual and had the ability to speak Italian, French, English and Latin.

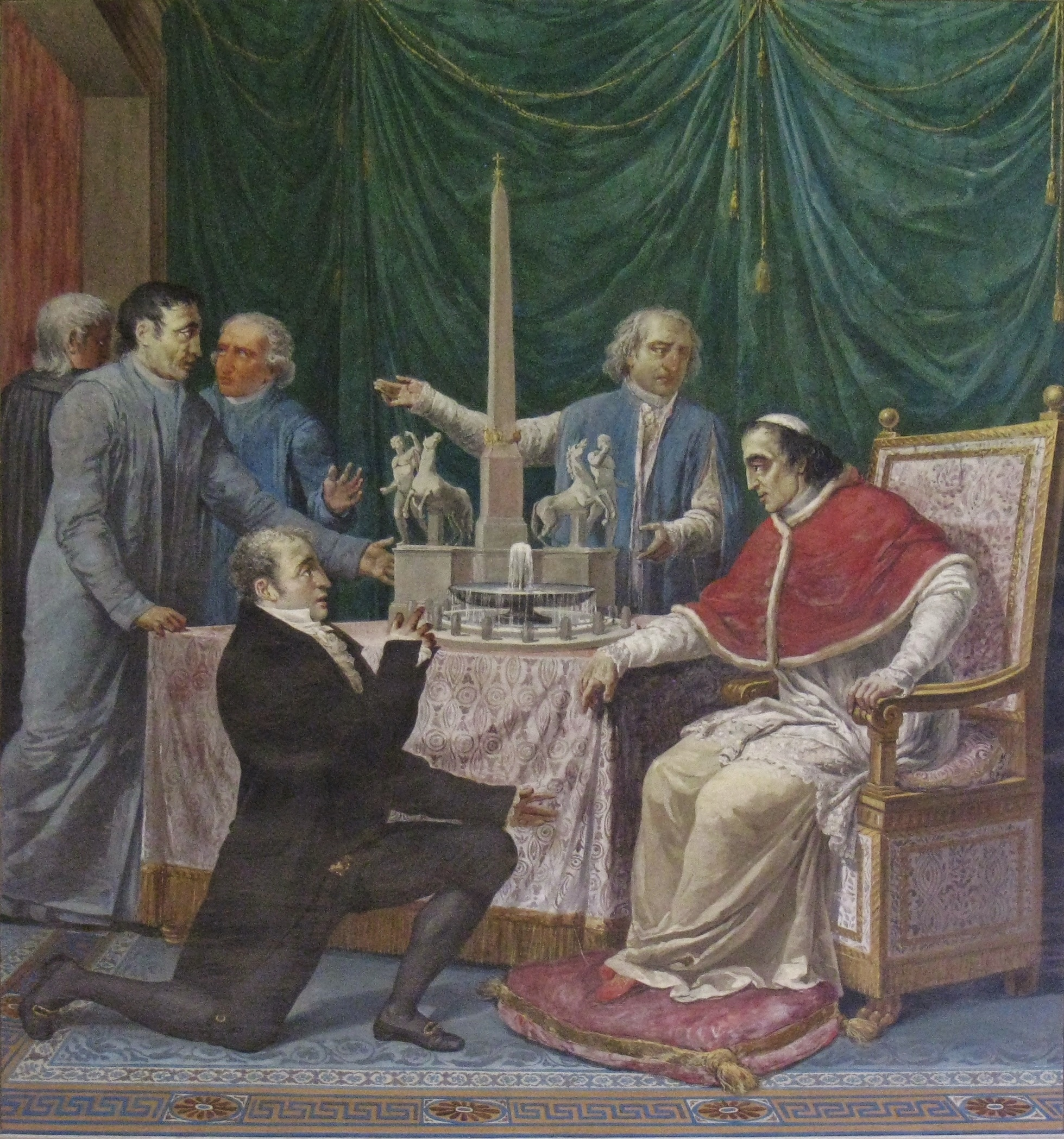
Pius VII reviews plans for the obelisk on the Quirinal Hill.

=== Cultural innovations ===
Pius VII was a man of culture and attempted to reinvigorate Rome with archaeological excavations in Ostia which revealed ruins and icons from ancient times. He also had walls and other buildings rebuilt and restored the Arch of Titus. He ordered the construction of fountains and piazzas and erected the obelisk on the Pincian Hill.

The pope also made sure Rome was a place for artists and the leading artists of the time like Antonio Canova and Peter von Cornelius. He also enriched the Vatican Library with numerous manuscripts and books. It was Pius VII who adopted the yellow and white flag of the Holy See as a response to the Napoleonic invasion of 1809.

=== Canonizations and beatifications ===
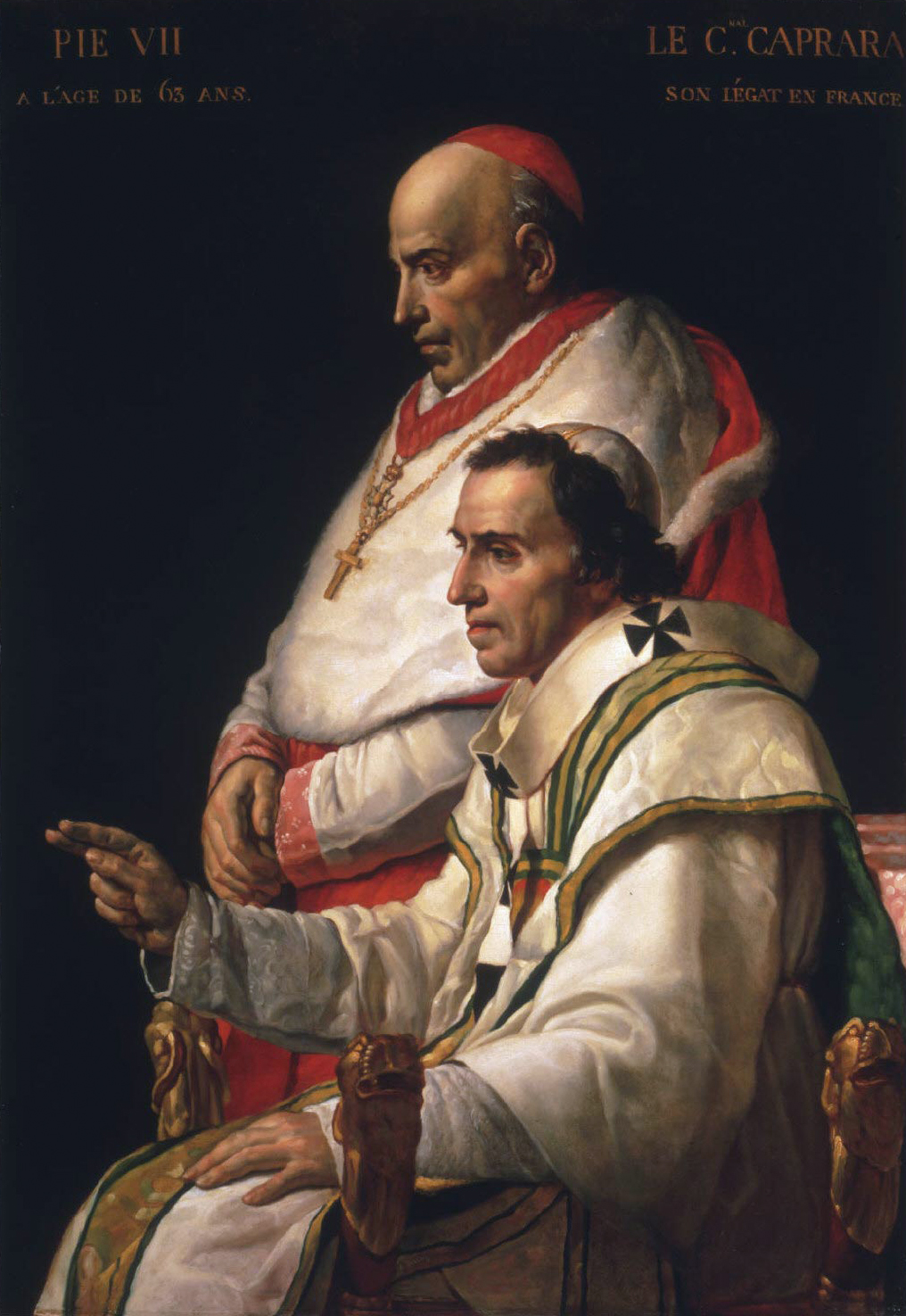
Portrait of Pope Pius VII and Cardinal Caprara by Jacques-Louis David c. 1805

Throughout his pontificate, Pius VII canonized five saints: Angela Merici, Benedict the Moor, Colette Boylet, Francis Caracciolo and Hyacintha Mariscotti. Furthermore, he beatified 27 individuals including Joseph Oriol, Berardo dei Marsi, Giuseppe Maria Tomasi and Crispin of Viterbo.

=== Consistories ===
Pius VII created 99 cardinals in nineteen consistories including notable ecclesial figures of that time such as Ercole Consalvi, Bartolomeo Pacca, and Carlo Odescalchi. The Pope also named his two immediate successors as cardinals: Annibale della Genga and Francesco Saverio Castiglioni (the latter of whom it is said Pius VII and his successor would refer to as "Pius VIII").

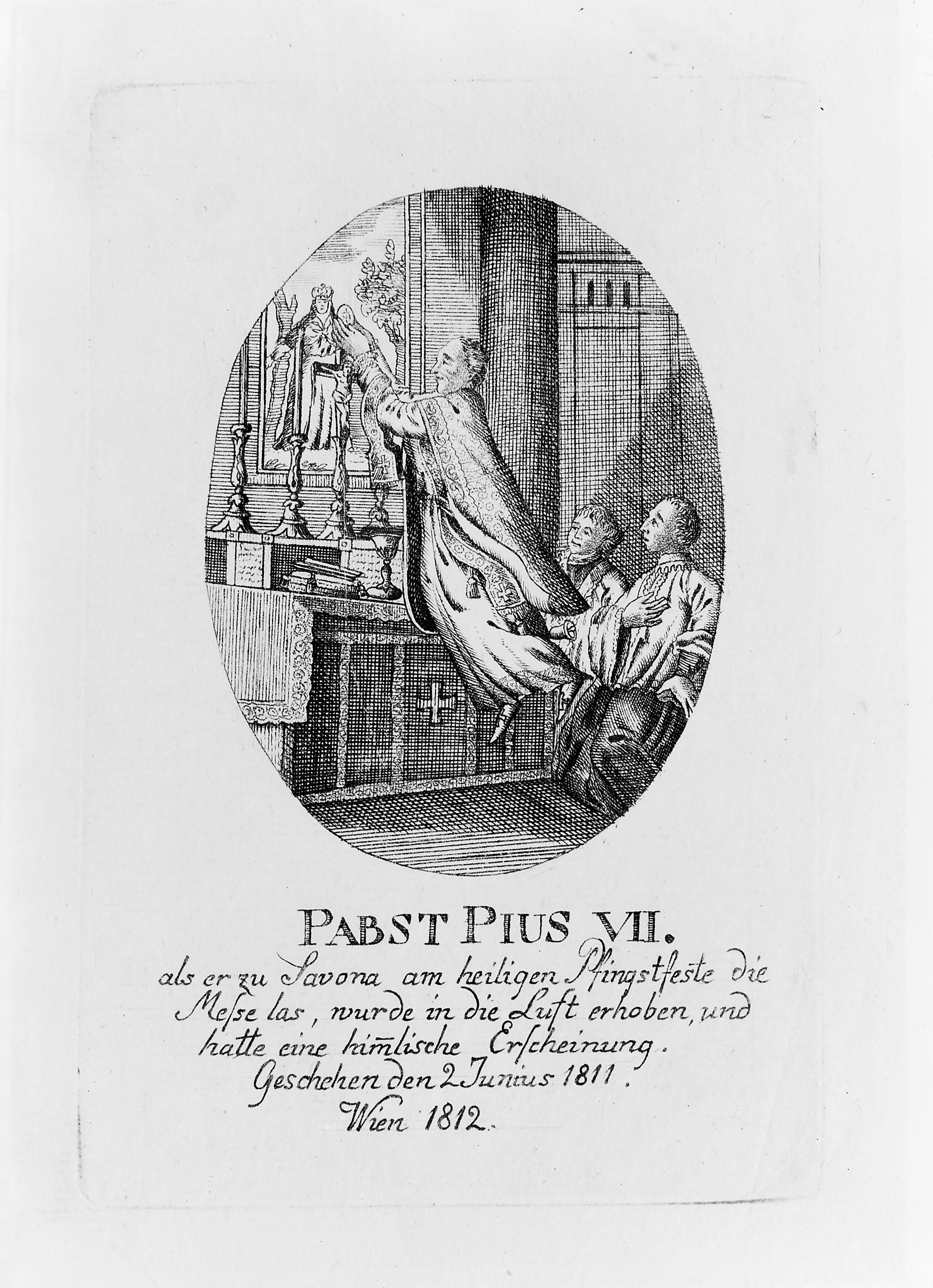
The "miracle" of Pius VII in 1811

In addition, Pius VII named 12 cardinals whom he reserved "in pectore". One died before his nomination could ever be published (he was originally nominated in the 1804 consistory), Marino Carafa di Belvedere resigned his cardinalate on 24 August 1807 upon citing a lack of family descendance, and Carlo Odescalchi resigned the cardinalate on 21 November 1838 to enter the Society of Jesus.

In 1801, according to Remigius Ritzler, Pius VII nominated Paolo Luigi Silva as a cardinal in pectore, however, he died before his name could be published. As a result, Pius VII added the Archbishop of Palermo Domenico Pignatelli di Belmonte in his place. In the March 1816 consistory, the former bishop of Saint-Malo Gabriel Cortois de Pressigny was among the cardinals created in pectore in the consistory, though he declined the promotion. Similarly, Giovanni Alliata declined the pope's offer for elevation in the same consistory. According to Niccolò del Re, the Vice-Camerlengo Tiberio Pacca would have been created a cardinal either in the March 1823 consistory, or a future one held by the pope. However, he suggests that a series of controversies beginning in 1820 prevented the pope from naming him to the Sacred College.

=== The possible miracle of Pius VII ===
On 15 August 1811 - the Feast of the Assumption - it is recorded that the pope celebrated Mass and was said to have entered a trance and began to levitate in a manner that drew him to the altar. This particular episode aroused great wonder and awe among attendants which included the French soldiers guarding him who were in disbelief of what had occurred.

=== Relationship with the United States ===
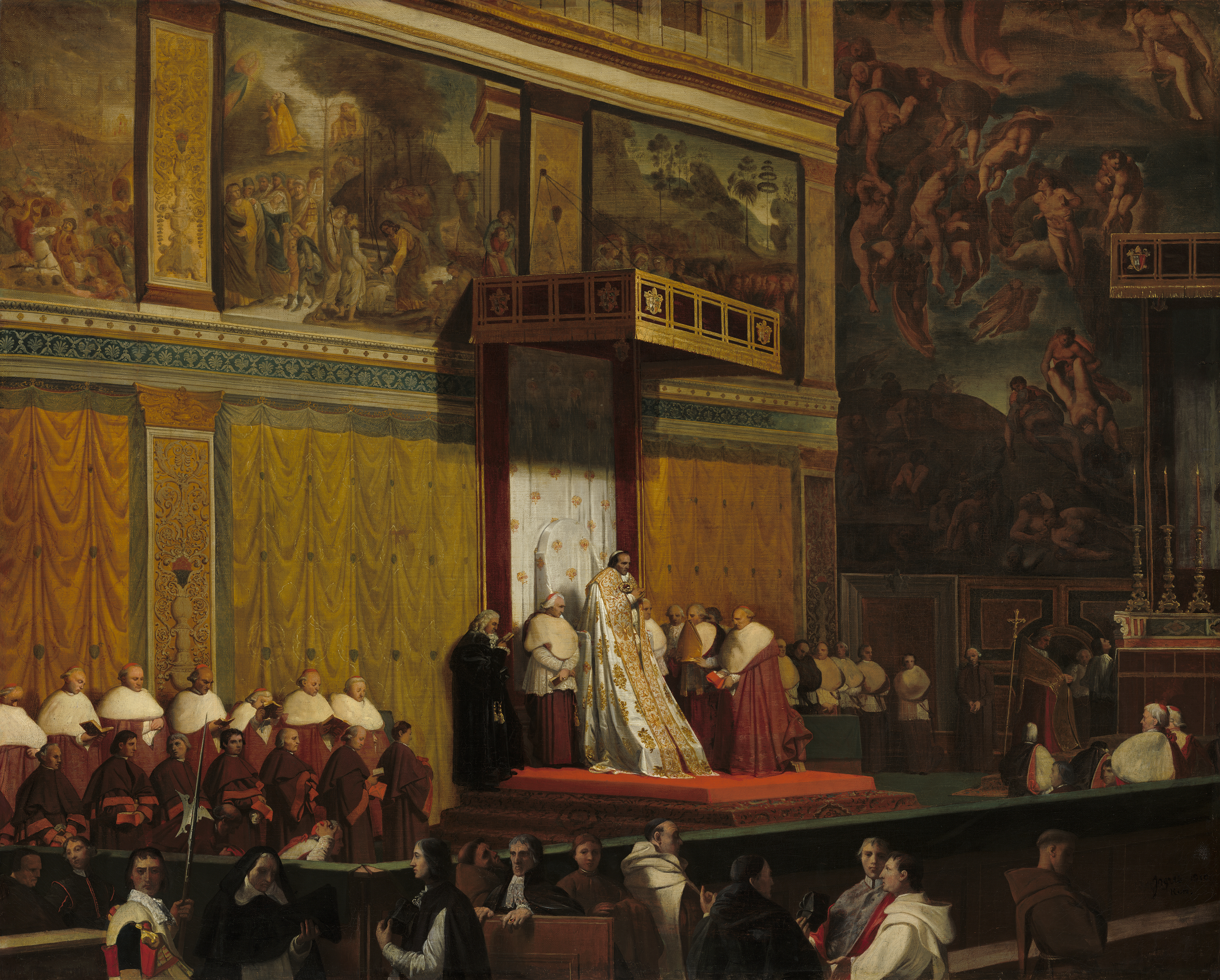
Pope Pius VII in the Sistine Chapel by Jean-Auguste-Dominique Ingres, 1814

On the United States' undertaking of the First Barbary War to suppress the Muslim Barbary pirates along the southern Mediterranean coast, ending their kidnapping of Europeans for ransom and slavery, Pius VII declared that the United States "had done more for the cause of Christianity than the most powerful nations of Christendom have done for ages."

For the United States, he established several new dioceses in 1808 for Boston, New York City, Philadelphia and Bardstown. In 1821, he also established the dioceses of Charleston, Richmond and Cincinnati.

=== Condemnation of heresy ===
On 3 June 1816, Pius VII condemned the works of Melkite bishop Germanos Adam. Adam's writings supported conciliarism, the view that the authority of ecumenical councils was greater than that of the papacy.

=== Death and burial ===
In 1822, Pius VII reached his 80th birthday and his health was visibly declining. On 6 July 1823, he fractured his hip in a fall in the papal apartments and was bedridden from that point onward. In his final weeks he would often lose consciousness and would mutter the names of the cities that he had been ferried away to by the French forces. With the Cardinal Secretary of State Ercole Consalvi at his side, Pius VII died on 20 August at 5 a.m.

He was briefly interred in the Vatican Grottoes but was later buried in a monument in St. Peter's Basilica after his funeral on 25 August.

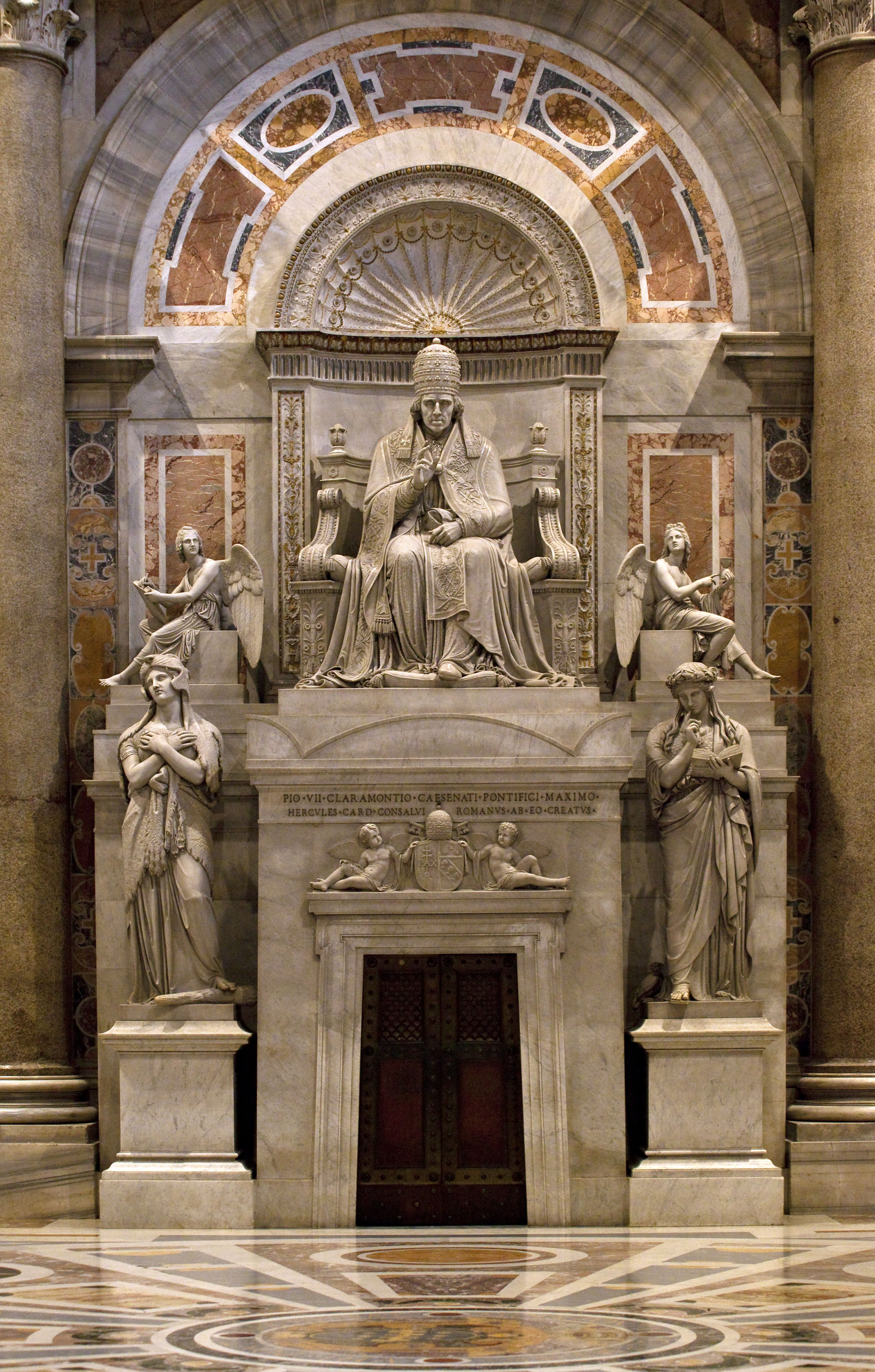
The tomb of Pius VII in Saint Peter's Basilica

== Beatification process ==
Servant of God Pius VII
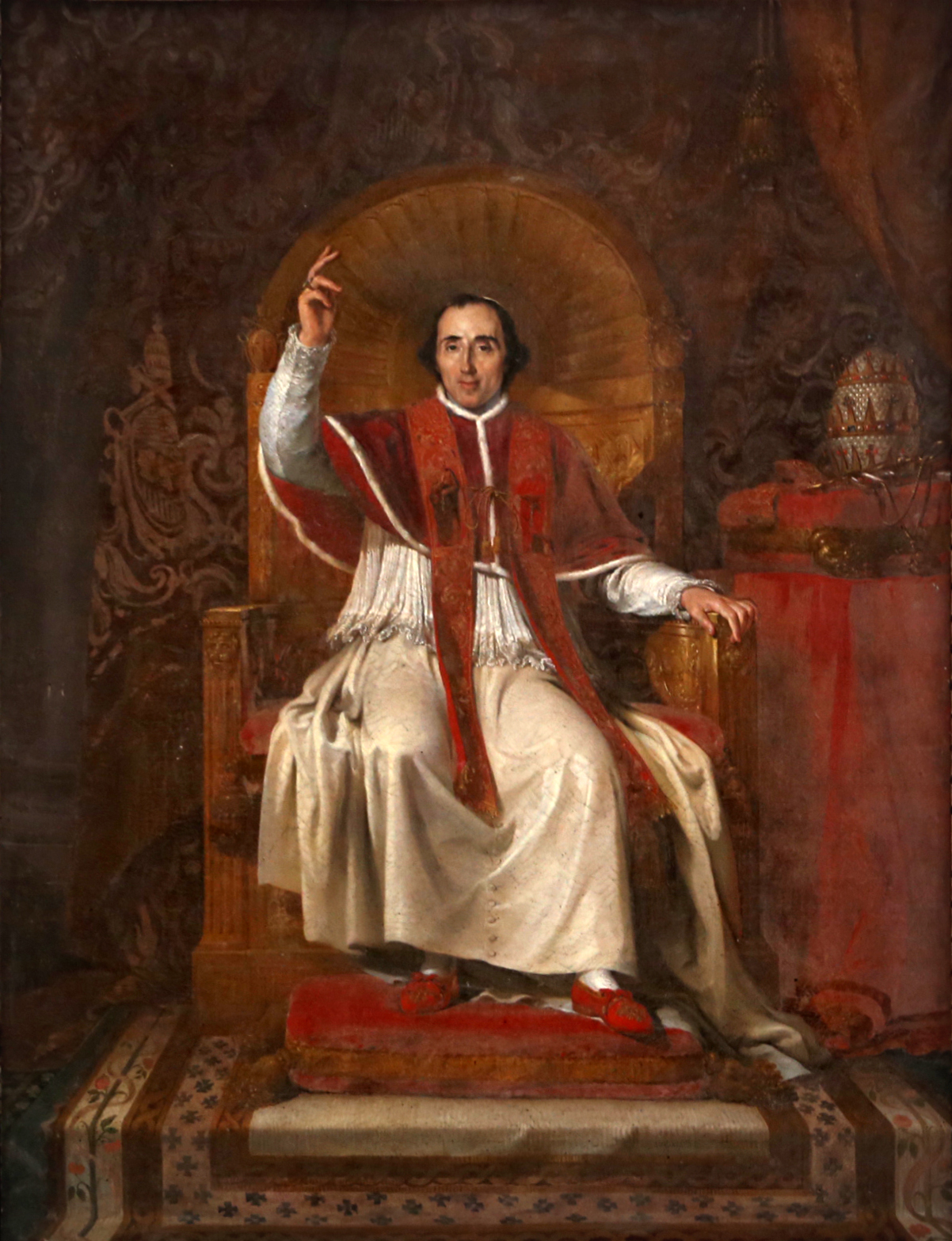
- Born: Barnaba Niccolò Maria Luigi Chiaramonti; 14 August 1742; Cesena, Papal States
- Died: 20 August 1823 (aged 81); Apostolic Palace, Rome, Papal States

An application to commence beatification proceedings were lodged to the Holy See on 10 July 2006 and received the approval of Cardinal Camillo Ruini (the Vicar of Rome) who transferred the request to the Congregation for the Causes of Saints. The Congregation—on 24 February 2007—approved the opening of the cause responding to the call of the Ligurian bishops.

On 15 August 2007, the Holy See contacted the diocese of Savona-Noli with the news that Pope Benedict XVI had declared "nihil obstat" (nothing stands against) the cause of beatification of the late pontiff, thus opening the diocesan process for this pope's beatification. He now has the title of Servant of God. The official text declaring the opening of the cause was: "Summus Pontifex Benedictus XVI declarat, ex parte Sanctae Sedis, nihil obstare quominus in Causa Beatificationis et Canonizationis Servi Dei Pii Barnabae Gregorii VII Chiaramonti". Work on the cause commenced the following month in gathering documentation on the late pope.

He has since been elected as the patron of the Diocese of Savona and the patron of prisoners.

In late 2018 the Bishop of Savona announced that the cause for Pius VII would continue following the completion of initial preparation and investigation. The bishop named a new postulator and a diocesan tribunal which would begin work into the cause. The formal introduction to the cause (a diocesan investigation into the late pontiff's life) was held at a Mass celebrated in the Savona diocese on 31 October 2021.

The first postulator for the cause was Father Giovanni Farris (2007–18) and the current postulator since 2018 is Fr. Giovanni Margara.

== Monuments ==
Pope Pius VII's monument (1831) in St. Peter's Basilica, adorning his tomb, was created by the Danish sculptor Bertel Thorvaldsen.

== Bibliography ==
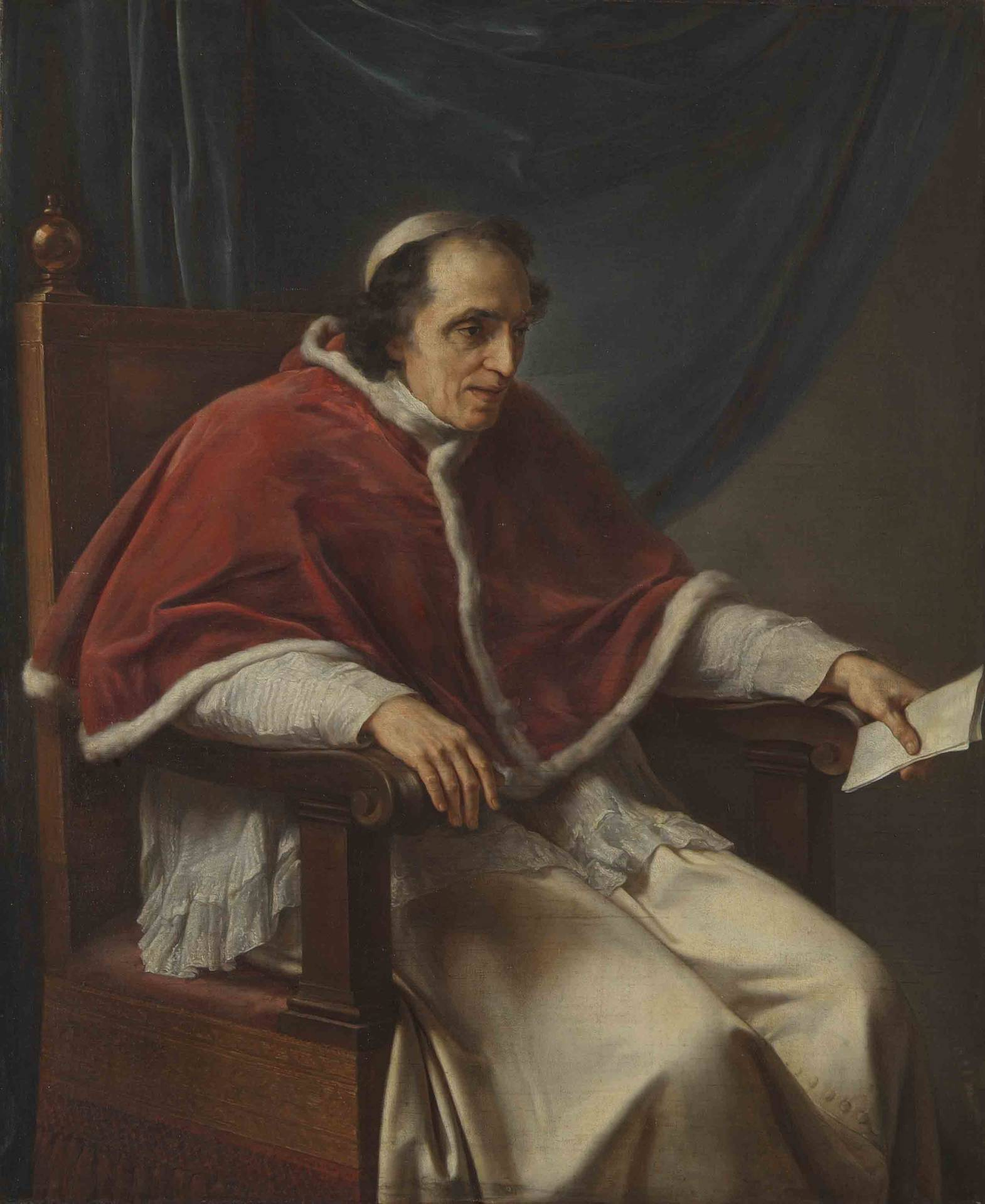
Portrait of Pope Pius VII by Vincenzo Camuccini, 1815

- Full list of Pius VII's writings (IT)

=== Encyclicals ===
- Diu Satis | Text (EN) | Text (IT)
- Ex quo Ecclesiam | Text (IT)
- Il trionfo | Text (IT)
- Vineam quam plantavit | Text (IT)

=== Motu proprio ===
- Le più colte | Text (IT)

=== Papal bulls ===
- De salute animarum ("For the salvation of souls"), issued on 16 July 1821
- Ecclesiam a Jesu Christo | Text (IT)

=== Papal briefs ===
- Magno et acerbo

== See also ==
- Apostolic Prefecture of the United States
- Cardinals created by Pius VII
- Jacob Anton Zallinger zum Thurn, papal councillor in German affairs (1805 - 1806)
- John Carroll, first US bishop
- List of popes
- Scipione Chiaramonti

== Notes ==
Catholic Church titles
Preceded by Giulio Matteo Natali	Bishop of Tivoli; 16 December 1782 – 14 February 1785	Succeeded by Giovanni Battista Banfi
Preceded by Giovanni Carlo Bandi	Bishop of Imola; 14 February 1785 – 8 March 1816	Succeeded by Antonio Lamberto Rusconi
Preceded by Tommaso Maria Ghilini	Cardinal-Priest of San Callisto; 26 June 1785 - 14 March 1800	Succeeded by Carlo Giuseppe Filippa della Martiniana
Preceded by Pius VI	Pope; 14 March 1800 – 20 August 1823	Succeeded by Leo XII
