= Portrait of Pope Pius VII (Lawrence) =

1819 painting by Thomas Lawrence

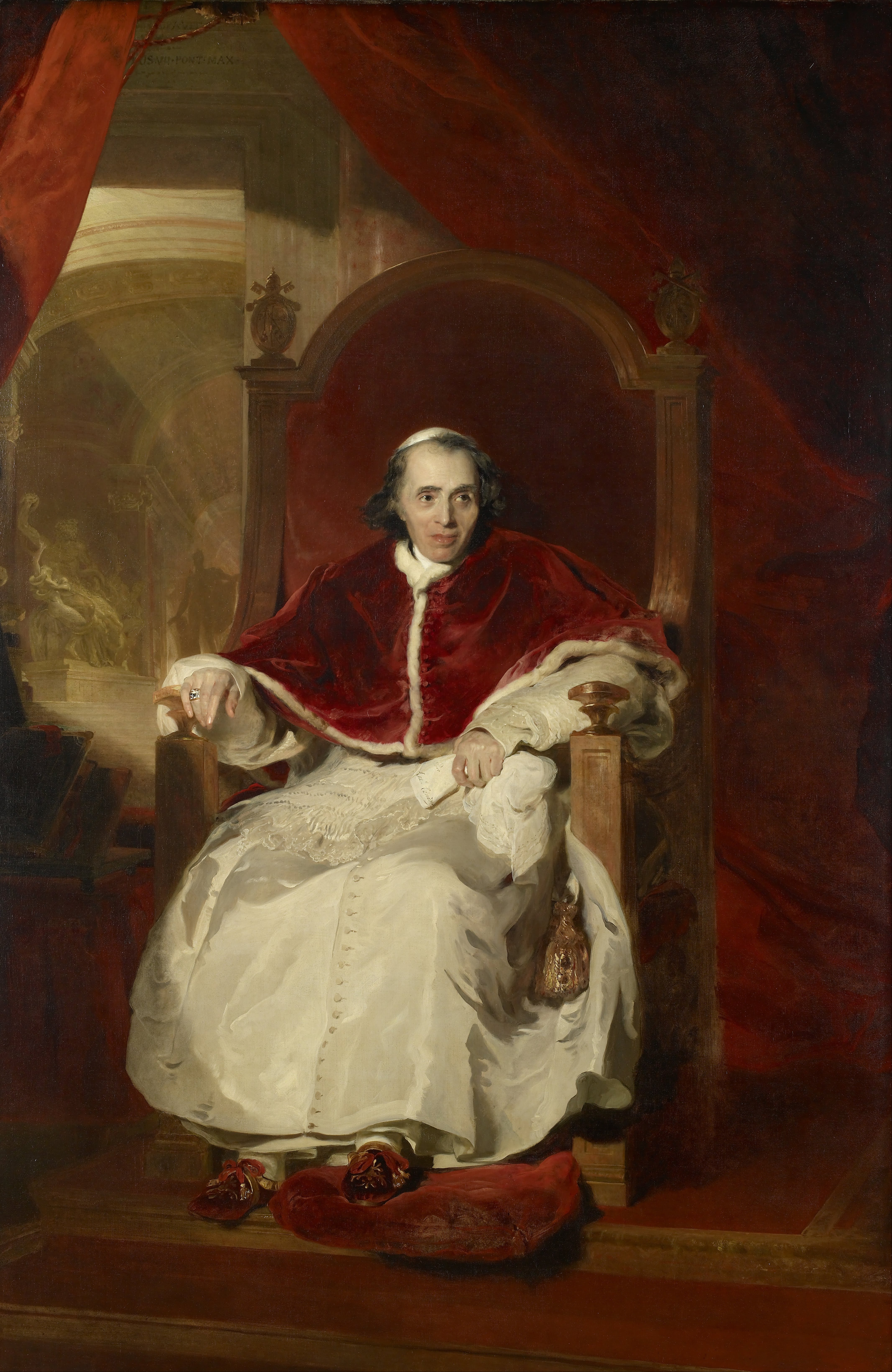
- Artist: Thomas Lawrence
- Year: 1819
- Type: Oil on canvas, portrait painting
- Dimensions: 269.4 cm × 178.3 cm (106.1 in × 70.2 in)
- Location: Royal Collection; Windsor Castle

Portrait of Pope Pius VII is an oil on canvas portrait painting by the English artist Sir Thomas Lawrence depicting Pope Pius VII at the Vatican, from 1819.

== History and description ==
The soon-to-be George IV commissioned Lawrence to paint portraits of leading European figures associated with the defeat of Napoleon in 1813-15. Lawrence travelled to the Congress of Aix-la-Chapelle in October 1818, where he painted several leaders, then proceeded to Vienna to create several more major works. Planning to return to London, he then received instructions to go to Rome, the capital of the Papal States, to do a portrait of Pius VII, head of the Catholic Church since 1800.

Pius had numerous disputes with the French Emperor during the Napoleonic Wars and had been held in custody in France for several years. Lawrence was granted unusual access to the pope as an English Protestant. While in Rome, Lawrence also produced a painting of Cardinal Ercole Consalvi. On his return to London in March 1820 he was elected President of the Royal Academy in succession to Benjamin West.

Today the painting remains in the Royal Collection and hangs in the Waterloo Chamber at Windsor Castle, along with numerous other Lawrence depictions of the victorious European leaders.

== See also ==
- Portrait of Pope Pius VII, an 1805 painting by Jacques-Louis David

== Bibliography ==
- Corkery, James & Worcester, Thomas. The Papacy Since 1500: From Italian Prince to Universal Pastor. ISBN 0521729777. Cambridge University Press, 2010.
- Goldring, Douglas. Regency Portrait Painter: The Life of Sir Thomas Lawrence. ISBN 1014181941 Macdonald, 1951.
- Herrmann, Luke. Nineteenth Century British Painting. ISBN 1900357178. Charles de la Mare, 2000.
- Levey, Michael. Sir Thomas Lawrence. ISBN 0300109989. Yale University Press, 2005.
