= Portrait of Pope Pius VII =

Painting by Jacques-Louis David

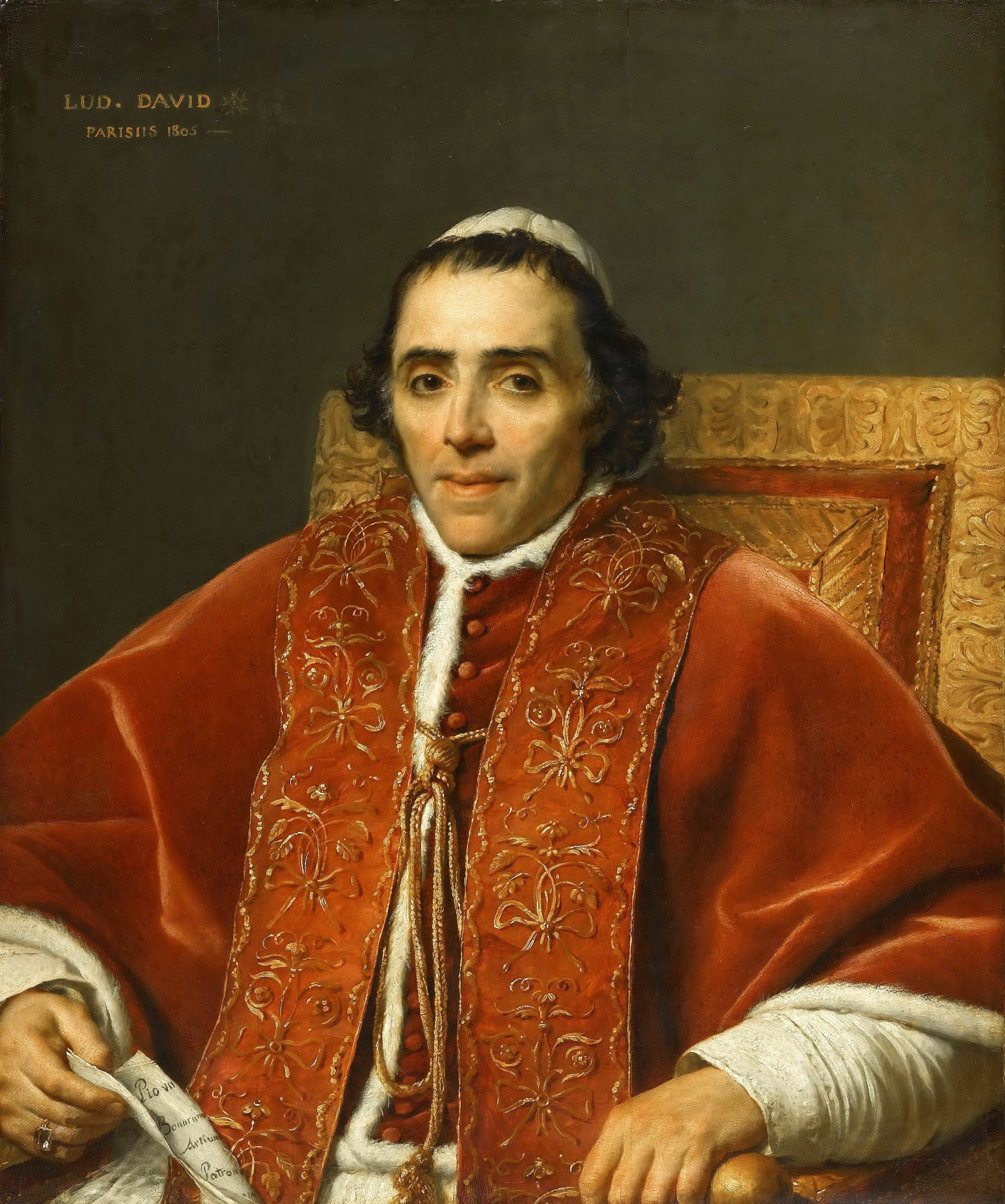
- Artist: Jacques-Louis David
- Year: 1805
- Type: oil on wood
- Dimensions: 86 cm × 71 cm (34 in × 28 in)
- Location: Louvre, Paris, France

The Portrait of Pope Pius VII is an 1805 portrait of Pope Pius VII by the French painter Jacques-Louis David to thank the Pope for assisting at the coronation of Napoleon I of France. Pope Pius appears in David's The Coronation of Napoleon, depicted as blessing the Emperor, when in fact he was merely a spectator, assisting at the ceremony with a resigned expression throughout.

== History ==
The painting seems to have been commissioned by Count Charles Fleurieu, Quartermaster General for the French emperor, though no written mention of a commission survives. It was painted at the Tuileries Palace around the end of February 1805 from life. David seems to have been won over and impressed by Pius's simplicity and deep humanity, choosing to show him in an introspective pose rather than as the most powerful prelate in Christianity. He was paid 10,000 francs for his work and the portrait was exhibited in the Gallery of the French Senate at its seat in the Luxembourg Palace and then assigned to the Musée Napoléon (now known as the Louvre). It was displayed again at the Luxembourg Palace in 1824 before being returned to its permanent home in the Louvre in 1827.

David produced three copies of the portrait, assisted by one of his students (probably Georges Rouget), two of which were commissioned by Napoleon for the Palace of Fontainebleau and for the Palace of Versailles. David held onto the third copy and took it with him during his exile to Brussels, and which is now lost.

== Description ==
Vertical in format and with a brown background, the painting shows Pius three-quarter-length seated on a red velvet chair embroidered in gold. He has a peaceful expression and wears a white zucchetto, a white rochet or tunic (of which only the sleeves can be seen), a red velvet pelerine-type camail with ermine cuffs and a red stole with gold embroidery. Pius's arms rest on the chair's arms and his right hand holds a paper on which is written in Latin Pio VII Bonarium Artium Patron (Pius VII, Patron of the Fine Arts). The painting is signed top left with LUD. DAVID PARISIIS 1805.

Some contemporary critics disliked the severe cropping of the picture, who thought it made the Pope seem cramped.

== See also ==
- List of paintings by Jacques-Louis David
- Portrait of Pope Pius VII, an 1819 painting by Thomas Lawrence
