= Giovanni Battista Caprara =

Italian cardinal

His Eminence Giovanni Battista Caprara
- Cardinal, Archbishop of Milan
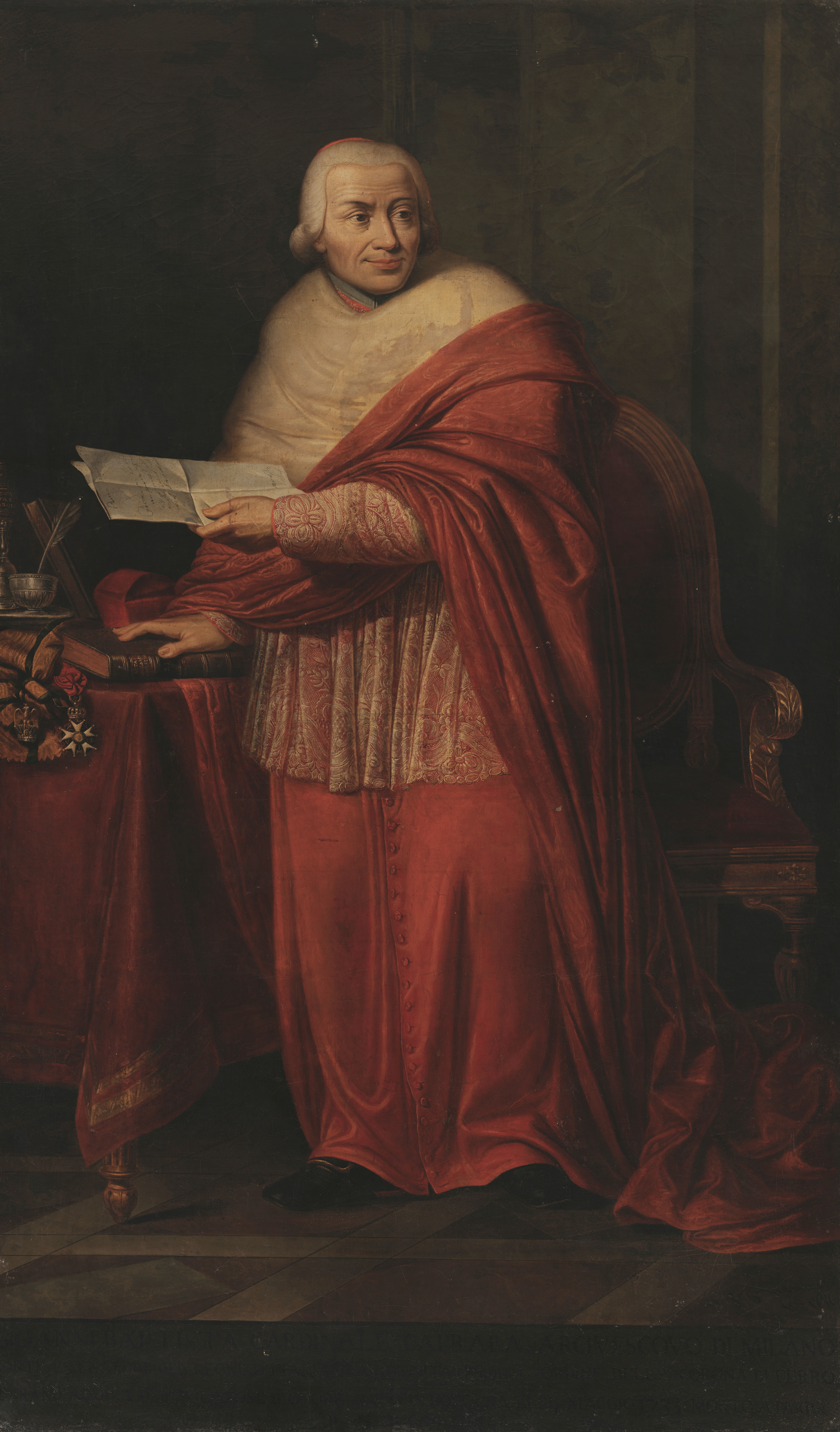
- Portrait of Cardinal Caprara (c. 1811)
- Church: Roman Catholic Church
- See: Milan
- Appointed: 24 May 1802
- Term ended: 21 June 1810
- Predecessor: Filippo Maria Visconti
- Successor: Carlo Gaetano Gaisruck
- Other post: Cardinal Priest of Sant'Onofrio

Orders
- Consecration: 8 December 1766 (Bishop) by Pope Clement XIII
- Created cardinal: 18 June 1792 by Pope Pius VI

Personal details
- Born: 29 May 1733 Bologna, Papal States
- Died: 21 June 1810 (aged 77) Paris, French Republic
- Buried: Cathedral of Milan
- Coat of arms: Giovanni Battista Caprara's coat of arms

Giovanni Battista Caprara Montecuccoli (1733 – 1810) was an Italian statesman and cardinal and archbishop of Milan from 1802 to 1810. As a papal diplomat, he served in the embassies in Cologne, Lausanne, and Vienna. As Legate of Pius VII in France, he implemented the Concordat of 1801, and negotiated with the Emperor Napoleon over the matter of appointments to the restored hierarchy in France. He crowned Napoleon as King of Italy in Milan in 1805.

== Early life ==
Caprara was born at Bologna on 29 May 1733 to Count Francesco Raimondo Montecuccoli and Countess Maria Vittoria Caprara. He took his maternal surname since she was the last of her line of the Capraras. He was the brother of Count Alberto Caprara, a general and diplomat in the service of Austria.

He studied at the Collegio Nazareno in Rome, and earned a doctorate in utroque iure at the Sapienza University of Rome on 23 September 1755.

With his doctorate in law, Caprara was appointed in 1755 referendary of the Tribunals of the Apostolic Signature; from 1758 to 1761, he served as vice-legate of the papal state of the Romandiola, with its capital at Ravenna. Caprara was ordained a priest on 22 December 1765. Appointed titular archbishop of Iconium on 1 December 1766, he was consecrated bishop in the Quirinal Palace on 8 December 1766 by Pope Clement XIII.

== Nuncio ==
Following his appointment as titular bishop, Caprara was named Apostolic Nuncio to Cologne on 18 December 1766. He served until 1775. In Cologne, he made an effort to deal with the difficulties raised by Febronianism. In 1772, he visited the Netherlands and was sent by Pope Clement XIV as his personal agent to the United Kingdom, where he was presented to King George III by the Austrian ambassador. His mission was to explore the possibilities of Catholic Emancipation in the United Kingdom, particularly in Ireland. In one of his meetings with the King, he was requested to procure a certain medicine, which, in due course, Pope Clement forwarded to George III. When Caprara's mission became a matter of public knowledge, Pope Clement was denounced in various cities as a heretic, and anti-Catholic sentiment in England was aroused to the point that the British government severed its contacts with the Papacy. It was not until six years later that the matter of emancipation could be brought up again, with the Papists Act 1778. Back in Cologne, when the Jesuits were suppressed in 1773, it fell to Caprara to attempt, over the considerable objections of the three ecclesiastical Electors of the Holy Roman Empire, to carry out the provisions of Pope Clement XIV's bull of suppression of 21 July 1773, Dominus ac Redemptor.

Due to health problems (the official reason, but actually at the request of the Empress Maria Theresa), on 6 September 1775, Caprara was appointed nuncio at Lucerne. In 1785, he was transferred to Vienna, where he remained until 1793. The papal Secretary of State (prime minister), Cardinal Francesco Saverio de Zelada (1789–1796), was dissatisfied with his conduct in Vienna. Caprara, with his compliant and passive nature, did not oppose the religious reforms undertaken by Joseph II, who was attempting to make the Catholic Church in his empire the tool of the state, and independent of the papacy.

In order to end his tenure of the nunciature in Vienna in an honourable way, on 18 June 1792, Caprara was promoted Cardinal Priest by Pope Pius VI, with the titular church of Sant'Onofrio in Rome. In Rome he was appointed a member of the Congregations of Bishops and Regulars, Propaganda, Good Government (economic affairs of the Papal States), and the Consulta (the main council of state of the Papal states and appellate tribunal), in the Roman Curia. He was also Protector of the Order of Carmelites. From 21 February 1794 to 1 June 1795 Caprara served as Chamberlain of the College of Cardinals. When Napoleon in 1796 conquered North Italy during the War of the First Coalition, Caprara, perhaps to protect his own estates in Bologna, took a stand in favor of the newly created Transpadane Republic even though the Napoleonic republic had in its agenda strong anticlerical measures. In this period, he got the reputation of being a "Jacobin Cardinal". He supported the Treaty of Tolentino in 1797 which imposed terms of surrender on the Papal States. He fell into complete disgrace in the eyes of Pope Pius VI.

== Conclave of 1799–1800 ==
Caprara participated in the Papal conclave in Venice from November 1799 to March 1800. He was one of the cardinals absolutely excluded from consideration as pope, as far as the Austrian government was concerned. He himself was a supporter of Cardinal Carlo Bellisomi, and an opponent of Cardinal Alessandro Mattei, who had signed the Treaty of Tolentino with Napoleon. Caprara was particularly interested in that treaty, since it had surrendered the Three Legations of the Papal States, including Caprara's native Bologna, to the French. During the Conclave, in early January, he approached the Austrian representative, Cardinal František Hrzán z Harras, with the observation that the choice of a person who was not recommended by the Austrian Court (as was Mattei) would make a better impression during negotiations for the return of the Legations. Hrzan replied that the Legations had been detached from the Papal States by a solemn treaty which had been signed by the Pope, and that they had been conquered by Austrian troops from the Cisalpine Republic. Conquest was a more solid claim. According to Cardinal Hrzan's report to the Austrian Emperor, when Cardinal Gregorio Barnaba Chiaramonti began to be talked about seriously on 11 March, his candidacy was resisted by Cardinals Borgia, Doria, Maury, Pignatelli, and Caprara, even up to the final vote. Hrzan speculated that the new pope would place little confidence in them. After the Conclave, Caprara requested that Hrzan use his influence with the Austrian government to see to it that his income from his benefice at S. Maria della Grazie in Bologna was paid.

The Emperor Francis wanted the new Pope, Pius VII, to come to Vienna, though the Pope himself was eager to get to Rome, and intended to take the land route through Bologna, Caprara's home. This was unacceptable to Austria, which was in possession of Bologna and wanted no unrest. Pius was therefore sent by sea to Ancona. The Austrians were agitated, moreover, by the fact that Caprara was intriguing to be made Archbishop of Bologna. Pius himself, however, assured the Austrian diplomat Filippo Ghislieri that he had never thought seriously about naming Caprara to the vacant See of Bologna.

Caprara had good relations with Pius VII, with whom he travelled back to Rome. During the voyage from Venice to Ancona, Caprara expected to be named Administrator of the diocese of Ancona and subsequently Bishop of the diocese. At the end of June 1800, however, Cardinal Bussi de Pretis, Bishop of Jesi, died, and it immediately became the gossip of the Papal Court en route that Caprara was being considered as his successor. The Pope appeared to be somewhat disposed to favour the prospect, which was certain enough by 24 July for Caprara to travel to Jesi to take possession of the diocese. Caprara's appointment as Bishop of Jesi came on 11 August 1800, when the Pope was in the March of Ancona.

== Legate in France ==
When the Concordat of 1801 between Pope Pius VII and the French First Republic was concluded, Napoleon Bonaparte, then First Consul, asked for the appointment of a papal legate with residence in Paris. Napoleon's choice fell upon Cardinal Caprara; he may have expected, in this way, little or no opposition to his plans. The suggestion may have been inspired by Count Azara. Caprara was appointed legate a latere for France in the Secret Consistory of 24 August 1801, and in the Public Consistory of 27 August. He departed Rome on 5 September, with a tiny suite of ten persons, for his destination, and arrived in Paris on 4 October.

In Caprara's instructions, there were two principal points. The first concerned the position of the Constitutional bishops, many of whom were supporters of the First Consul. Bonaparte wanted them to be reappointed to their dioceses, or at least to other dioceses. This presented grave spiritual and canonical problems for Pius VII, since the bishops were heretics and schismatics, and it would be impossible to appoint them to diocesan posts without a full confession of guilt, as well as retractation of their oaths to the Civil Constitution of the Clergy and submission to the judgment of the Pope. Caprara was to try to get Bonaparte to refrain from nominating (a right guaranteed in the new Concordat) any of the Constitutional bishops. Napoleon had no intention of complying with the Pope's demands. The second principal point had to do with the restoration of territories of the Papal States, which had been seized by the French armies during the wars in Italy. These included the Three Legations, which Napoleon intended to form a major part of his Italian Republic.

The principal negotiator for the French Consulate was Jean-Étienne-Marie Portalis, Minister of Religious Affairs (cultes). During the negotiations which followed concerning the execution of the Concordat of 1801, Caprara displayed a conciliatory spirit in dealing with the ten constitutional bishops who were to be appointed, at least according to Bonaparte's demand, to as many of the newly established dioceses; in fact, Caprara went contrary to specific instructions from Cardinal Consalvi in Rome, under persistent pressure exerted by Napoleon. On 15 March 1802, Bonaparte issued instructions to Portalis concerning the publication of the Concordat, and remarked that 50 bishops had to be named, 18 legitimate bishops living in France and twelve from the Constitutional clergy; of the 20 remaining, half would be Constitutionals. Five days later, realizing the number would be insufficient, he raised the number of 50 to 60 (fifty bishops and ten archbishops). He made his choices from the list supplied by Portalis. Caprara heard of the list of nominees on 30 March and was horrified to see that it contained the names of 10 Constitutional bishops, despite the apparent agreement of Bonaparte not to name any Constitutional bishops. On 10 April, Caprara insisted that these ten reject their errors, and he was supplied by Bonaparte's officials, Portalis and Bernier, with a letter signed by the ten bishops in which they renounced the Civil Constitution of the Clergy. Caprara took this as sufficient evidence of repentance, provided that they publicly confess their errors in the presence of Bernier and Pancemont. They informed Caprara that the conditions had been met, and on 17 April, Caprara instituted the ten bishops. The next day, Bernier and Pancemont denied the truth of the repentance, but it was Easter Day and the day of reconciliation, and the day on which two episcopal consecrations were to take place. Caprara had been deceived and manipulated, and the Holy See subsequently strongly criticized his actions.

The Concordat was officially approved by the votes of the Tribunate and the Legislative Assembly on 8 April 1802. At the same time and in the same bodies, Napoleon had 121 articles, called the Organic Articles, approved as laws of the French State. These articles had not been approved by the Papacy, and had not even been shown in their entirety to the Legate Caprara before entering into law. They were regarded by the French as amplifying the Concordat, though a number of them in fact contradicted it. The Pope had been tricked and circumvented.

Cardinal Caprara officiated at the Solemn restoration of public worship in Paris at the cathedral of Notre-Dame on Easter Day (18 April 1802), at which function the First Consul, the high officers of state, and the new ecclesiastical dignitaries assisted. The new Archbishop of Paris, the 92-year-old Jean-Baptiste de Belloy-Morangle, led the clergy. After the reading of the gospel of the day, twenty-seven bishops who were present knelt at the feet of Bonaparte and took a solemn oath of allegiance to the government and the French Republic.

On 5 May, Cardinal Consalvi, the Papal Secretary of State, wrote to Caprara, demanding explanations about the Constitutional bishops and about the ceremonies of 18 April, pointing out that the Pope's position had been and remained that the Constitutional bishops should have had no part in them. He also pointed out that all the newspapers, particularly those in German territory, were referring to the Organic Articles as though they were part of the Concordat.

On 27 May 1803, Pius VII wrote to Bonaparte, imploring him to modify the Organic Articles along lines suggested by the papal government. Napoleon's obstinate resistance was to be one of the principal reasons Pius decided to travel to Paris for the coronation of the emperor in 1804. In a letter of 18 August 1803, Caprara, too, protested against the Organic Articles for "establishing in France an ecclesiastical code without the cooperation of the Holy See.... The Church has received from God alone the authorization to decide questions of the doctrine of the faith or of the regulation of morals, and to make canons or rules of discipline." The Church, in fact, never accepted the Organic Articles, though it was powerless to prevent their enforcement.

== Archbishop of Milan ==
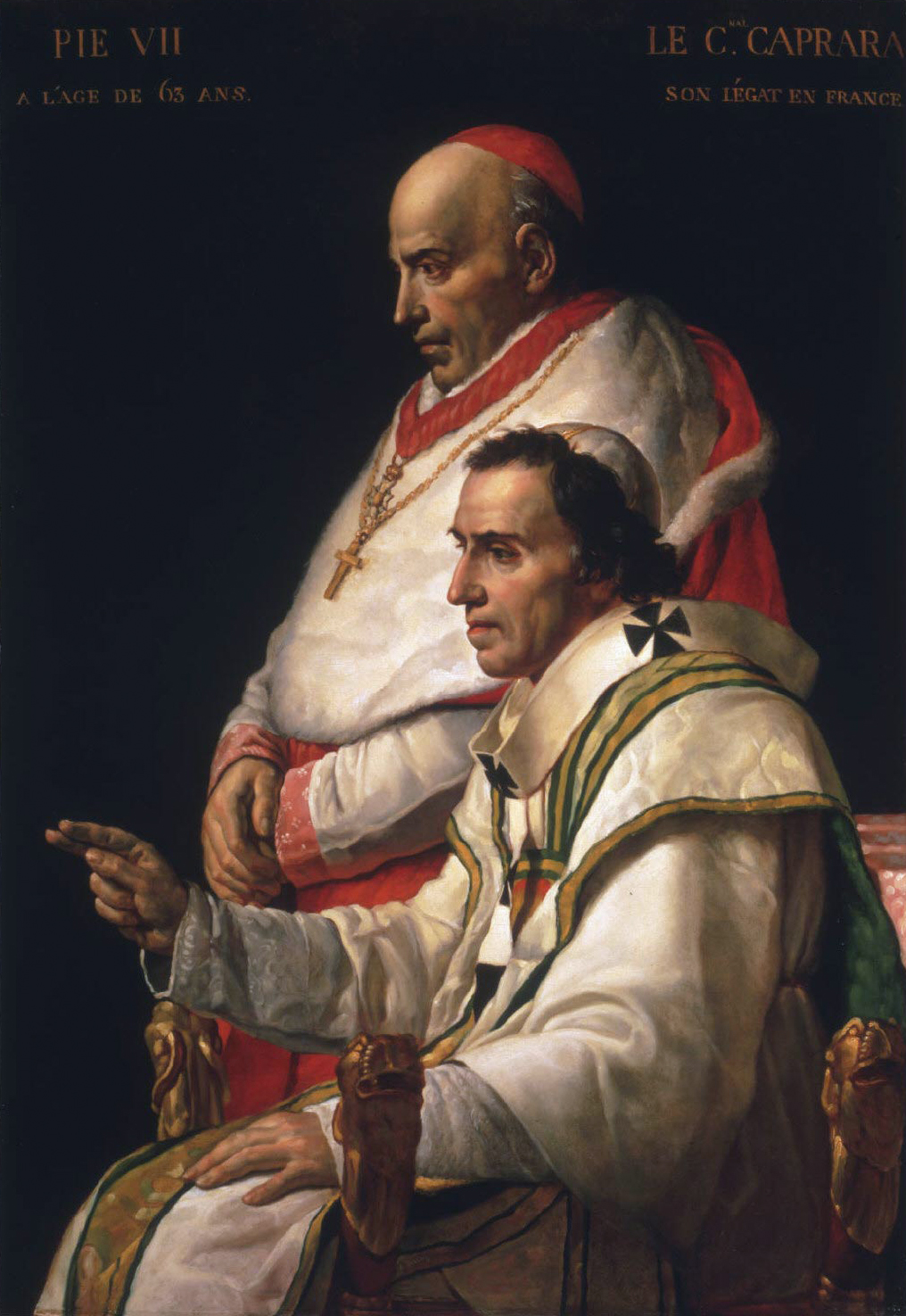
Pope Pius VII (foreground) with Cardinal Caprara (background). Painting by Jacques-Louis David

In November 1801 the Archbishop of Milan Filippo Maria Visconti was invited by Talleyrand to Lyon to participate in the founding of the Italian Republic, the work of First Consul Bonaparte; but on 30 December 1801, Visconti died there in Lyon while attending a formal banquet. Napoleon arrived in Lyon on 11 January 1802 and designated Caprara as the new Archbishop of Milan. Pope Pius VII concurred, so on 24 May 1802, Caprara was appointed to the post.

Caprara, however, retained his position as papal Legate in France until his death and continued to reside in Paris. He visited Milan only once, from 2 April 1805 to 26 July 1805, for the ceremonies of the Coronation of Napoleon as King of Italy in the Cathedral of Milan on 26 May 1805. It was the Cardinal's privilege to bless the Iron Crown of Lombardy, which Napoleon then placed on his own head. During the absence of Caprara from Milan, the diocese was ruled by the Vicar general, Carlo Bianchi, who had to deal with the anticlerical measures of the Kingdom of Italy, such as the imposition of an oath to the state Secretary of Cults to be taken by seminary professors, and the compulsory abolition of most confraternities.

== Last years ==
In 1806, Cardinal Caprara caused considerable consternation and offence when he authorized the publication of the Catechism of the French Empire. Among other things, Lesson 7 of Part I of the document mentioned Napoleon I by name and urged the faithful to do their duty to him, "firstly, because God... plentifully bestowing gifts upon our Emperor, whether for peace or for war, has made him the minister of his power, and his image upon earth.... He has become the anointed of the Lord by the consecration he has received from the Sovereign Pontiff, head of the universal church."

Caprara lived in Paris until his death. Relations between Napoleon and the Papal States became more and more difficult, especially with the implementation of the continental blockade against England, in which Pius VII refused to participate or to sanction. Caprara's desire to please Napoleon led to increasing dissatisfaction on the part of the Pope and the Secretary of State Cardinal Ercole Consalvi. The situation degenerated in 1808 when the Napoleonic army entered the Papal States on 3 February 1808, and General Miollis occupied Rome. In April 1808, Cardinal Caprara was ordered by Pius VII to demand his passports, that is to say, to quit his position as Legate and leave France. Caprara resigned as legate, but contrary to papal instructions did not leave Paris. On 10 June 1809, in the Bull Quum memoranda, Pius VII excommunicated "all those who after the invasion of Rome and the territory of the Church, and the sacrilegious violation of the Patrimony of St. Peter by French troops, have committed either at Rome in the States of the Church, in contravention of ecclesiastical immunities, and against the simple temporal rights of the Church and Holy See, either all or any of the outrages which have provoked our complaints; all authors, promoters, counsellors, or adherents of similar doings; all those, finally, who have contributed to facilitating the carrying out of these violent acts or have implemented them." The excommunication certainly included Napoleon I, Emperor of the French. On 5 July 1809, Pope Pius was arrested. Still in 1809, when Pope Pius VII was already captive in Savona, Caprara pleaded with the pope to support Napoleon. Declining health saved him from the embarrassment connected with the divorce and second marriage of Napoleon (April 1810).

Caprara died in Paris on 21 June 1810. By his last will, his estate was bequeathed to Milan's Ospedale Maggiore. By order of Napoleon, Caprara was given a solemn funeral and his body was entombed in the Panthéon of Paris (Crypt III), while his heart was buried in Milan Cathedral. During the Second Empire, his body was removed from the Panthéon and left Paris for Rome on 22 August 1861.

== Works ==
- Concordat et recueil des Bulles et Brefs de N. S. P. le Pape Pie VII, sur les affaires actuelles de l'Eglise de France: décret pour la nouvelle circonscription des archevêchés et évêchés; publication du Jubilé, et indult pour la réduction des fêtes. Paris: Le Clere. 1802.

== Notes and references ==
=== Bibliography ===
- Bordas-Charon, Jeannine (1975). Inventaire des archives de la légation en France du cardinal Caprara: 1801-1808. Paris: Archives nationales. ISBN 9782860000055.
- Bordas-Charon, Jeannine (1979). La Légation en France du cardinal Caprara: 1801-1808. Paris: Archives Nationales. ISBN 978-2-86000-034-5.
- Cazzani, Eugenio (1996). Vescovi e arcivescovi di Milano (in Italian). Milano: Massimo. pp. 262–265. ISBN 88-7030-891-X.
- Haussonville, Gabriel Paul Othenin de Cléron d' (1870). L'Eglise romaine et le Premier Empire 1800-1814 (in French). Vol. Tome premier (troisième ed.). Paris: Michel Lévy. Tome II. 1870. Tome III. 1870. Tome IV. 1870.
- Boulay de la Meurthe, Alfred (1897). Documents sur la négociation du concordat et sur les autres rapports de la France avec le Saint-Siège en 1800 et 1801 (in French and Italian). Vol. Tome V. Paris: Chez E. Leroux. Tome IV. 1895. 1895.
- Nielsen, Fredrik Kristian (1906). The History of the Papacy in the XIXth Century. London: J. Murray. pp. 223–259.
- Rinieri, Ilario (1903). La diplomatie pontificale au XIX siècle (in French and Latin). Paris: P. Letheilleux.
- Theiner, Augustin (1869). Histoire des deux concordats de la République Française et de la République Cisalpine conclus en 1801 et 1803 entre Napoléon Bonaparte et le Saint-Siège. Vol. Tome deuxiḕme. Bar-le-Duc: L. Guerin.

=== External links ===
- Shaefer, Francis J. (1913). "Giovanni Battista Caprara" . In Herbermann, Charles (ed.). Catholic Encyclopedia. New York: Robert Appleton Company.
- Salvador Miranda. "Caprara, Giovanni Battista".
- Pignatelli, Giuseppe (1976). "Caprara Montecuccoli, Giovanni Battista". Dizionario Biografico degli Italiani (in Italian). Vol. 19. Treccani.

=== Acknowledgment ===
Diplomatic posts
Preceded by Cesare Alberico Lucini	Apostolic Nuncio to Cologne; 1767 – 1775	Succeeded by Carlo Antonio Giuseppe Bellisomi
Preceded by Luigi Valenti Gonzaga	Apostolic Nuncio to Switzerland; 1775 – 1785	Succeeded by Giuseppe Vinci
