= Léonard Aléa =

French writer

Léonard Aléa was a French polemical writer of the early years of the nineteenth century, b. in Paris, date unknown; d. 1812.

He came from a family of bankers. He published anonymously in 1801 his first book, L'antidote de l'athéisme, and the following year a new edition appeared, enlarged to two volumes, with its title changed to La religion triomphante des attentats de l'impiété, and bearing the name of its author. The book was written to refute Sylvain Maréchal's Dictionnaire des Athées then lately published, and received a cordial welcome.

Marechal himself acknowledged his adversary's moderation. Cardinal Gerdil expressed his high appreciation of the work, and Portalis, to whom Alea had dedicated the second edition, was delighted with the book, and subsequently tried to get the author to enter the Council of State but without success. Aléa's only other work is Réflexions contre le divorce, which also appeared in 1802.
