= Paul-Thérèse-David d'Astros =

French Roman Catholic Cardinal and archbishop

His Eminence Paul d'Astros
- Archbishop of Toulouse
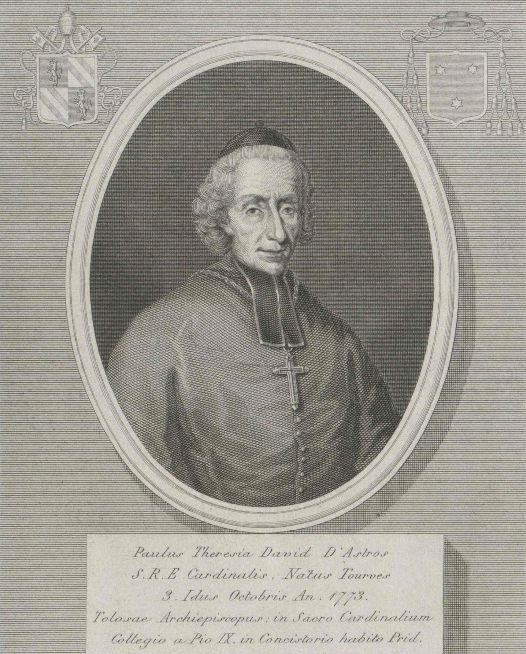
- Archdiocese: Toulouse
- Appointed: 28 March 1830
- Installed: 5 July 1830
- Term ended: 29 September 1851
- Predecessor: Anne-Antoine-Jules de Clermont-Tonnerre
- Successor: Jean-Marie Mioland
- Previous posts: Bishop of Saint-Flour (1820–1830); Bishop of Bayonne (1820); Bishop of Orange (1817–1820), Vicar Capitular of Paris (1808–1817); Apostolic Administrator of Paris (1808); Vicar General of Paris (1805–1808)

Orders
- Ordination: 23 September 1797
- Consecration: 9 July 1820 by Hyacinthe-Louis de Quélen
- Created cardinal: 30 September 1850 by Pope Pius IX
- Rank: Cardinal priest

Personal details
- Born: October 15, 1772 Tourves, Provence, Kingdom of France
- Died: September 29, 1851 (aged 78) Toulouse, France
- Buried: Cathedral of St. Stephen, Toulouse, France
- Denomination: Roman Catholic
- Parents: J.F.L. d'Astros & Marie-Madeleine-Angélique Portalis
- Coat of arms

Paul-Thérèse-David d'Astros (15 October 1772 – 29 September 1851) was a French Roman Catholic Cardinal and archbishop.

== Life ==
D'Astros was born at Tourves, then in the Province of Provence, the son of a notary. His mother was Marie-Madeleine-Angélique Portalis, daughter of Jean-Étienne-Marie Portalis, a prominent jurist who was later appointed by Napoleon as a member of the Council of State. As a child, he was initially tutored privately at home, but was later sent to study at a school in Marseille (possibly the same Oratorian school his grandfather had attended). In 1788, at the age of 16, he received the ecclesiastical tonsure, despite which he briefly entered military service five years later (1793-1794). Deciding to pursue a Church career instead, he received minor orders and was advanced to the subdiaconate in Paris the following year. He was ordained a Catholic priest in Marseille on 23 September 1797.

With the rise to power by Napoleon after the upheavals of the French Terror, D'Astros' grandfather was appointed the Minister of Public Worship by him. In this capacity, he was called upon to become engaged in the formulation of the Concordat of 1801 between the French First Republic and the Holy See. In 1806 he was to be the main editor of the Imperial Catechism. In 1805 he was appointed the Vicar General of the Archbishop of Paris, Jean-Baptiste de Belloy, and after the latter's death in 1808 was appointed as Apostolic Administrator of the archdiocese by the pope, serving until the appointment of Jean-Sifrein Maury, who then named him his Vicar Capitular. In this capacity, D'Astros received the papal bull issued by Pope Pius VII (10 June 1809) excommunicating Napoleon. For this act, he was imprisoned from January 1811 at Vincennes until his release in 1814 under the Bourbon Restoration.

In October 1817, D'Astros was named the bishop of a proposed Diocese of Orange. The diocese was never created and instead he was briefly appointed the Bishop of Saint-Flour on 21 February 1820 but was transferred to be the Bishop of Bayonne the following May. For this office, he was finally consecrated a bishop on 9 July 1820 in Paris by Hyacinthe-Louis de Quélen, coadjutor archbishop of Paris. In 1830 he was promoted to head the Archdiocese of Toulouse. At the request of Louis Napoleon, Pope Pius IX made him a cardinal on 30 September 1850.

D'Astros, however, died a year later, on 29 September 1851, without having formally received the red hat of this office, or being assigned a titular church in Rome. He was buried in his cathedral a week later.

== Writings ==
D'Astros wrote a noted polemic in defense of the Catholic faith in the face of tensions with the Protestant community of France: La vérité catholique démontrée; ou, Lettre aux Protestants d'Orthez (2 v. 8°, Toulouse, 1833). He was one of the earliest opponents of the liberal priest, Félicité de La Mennais, against whom he wrote Censure de divers écrits de La Mennais et de ses disciples per plusieurs évêques de France, et Lettres des mêmes évêques au souverain pontife, Grégoire XVI, etc. (Toulouse, 1835).
