= 1799–1800 conclave =

Election of Catholic Pope Pius VII

Papal conclave 1799–1800

Dates and location
- 30 November 1799 – 14 March 1800; San Giorgio Monastery, Venice, Venetia

Key officials
- Dean: Gian Francesco Albani
- Sub-dean: Henry Benedict Stuart
- Camerlengo: Romoaldo Braschi-Onesti
- Protopriest: Francesco di Traetto
- Protodeacon: Antonio Doria Pamphili
- Secretary: Ercole Consalvi

Elected pope
- Barnaba Chiaramonti; Name taken: Pius VII
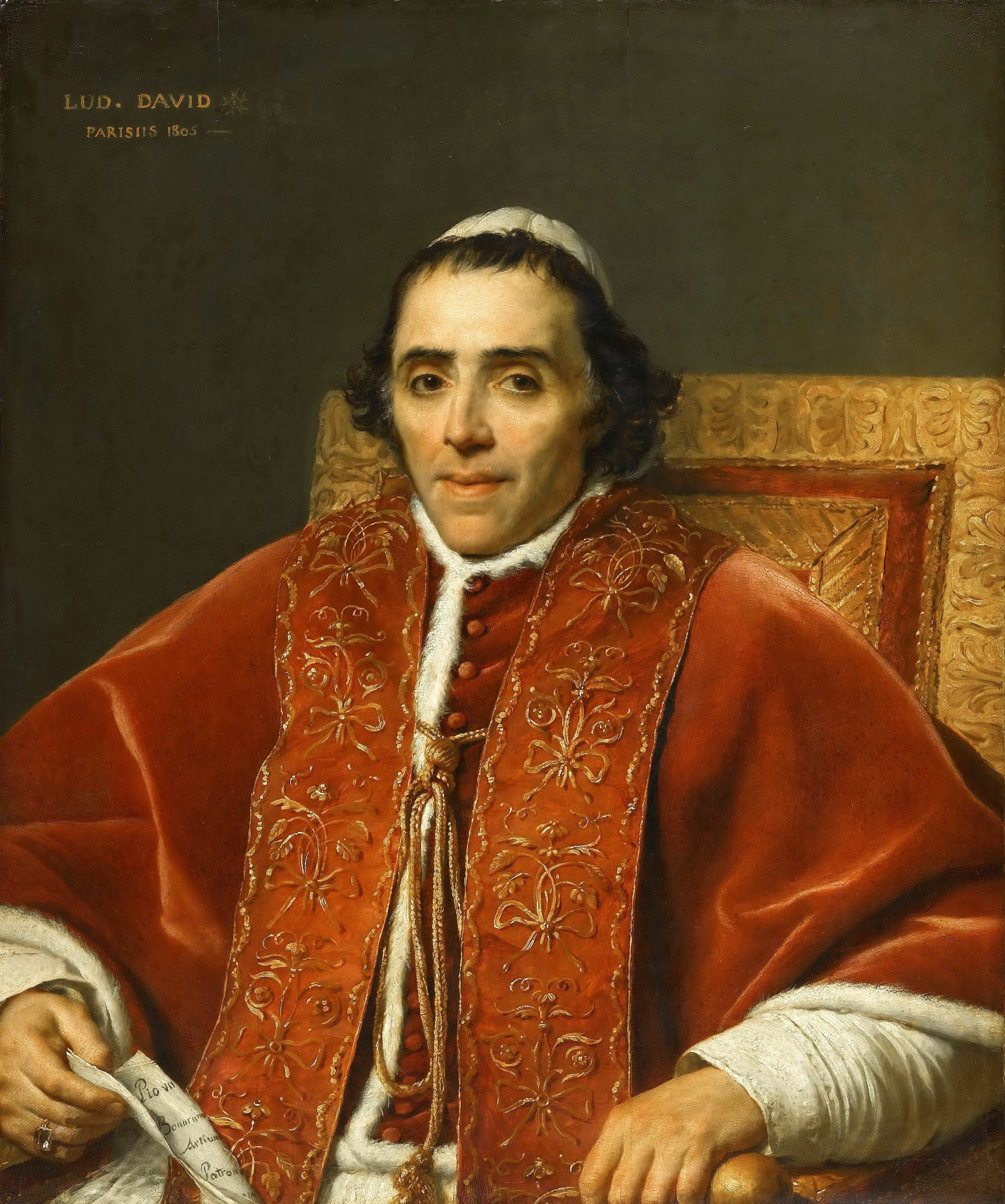

A papal conclave was held from 30 November 1799 to 14 March 1800 to elect a new pope to succeed Pius VI, who had died on 29 August. On the final ballot, the conclave elected Cardinal Barnaba Chiaramonti, the bishop of Imola. After accepting his election, he took the name Pius VII. This conclave was held in Venice and was the last to take place outside Rome. This period was marked by uncertainty for the Catholic Church and the papacy following the invasion of the Papal States and the abduction of Pius VI under the French Directory.

== Historical background ==
=== Reign of Pope Pius VI ===
Pius VI's reign had been marked by tension between his authority and that of the European monarchs and other institutions, both secular and ecclesiastical. This was largely due to his moderate liberal and reforming pretences. At the beginning of his pontificate he promised to continue the work of his predecessor, Clement XIV, in whose 1773 brief Dominus ac Redemptor the dissolution of the Society of Jesus was announced. Pro-Jesuit powers remained in support of Pius, thinking him secretly more inclined to the Society than Clement. The Archduchy of Austria proved a threat when its ruler, Emperor Joseph II, made internal reforms which conflicted with some of the power of the Papacy. Further, German archbishops had shown independence at the 1786 Congress of Ems, but were soon brought into line.

At the outbreak of the French Revolution Pius was compelled to see the independent Gallican Church suppressed, the pontifical and ecclesiastical possessions in France confiscated, and an effigy of himself burnt by the populace at the Palais Royal. The murder of the republican agent Hugo Basseville in the streets of Rome (January 1793) gave new ground of offence; the papal court was charged with complicity by the French Convention, and Pius threw in his lot with the First Coalition against the French First Republic.

=== State of the See ===
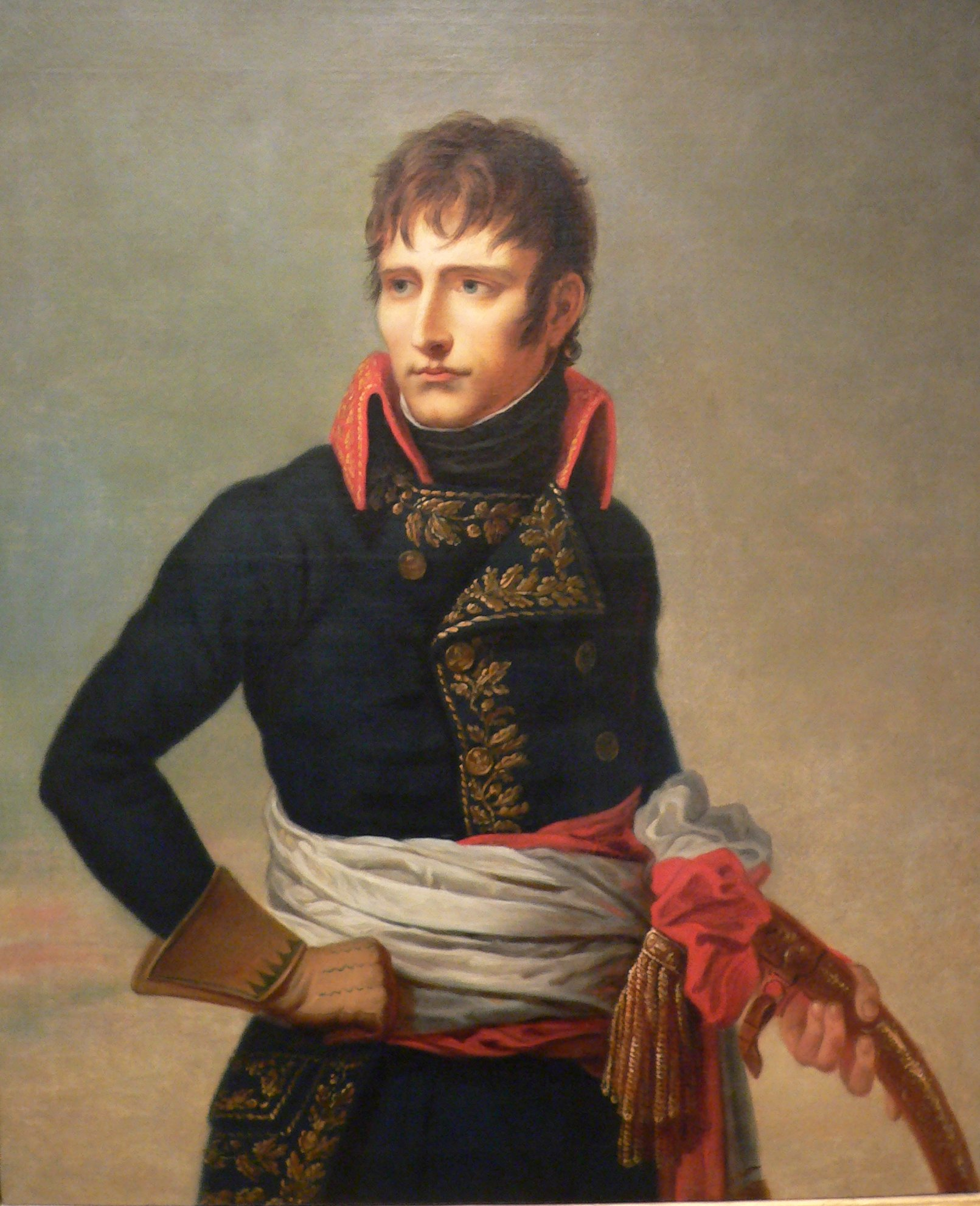
Napoleon Bonaparte c. 1800

In 1796 Napoléon Bonaparte invaded the Italian Peninsula, defeated the papal troops and occupied Ancona and Loreto. He did not continue and conquer Rome, as the French Directory ordered, being aware that this would not win favour among the French and Italian populations. Pius sued for peace, which was granted at Tolentino on 19 February 1797. The Treaty of Tolentino transferred Romagna to Bonaparte's newly formed Cispadane Republic (founded in December 1796 out of a merger of Reggio, Modena, Bologna and Ferrara) in a hope that the French would not further pursue the Papal lands. Several reforms were made in the French-controlled regions, where much property of the Church was confiscated.

On 28 December 1797, in a riot created by some Italian and French revolutionists, the French general Mathurin-Léonard Duphot of the French embassy was killed and a new pretext furnished for invasion.

Louis Alexandre Berthier marched to Rome, entered it unopposed on 13 February 1798, and, proclaiming a Roman Republic, demanded of the pope the renunciation of his temporal authority. His actions were at the direction of the French Government, at that time the Directory. Pius refused and was taken prisoner. On 20 February he was escorted from the Vatican to Siena, and thence to the Certosa near Florence. The French declaration of war against Grand Duke Ferdinand III of Tuscany led to the removal of Pius, by this time deathly ill, by way of Parma, Piacenza, Turin and Grenoble to the citadel of Valence, where he died six weeks later, on 29 August 1799. Napoleon was not directly involved. He was in the Near East, and did not return to France until November 1799, when he conducted the coup-d'état of 9 November (18 Brumaire).

== Beginning of the conclave ==
With the loss of the Vatican and the pope's other temporal power, the cardinals were left in a remarkable position. All had been expelled from the city of Rome by the French occupying authorities. They were forced to hold the conclave in Venice. This followed an ordinance issued by Pius VI in 1798, which established that when a conclave could not be held in Rome, it would be held in the city with the greatest number of cardinals.

The Benedictine San Giorgio Monastery in Venice was chosen as the location for the conclave, and the voting would be held in its night chapel. The city, along with other northern Italian lands, was held by the Archduchy of Austria, whose ruler Francis II, Holy Roman Emperor, agreed to defray the costs of the conclave. Since the secretary of the College of Cardinals was unable to leave Rome to attend, the cardinals elected, in an almost unanimous vote, Msgr. Ercole Consalvi as secretary in his place. Consalvi would prove an influential figure in the election.

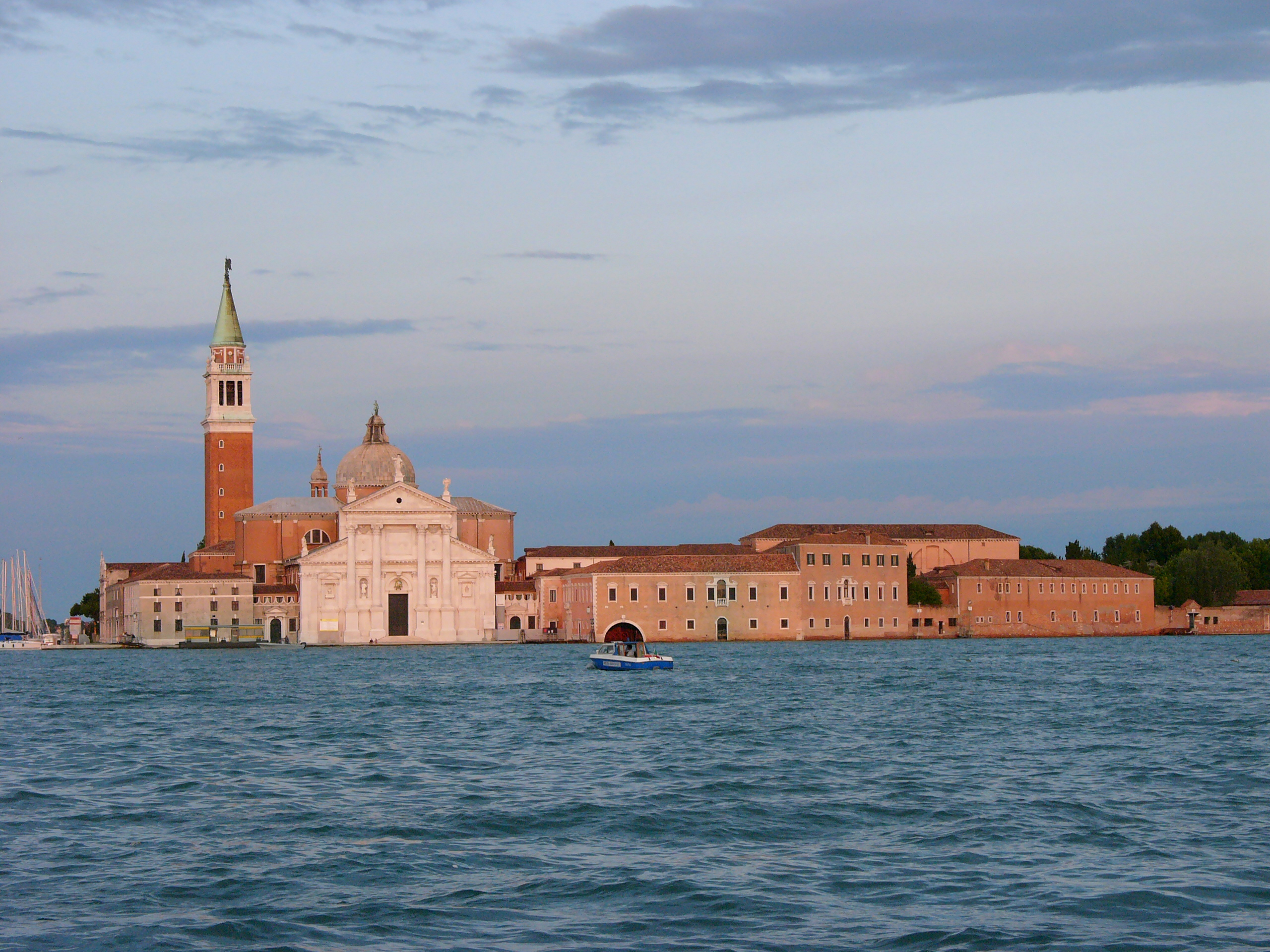
San Giorgio Monastery, Venice, the location of the conclave

The conclave began on 30 November 1799 and the assembled cardinals could not overcome a stalemate between Bellisomi and Mattei until March 1800. Thirty-four Cardinals were present at the start, with the late appearance in conclave on 10 December of Cardinal Franziskus Herzan von Harras, who was also the imperial plenipotentiary of Francis II. He bore the Imperial commands, the first of which was to get Cardinal Alessandro Mattei elected Pope. Strangely, by 28 December 1799 Cardinal Herzan had not yet presented his credentials as Imperial plenipotentiary to the College of Cardinals, and thus had no special status.

Cardinal Carlo Bellisomi, the bishop of Cesena, seemed a viable candidate (papabile), with some eighteen committed votes. His unpopularity among the Austrian faction, however, who preferred Cardinal Alessandro Mattei, the archbishop of Ferrara, subjected Bellisomi to the "virtual veto", since the Mattei faction had sufficient numbers to deny Bellisomi a canonically required two-thirds vote.

The conclave considered a third possible candidate, Cardinal Hyacinthe Sigismond Gerdil, CRSP, but Austria had rejected him from before the beginning of the conclave as too old—he was eighty-two. As the conclave was in the third month Cardinal Maury, who supported neither Bellisomi nor Mattei, suggested Barnaba Chiaramonti, OSB Cassin., the bishop of Imola.

In the middle of February, both Herzan and Maury independently calculated that Chiaramonti had about twelve supporters. On 11 March, a frank, private conversation took place between Cardinal Antonelli and Cardinal Herzan, in which each frankly admitted that the candidacies of Calcagni, Bellisomi, Gerdil, Mattei, and Valenti were failures. During the conversation Cardinal Dugnani appeared and suggested that Chiaramonti might be considered; numbers of supporters of Mattei were willing to go over to him. On 12 March the Spanish agent, Cardinal Francisco Lorenzana, received news from Madrid that he had permission to formally exclude Cardinal Mattei. It was unnecessary to do so, of course, since Bellisomi's supporters had already given him the virtual veto. On 14 March, with the support of the active and influential conclave secretary Consalvi, Cardinal Chiaramonti was elected.

Chiaramonti was, at the time, the bishop of Imola in the Subalpine Republic. He had stayed in place after the assumption of his diocese by Bonaparte's army in 1797 and famously made a speech in which he stated that good Christians could make good democrats, a speech described as "Jacobin" by Bonaparte himself. Though he could not save ecclesiastical reform and confiscation under the new rule, he did prevent the church being dissolved, unlike that in France.

Due to its temporary siting in Venice, the papal coronation was hurried. Having no papal treasures on hand, the noblewomen of the city manufactured the famous papier-mâché papal tiara. It was adorned with their own jewels. Chiaramonti was declared Pope Pius VII and crowned on 21 March at the monastery church of S. Giorgio.

== Election of Pope Pius VII ==
By the Battle of Marengo on 14 June 1800, the French regained Northern Italy from the forces of Austria. Following this promotion, Bonaparte decided to recognise the new pope and restored the Papal States to those borders set out at Tolentino.

The new pope headed for Rome, which he entered to the pleasure of the population on 3 July. Fearing further invasion he decreed the Papal States should remain neutral between Napoleonic Italy in the north and the Kingdom of Naples in the south. At the time the latter was ruled by Ferdinand IV, a member of the House of Bourbon.

Ercole Consalvi, the secretary of the conclave, was created a cardinal on 11 August 1800 and became the cardinal secretary of state. On 15 July 1801, France officially re-recognised Catholicism as its majority (not state) religion in the Concordat of 1801, and the Church was granted a measure of freedom with a Gallician constitution of the clergy. The Concordat further recognised the Papal States and that which it had confiscated and sold during the occupation of the area. In 1803, the reinstatement of the Papal States was made official by the Treaty of Lunéville.

Napoleon pursued secularisation of smaller, independent lands and, through diplomatic pressure, the dissolution of the Holy Roman Empire in 1806. The relationship between the Church and the First French Empire declined following the pope's refusal to divorce Jérôme Bonaparte and Elizabeth Patterson in 1805. The newly crowned emperor of the French restarted his expansionist policies and assumed control over Ancona, Naples (following the Battle of Austerlitz, installing his brother Joseph Bonaparte as its new king), Pontecorvo, and Benevento. These changes angered the pope, and, following his refusal to accept them, Napoleon, in February 1808, demanded he subsidise France's military conflict with the United Kingdom of Great Britain and Ireland. The pope again refused, leading to further confiscations of territory such as Urbino, Ancona, and Macerata. Finally, on 17 May 1809, the Papal States were formally annexed to the First French Empire, and Pius VII was taken to the Château de Fontainebleau.

== List of cardinal electors ==
=== List of participants ===
- Gian Francesco Albani, bishop of Ostia and Velletri
- Henry Benedict Stuart, bishop of Frascati, claimant to the thrones of Great Britain and Ireland
- Leonardo Antonelli, bishop of Palestrina
- Luigi Valenti-Gonzaga, bishop of Albano
- Francesco Carafa di Traetto
- Francesco Saverio de Zelada
- Guido Calcagnini, bishop of Osimo e Cingoli
- Bernardino Honorati, bishop of Senigallia
- Andrea Gioannetti, archbishop of Bologna
- Hyacinthe Sigismond Gerdil, CRSP
- Carlo della Martiniana, bishop of Vercelli
- Alessandro Mattei
- Franziskus Herzan von Harras, Bohemia
- Giovanni Andrea Archetti, Archbishop-bishop of Ascoli Piceno
- Giuseppe Maria Doria Pamphili
- Gregorio Chiaramonti, OSB, bishop of Imola (Elected Pope Pius VII)
- Carlo Bellisomi, bishop of Cesena
- Carlo Livizzani Forni
- Francisco Antonio de Lorenzana, archbishop of Toledo, Spain
- Ignazio Busca
- Stefano Borgia
- Giambattista Caprara
- Antonio Dugnani
- Ippolito Antonio Vincenti Mareri
- Jean-Sifrein Maury, France
- Giambattista Bussi de Pretis, bishop of Jesi
- Francesco Maria Pignatelli
- Aurelio Roverella
- Giulio Maria della Somaglia
- Antonio Doria Pamphili
- Romoaldo Braschi-Onesti
- Filippo Carandini
- Ludovico Flangini Giovanelli
- Fabrizio Dionigi Ruffo
- Giovanni Rinuccini

=== List of absentees ===
- Christoph Anton von Migazzi von Waal und Sonnenthurn, archbishop of Vienna, Austria
- Dominique de La Rochefoucauld, archbishop of Rouen, France
- Joannes-Henricus de Franckenberg, archbishop of Mechelen, Belgium
- Louis-René-Eduard de Rohan-Guéménée, archbishop of Strasbourg
- Giuseppe Maria Capece Zurlo Theat., archbishop of Naples
- Vincenzo Ranuzzi, bishop of Ancona e Umana
- Muzio Gallo
- José Francisco de Mendonça, patriarch of Lisbon, Portugal
- Antonino de Sentmenat y Cartellá, patriarch of the Western Indies, Spain
- Louis-Joseph de Laval-Montmorency

== Cardinal electors by country ==
The 35 attending cardinal electors were from the following countries:

Cardinal electors by country
Country	Continent	Number
Bohemia	Europe	1
France	Europe	1
Italy	Europe	30
Spain	Europe	2
Britain and Ireland (Note: Henry Benedict Stuart was the Jacobite claimant to the thrones of England, Scotland and Ireland.)	Europe	1
Total		35

== Bibliography ==
- "Sede Vacante 1799-1800". The Conclave of 1799-1800. Archived from the original on 21 February 2014.
- J. P. Adams, Sede Vacante 1799-1800, Documents concerning the Election of 1800, retrieved: 2017-12-31.
- "Pope Pius VII". The Popes Pius. Archived from the original on 12 March 2005.
- "Conclaves of the 19th Century (1799-1878)". The Cardinals of the Holy Roman Church.
- "Papal State and Papacy, 1799–1809". History of the Papal State.
- R. Obechea, El Cardinel Lorenzana en el conclave de Venezia (1975). (in Spanish)
- Alberto Lumbroso, Ricordi e documenti sul Conclave di Venezia (1800) (Roma: Fratelli Bocca 1903). (in Italian)
- Charles van Duerm, SJ, Un peu plus de lumière sur le Conclave de Venise et sur les commencements du Pontificat de Pie VII. 1799-1800 (Louvain: Ch. Peeters 1896). (in French)
- Eugenio Cipolletta, Memorie politiche sui conclavi da Pio VII a Pio IX (Milano 1863). (in Italian)
- Mémoires du Cardinal Consalvi (ed. J. Crétineau-Joly) seconde édition (Paris: Plon 1866), 217–288. (in French)
- Charles Antoine Ricard (editor), Correspondence diplomatique et mémoires inédits du Cardinal Maury (1792-1817) (Lille 1891) I, 264–379. (in French)
