= Cardinal de Talleyrand-Périgord =

Cardinal de Talleyrand-Périgord can refer to the following French cardinals:

- Hélie de Talleyrand-Périgord (cardinal) (1301-1364)
- Alexandre Angélique de Talleyrand-Périgord (1736-1821)
