= Jean-Sifrein Maury =

French cardinal (1746–1817)

His Eminence Jean-Sifrein Maury
- Archbishop of Paris
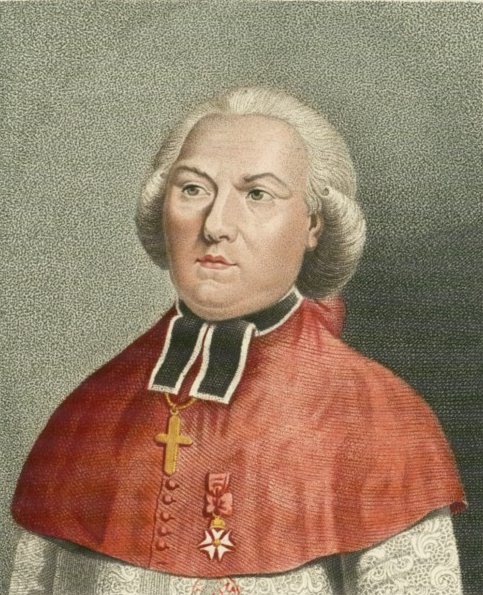
- Church: Catholic Church
- Archdiocese: Paris
- Appointed: 10 October 1810
- Term ended: 10 May 1817
- Predecessor: Jean-Baptiste de Belloy
- Successor: Alexandre Angélique de Talleyrand-Périgord
- Previous posts: Archbishop of Nicaea (1792-1794); Bishop of Montefiascone (1794-1816)

Orders
- Ordination: 1767 by Paul d'Albert
- Consecration: 1 May 1792 by Francesco Saverio de Zelada
- Created cardinal: 21 February 1794 by Pope Pius VI

Personal details
- Born: 26 June 1746 Valréas, Comtat Venaissin
- Died: 10 May 1817 (aged 70) Rome, Papal States

- Coat of arms

Jean-Sifrein Maury (French: [ʒɑ̃ sifʁɛ̃ moʁi]; 26 June 1746 – 10 May 1817) was a French cardinal, archbishop of Paris, and former bishop of Montefiascone.

== Biography ==
The son of a cobbler, he was born at Valréas in the Comtat-Venaissin, the enclave within France that belonged to the pope. He had three brothers.

His first steps in education took place at the school in Valréas, where he completed the course in humanities at the age of thirteen. He spent a year at the minor seminary (high school) of Sainte-Garde, and then transferred to the major seminary of St. Charles, which was run by the Sulpician fathers. His acuteness was observed by the priests of the seminary at Avignon, where he was educated. He received the subdiaconate at Meaux.

In 1765 he took up residence in Paris. He was ordained a priest at Sens by Cardinal Paul d'Albert de Luynes in 1767, having been granted a dispensation because he was below the canonical minimum age.

=== Early efforts in eloquence ===
He tried his fortune by writing éloges of famous persons, then a favorite practice, beginning with King Stanislaus of Poland in 1766 and Charles V in 1767. On 25 August 1771, the Académie française awarded his Éloge on Fénelon the second prize, second only to that by La Harpe. Fénelon's grand-nephew, Leo François Ferdinand Salignac de La Mothe-Fénelon, who was bishop of Lombez (1771–1788), was so impressed by Maury's laudation of his relative that he granted him a canonry in his cathedral and named him a Vicar General.

The real foundation of his fortunes was the success of a panegyric on Saint Louis, delivered in the chapel of the Louvre on 25 August 1772, before the Académie française, who caused him to be recommended to Cardinal Charles Antoine de La Roche-Aymon, the prelate responsible for the dispensation of royal benefices as Grand Almoner of France. Maury was granted the Abbey of La Frénade in the diocese of Saintes in commendam. The Cardinal also appointed him to preach before the King on Holy Thursday 1773, during Advent 1773, and at Versailles during Lent 1775.

In 1777 he published under the title of Discours choisis his panegyrics on Saint Louis, Saint Augustine and Fénelon, his remarks on Bossuet and his Essai sur l'éloquence de la chaire, a volume which contains much good criticism, and remained a French classic through the nineteenth century, as long as elegant rhetoric was valued in the pulpit. The book was often reprinted as Principes de l'éloquence. He became a favorite preacher in Paris, and was Lent preacher at court in 1781, when King Louis XVI said of his sermon: "If the abbé had said only a few words on religion, he would have discussed every possible subject."

In 1786, he obtained the rich priory of Saint Pierre, to which belonged the Seigneurie de Lihons-en-Santerre (Lyons), near Péronne;

=== Politician in the revolution ===
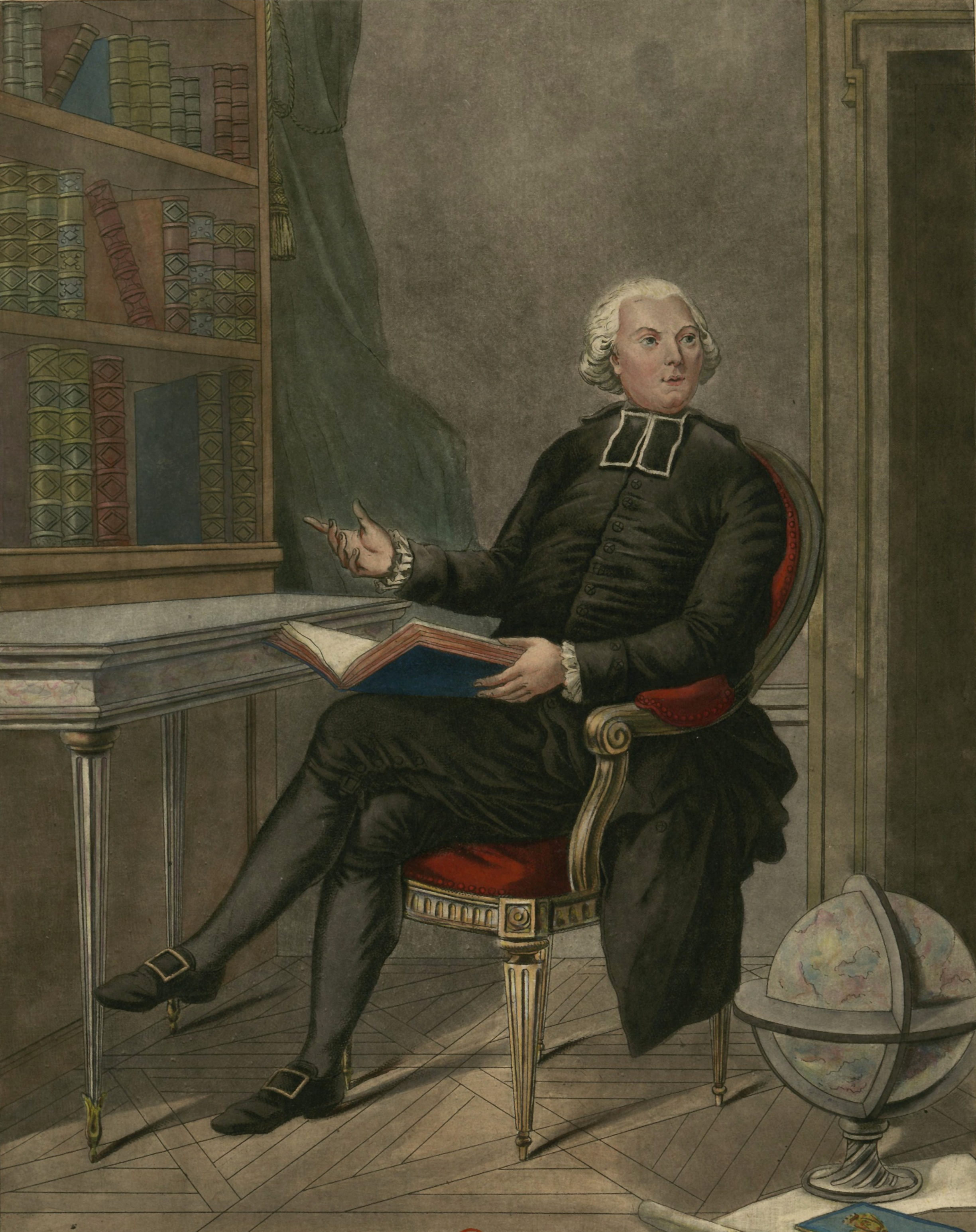
Maury, Predicateur du Roi de France, 1789.

In 1785 Abbé Maury was elected to the Académie française, successor to the chair formerly occupied by Lefranc de Pompignan. His morals were as loose as those of his great rival Mirabeau, but he was famed in Paris for his wit and gaiety.

He was elected a member of the Estates-General of 1789 by the clergy of the bailliage of Péronne, proving from the first to be the most able and persevering defender of the ancien régime. (He had, nonetheless, drawn up the greater part of the cahier of the clergy of Péronne which contained a considerable programme of reform.) It is said that he attempted to emigrate both in July and in October 1789, having been placed on a list of proscriptions by the Orléanist faction, but after that time, deserted by nearly all his friends, he decided to remain in France.

In the National Constituent Assembly he took an active part in every important debate, combating with especial vigour the alienation of the property of the clergy. He often got the better of his principal antagonist, Mirabeau, but he did not win a single vote.

Maury's eloquence could not exactly be described as studied; yet it was the outcome of a well-stored mind, long trained in oratory; and hence, his speeches read far better than his rival's, whose rugged genius poured forth its torrents regardless of the rules of rhetoric. Mirabeau triumphed, because he was the man of the hour, giving voice to the unavenged wrongs and pent-up passions of millions. Maury fell back, step by step, with his face to the foe, making the conquerors pay dearly for their victory.

On 2 November 1789, Catholic Church property that was held for purposes of church revenue was nationalized. On 13 February 1790, monastic vows were forbidden and all ecclesiastical orders and congregations were dissolved. On 12 July 1790 the Civil Constitution of the Clergy became law, provoking a schism between France and the Catholic Church, and the breaking off of diplomatic relations between Rome and Paris. His life was often in danger, and he received a letter from Louis XVI on 3 February 1791, recommending greater circumspection and prudence. But his ready wit always saved him, and it was said that one bon mot would preserve him for a month. He finally decided, however, that it was too dangerous for him to remain in France, and in October 1791 he fled to Bruxelles, then Coblenz, and finally Rome.

When he did emigrate, he found himself regarded as a martyr to the church and the king. On 17 April 1792 Pope Pius VI appointed Maury to be his Nuncio in Frankfort, where the imperial diet intended to elect Francis II of Austria as Holy Roman Emperor. He appointed him Archbishop of Nicaea in partibus (Turkey) on 24 April 1792. He was consecrated in Rome in the Vatican Basilica at the altar of the Chair of Saint Peter on 1 May 1792 by Cardinal Francesco Saverio de Zelada.

=== Cardinal ===
On 21 February 1794, Maury was named a cardinal by Pope Pius VI, and on 12 September was assigned the titular church of Santissima Trinità dei Monti in Rome. On the day he was named cardinal, he was also made bishop of Montefiascone in Italy. There he settled down, conducted a thorough diocesan visitation, and wrote a detailed report of the status of the diocese for the Sacred Congregation of the Council in Rome (15 November 1796). He held a diocesan synod for the clergy, and made judicious use of the exiled French clergy, improving the teaching at the diocesan seminary by appointing two doctors of the Sorbonne. In 1798, however, the French drove him from his diocese and from the Papal States, and all of his property and benefices were confiscated by order of General Berthier on 12 February 1798. Pope Pius VI, already a captive, through one of his chamberlains ordered Maury to flee. He attempted to seek refuge in Florence, but the Duke was under French pressure to expel him. He did, however, provide Maury with a disguise and a place on a mission he was sending to Venice, where Maury finally settled, under the protection of the Austrians who had taken Venice from Napoleon – who had destroyed the Serene Republic. He arrived in Venice on 17 April 1798.

=== Conclave in Venice ===
Pope Pius VI died in the prison fortress of Valence on 29 August 1799. Before being deported to France he had signed and sealed several bulls which allowed the Cardinals to hold a conclave elsewhere than in Rome, if Rome were occupied by enemies, and dispensing them from the observance of the usual rules and regulations governing a conclave, as had been embodied in various papal bulls since the thirteenth century. There were no cardinals left in Rome or the Papal States, and those who had fled to Naples were driven out when a popular uprising created the Parthenopean Republic. The only friendly territory appeared to be Austrian, and the cardinals gradually headed for Venice. Maury, who was in Venice, had already been commissioned by Louis XVIII to work for the assembling of a conclave. In a letter to Louis on 12 October, Maury noted that there were twenty-three cardinals assembled in Venice. On 2 November 1799, there were thirty-three cardinals in Venice, and ultimately thirty-five took part, once the Austrian Herzan and the Spaniard Lorenzana arrived. The opening ceremonies took place on 30 November 1799.

Maury was the only one of the five French cardinals at the conclave in Venice. He was not himself a viable candidate. He had no party of supporters, and he was generally looked askance at because he was French. The Austrian government named him as one of the cardinals who was absolutely unacceptable as pope. They preferred Cardinal Alessandro Mattei of Florence (a native Roman), who had signed the Treaty of Tolentino with Napoleon on behalf of Pope Pius VI, since it acknowledged Austria's possession of the three Italian legations of the Papal States. Others, led by Cardinal Albani, the Dean of the College of Cardinals, and including Maury, preferred Cardinal Carlo Bellisomi, Bishop of Cesena, a diplomat with experience in Cologne and Portugal. Each of these candidates had enough committed votes to prevent the other from reaching the required 2/3 of the electors, and therefore they excluded each other. Finally, after three months and fourteen days, and with some hard work by Maury and others behind the scenes, the cardinals chose the Benedictine Bishop of Imola, Gregorio Barnaba Chiaramonti, an accommodating person with no strong positions.

Maury accompanied the new Pope Pius on his journey to Rome from Venice, and then traveled himself to Montefiascone. On 21 April 1800, the exiled Louis XVIII wrote to Maury, thanking him for his services at the conclave just concluded, and enclosing the documents which named Maury as his Minister before the Holy See. Thereafter Maury made regular trips to Rome, on behalf of the affairs of Louis XVIII, but also to report to Pius about his correspondence and information gathering about the French bishops who had refused the oath to the Civil Constitution of the Clergy and gone into exile. But the papal government, led by Cardinal Ercole Consalvi, was preparing to come to terms with Napoleon. In the autumn of 1800, Pius VII sent Archbishop Giuseppe Spina to Vercelli for conversations with the First Consul. Before he set out, Maury held several conversations with him, attempting to get Spina to come over to the side of the Bourbons. Spina was noncommittal, but Maury failed. When negotiations began in Paris which led to the Concordat of 1801, the French government insisted that Maury not be consulted or informed, and indeed that he should be kept out of Rome entirely. When the Concordat was signed, Louis XVIII was livid, believing that he had been betrayed by people in Rome whom he had believed to be his friends and supporters, including the Pope and Maury.

=== Bonapartist ===
In 1804, having discovered the direction of papal policy and feeling the estrangement with Louis XVIII, Cardinal Maury began to prepare his return to France by a well-turned letter to Napoleon, congratulating him on restoring religion to France once more. On 18 May Napoleon was declared Emperor of the French, and in December Pius VII participated in his coronation in Notre Dame in Paris. In 1806 he did return and in 1807 was again received into the Académie française.

The Archbishop of Paris, Cardinal Jean-Baptiste de Belloy died on 10 June 1808. By imperial decree, Napoleon I, Emperor of the French nominated his uncle, Cardinal Joseph Fesch, to the See of Paris This was his right, in accordance with the Concordat of 1801, Article 5, but Fesch was quite aware that Pius VII, who was Napoleon's prisoner, was refusing to provide bulls of institution for any bishops nominated by Bonaparte. On the refusal of Cardinal Fesch, on 10 October 1810 Napoleon nominated Maury. He also suggested to the Chapter of the cathedral of Paris that they elect him Administrator capitular of the diocese. The suggestion was immediately obeyed, by the majority of the Canons. Maury never called himself Archbishop of Paris, only archbishop-designate and Capitular Administrator of the diocese during the Sede vacante. On 5 November 1810, he was ordered by the pope to cease his activities in the diocese of Paris, and threatened him with ecclesiastical censures if he persisted, but Maury refused, claiming that the papal letter was a forgery. Napoleon tried unsuccessfully to break this impasse by calling a church council in Paris.

On 9 April 1814, the Chapter of Notre Dame met and revoked the powers which they had bestowed on Cardinal Maury in 1810. On 3 May 1814, therefore, in the motu proprio "Gravissimis de Causis", Pope Pius VII suspended him from all episcopal functions in the dioceses of Montefiascone and Corneto. On the Bourbon restoration toward the end of 1814, he was summarily expelled from the French Academy and from the archiepiscopal palace in Paris. He was ordered to leave France by the Comte d'Artois, Lieutenant-General of the Realm.

Maury retired to Rome. On the news of Napoleon's escape from Elba, Pius VII fled from the city, leaving the pro-Secretary of State, Cardinal Bartolomeo Pacca in charge. Pacca took advantage of the moment and ordered Maury imprisoned in the Castel Sant'Angelo, on 12 May 1815, for his disobedience to the papal orders. He was held for three months and fourteen days, until Consalvi returned from Vienna and ordered him released. He was allowed to take up residence in the novice house of the Lazarist fathers at San Silvestro al Quirinale.

Louis XVIII dealt another blow to Cardinal Maury's prestige and amour propre. On 28 March 1816, he issued a royal ordonnance, restoring the pre-revolutionary titles and structure of France's academies, and adding lists of members. Maury's name was deliberately left off the list of members of the Académie française.

Maury died on 10 May 1817, primarily from a disease contracted in prison, thought to have been scurvy.

=== Legacy ===
According to the Encyclopædia Britannica Eleventh Edition:

As a politician, his wit and eloquence made him a worthy rival of Mirabeau. He sacrificed much to personal ambition, yet remained publicly unremembered by Louis XVIII as a courageous supporter of Louis XVI and by the papacy as the one defender of the Church during the States-General. As a critic, he was and is considered a very able writer. Sainte-Beuve gives him the credit of discovering Father Jacques Bridayne and of giving Bossuet his rightful place as a preacher above Massillon.

== Bibliography ==
- 1766 - Eloge de très-haute, très-puissant et très-exellen prince Stanislas le Bienfaisant, roi de l'Pologne, duc de Lorraine et de Bar. A Paris, chez Antoine Desventes de la Doué
- 1767 - Éloge de Charles V, roi de France, surnommé le sage. A Paris; chez la veuve Duchsne
- 1771 - Eloge de François de Salignac de La Motte-Fénelon, archevéque-duc de Cambray, précepteur des enfants de France. Paris, Chez la veuve Regnard & Demonville
- 1772 - Panégyrique de Saint Louis. Roi de France. A Paris: Chez Le Jay
- 1790 - Opinion de M. l'abbé Maury, député de Picardie, sur la Constitution civile du Clergé
- 1791 - Esprit, pensées et maximes de m. l'abbé Maury, député a l'Assemblée Nationale. A Paris, chez Cuchet
- 1791 Opinion de M. l'abbé Maury, député de Picardie, sur l'hotel des Invalides. A Paris, Au Bureau de l'Ami du Roi
- 1794 - Lettre pastorale de son eminence monseigneur le cardinal Maury
- 1814 - Naauwkeurig verhaal der vervoering van Paus Pius VII, op last van Buonaparte, der oorzaken van deze vervoering, der mishandelingen en vervolgingen, welke Zijne Heiligheid zoo wel op zijne reize naar, als gedurende zijn verblijf in Frankrijk geleden heeft, en zijner wederkomst in zijne staten. Met eenen brief van Z.H. aan den kardinaal Maury. Te Deventer, bij J.W. Robijns
- 1828 - Essai sur l'éloquence de la chaire, panégyriques, éloges et discours. Tome premier; Tome second; Tome troisieme. La Haye, chez J.-W. ten Hagen
- 1891 - Correspondance diplomatique et mémoires inédits du cardinal Maury (1792-1817). (Tome premier); Tome second. Lille: Desclée, De Brouwer & cie

== Sources ==
- Maury, Jean-Sifrein (1827). Ricard, A. (ed.). Oeuvres choisies du Cardinal Jean-Sifrein Maury...: précédées d'une notice sur sa vie et ses ouvrages... (in French). Vol. Tome premier. Paris: Aucher-Leroy. Maury, Jean-Sifrein (1827). Tome deuxième. Maury, Jean-Sifrein (1827). Tome troisième. Maury, Jean-Sifrein (1827). Tome quatrième. Maury, Jean-Sifrein (1827). Tome cinquième.
- Ricard, Antoine (1891). Correspondance diplomatique et mémoires inédits du cardinal Maury (1792-1817): L'élection du dernier roi des Romains. Les affaires de France. Le conclave de Venise. Le concordat de 1801. Le sacre. L'empire. La restauration (in French). Vol. Tome premier. Lille: Desclée, De Brouwer & cie. Maury, Jean Siffrein (1891). Tome second.
- Maury, Louis Sifrein (1828). Vie du cardinal Jean Sifrein Maury: avec des notes et des pièces justificatives (in French). Paris: Gayet.
- Poujoulat, Jean-Joseph-François (1859). Le Cardinal Maury: sa vie et ses oeuvres (in French) (deuxieme ed.). Paris: C. Douniol.
- Sainte-Beuve, Charles-Augustin (1853). Causeries du Lundi (in French). Vol. Tome quatrième (seconde ed.). Paris: Garnier Frères. pp. 199–217.
- Ricard, Antoine (1887). L'abbé Maury (1746-1791) : L'Abbé Maury avant 1789, L'Abbé Maury et Mirabeau (in French). Paris: E. Plon, Nourrit et cie.
- Bonet-Maury, Gaston (1892). Le Cardinal Maury d'après ses mémoires et sa correspondance inédits. Paris: Administration des deux revues.
- Aulard, François-Alphonse (1905). Les orateurs de la révolution: L'Assemblée constituante (in French) (nouvelle ed.). Paris: E. Cornély et cie.
- Libels written against Maury during the Revolution, claimed by Jacques René Hébert but sometimes attributed to Rétif de la Bretonne:

Hébert, Jacques-René (1790). Vie privée de l'abbé Maury, écrite sur des mémoires fournis par lui-même, pour joindre à son Petit Carême... [par J. R. Hébert] (in French). Paris: De l'Imprimerie de J. Grand.

- Querard, Joseph Marie (1833). La france litteraire, ou dictionnaire bibliographique des savants, historiens, et gens de lettres (in French). Vol. Tome cinquième. Paris: Firmin Didot freres. pp. 648–651.
- Beik, Paul H. "Abbé Maury and the National Assembly." Proceedings of the American Philosophical Society 95, no. 5 (1951): 546–55.

Catholic Church titles
Preceded by Jean Baptiste de Belloy-Morangle	Archbishop of Paris; 1810–1817	Succeeded by Alexandre-Angélique Talleyrand de Périgord
