= Jacques Bridaine =

Jacques Bridaine (21 March 1701 – 22 December 1767) was a French Roman Catholic preacher.

== Biography ==
Jacques Bridaine was born on 21 March 1701 in Chusclan. Having completed his studies at the Jesuit college of Avignon, Bridaine entered the Sulpician Seminary of the Royal Missions of St. Charles of the Cross.

When only in minor orders, he was assigned as Lenten preacher in the church of Aigues-Mortes. Soon after his ordination to the priesthood in 1725, he joined the Missions Royales, organized to bring back to the Catholíc faith the Protestants of France. For over forty years he visited as a missionary preacher almost every town of central and southern France.

It was at Aigues-Mortes where his extreme youth provoked the derision of the people and when Ash Wednesday arrived, the church was empty. Undismayed, he put on his surplice and went out in the principal streets, ringing a bell, and inviting the people to hear him. He succeeded in filling the church with congregants who came out of curiosity but when he began in a most unusual fashion by singing a canticle about death the congregation burst out in loud laughter; whereupon he denounced the congregation.

Pope Benedict XIV (1740–1758) gave him permission, during his Jubilee visit to Rome in 1750, to preach anywhere in Christendom.

In the course of his life, Bridaine preached two hundred and fifty-six missions, traveling to almost every town of France in the performance of his work. His notable missions included:

- Marseille (in 1732)
- Montpellier
- Lyon
- Chaillot (in 1744)
- Chalon-sur-Saône (in 1745)
- Saint-Sulpice (in 1753)

Bridaine, who tended to extemporize rather than write his sermons in advance, quickly became famous for his theatrical preaching and sonorous, penetrating voice. His self-described "methods" for capturing the attention of an audience included processions, choruses, and banners, as well as props like candles, nooses, and skulls. Madame Necker describes a typical stunt, in which Bridaine ended a sermon by telling a great procession "I am now going to bring you home," and then led them to a graveyard. Bridaine was known for his vivid and often grotesque imagery, impressing his audience with vivid descriptions of death and hell.

Cardinal Maury included a sermon in his Principes de l'Éloquence which he attributed to Bridaine at the 1753 mission in St. Sulpice. This sermon won Bridaine great praise, and Longfellow references it in the poem "The Old Clock on the Stairs." Later, however, Maury would admit that he had written it himself, inspired by a secondhand description of Bridaine's preaching. Nevertheless, Bridaine's preaching did cause great excitement and draw enormous crowds. His mission in Chalon-sur-Saône drew 100,000 francs in donations.

Medals were struck in Bridaine's honor, and the most distinguished prelates showed him the greatest reverence and affection. Massillon was supposedly so impressed by Bridaine's oratorical skills that he refused to preach in Bridaine's presence. The Protestants of France are said to have been particularly friendly to him, because of the many good offices he performed in their regard. For fourteen years he followed the spiritual guidance of a missionary like himself named Mahistre. In 1742 Cardinal Fleury proposed to establish a missionary congregation for all France under the direction of Bridaine, but the death of the cardinal caused the project to fall through.

In the course of his missions, Bridaine established what he called "peace tribunals" (Bureau de Paix), courts composed of some of his associate missionaries, a number of irreproachable laymen, and the parish priest. To these courts all disputes were submitted and the decisions were accepted as final.

Bridaine's Cantiques Spirituels passed through forty-seven editions, in use in most French churches. He has also left five volumes of sermons (ed. Avignon, 1823; Paris, 1861).

Bridaine died in Roquemaure on 22 December 1767, after a failed operation to treat kidney stones. The Abbé Carron wrote his biography, first published in 1831. In 1882, a monument was built for Bridaine in his hometown of Chusclan.
