= Imperial Catechism =

The Imperial Catechism (French: Catéchisme impérial) was established in 1806 by Napoleon I to replace the diocesan catechisms throughout the Empire.

Derived primarily from the Gallican catechisms of Bossuet and Fleury, it included a controversial section on the duties owed to the Emperor, added at Napoleon's request. This addition rendered it incompatible with the universal doctrine of the Catholic Church.

== History ==
The Organic Articles promulgated in 1802 alongside the Concordat of 1801 mandated a single catechism "for all the Catholic churches of France". Previously, dioceses had their own catechisms.

In 1803, the drafting of the Imperial Catechism began under the direction of Abbé Paul d'Astros (chief of staff and nephew of the Minister of Worship Portalis), assisted by Abbé Emery and several members of the Society of Saint-Sulpice. Their work, which involved revising the Gallican catechisms of Bossuet and Fleury, was completed in September 1803. Theological reviews continued until 1804.

Publication was delayed by Bonaparte, then First Consul, who wanted additional sections on the Fourth Commandment. These sections addressed the duties of citizens toward the government and civil authority. The commission led by Abbé d'Astros objected, noting that obedience to the French government was not a universal dogma. In 1803, Portalis asked Bishop Bernier to draft these additions, but Bonaparte rejected them. In 1805, Napoleon revisited the issue, and Bernier produced a new draft, which was revised with Portalis and Cardinal Caprara.

While the Holy See demanded in August 1805 that the cardinal congregation be kept informed, Cardinal Caprara, Papal legate, approved the Imperial Catechism in its entirety on March 30, 1806, without consulting Pope Pius VII. The catechism was made mandatory throughout the Empire by a decree on April 4, 1806, and published on May 5.

Despite its "abundance of maxims not belonging to Catholic doctrine", only the Archbishop of Bordeaux, d'Aviau, among the French clergy, openly denounced the catechism. In Belgium, it faced strong opposition from the lower clergy, and the bishops of Tournai and Liège refused to publish it. Although Rome remained silent, Pius VII's reservations contributed to the eventual rupture between the Pope and Napoleon two years later.

== Content ==
The Imperial Catechism was a single catechism taught throughout the Empire. It emphasized duties such as "love, respect, military service, taxes, obedience, and loyalty to the Emperor". The glorification of Napoleon I and his regime was interwoven with universal Catholic doctrine.

== Bibliography ==
- André Latreille (1935). Le catéchisme impérial de 1806: études et documents pour servir à l'histoire des rapports de Napoléon et du clergé concordataire. Les Belles Lettres.
- André Fugier (1938). "Latreille (André), Le catéchisme impérial de 1806. Etudes et documents pour servir à l'histoire des rapports de Napoléon et du clergé concordataire, 1935". Revue d'Histoire Moderne & Contemporaine. 13 (31): 83–85.
- Jean-Luc Chartier (2004). Portalis: Père du Code civil. Fayard. ISBN 2-213-61795-3.
