= Filippo Maria Visconti (bishop) =

Archbishop of Milan

His Excellency Filippo Maria Visconti
- Archbishop of Milan
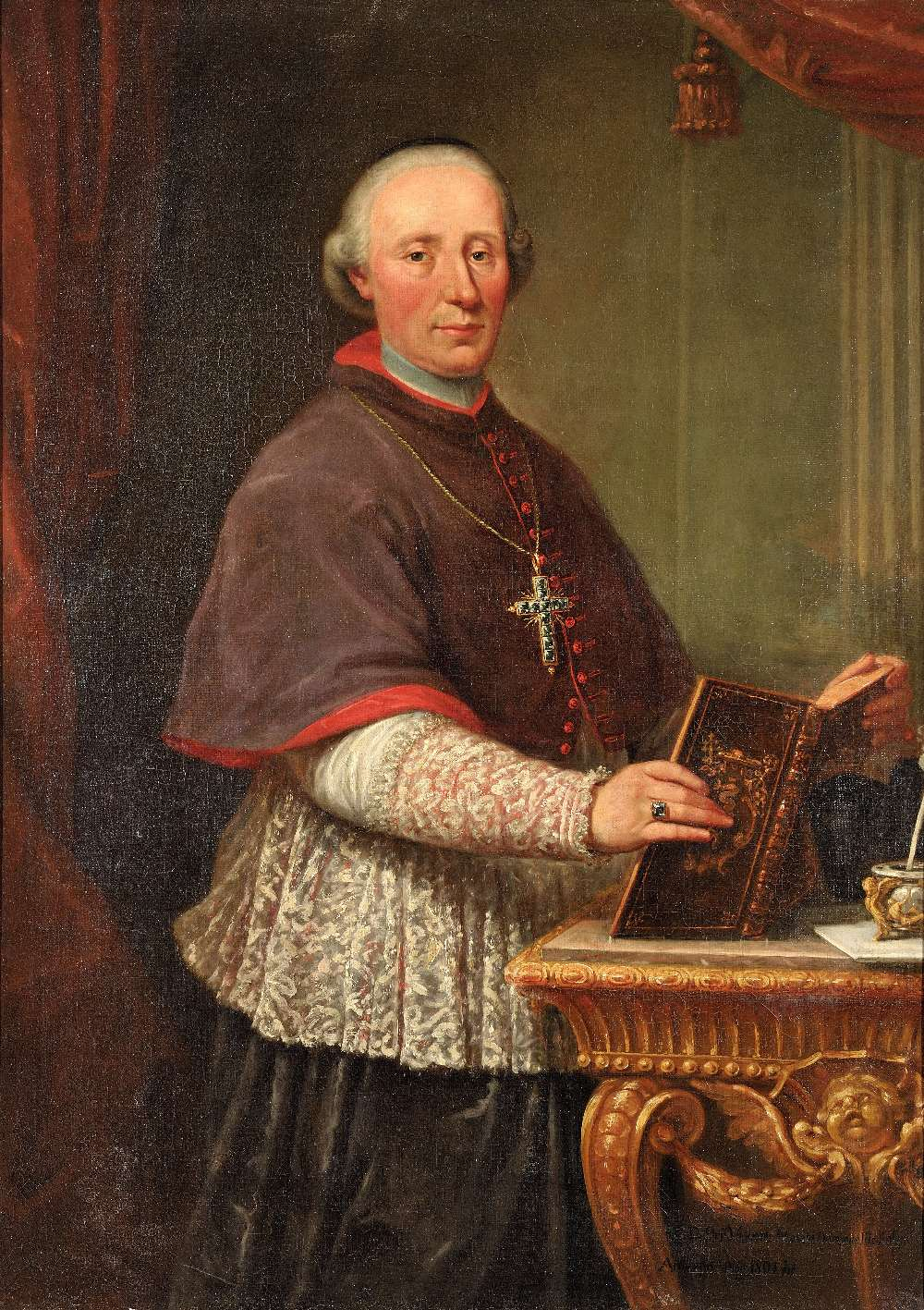
- Church: Catholic Church
- See: Milan
- Appointed: 25 June 1784
- Term ended: 30 December 1801
- Predecessor: Giuseppe Pozzobonelli
- Successor: Giovanni Battista Caprara

Orders
- Ordination: 31 May 1749 (Priest)
- Consecration: 27 June 1784 (Bishop) by Antonio Eugenio Visconti

Personal details
- Born: 19 August 1721 Massino Visconti
- Died: 30 December 1801 (aged 80) Lyon
- Buried: Cathedral of Milan
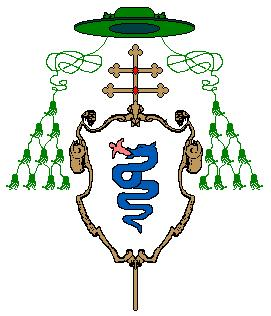
- Coat of arms

Filippo Maria Visconti (1721–1801) was the Archbishop of Milan from 1784 to 1801.

== Early life ==
Filippo Maria Visconti was born on 19 August 1721 in Massino Visconti, a village near Lake Maggiore which was the original land tenure of the House of Visconti, a main noble family of the Duchy of Milan and to which Filippo Maria belonged. Filippo Maria earned a doctorate in Theology, and was ordained priest on 31 May 1749. He served as diocesan priest in Milan, first as canon of the Basilica of San Lorenzo, and later as canon of the major chapter of the Cathedral of Milan, of which in 1783 he was elected provost. In force of this office he temporarily administered the diocese of Milan after the death of the Archbishop Giuseppe Pozzobonelli in April 1783.

== Archbishop of Milan ==
The Duchy of Milan was part of the Habsburg lands, which since 1780 were governed by Joseph II. Joseph II, himself a man of the Enlightenment, planned and undertook vigorous and unpopular reforms of the Church in order to make the Catholic Church in his empire the tool of the state, independent of the papacy.

Accordingly, at the death of Archbishop Giuseppe Pozzobonelli, Joseph II decided to break with the century-old tradition and to choose directly the new archbishop. On 1 September 1783, he appointed as new Archbishop of Milan the temporary administrator of the diocese, Filippo Maria Visconti. The pope initially rejected such dictation, but unable to assert his authority, on 25 June 1784 formally appointed Visconti. Visconti was consecrated bishop on 27 June 1784, in Rome by the hands of Cardinal Antonio Eugenio Visconti, and when in Milan, he swore allegiance to Joseph II. Filippo Maria Visconti was never created Cardinal.

Visconti, who was of pleaser and feeble nature, was not able to oppose to the commands of the religious reforms of Joseph II: in particular he accepted the expropriation of the Valsolda's tenure and of the Collegio Elvetico which belonged to the Diocese of Milan, the closing of the historical seminaries founded by Saint Charles Borromeo with the opening of a single seminary in Pavia under the control of the government and near to Jansenism positions, the reduction of the parishes (25 December 1787) of the monasteries and of the confraternities, the new law on the marriages which moved them under the State's law and the broad reduction of jurisdiction of the ecclesiastic tribunals.

With the death of Joseph II in 1790, the situation of the Church in Milan slowly improved, the seminaries were re-established, and Visconti re-published the Ambrosian Missal and issue a new text of Christian Doctrine.

In 1793, he ordered to the clergy to sell even valuable religious objects in order to support the War of the First Coalition against Napoleon. However, Napoleon defeated the Austrians and on 15 May 1796 entered in Milan, founding the Transpadane Republic and commandeering ecclesiastic properties. The population reacted with riots, particularly in Binasco and Pavia, and Visconti, to please the new ruler, tried to calm the turmoils and ordered prayers in all churches in favour of the army of the French First Republic. However the situation of the Milanese church got worse and worse due to the open anticlerical orderings of the just created Cisalpine Republic, such as the exclusion of the bishop from the appointments of the parish priests, the prohibition of processions in the streets, the covering of religious images on the wall of the houses, the disband of most chapters and of many religious orders.

A brief break occurred between 1799 and 1800, when the Austrians returned in Milan for a few months: Visconti openly rejoiced for the change of rulers who revoked some of the anticlerical measures. However Napoleon re-entered in Milan on 2 June 1800 and Visconti escaped temporally to Padua. Returned in Milan in November 1800, he made himself available to the Cisalpine Republic, which restored its repressive rules against the Church and against the religious sentiment of the population.

In November 1801, Visconti was invited by Tayllerand in Lyon to participate to the founding of the Napoleonic Italian Republic. On 30 December 1801, Filippo Maria Visconti died there while sitting to a formal banquet, and his remains were translated to Milan and buried in the North nave of the Cathedral of Milan.
