= Anne-Antoine-Jules de Clermont-Tonnerre =

French prelate

His Eminence Anne-Antoine-Jules de Clermont-Tonnerre
- Archbishop of Toulouse
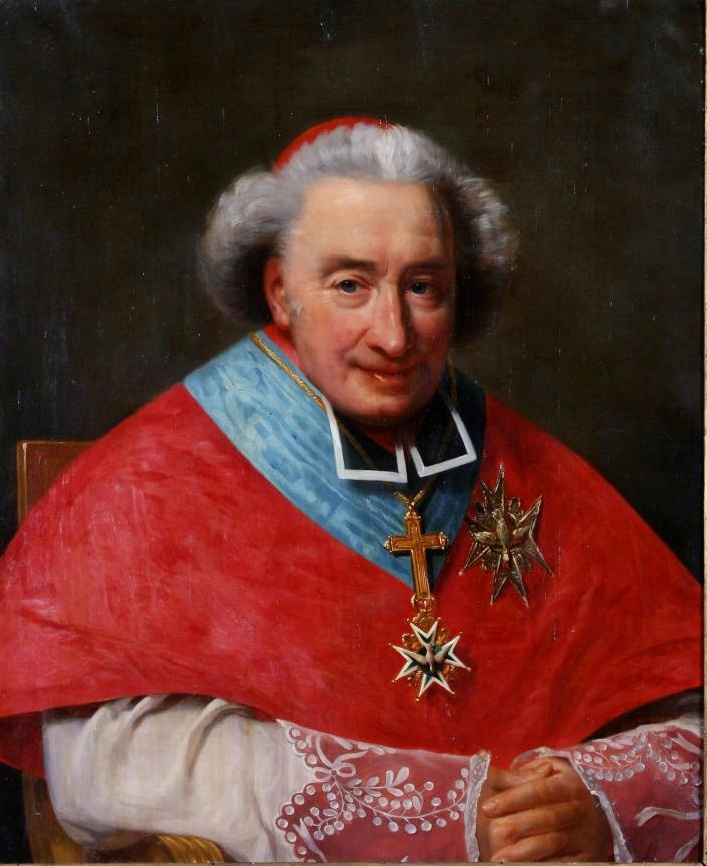
- Portrait circa 1830.
- Church: Roman Catholic Church
- Archdiocese: Toulouse
- See: Toulouse
- Appointed: 28 August 1820
- Term ended: 21 February 1830
- Predecessor: François de Bovet
- Successor: Paul-Thérèse-David d'Astros
- Other post: Cardinal-Priest of Santissima Trinità al Monte Pincio (1823-30)
- Previous post: Bishop of Chalons-sur-Marne (1782-1801)

Orders
- Consecration: 14 April 1782 by Alexandre-Angélique Talleyrand de Périgord
- Created cardinal: 2 December 1822 by Pope Pius VII
- Rank: Cardinal-Priest

Personal details
- Born: Anne-Antoine-Jules de Clermont-Tonnerre; 1 January 1749 Paris, Kingdom of France
- Died: 21 February 1830 (aged 81) Toulouse, French Kingdom
- Buried: Toulouse Cathedral
- Parents: Jules Charles Henri de Clermont-Tonnerre; Marie Anne Julie Le Tonnelier de Breteuil
- Education: Sorbonne University
- Coat of arms

Anne Antoine Jules de Clermont-Tonnerre (1 January 1749 – 21 February 1830) was a French prelate of the Catholic Church. He was made a cardinal by Pope Pius VII in 1822.

== Life ==
He became Bishop of Châlons-sur-Marne in 1782. He was consecrated as bishop on 14 April 1782. He resigned as ordered by Pope Pius VII. He was a member of the states-general in 1789.

He took refuge in Brussels and Holland, while both his parents were guillotined in Paris. After the return of Louis XVIII to the French throne, he was named a Peer of France and appointed to the new Diocese of Châlons in 1817 (that of Châlons-sur-Marne was lost in the reorganization of that year), but the failure of the National Assembly to ratify the new Concordat between France and the Papacy, prevented the reestablishment of the Diocese of Châlons until 1824.

He was named Archbishop of Toulouse on 28 August 1820 and a cardinal on 2 December 1822. He participated in the papal conclaves of 1823 and 1829.

He died in Toulouse on 21 February 1830.
