= Napoleon and Protestants =

Protestantism was generally proscribed in France between 1685 (Edict of Fontainebleau) and 1787 (Edict of Versailles). During that period Roman Catholicism was the state religion. The French Revolution began a process of dechristianisation that lasted from 1792 until the Concordat of 1801, an agreement between the French state and the Papacy (which lasted until 1905). The French general and statesman responsible for the concordat, Napoleon Bonaparte, had a generally favourable attitude towards Protestants, and the concordat did not make Catholicism the state religion again.

In April 1802, Bonaparte unilaterally promulgated the Organic Articles, a law designed to implement the terms of the concordat. It formally recognised the Lutheran and Reformed churches in France, provided for their ministers to be paid by the state and granted them several previously Catholic churches as compensation for Protestant churches destroyed during the persecutions of the reign of King Louis XIV. The articles were not negotiated with either Catholics or Protestants and were not informed by actual Protestant ecclesiology. For the first time, Protestant ministers took part in public ceremonies as paid agents of the state. The first Reformed church was legally established in Paris in 1802, and by 1804 there were 120 Reformed ministers on the state payroll. There had been only forty-eight ministers in France in 1750, all practising underground because it was a capital offence to preach in a Protestant church. The presidents of twenty-seven Reformed consistories were present when Bonaparte was crowned emperor in 1804. By the end of his reign, Napoleon had 137 Reformed pastors in his pay. With the expansion of the French Empire and the direct incorporation of the Netherlands, as well as western and northwestern German regions, France was now in possession of vast Protestant majority areas.

As a result of Napoleon's actions, French Protestants generally considered themselves emancipated and integrated into national life in the period from 1802 until Napoleon's defeat and exile in 1814. The Charter of 1814, the constitution introduced by King Louis XVIII, maintained the freedom of Protestants as it had been under Napoleon while restoring Catholicism as the state religion. Nevertheless, there was widespread violence against Protestants during the Second White Terror in 1815.
