= Alexandre Angélique de Talleyrand-Périgord =

French Cardinal and Politician

His Eminence Alexandre Angélique de Talleyrand-Périgord COHS
- Cardinal, Archbishop of Paris, Grand Almoner of France, Peer of France
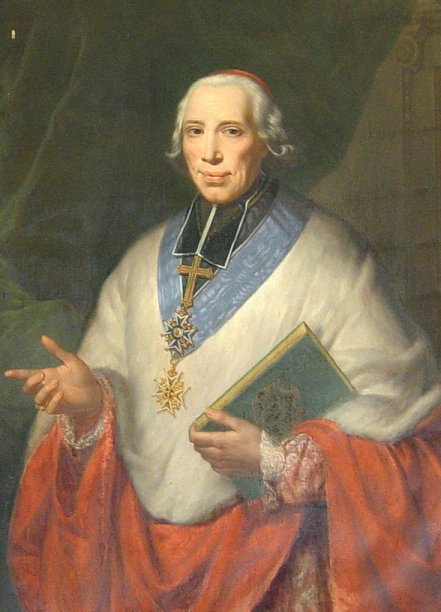
- Church: Roman Catholic Church
- Archdiocese: Paris
- See: Notre-Dame de Paris
- Installed: 1 October 1817
- Term ended: 20 October 1821
- Predecessor: Jean-Sifrein Maury
- Successor: Hyacinthe-Louis de Quélen
- Other posts: Archbishop of Reims; Archbishop of Traianopolis; Abbot of Notre-Dame de Cercamp

Personal details
- Born: 16 October 1736 Paris, France
- Died: 20 October 1821 (aged 85) Paris, France
- Education: Saint-Sulpice Seminary, Paris; Collège de La Flèche, Paris
- Coat of arms

Alexandre Angélique de Talleyrand-Périgord (16 October 1736 – 20 October 1821) was a French Cardinal and archbishop. He was the paternal uncle of Charles-Maurice de Talleyrand-Périgord (1754–1838).

== Life ==
=== Education ===
Alexandre Angélique de Talleyrand-Périgord attended the Jesuit school of La Flèche en Sarthe. He continued at the Saint-Sulpice seminary in Paris, where he graduated with a degree in theology, and at the law faculty at Reims where he obtained a license in utroque jure that is to say, jointly in both canon law and civil law.

=== Early ecclesiastical career ===
Talleyrand-Périgord was ordained a priest in 1761.

He returned to the service of the vicar general of the diocese of Verdun in 1762.

He was elected bishop in partibus of Trajanopolis and was appointed Bishop coadjutor of Reims on December 27, 1766. In that role, he lived a luxurious lifestyle.

He was also Grand Almoner of France, and was elevated to the Archbishopric of Reims, on October 27, 1777.

He became Abbot commendatory of the abbey Notre-Dame de Cercamp from 1777 to 1789.

Talleyrand-Périgord was a member of the Assembly of the Clergy from 1780 to 1788, member of the Assembly of Notables in 1787 and deputy of the clergy to the Estates General of 1789.

=== Exile ===
After the Civil Constitution of the Clergy, he emigrated in 1790 and stayed successively in Aix-la-Chapelle, Weimar and Brunswick. During this time, he had the Abbé Nicolas Baronnet (1744–1820), vicar of Cernay-en-Dormois (Marne), as his secretary.

In 1801, he refused to submit to the Concordat between the Pope and Napoleon Bonaparte and did not resign his position as Archbishop of Reims.

In 1803 he became the representative of the Bourbon heir, Louis XVIII, who was exiled in Poland. Together they came to England, living at Gosfield Hall in Essex and Hartwell House, Buckinghamshire. In 1808, Louis appointed him Grand Almoner, a position he would continue to occupy after the Restoration and until his death.

=== Restoration ===
In 1814 he returned to France upon the first Restoration, and in 1815 he followed Louis XVIII back into exile during the Hundred Days. After the second Restoration, he became a Peer of France.

He finally resigned the Archbishopric of Reims on November 8, 1816.

He was one of the main architects of the Concordat of 11 June 1817.

Pope Pius VII created him cardinal during the consistory of July 28, 1817.

Talleyrand-Périgord was then named Archbishop of Paris, on October 1, 1817, but was not installed until October 1819.

== Distinctions ==
- Commander of the Order of the Holy Spirit

Catholic Church titles
Preceded by Charles Antoine de La Roche-Aymon	Archbishop of Reims; 1777-1816	Succeeded by Jean-Charles de Coucy
Preceded by Jean-Sifrein Maury	Archbishop of Paris; 1817-1821	Succeeded by Hyacinthe-Louis de Quélen
