= Organic Articles =

1802 French law about religion

Europe with the French Empire at its greatest extent in 1812

The Organic Articles (French: Articles Organiques) was a law administering public worship in France.

== History ==
The Articles were originally presented by Napoleon Bonaparte, and consisted of 77 Articles relating to Catholicism and 44 Articles relating to Protestantism. It was published as a unilateral addition to the Concordat of 1801, which is also sometimes referred to as the "French Concordat," on 8 April 1802. Napoleon had it presented it to the Tribunate and the legislative body at the same time that he had them vote on the Concordat itself. It met with opposition from the Catholic Church with Pope Pius VII claiming that the articles had been promulgated without his knowledge.

== Purpose ==
Presenting the Organic Articles was Napoleon’s method of granting the Tribunat and the Corps législatif partial control of the concordat in order to help the state monitor any politically harmful Catholic or Protestant movements or activities. In 1797, two years before Napoleon seized power, there had been a revolt in the Vendée of lay Catholics which had been brutally suppressed. This incident is believed to have inspired the Organic Articles. It was also an attempt to prevent any more religious strife in French cities. For example, Article 45 states, “In cities where there are temples dedicated to different religions, no religious ceremony is to take place outside of the buildings consecrated for Catholic worship.” In towns with adherents of different dogmas, public processions were prohibited.

== Summary of the Articles ==
=== Pertaining to Catholics ===
Title I – “Of the governance of the Catholic Church in its general relations with the rights and the police of the state”, required the authorisation of the Government for the publication and execution of a papal document in France.

Title II – “Of the Ministers” declared the power of ministers and regulated public worship, stating that rules and regulations of seminaries must be presented to the State, the number of those to be ordained must be fixed yearly by the Government, and curés of important parishes cannot be appointed by the bishop without the consent of the State.

Title III – “Of the forms of worship” explained not only restriction of public processions, but the proper clerical dress code, instructing, "All ecclesiastics will be dressed in the French manner in black." It forbade public processions in towns where there are adherents of different creeds, and it prescribed that there shall be only one catechism for all the churches of France. The Imperial Catechism taught that love, respect, and obedience to the emperor were religious obligations.

Title IV – “Of the circumscription of the archbishoprics, bishoprics and parishes, of the buildings intended for worship and of the salaries for the ministers” specified boundaries for the jurisdictions of bishops and the amounts of their salaries.

The Articles allowed the use of church bells, but put this under the joint jurisdiction of the bishop and the prefect. The government exercised control over religious holidays. The Feast of the Assumption (August 15) was one of the holidays retained. It also happened to be Napoleon's birthday.

=== Pertaining to Protestants ===
These articles were largely similar to the Catholic regulations; Protestants favoured parts of the Articles preventing Catholic domination in France. The Calvinist community, a variety of Protestant Christianity, was divided into congregations of adherents governed by clerical leaders appointed by wealthy or powerful taxpayers. Parallel to the Articles relative to Catholicism, the pastors were salaried by the State, and following this, a Calvinist revival was held by the Protestants.

According to Nicholas Atkin:

"Ostensibly these dealt with the policing arrangements referred to in Article 1, but in practice they went much further. Government approbation was required before papal pronunciations could be published, councils convoked, new parishes established and chapels set up. A uniform catechism was introduced, church weddings could not precede the civil ceremony, cathedral chapters were reduced to merely ceremonial function and the powers of papal delegates were severely circumscribed. Any breach of the articles was treated as a criminal offence and was referred to the Council of State.... Although it was not specifically referred to in the Organic Articles, the creation of a Ministry of Cults in 1801 reinforced a drive towards government oversight of ecclesiastical matters."

== Reactions and controversies ==
The Organic Articles read as a list of solutions to past problems in France, such as clerical abuses and sectarian altercations, and was also concerned by the Catholic Church to be a subtle attempt by the State to gain further control of the Church. Napoleon sought to allow the right amount of Catholicism, but not a large amount, in order to prevent further rebellion from the Protestants, therefore issuing of the Organic Articles was considered to be a fault in French Catholicism. Although it restricted specific religious practices in France, it partially allowed other religious freedoms yet still remained in favour of the State. A limited or regulated amount of worship was given, or simply enough to pray for the Republic. Minor issues were addressed in the Articles, but peace between theological controversies was not achieved.

The Concordat was presented to Pope Pius VII for a signature of approval, along with Napoleon’s attachment of the Organic Articles, which somewhat abates parts of the Concordat. The Pope protested against the Organic Articles, saying he had no knowledge of Napoleon's attachment at the time of the agreement, but the protest was in vain. Finally, Pius was humiliated and defeated by the publishing of the Articles. This raised more difficulties for the Pope than solved them.

Though Pius' disapproval was disregarded by Napoleon, many of the Articles eventually became a dead letter. The obscurities of many of them were later shown to be irrelevant, and the need to enforce the laws was unnecessary.

In 1905, the French law was issued declaring the separation of church and state in France. This abolished the Organic Articles along with the Concordat of 1801. However, in the departments of Alsace and Moselle, in 1905 not part of France, the organic articles remain in power (see local law in Alsace-Moselle).

== See also ==
- Grand Sanhedrin
- Infamous Decree
- Napoleon and Protestants
- Napoleon and the Catholic Church
- Napoleon and the Jews
