= Franziskus Herzan von Harras =

Czech cardinal

- Bishop of Szombathely
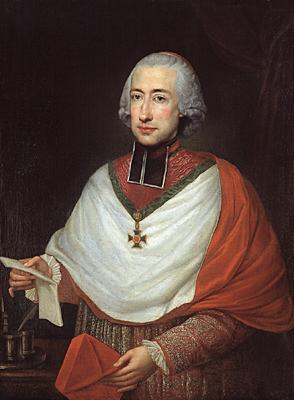
- Native name: František de Paula Hrzán z Harasova
- Church: Catholic Church
- Diocese: Diocese of Szombathely
- In office: 12 May 1800 – 1 June 1804
- Predecessor: János Szily
- Successor: Leopold Perlaki Somogy
- Other post: Cardinal-Priest of Santa Croce in Gerusalemme (1788-1804)
- Previous posts: Cardinal-Priest of Santi Nereo e Achilleo (1782-1788); Cardinal-Priest of San Girolamo dei Croati (1780-1782)

Orders
- Ordination: 18 February 1758
- Consecration: 18 May 1800 by Pope Pius VII
- Created cardinal: 12 July 1779 by Pope Pius VI

Personal details
- Born: 5 April 1735 Prague, Kingdom of Bohemia, Holy Roman Empire
- Died: 1 June 1804 (aged 69) Vienna, Archduchy of Austria, Austrian Circle, Holy Roman Empire

Franziskus von Paula Herzan von Harras or František de Paula Hrzán z Harasova (5 April 1735, in Prague – 1 June 1804, in Vienna) was a Roman Catholic cardinal from what is now the Czech Republic.

== Life ==
Baptized on 9 April 1735, von Harras graduated from the Gregoriana in Rome on 29 March 1757 - at that time he was living in the German College. On 18 February 1758 he became a priest and an auditor of the Roman Rota. He also served as Austria's ambassador to the Holy See.

He was made a cardinal on 12 July 1779 by Pope Pius VI and 11 December 1780 granted the titular church of San Girolamo degli Schiavoni. On 13 September 1782 he was made cardinal priest of Santi Nereo e Achilleo and on 7 April 1788 cardinal priest of Santa Croce in Gerusalemme. On 7 April 1788 he was made Camerlengo of the Sacred College of Cardinals.

He served as imperial commissioner at the papal conclave of 1799 to 1800, presenting Francis II's objections to the selection of Cardinals Hyacinthe Sigismond Gerdil and Carlo Antonio Giuseppe Bellisomi. This was handled by Cardinal Herzan without the use of the formal veto, but by collecting a sufficient number of votes to deny the candidate under consideration the two-thirds vote that he needed to be elected (the 'virtual veto'). That conclave selected pope Pius VII, who on 12 May 1800 made von Harras bishop of Szombathely - his appointment ceremony took place on Sunday 18 May 1800 in the monastic church of San Giorgio Maggiore in Venice.
