= Hyacinthe Sigismond Gerdil =

Italian theologian, bishop, and cardinal

His Eminence Hyacinthe Sigismond Gerdil CRSP
- Cardinal-Priest of Santa Cecilia in Trastevere; Titular Bishop of Dibona
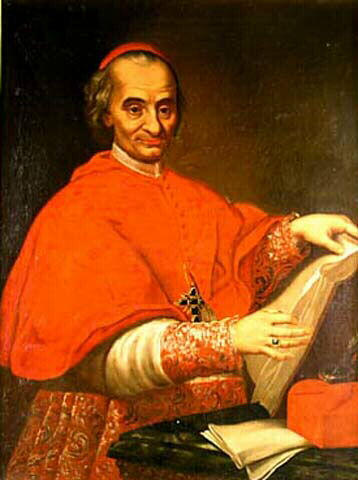
- Hyacinthe Sigismond Gerdil
- Previous posts: Camerlengo of the Holy Roman Church (1786-1787); Cardinal-Priest of San Giovanni a Porta Latina (1780-1784)

Orders
- Ordination: 11 June 1741
- Consecration: 2 March 1777 by Marcantonio Colonna
- Created cardinal: 23 June 1777 by Pope Pius VI
- Rank: Cardinal-Priest

Personal details
- Born: 16 August 1724 Samoëns, Savoy
- Died: August 12, 1802 (aged 84) Rome, Italy
- Buried: San Carlo ai Catinari
- Denomination: Catholic Church

Hyacinthe Sigismond Gerdil, CRSP (23 June 1718 – 12 August 1802) was an Italian theologian, bishop, and cardinal. He was a significant figure in the response of the papacy to the dechristianization of France during the French Revolution.

== Life ==
=== Early life ===
Jean-François Gerdil was born in 1718 at Samoëns in the Duchy of Savoy to Pierre Gerdil, a notary, and Françoise Perrier, a native of Taninges. When 15 years old, he joined the Barnabites at Annecy, taking the name Hyacinthe Sigismond. He was sent to Bologna to pursue his theological studies; also having an interest in the sciences, he devoted his mind to the various branches of knowledge with great success. While he improved his command of Italian, he came the attention of Propero Lambertini, Archbishop of Bologna, later Pope Benedict XIV, who used the young seminarian to translate French texts.

After Gerdil had completed his initial studies in 1738, he was assigned to teach philosophy first at the Barnabite college in Macerata, then at the school at Casale Monferrato (1739-1748). During this period, in 1741, he was ordained to the priesthood. By 1749, the range and quality of his writings led to his induction by various scientific and literary societies across Europe, ranging from the Bologna Institute of Sciences and the Royal Society of London to the Accademia degli Arcadi in Rome. That same year, he was appointed as professor of philosophy at the University of Turin, transferring to the teach of moral theology in 1754.

In 1758, upon the recommendation of Pope Benedict XIV, Gerdil was chosen as the tutor of the Prince of Piedmont, afterwards King Charles Emmanuel IV. He left his teaching position at the university the following year to deal with his other responsibilities. In 1764, he was elected the Provincial Superior of the Barnabites in Savoy and the Piedmont. In 1768, he was chosen as the tutor of the sons of his previous student, now the King of Sardinia.

=== Cardinalate ===
Gerdil was designated a cardinal in petto in 1773 by Pope Clement XIV. However, that pope died before his appointment could be made public. He was appointed as a consultor to the Holy Office in 1776 by Pope Pius VI, moving to Rome, where he took a residence next to the General Motherhouse of the Barnabite Order at the Church of San Carlo ai Catinari. The King of Sardinia named him the commendatory abbot of the Abbey of San Michele della Chiusa in January 1777. He carried out his supervision of the distant abbey from Rome through correspondence, devoting much of the benefice he gained to the help of the poor.

In March of that same year, Gerdil was appointed the bishop of the titular see of Dibona, and was consecrated at the Barnabite church by Cardinal Marcantonio Colonna, the Vicar General of Rome. The following June, he again named a cardinal in petto by Pope Pius, receiving the red hat on 18 December 1777 and the titular church of San Giovanni a Porta Latina on 30 March 1778. The pope also appointed him to various congregations of the Roman Curia, including that of Prefect of the Propaganda Fide.

Gerdil changed his title to that of the Basilica of Santa Cecilia in Trastevere. He served briefly as the Camerlengo of the Holy Roman Church (1786-1787).

Gerdil was member of the committee of cardinals which examined and refined the text of the response against the Puntuazione di Ems, issued by the archbishops of Germany in which they defied papal authority. From 1790 to 1794, he was member of the committee which prepared the final draft of the papal bull, Auctorem fidei (28 August 1794), which condemned the propositions of the Synod of Pistoia, a similar stand by the bishops of Tuscany. During those four years, he was also president of the particular congregation charged with the preparation of the papal documents which condemned the French Civil Constitution of the Clergy, the Civic Oath imposed to the French clergy in 1798, and other acts imposed on the Church by Revolutionary France.

After the invasion of Rome by the French Revolutionary Army in February 1798, the pope fled to Siena, while Gerdil fled to his Abbey of San Michele. After the death of Pope Pius in 1799, he would likely have been elected pope at the conclave of Venice in 1800, had not his election been vetoed by Cardinal Franziskus Herzan von Harras, in the name of Francis II, the last Holy Roman Emperor.

After the conclave accompanied the new pope, Pius VII, to Rome, where he resumed his posts in the Curia, still being fit and active, despite being past the age of 80. After a brief illness he died at the Barnabite motherhouse and was buried in the Church of San Carlo ai Catinari.

== Works ==
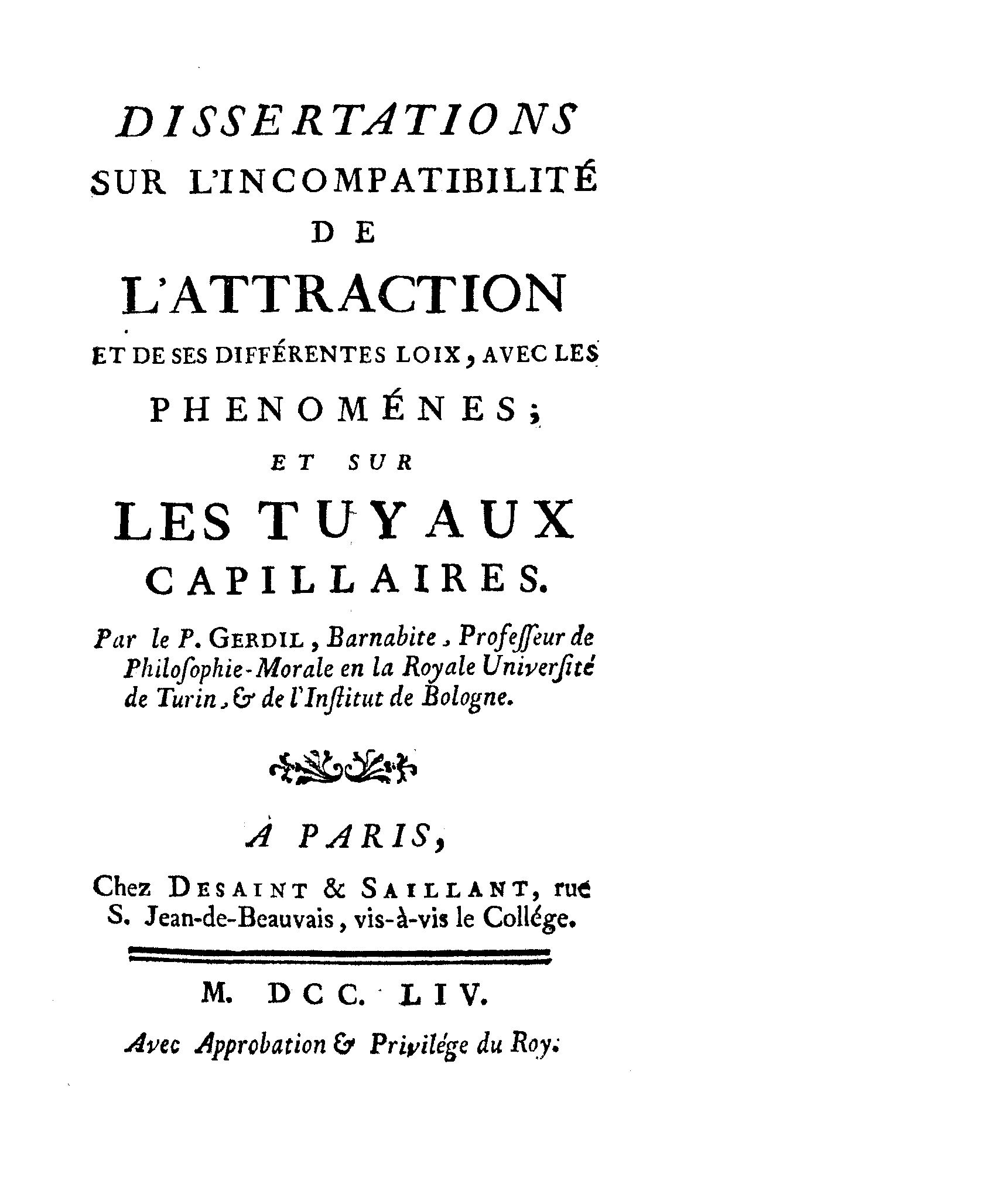
Dissertations sur l'incompatibilité de l'attraction et de ses différentes loix, avec les phenoménes, 1754

Gerdil's numerous works written in Latin, Italian, and French on various subjects of dogmatic and moral theology, canon law, philosophy, pedagogy, history, physical and natural sciences, etc., form twenty volumes in quarto (ed. Rome, 1806–1821). Among the most important are: L'Immortalité de l'âme démontrée contre Locke et défense du P. Malebranche contre ce philosophe (Turin, 1747–48), 2 vols.; Réflexions sur la théorie et la pratique de l'éducation contre les principes de J.-J. Rousseau (Turin, 1765), reprinted in a new edition under the title Anti-Emile; Exposition des caractères de la vraie religion, written in Italian (translated into French, Paris, 1770), etc.

Gerdil's works were written especially for the defence of spiritual philosophy against materialism, of supernatural religion against Deism, of the supreme authority of the pope against Febronianism and the Synod of Pistoia.

== For further reading ==
- Gerdil, Giacinto Sigismondo. Opere edite e inedite. (in Italian). Volume 1. Napoli: Tip. del Diogene, 1853. Vol. 2 (1854). Vol. 3 (1854). Vol. 4 (1855).
- Piantoni, Giovanni (1851). Vita del cardinale Giacinto Sigismondo Gerdil Barnabita e analisi di tutte le stampate sue opere. (in Italian). Roma: Salviucci, 1851.
- Stella, Pietro (2000). "Gerdil, Giacinto Sigismondo". Dizionario Biografico degli Italiani (in Italian). Vol. 53: Gelati–Ghisalberti. Rome: Institute of the Italian Encyclopaedia. ISBN 978-88-12-00032-6.
- Yolton, John W. (1984). Thinking Matter: Materialism in Eighteenth-Century Britain. Minneapolis: U. of Minnesota Press 1984. Pp. 24-26.
