= Carlo Bellisomi =

Italian Roman Catholic cardinal and apostolic nuncio

Carlo Antonio Giuseppe Bellisomi (30 July 1736 in Pavia – 9 August 1808 in Cesena, Emilia-Romagna) was an Italian Roman Catholic cardinal and apostolic nuncio.

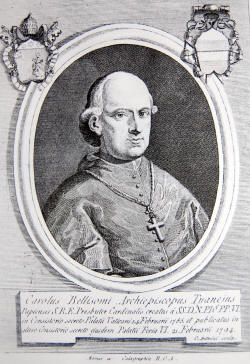
Carlo Bellisomi, was a Catholic cardinal.

== Life ==
He was made a priest on 29 May 1763 and on 11 September 1775 titular bishop of Tyana. On 20 September 1775, he became nuncio to Cologne. Before taking up the post, he was ordained a bishop on 24 September 1775 by Pope Pius VI.

On 14 February 1785, the Pope appointed him cardinal in pectore and on 7 May 1785 nuncio to Portugal. On 21 February 1794, he was publicly appointed a cardinal and on 22 September 1795 bishop of Cesena, where he held the personal title of prince bishop.

On 18 December 1795, he was appointed cardinal priest of the titular church of Santa Maria della Pace.

Pope Pius VI died on 29 August 1799 at Valence in the custody of the French. Due to the French occupation of Rome, the conclave that followed was held in Venice. Bellisomi, seemed a viable candidate (papabile), with some eighteen committed votes. However, he was unpopular with the Austrian faction, who preferred Cardinal Alessandro Mattei, the Archbishop of Ferrara, and therefore, could not obtain the canonically required two-thirds vote.

On 18 September 1807, he opted for the titular church of Santa Prassede.
