= The Hurdy-Gurdy Player =

Painting by Georges de La Tour

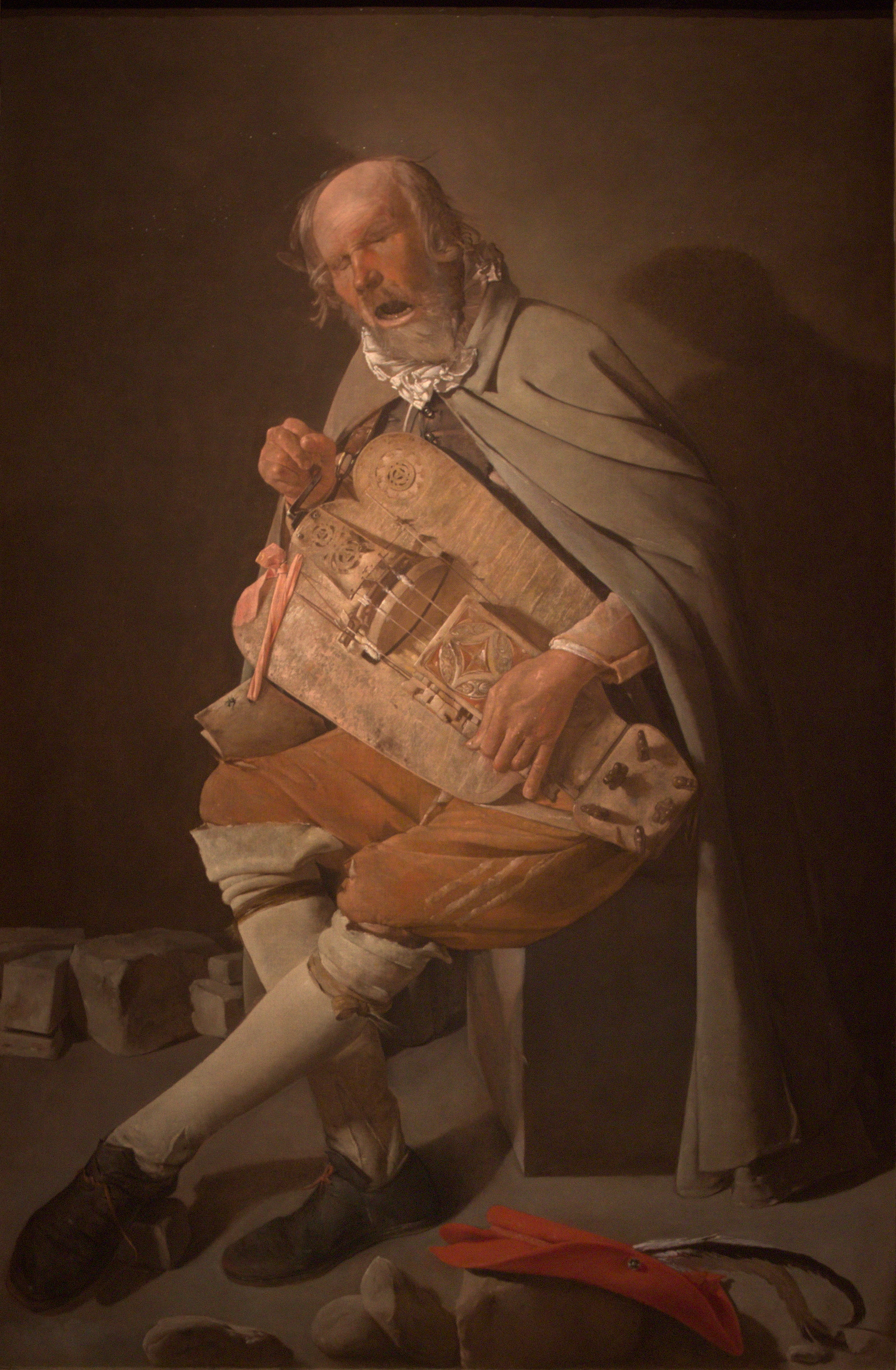
- Artist: Georges de La Tour
- Year: c.1620–1625
- Medium: oil on canvas
- Dimensions: 162 cm × 105 cm (64 in × 41 in)
- Location: Musée d'Arts de Nantes, Nantes

The Hurdy-Gurdy Player (French: Le Vielleur) is an oil-on-canvas painting by Georges de La Tour. The artist neither signed nor dated it, but it was produced in the first phase of his career, probably between 1620 and 1625. It is also known as The Hurdy-Gurdy Player in a Hat (Le Vielleur au chapeau) or The Hurdy-Gurdy Player with a Fly (Le Vielleur à la mouche). It is now in the Musée d'Arts de Nantes.

== Description ==
The painting depicts an impoverished blind beggar singing in the street to the music of his hurdy-gurdy, an instrument traditionally associated with street singers. The hurdy-gurdy, portrayed in great detail in de la Tour's canvas, works by means of a hand turned wheel rubbing against a set of strings, whose pitch can be adjusted by hand operated wedges.

The beggar's distorted face and worn clothing are designed to invoke sympathy in the viewer for his situation. The existence of a fly on the singer's doublet (above his right knee) gives the work its alternative name and, in its proximity to such a beautiful instrument, can be interpreted as a comment on the fragility of life.

== History, attribution and provenance ==
The first recorded mention of the work is in the collection of the Nantes-born diplomat François Cacault (1847–1805) at Clisson – a posthumous assessment of his collection on 6 November 1808 called the work "very capital", attributed it to Murillo and valued it at 6000 francs. The city collection bought it and it was hung in mayor Bertrand Geslin's office in the town hall, before being moved to its present home in 1830. From 1830 until 1903 the museum's catalogues noted it as a work by Murillo or the Spanish school. In 1836 Prosper Mérimée, then inspector general of France's historic monuments, admired the work during a trip to survey paintings in western France.

From 1923 doubts about the attribution of the painting began to surface but it was not until 1934–35 that general acceptance of its authorship, primarily by comparison with other similar works by the artist, was achieved.

== Other works on the same subject by Georges de La Tour ==
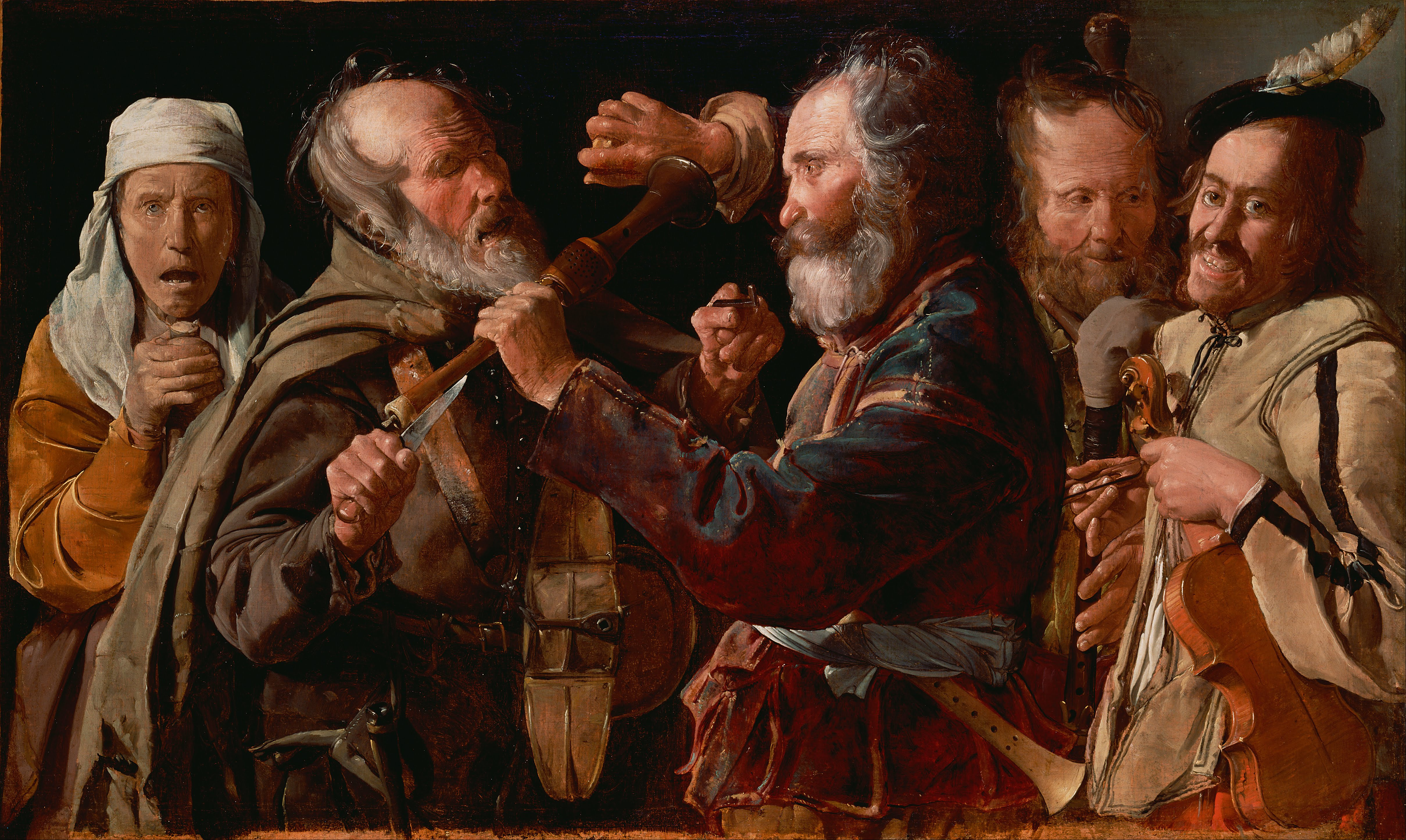
The Musicians' Brawl, 94 × 104,1 cm, The J. Paul Getty Museum, Los Angeles, c. 1620-1625

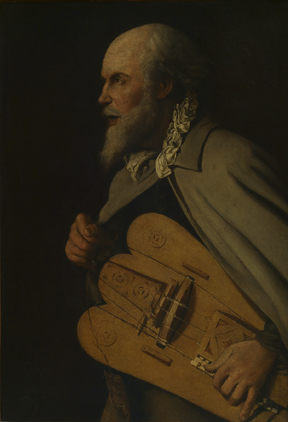
Hurdy-Gurdy Player, fragment of A Consort of Musicians, 85 × 58 cm, Royal Museums of Fine Arts of Belgium, Brussels, c. 1620-1625

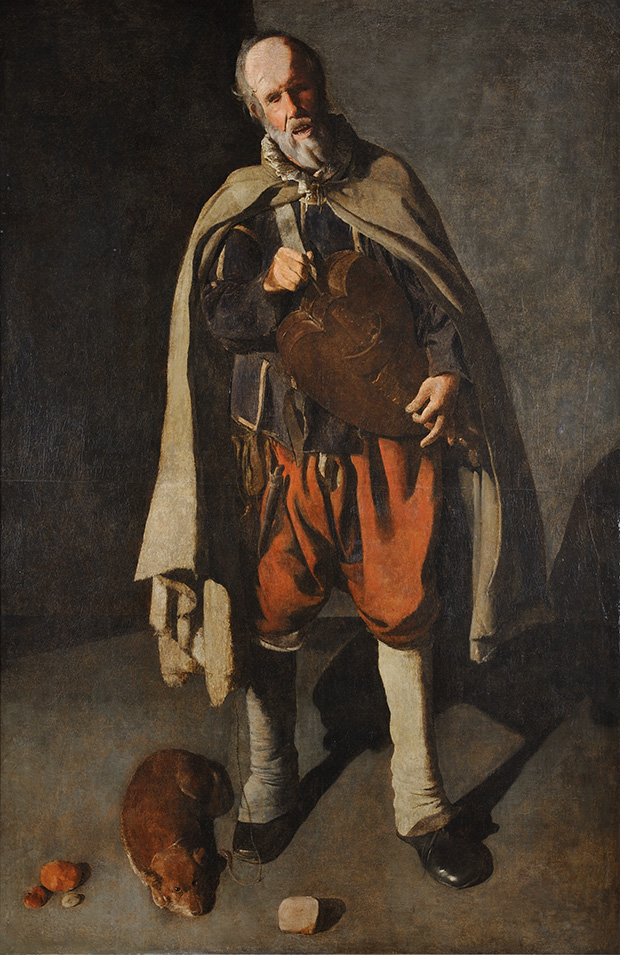
The Hurdy-Gurdy Player with a Dog, 186 × 120 cm, musée municipal de Bergues, c. 1622-1625

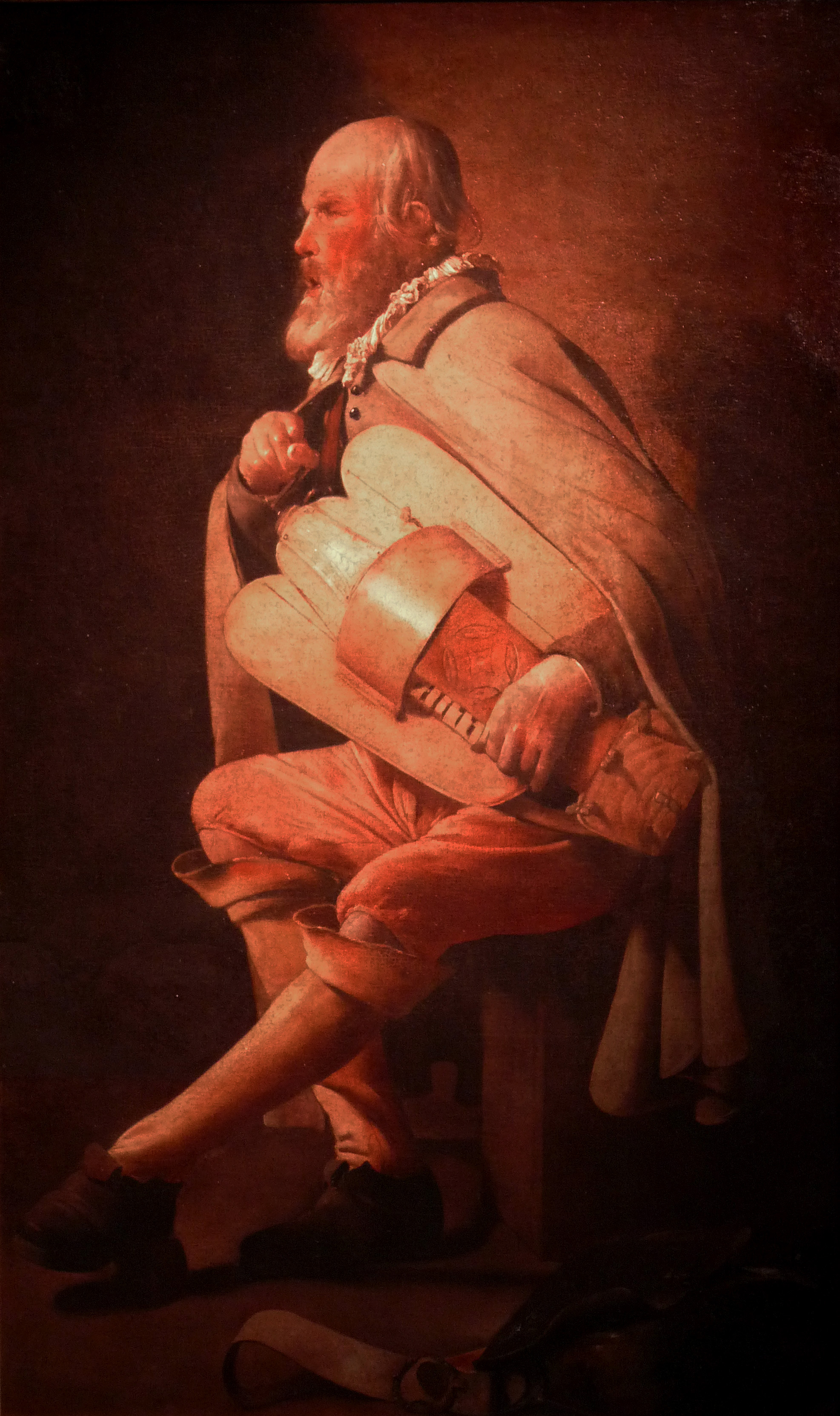
The Waidmann Hurdy-Gurdy Player, 157 × 94 cm, musée municipal Charles-Friry, Remiremont

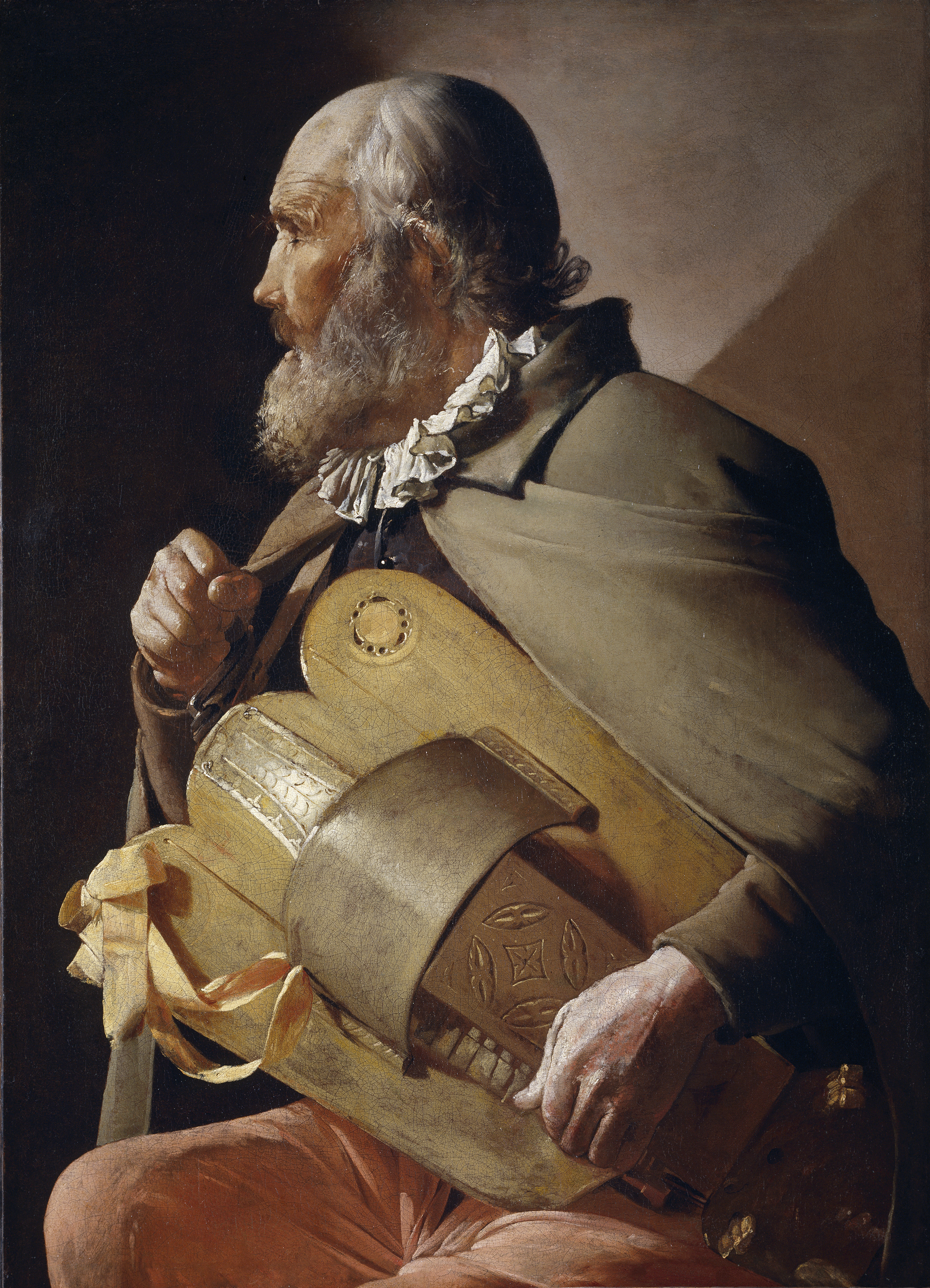
The Hurdy-Gurdy Player with a Ribbon (fragment), 84 × 61 cm, museo del Prado, Madrid, c.1640

== References (in English) ==
- Conisbee, Philip. “An Introduction to the Life and Art of Georges de La Tour,” in Philip Conisbee (ed.), Georges de La Tour and His World, exh. cat. Washington, DC, National Gallery of Art; Fort Worth, Kimbell Art Museum 1996, pp. 13–147.
- Judovitz, Dalia. “Georges de La Tour and the Enigma of the Visible”, New York, Fordham University Press, 2018. ISBN 0-82327-744-5; ISBN 9780823277445.

== Bibliography (in French) ==
- Arasse, Daniel (2008) [1992], Le Détail: pour une histoire rapprochée de la peinture, Paris: Flammarion, pp. 128 & 214–215, ISBN 978-2-0812-1740-9
- Cuzin, Jean-Pierre; Rosenberg, Pierre (1997), Georges de La Tour: Paris, Galeries nationales du Grand Palais, 3 octobre 1997-26 janvier 1998, Preface by Jacques Thuillier, Paris: Réunion des musées nationaux et du Grand Palais des Champs-Élysées, pp. 136–139, ISBN 2-7118-3592-8 (Catalogue no. 23, Le Vielleur, also known as Le Vielleur au chapeau or Le Vielleur à la mouche).
- Cuzin, Jean-Pierre; Salmon, Dimitri (1997), Georges de La Tour: histoire d'une redécouverte, Découvertes Gallimard / Arts, Paris: Gallimard, Réunion des musées nationaux, ISBN 2-07-030053-6
- Quignard, Pascal (2005), Georges de La Tour, Paris: Éditions Galilée, p. 70, ISBN 978-2718606705
- Rosenberg, Pierre; Mojana, Marina (1992), Georges de La Tour: catalogue complet des peintures, Fleurons de l'art, Paris: Éditions Bordas, p. 44, ISBN 978-2040195984
- Thuillier, Jacques (1985) [1973], Tout l'œuvre peint de Georges de La Tour, Les Classiques de l'Art (2nd ed.), Paris, ISBN 2-08-010258-3
- Thuillier, Jacques (2012) [1992], Georges de La Tour, Les Grandes monographies, Paris: Flammarion, pp. 82–91, and "Catalogue des œuvres" no. 20, p. 285, ISBN 978-20812-86085
