= The Hurdy-Gurdy Player with a Dog =

Painting by Georges de La Tour

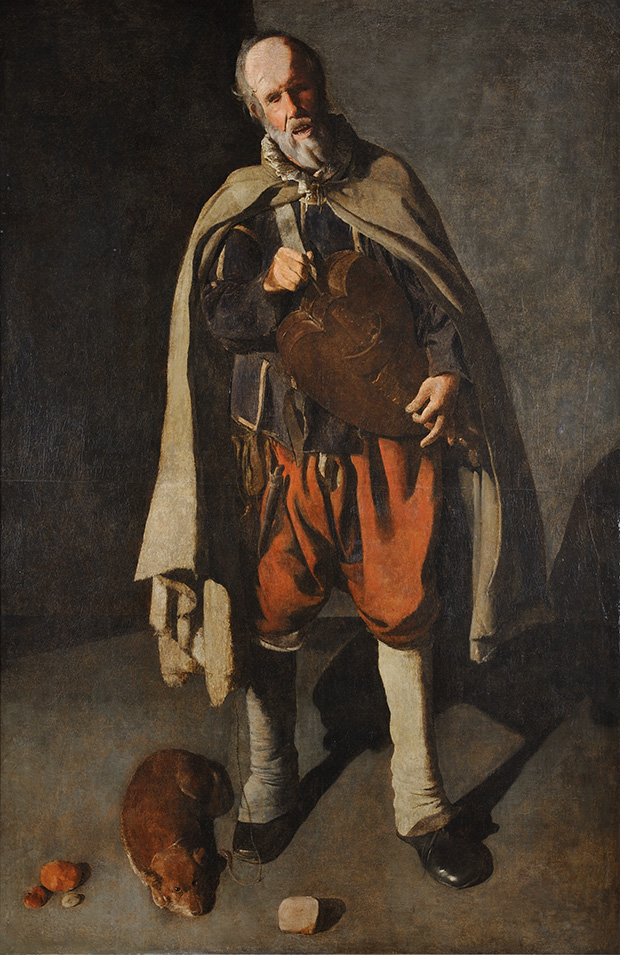
- Artist: Georges de La Tour
- Year: c.1622
- Dimensions: 1,86 cm × 1,20 cm (73 in × 47 in)
- Location: Musée du Mont-de-Piété de Bergues

The Hurdy-Gurdy Player with a Dog is an oil-on-canvas painting executed c. 1622 by the French artist Georges de La Tour, now in the Musée du Mont-de-Piété de Bergues. It belongs to his early period and forms part of a set of works on the same subject, which also includes The Hurdy-Gurdy Player. He is also featured in The Musicians' Brawl.

== Date ==
This painting belongs to the first period of the artist, the diurnal period, in which – against the current of the painting of the time marked by mannerism – La Tour depicted peasants and beggars in all the crudeness of their truth.

It is one of a series of paintings of old beggars. According to a general consensus, The Hurdy-Gurdy Player with a Dog is the oldest painting by La Tour on this subject, datable to around the 1620s, and in any case, predating The Hurdy-Gurdy Player of the Musée d'Arts de Nantes, held to be the most accomplished.

== Description ==
The canvas, monumental in size (186 cm × 120 cm; 73 in × 47 in), is the largest currently attributed to the painter.

It represents, full length and to scale, a blind beggar singing and accompanying himself on the hurdy-gurdy. A small dog who lies by his side on a leash probably serves as his guide. The shallow depth is suggested by pebbles and cobblestone in the foreground, and by the intersection of two side walls blocking the background, the left one in shadow, the right one illuminated by a light whose source is located in front of the frame, on the left. The shadow of the old man stands out clearly on the ground and extends onto the wall, at the right edge of the frame.

The old man has a dramatic and pitiful side at the same time, which is reinforced by the bareness of the decor, the harshness of the lighting, the voice frozen in the open mouth, and the man's unstable stance emphasized by his advanced left foot. The shining eyes that the little dog directs at the spectator, in contrast to the closed eyes of the blind man, add to the melancholy of the scene.

== Provenance ==
The first mention of the painting dates from 3 February 1791 when Joseph Delorge, painter and director of the Bergues drawing school, was commissioned to write the Etats et Notices des Monuments et Peinture, sculpture and engraving from the furniture of the Abbey of Saint-Winoc in Bergues. It is thus described there, at number 77: "A poor man playing the hurdy-gurdy, orig[inal] by Carache [sic] Urbain, on canvas, 5 ft, 6 in by 3 ft 6 in". Kept for a time in the abbey library, it was transferred, with the entire deposit, to the former Jesuit college in the city between 3 December 1792 and 5 January 1793.

In 1800, the painting was one of the thirty-eight works that the sub-prefect Louis Schadet chose "to adorn the audience hall and adjoining rooms" of the sub-prefecture of Bergues, then installed at the Town Hall. In the handwritten list that he established on the occasion of the transfer, the painting, under number 12, is presented as a "blind man playing the hurdy-gurdy, led by his dog", and attributed to "Michelangelo" – meaning Caravaggio. It entered the museum of Bergues in 1838. It is then described, without attribution but as an original painting, under number 18 of the Catalogue of existing paintings of at the hotel of the town hall of the city of Bergues as "a beggar of natural size 175 × 130 cm".

In 1842, the painting was entrusted, along with other works, to the painter Fabien-Napoléon Léoni to be restored. The relatively high cost of this restoration, which amounts to 250 francs, suggests that the painting was already in poor condition. Around 1846, it was placed in the gallery that the town hall dedicated to this purpose. A handwritten list, probably made by one of the members of the museum commission, then attributes The Old Man to Zurbarán.

In 1871, the painting was welcomed into the rooms of the new town hall converted into a museum. In the Catalogue of paintings exhibited in the gallery of the museum of Bergues written by the painter and restorer Pierre-Antoine Verlinde (1801–1877), the Beggar playing the hurdy-gurdy, under number 97, is attributed to José de Ribera. It is described as follows: "A blind old man, covered with a ragged garment and cloak, sings to the accompaniment of an hurdy-gurdy. The dog leading him by a rope is lying at his feet."

It was transferred to the city's former Mont-de-Piété when it was transformed into a museum in 1953.

=== Attribution to Georges de La Tour ===
Noticed in 1925 by Pierre Landry, who was the first to bring it closer to the works of the master then in full rediscovery, the painting was chosen by Charles Sterling to appear in an exhibition of "painters of reality" that opened in November 1934 at the l'Orangerie of the Tuileries, but still cautiously attributed to the "workshop of Georges de La Tour". Cleaned on this occasion, it remained in Paris to be completely restored. At the end of the operation, which lasted fourteen months and was graciously donated by Pierre Landry, the painting was exhibited for some time, from June 1936, in the new acquisitions room of the Musée du Louvre.

It was not until 1958 that Michel Laclotte placed The Hurdy-Gurdy Player with a Dog alongside the originals from La Tour, and in particular The Hurdy-Gurdy Player in Nantes, on the occasion of the exhibition entitled The French XVII|e. Masterpieces from provincial museums. Since then, the painting has appeared in other exhibitions devoted to the painter from Lorraine, whether it be the first retrospective held from May to September 1972 at the Musée de l'Orangerie (catalogue number 3), or that of the Galeries nationales du Grand Palais, from 3 October 1997 to 26 January 1998 (catalogue number 16).

== Bibliography ==
- Beaussant, Philippe. 2011. Le Vielleur Au Chien: Une Lecture De Le Vielleur Au Chien Vers 1620 De Georges De La Tour Musée Du Mont-De-Piété Bergues. Ennetières-en-Weppes: Éditions Invenit. ISBN 978-2918698111. (French language)
- Conisbee, Philip, Jean-Pierre Cuzin, National Gallery of Art (U.S.) and Kimbell Art Museum. 1996. Georges De La Tour and His World. Washington D. C: National Gallery of Art. ISBN 9780300069488.
- Cuzin, Jean-Pierre; Rosenberg, Pierre (1997). Georges de La Tour: Paris, Galeries nationales du Grand Palais, 3 octobre 1997-26 janvier 1998 (in French). Paris: Réunion des Musées nationaux. pp. 116–119. ISBN 2-7118-3592-8.
- Cuzin, Jean-Pierre; Salmon, Dimitri (1997). Georges de La Tour: sous-titre=Histoire d'une redécouverte (in French). Paris: Gallimard, Réunion des musées nationaux. ISBN 2-07-030053-6.
- Thuillier, Jacques (2012) [1992]. Georges de La Tour (in French). Paris: Flammarion. ISBN 978-2-08-128608-5.
