= Armistice of Bologna =

1796 treaty between France and the Papal States

The Armistice of Bologna was a treaty signed between the Papal States and the French First Republic on 23 June 1796. It resulted in a ceasefire between the two parties that was intended to last until a permanent peace treaty could be signed (the 1797 Treaty of Tolentino). The terms of the armistice included the payment of 15 million livres in cash in addition to goods and works of art to the French and significant territorial reductions. A temporary Austrian victory against the French at the Siege of Mantua persuaded Pope Pius VI to renounce the armistice in September 1796. The French subsequently invaded the Papal States and enforced the terms of the armistice.

== Background ==
The French Army under Napoleon had been victorious in its campaigns against Austria in Northern Italy and had captured the papal territories of Bologna and Ferrara. Pope Pius VI, seeing no alternative, dispatched José Nicolás de Azara – the Spanish resident minister in Rome – to Napoleon to negotiate a ceasefire. Azara, who received full plenipotentiary powers from Pius VI, had previously dealt with Napoleon during negotiations held in Milan. The French government was represented by Antoine Christophe Saliceti and Pierre-Anselm Garrau. These ministers had been ordered to take the lead in negotiations by the French Directory and were disliked by Napoleon who believed he would receive better terms without their involvement. Napoleon desired 25 million livres in cash, 5 million livres of goods and 300 works of art from the Pope.

== Terms of the treaty ==
The treaty was signed by Napoleon on 23 June, after his arrival at Bologna with his army, and though still harsh, fell short of his original demands. The papacy agreed to pay France 15 million livres in cash, 5.5 million livres in goods, as well as 100 works of art and 500 manuscripts of France's choosing. In addition Pius VI had to consent to entering negotiations for a full peace treaty (which became the 1797 Treaty of Tolentino), provide a pension to the family of Nicolas Jean Hugon de Bassville (a French representative who was murdered in Rome in 1793), cede Bologna, Ferrara, and the citadel of Ancona to France, and release all political prisoners. Additionally he was to end his calls for a crusade against France and his demands for the reinstatement of the clergy, who had been removed during the French Revolution. The port of Rome was to open trade with French vessels and refuse entry to other foreign ships.

The terms were harsh upon the Papal States and threatened the states' financial wellbeing. It fell short of some of the directory's original demands which included the abolition of the papacy, establishment of a republic in Rome and the rescinding of Papal bulls issued since 1789 that criticised the French Republic. Pius did, however, consent to issuing instructions that all French Catholics were to support the republican government. The French installed François Cacault as their minister in Rome with a remit to ensure that the terms of the armistice were complied with.

== Renunciation ==
The unexpected success of Austrian General Dagobert Sigmund von Wurmser's forces during the first relief of the Siege of Mantua in August led Pius to renounce the treaty in September. The Pope halted the shipment of the remaining 16 million livres of tribute that was bound for Bologna and resumed control of Ferrara. However the French soon regained the initiative, defeating the Austrians, invading the remaining Papal States and enforcing a resumption of the armistice terms. The subsequent February 1797 Treaty of Tolentino imposed still harsher terms on the Papal States, including further cash payments.

== Sources ==
- Coppa, Frank J. (2016). The Modern Papacy, 1798–1995. Routledge. ISBN 9781317894889.
- Lee, Henry (1837). The Life of Napoleon Bonaparte: Down to the Peace of Tolentino and the Close of His First Campaign in Italy. T. and W. Boone.
- Montholon, General Count (1846). History of the Captivity of Napoleon at Helena. Vol. II. Рипол Классик. ISBN 9785874249403.
- Phillipson, Coleman (2008). Termination of War and Treaties of Peace. The Lawbook Exchange, Ltd. ISBN 9781584778608.
