= Treaty of Tolentino =

1797 treaty between France and the Papal States

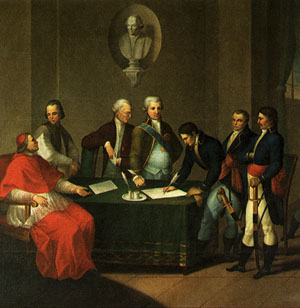
- Signing of the treaty
- Signed: 19 February 1797
- Location: Tolentino, Papal States
- Parties: French Republic; Papal States

The Treaty of Tolentino was a peace treaty between Revolutionary France and the Papal States, signed on 19 February 1797 and imposing terms of surrender on the Papal side. The signatories for France were the French Directory's Ambassador to the Holy See, François Cacault, and the rising General Napoleon Bonaparte and opposite them four representatives of Pope Pius VI's curia.

It was part of the events following the Italian campaign of 1796–1797, during the War of the First Coalition. Having defeated the Austrians at the Battle of Mantua, at the Battle of Arcole and in the Battle of Rivoli, Bonaparte had no more enemies in northern Italy and was able to devote himself to the Papal States. Following nine months of negotiations between France and the Papal States, in February 1797 9,000 French soldiers invaded the Papal Romagna region, leaving the Pope no choice but to accept the French terms.

== Terms ==
The treaty confirmed the harsh terms of the preceding armistice signed at Bologna, adding 15 million livre to the indemnity of 21 millions previously extracted from the Papal States—36 million in all. In addition, the papal city of Avignon and its territory, the Comtat Venaissin, which had been occupied by French forces at an early stage of the Revolution, were formally ceded to France - putting a definite end to half a millennium of Papal rule. The papal legations of Romagna, Ferrara, and Bologna, already invaded by the French, were also ceded by the Papal States and incorporated into the newly created Cispadane Republic.

The treaty also formalized the confiscation of artistic treasures from the Vatican. Over a hundred paintings and other works of art were to go to the Louvre in Paris. The French commissioners reserved the right to enter any building, public, religious or private, to make their choice and assessment of what was to be taken to France. This part of the treaty was extended to apply to all of Italy in 1798 by treaties with other Italian states.

Other conditions imposed on the Papal States included a compensation to the family of French journalist Hugh de Basseville, killed by a crowd in Rome for having allegedly "insulted the Pope", and giving consent to the stationing of French troops in Ancona until the end of the war.

== Criticism ==
Of the French terms, the confiscation of artistic works - or, as many considered it, theft and plunder - came under criticism and its legitimacy questioned. Among the fiercest opponents was Quatremère de Quincy who in 1796 wrote a pamphlet, Letters in Miranda, in which he affirmed the strong relationship between a work of art and the place in which it was intended, asserting that "eradicating the context in which the work was created irreparably impairs its legibility".

Of the confiscated works of art, a marble copy of a bronze statue of Lucius Junius Brutus remains in Paris. However, most of the works were restored after Napoleon's fall, and the main works are now located in the Vatican Gardens in Rome. The bronze statue of Lucius Junius Brutus has returned to the Capitoline Museums.

== Aftermath ==
The treaty did not satisfy the French Directory, which still sought to end the temporal power of the Holy See. Just a year later, the French Army invaded the rest of the Papal States and arrested Pius VI, imposing a Roman Republic.

== See also ==
- List of treaties

== Sources ==
- Coppa, Frank J. (2016). The Modern Papacy, 1798–1995. Routledge. ISBN 9781317894889.
- Filippone, Giustino Le relazioni tra lo stato pontificio e la francia rivoluzionaria: Storia diplomatica del Trattato di Tolentino Part I (1961) Part II (1967) The standard modern treatment.
