= Pierre-Anselme Garrau =

French lawyer and politician (1762–1829)

Pierre-Anselme Garrau (19 February 1762 – 15 October 1829) was a French lawyer and politician. He served as a replacement deputy to the Legislative Assembly and the National Convention. He is notable for his part in the negotiations leading to the Armistice of Bologna.
