= Pierre Cacault =

French painter (1744–1810)

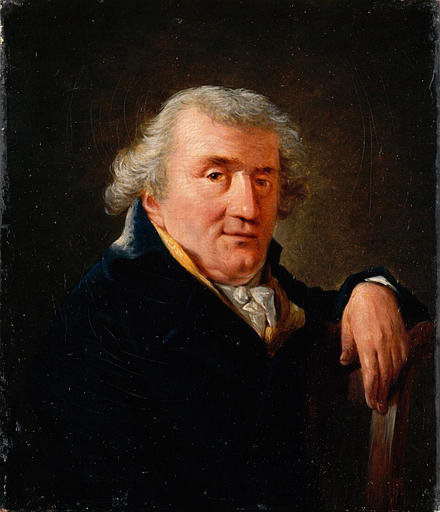
Pierre-René Cacault

Pierre René Cacault (November 1, 1744 – January 29, 1810) was a French painter.

== Life ==
He was born in Nantes. The younger brother of the diplomat and collector François Cacault, Pierre worked as a painter at the family faience business and helped manage it for a while before leaving for Paris to study painting. In 1774, as bursar of the town of Nantes, he left for Rome, where he studied under Vien and began producing history paintings. He then painted for nearly 20 years, meeting many other artists such as Mathurin and Louis Crucy, Coste, David, Antonio Canova and François-Frédéric Lemot.

From 1780 the town of Nantes petitioned him (in vain) to become its roads-architect as his father had been, but the anti-French riots of 1793 forced him to leave Rome and return to Nantes. From 1796 Pierre bought the métairies at Clisson and in the region. He set up home in the former rectory of the Madeleine in 1798. In his brother's absence (in Italy until 1803) he took on overseeing the construction of buildings for a museum-school, completed in 1804, in a picturesque Italian-inspired architectural style. This exhibiting of the Cacault collection was, however, temporary - on his brother's death in 1805, Pierre tried in vain to negotiate the sale of the museum and its collections (whose leadership Pierre transferred to Lemot) to the government. On 27 January 1810 Nantes's mayor Bertrand-Geslin bought the collection for the town, and two days later Pierre died.
