= Nicolas Jean Hugou de Basseville =

French journalist and diplomatist (1743–1793)

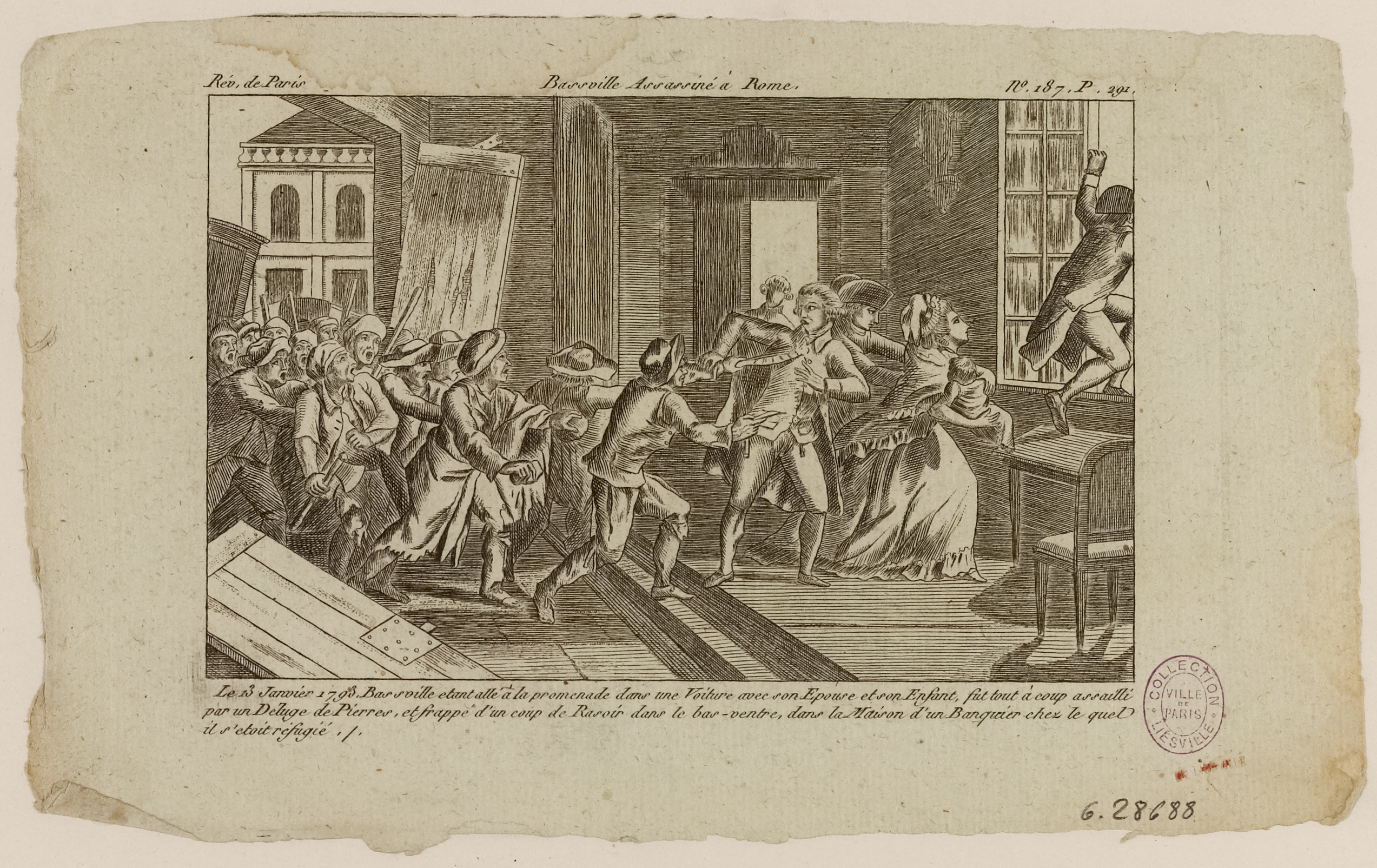
- Bassville's assassination in Rome
- Born: 7 February 1743; Abbeville
- Died: 13 January 1793 (aged 49); Rome, Papal States
- Movement: French Revolution

Nicolas Jean Hugou de Bassville or Basseville (French pronunciation: [nikɔla ʒɑ̃ yɡu də basvil]; 7 February 1743 – 13 January 1793) was a French journalist and diplomat. He was born at Abbéville.

== Biography ==
=== Early life and career ===
Bassville was trained for the priesthood, taught theology in a provincial seminary and then went to Paris. Here in 1784 he published Éléments de mythologie and some poems, which brought him into notice. On the recommendation of the prince of Condé he became tutor to two young Americans travelling in Europe. With them he visited Berlin, made the acquaintance there of Mirabeau, and became a member of the Berlin Royal Academy.

At the outbreak of the Revolution Bassville turned to journalism, becoming editor of the Mercure international. Then, through the Girondist minister Lebrun-Tondu, he entered the diplomatic service, went in May 1792 as secretary of legation to Naples and was shortly afterwards sent, without official status, to Rome.

=== Assignment to Papal States ===
In Rome Bassville acted as the outspoken revolutionary he was, rather than a conventional diplomat. He ordered the fleur-de-lys on the escutcheon of the French embassy to be replaced by a picture of Liberty painted by a French art student, proclaimed himself protector of the radical Jacobins in Rome, and demanded the expulsion of the French émigrés who had taken refuge there, including the "demoiselles Capet" (i.e. members of the French Royal Family).

Bassville talked at large of the "purple geese of the Capitol" - i.e., the Sacred geese of Juno who were told in Roman Mythology to have saved the ancient City of Rome, a story taken up and given a Republican interpretation by French Revolutionaries. He met the remonstrances of Cardinal Zelada, the Papal Secretary of State, with insults. At Basseville's initiative symbols of the new French republican regime replaced those of the former monarchy displayed on the French embassy. The Papal authorities had refused permission for this action and a Roman crowd tore down the new insignia.

=== Murder in Rome ===
His conduct enraged the more conservative elements of the Roman populace, who considered him to have "insulted the Pope". On 13 January 1793 Bassville, together with his wife, young son and a French naval officer Charles de la Flotte, drove by coach to the Via del Corso. Provocatively the open carriage was decorated with republican insignia and a tricolour flag. A hostile Roman crowd pursued the coach when the occupants refused to discard the tricolour cockades in their hats. The alarmed coachman turned his vehicle into a courtyard fronting on the Palazzo Palombasra. Bassville was stoned and stabbed before being carried into a nearby police station. The Bassville family and la Flotte escaped without harm but he himself died of his injuries. Rioting spread beyond the Via del Corso and attacks were made on the French Academy in Rome, the French Post Office and the homes of believed republican sympathisers.

=== Aftermath ===
Although Pius VI had sent his personal physician to attend to the dying Bassville, the affair was magnified in the Convention, being considered "a deliberate murder of the representative of the Republic" by the pope's orders.

In 1797 an article of the treaty of Tolentino compelled the Papal government to pay compensation to Bassville's family.

=== Writings ===
Among his writings is included Mémoires historiques, critiques et politiques sur la Révolution de France (Paris 1790; English trans. London, 1790).
