= Fine Arts Museum of Nantes =

Arts museum in Nantes, France

- Musée d'Arts de Nantes
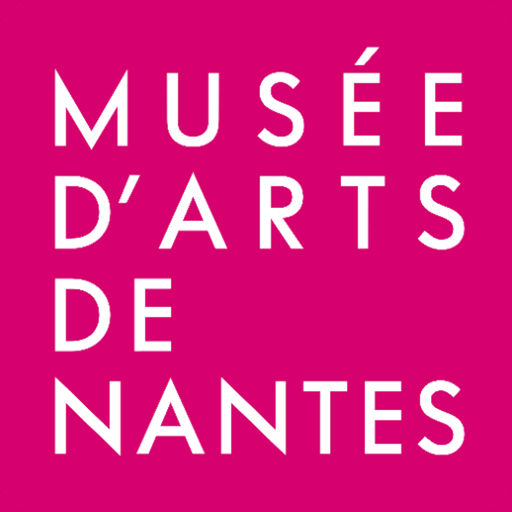

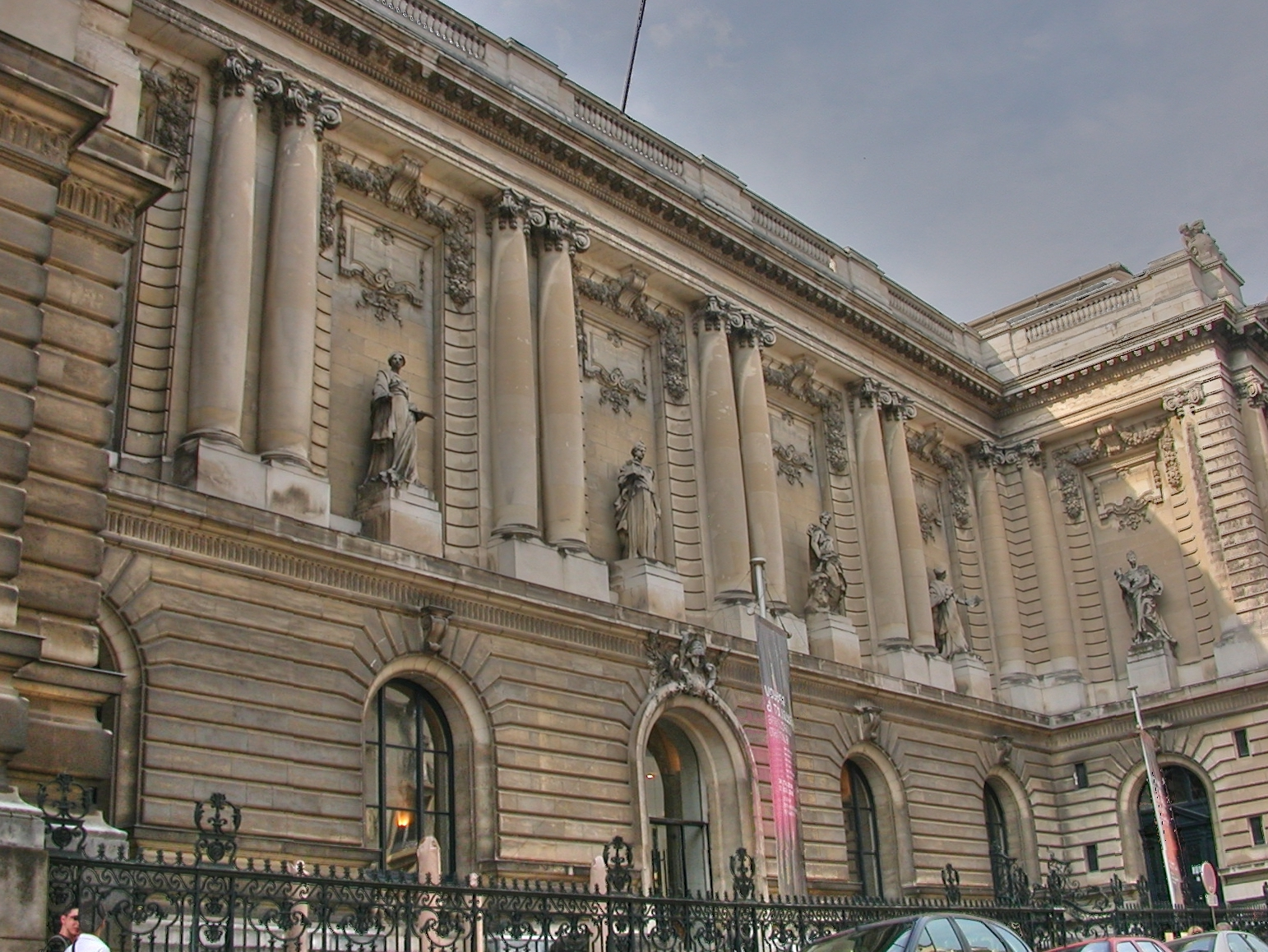
- Musée d'Arts de Nantes
- Interactive fullscreen map
- Established: 1801
- Location: Nantes, France
- Coordinates: 47°13′10″N 1°32′50″W
- Type: Fine arts
- Website: museedartsdenantes.nantesmetropole.fr

The Fine Arts Museum of Nantes (French: Musée d'Arts de Nantes), along with 14 other provincial museums, was created, by consular decree on 14 Fructidor in year IX (31 August 1801). Today the museum is one of the largest museums in the region.

The facades, roof and stairs in the building that houses the art collections have been registered as historical monuments since 29 October 1975.

On 18 December 2011, the museum closed its doors for what was initially expected to be two years at most, to carry out extension expansion work. Due to problems associate with the discovery of ground water in the foundations, which required almost four years of additional work, the reopening of the entire building (renamed the "Art Museum of Nantes") was postponed until 23 June 2017.

== Overview ==
Founded under the Consulate by Napoléon Bonaparte, the Fine Arts Museum of Nantes receives work purchased by state and the central museum deposits (the Louvre). It takes from the 19th century, where it was an important place in the French public collections through the purchase by the city of Nantes in the collection of the brothers Pierre and François Cacault. The fund, with major works, were later supplemented by several other direct or law given gifts, and a purchasing policy supported by the friends of the museum. Compounding this today adds to this rich set of deposits of work of the Regional Contemporary Art Funds of the Loire and the Centre Pompidou.

The museum offers an overview of all the main French and European art movements, which places its collections among the largest public collections of province alongside some of Museums of Fine Arts of Valenciennes, Grenoble, Lyon, Lille and Montpellier.

=== Origins ===
It benefits in 1804 and 1809 to send to the state of 43 paintings taken from the reserves of the Central Museum. These works came from the former royal collection, from churches and convents of Paris of the revolutionary and Napoleonic conquests. But it is the purchase of the collection by the Cacault brothers by the city in 1810 that gives the museum of Nantes its riches and variety. According to an inventory conducted in 1818, the collection Cacault was then the richest collections of painting that existed outside of Paris, since it had 1,155 paintings, 64 sculptures, and 134 collections of prints.

It was not until 1830 that the collections were presented to the public on the floor of the hall with paintings (located on the street of Feltre to the sight of the old market of Feltre) This space quickly proved to be too small. In 1891, the city decided to build a designed to preserve and present them to the public in good conditions. A square plot near the school and the botanical garden, is chosen to host the future Palace of Fine Arts. The project was in the public competition as the “museum of paintings and sculptures.”

=== Architecture ===
==== Building from 1893 ====
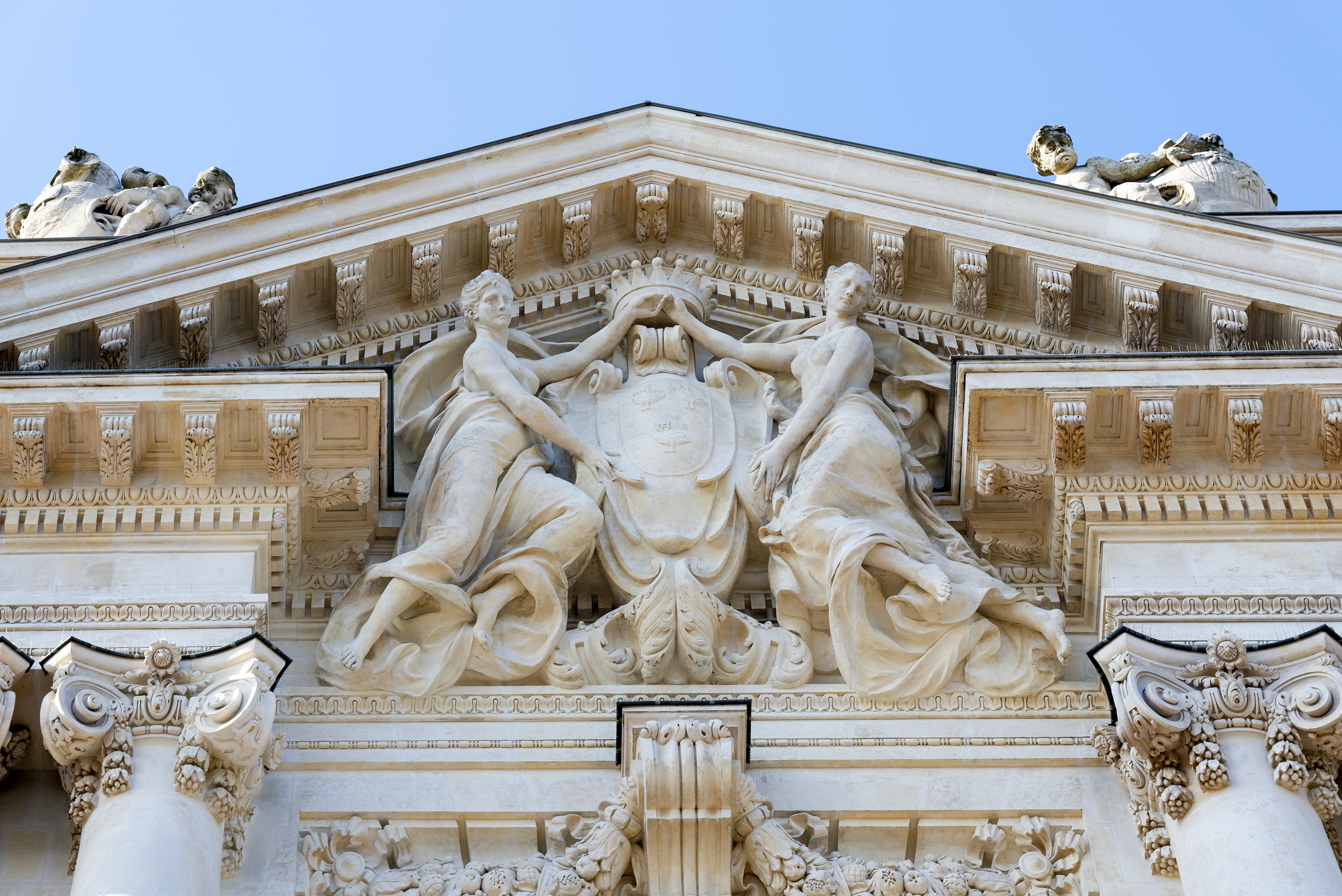
Façade of the Musée d'Arts in Nantes.

The winner, the original Nantes architect Clement-Marie Josso, designed the plans for Palace of Fine Arts according to the principles of recent museums of Lille and Amiens. The plan was organized around a central courtyard covered with a glass roof. A dual circuit galleries and room surrounded it on two levels behind a monumental double staircase and a vaulted vestibule. The rooms on the bottom floor are lit by large windows, those on the floor have a modern overhead lighting made possible by the metal frame of the whole.

The architectural eclecticism meets the triumph of architects at the Universal Exhibition of 1900 (inauguration year of the museum) and take their revenge on the engineers of the 1889. The small hole between the Ionic columns hold art allegories and architecture in the middle on top of the entry door.

This monument of the late 19th century, the museum was able to fit the chronological presentation of enriched collections. Meanwhile, an ambitious temporary exhibition allows the spread of heritage and contemporary creation. From 1985 to 1990, the building also housed the bulk of the funds from municipal library of the city before it was finally installed in the new Jacques Demy-media library which was located on the Quai de la Fosse.

==== Future Museum of Arts ====
In 2011, the museum was closed for a planned maximum period of 2 years to make major expansion work to increase its area to 17,000 m^{2}, versus 11,400 m^{2}, and to enclosed the chapel of the Oratory (serving as a place of temporary exhibitions for the museum) nearby, constructing new buildings according to the plans of the architect, British Stanton Williams, instead of commercial constructions. This work includes: the expansion of 2,500 m^{2} for exhibition area (mainly dedicated to contemporary art), the development of an auditorium of 180 seats in the patio, improving access to the entire building, the glass roofs have been completely renovated, with the aim of using natural light; and the reception staff to more appropriate premises. However, the discovery of significant water pipes at the construction site delayed progress, forcing architects to change their plans and adding an additional cost of 10 million euros. For all the exhibition spaces, the museum fully reopened on the 23rd of June 2017.

As a result of the transformation of the urban community in the metropolis, the museum became the Metropolitan on 1 January 2015.

==== During Jules Dupré ====
Location: 47 ° 13 '10 "N 1 ° 32' 52" W

Jules-Dupré course is a paved road that connects Georges Clemenceau St. to Gambetta St. along the west side of the museum. The entry is from the beginning, limited by gates at each end to allow exclusive use by the museum.

Its name, decided in 1899, is a tribute to the painter Jules Dupré (1811–1889.)

The boundary of the protected area of Nantes goes through the middle of the road. The Fine Arts Museum is not part of the protected area.

== Collection ==
Artworks in the collection include paintings from the 13th century to the modern art period, such as:

=== Ancient painting (13th century to 18th century) ===
- Abraham Bloemaert
- Ambrogio Borgognone
- Jan Brueghel the Elder
- Philippe de Champaigne
- Pieter Claesz
- Bernardo Daddi
- Orazio Gentileschi
- Luca Giordano
- Gerard van Honthorst
- Charles de La Fosse
- Georges de La Tour: 3 paintings
- Peter Lely
- Giovanni Battista Moroni
- Perugino
- Guido Reni
- Peter Paul Rubens
- Andrea Solario
- Tintoretto
- Cosme Tura
- Virginia Vezzi
- Simon Vouet
- Antoine Watteau

=== 19th-century and 20th-century painting and sculpture ===
- Jules Benoit-Lévy
- Eugène Boudin
- Edward Burne-Jones
- Camille Corot
- Courbet: The Wheat Sifters
- Édouard Joseph Dantan
- Delacroix
- Sonia Delaunay
- Maurice Denis
- Kees van Dongen
- Jean Dubuffet
- Georges Dufrénoy
- Raoul Dufy
- Max Ernst
- Jean Auguste Dominique Ingres
- Wassily Kandinsky: 11 paintings including Herunter
- Fernand Léger
- Albert Marquet
- Claude Monet
- Giuseppe Penone
- Pablo Picasso
- Pierre-Auguste Renoir
- Théodore Rousseau
- Georges Seurat
- Paul Signac
- Alfred Sisley
- Horace Vernet
- Herbert Ward

== Gallery ==
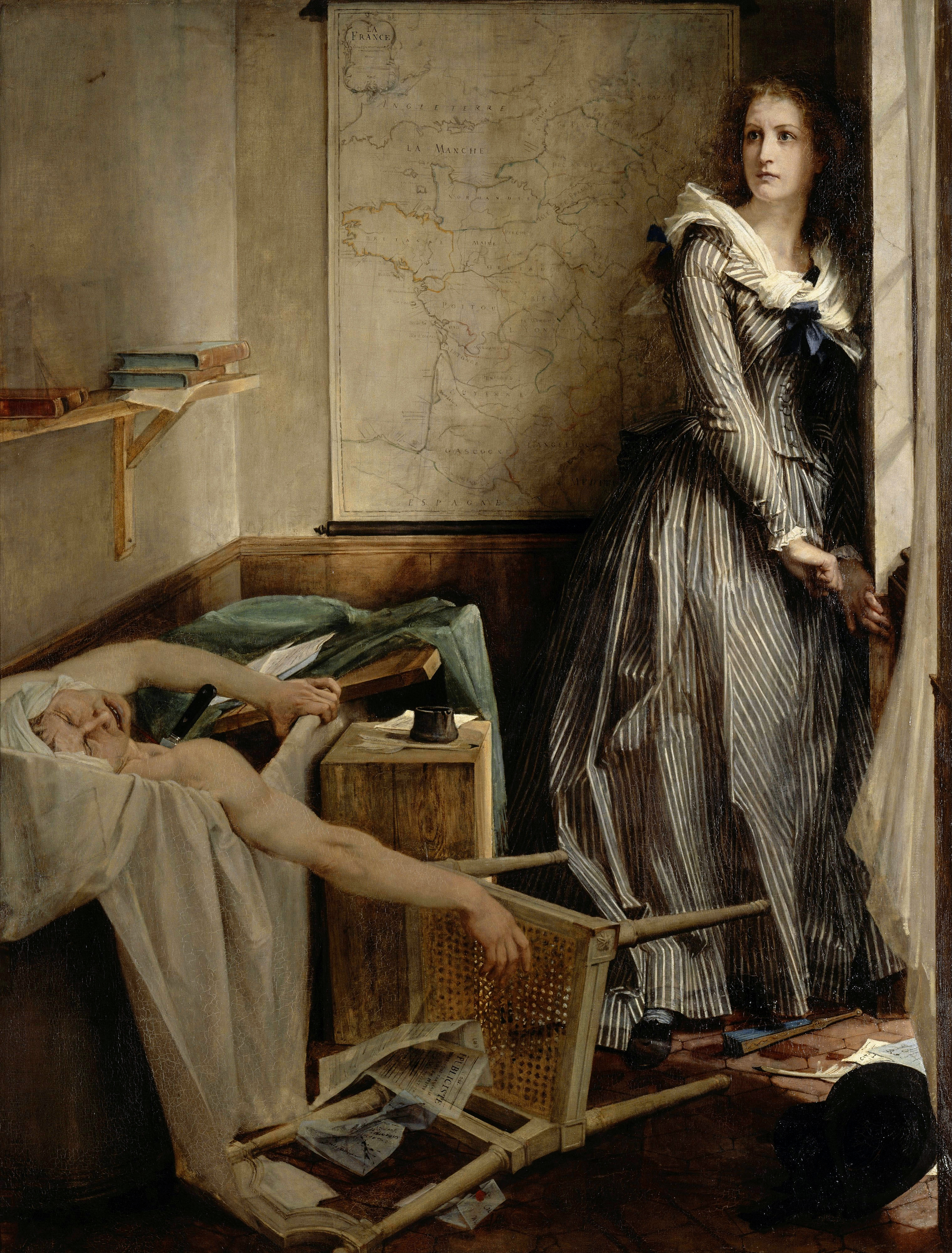
Charlotte Corday (1860) by Paul Baudry

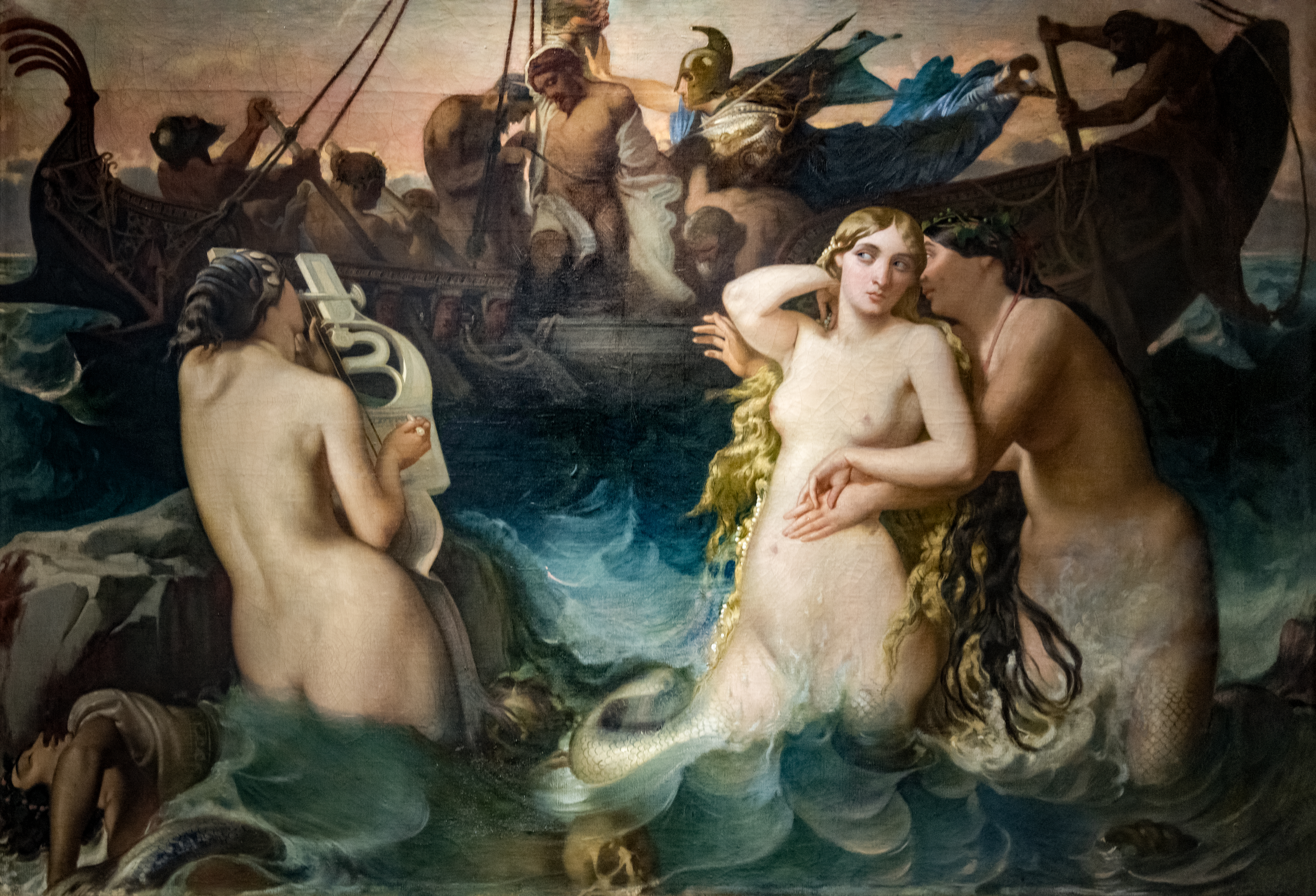
Ulysse et les sirènes (before 1848) by Victor Mottez

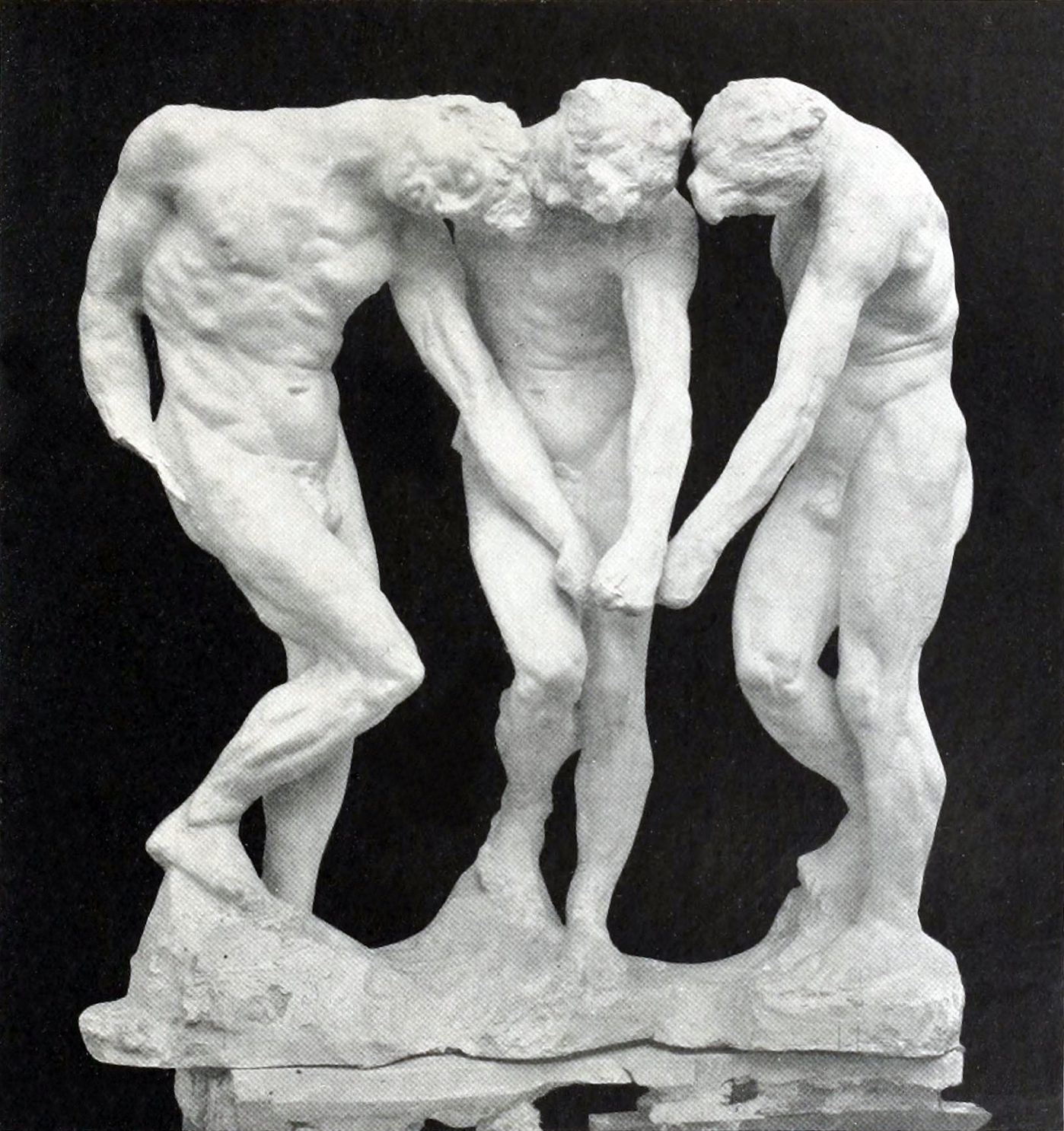
"The Three Shades" (1886) by Auguste Rodin

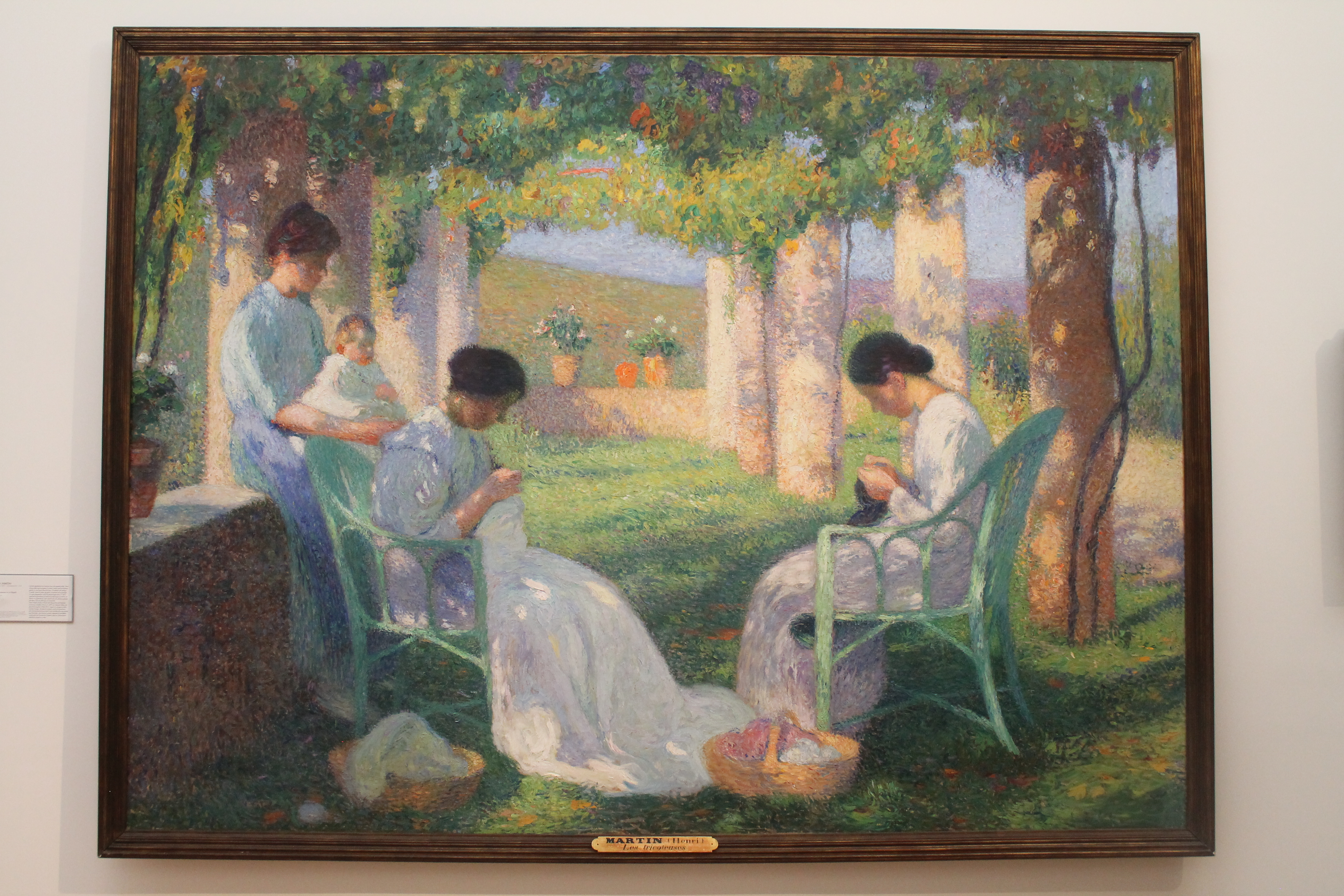
"Les Tricoteuses ou La Pergola" (1913) by Henri Martin.
