= François Cacault =

French diplomat

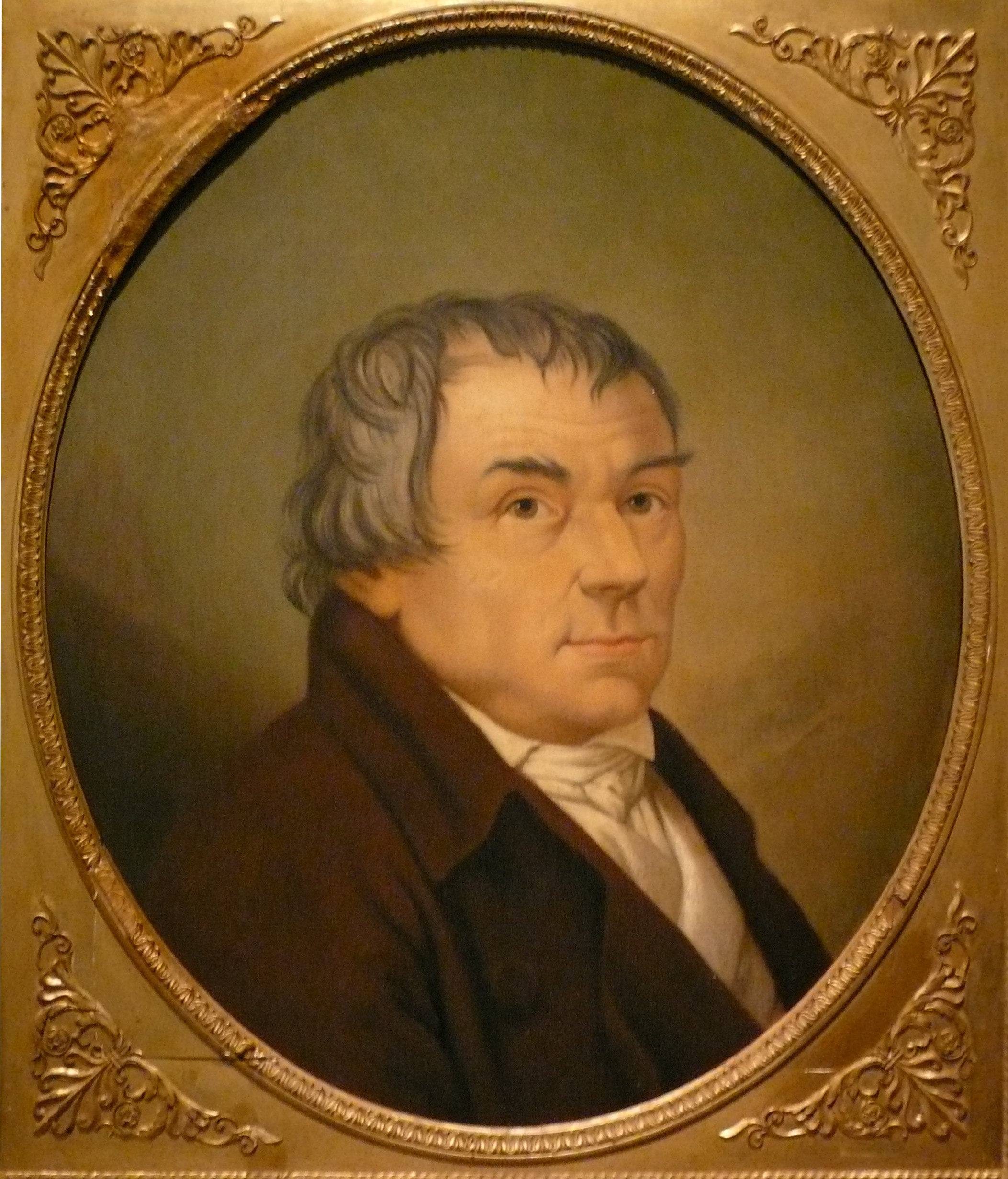
François Cacault; illustration from Le Magasin pittoresque

François Cacault (1742, Nantes – 10 October 1805, Clisson) was a French diplomat of the Revolutionary and Napoleonic periods.

== Life ==
François's father was a master artist in faience, road engineer and designer of a 1775 map of Nantes which served as the basis for plans to embellish the town. François began his career by training at the Ecole militaire in Paris, where he was made professor of fortifications in 1764 and inspector of studies in 1766. He resigned in 1769 and, forced into exile following a duel, travelled around Europe and got to know its artistic and literary circles. In 1775 he became the secretary of marshal d'Aubeterre, governor of Brittany, following him to Italy in 1785. Also in 1785 he began his diplomatic career as secretary to Talleyrand, then ambassador to the court of the Kingdom of the Two Sicilies in Naples. In 1788 and 1791, he took on the duties of a chargé d'affaires but was recalled to France due to his meetings with anti-revolutionary émigrés. In 1793, he was sent out as France's ambassador to the Holy See but was forced by the riots of that year to sell all the lands and goods of French foundations in Rome, forcing the closure of the Académie de France there and the repatriation of its French artists. However, also in 1793, he managed to detach Tuscany from the First Coalition against France. In 1796 Cacault became French minister in Rome to oversee the implementation of the Armistice of Bologna.

On 10 February 1797 he was the second French signatory of the Treaty of Tolentino, at Bonaparte's side as French chargé d'affaires in Italy. On 27 germinal year VI (16 April 1798), he was elected as député for Loire-Inférieure to the Council of Five Hundred. After the 18 brumaire coup d'état, Cacault rallied to Napoleon and on 4 nivôse year VIII (25 December 1799) entered the Corps législatif as député for Loire-Inférieure. He was then one of the negotiators for the Concordat of 1801. From year IX (1802) to year XI (1804) he was minister plenipotentiary in Rome, before joining the Sénat conservateur on 6 germinal year XII (27 March 1804).

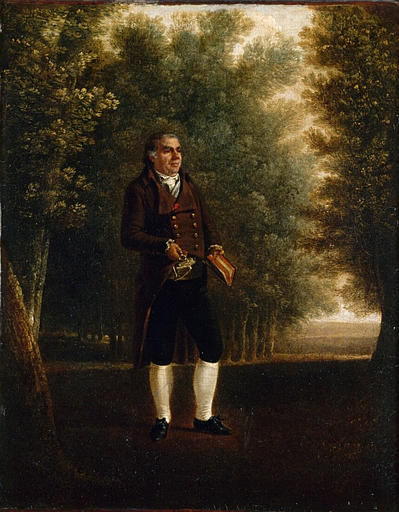
Portrait by Jean-François Sablet

A friend of letters and the arts, he translated many German works into French. During his stay in Italy he bought sculptures, more than a thousand paintings and over 5,000 prints, representative of Western European art from the end of the 13th century to the start of the 19th century. Conditions were highly favourable for this collection's formation, and Cacault was probably advised by the painter-collector Jean-Baptiste Wicar. They were both present in the art market, notably with the "brocanteur" or market-dealer Corazetto in piazza Navona and amidst works seized from churches and convents by the French occupiers and the suppression between 1798 and 1802 of a ban on exporting works of art from the Papal States. François's younger brother Pierre had stayed in Clisson since 1796, and there they founded a museum that aimed to display François's collection, to contribute to the spread of good taste and beauty and to favour arts studies. This "museum-school" arose from a passion for art and witnesses to the political context which affirmed the will to make all works of art accessible, within an ideal of artistic education. The Cacault collection was bought in 1801 by the town of Nantes, forming the foundation of the Musée des Beaux-Arts de Nantes.

== External links and sources ==
- (in French) The life of François Cacault
- (in French) Biography
- (in French) Saint-Georges, H. (1858). Notice historique sur le musée de peinture de Nantes d'après des documents officiels et inédits. Guéraud. p. 35.
