= The Musicians' Brawl =

Painting by Georges de La Tour

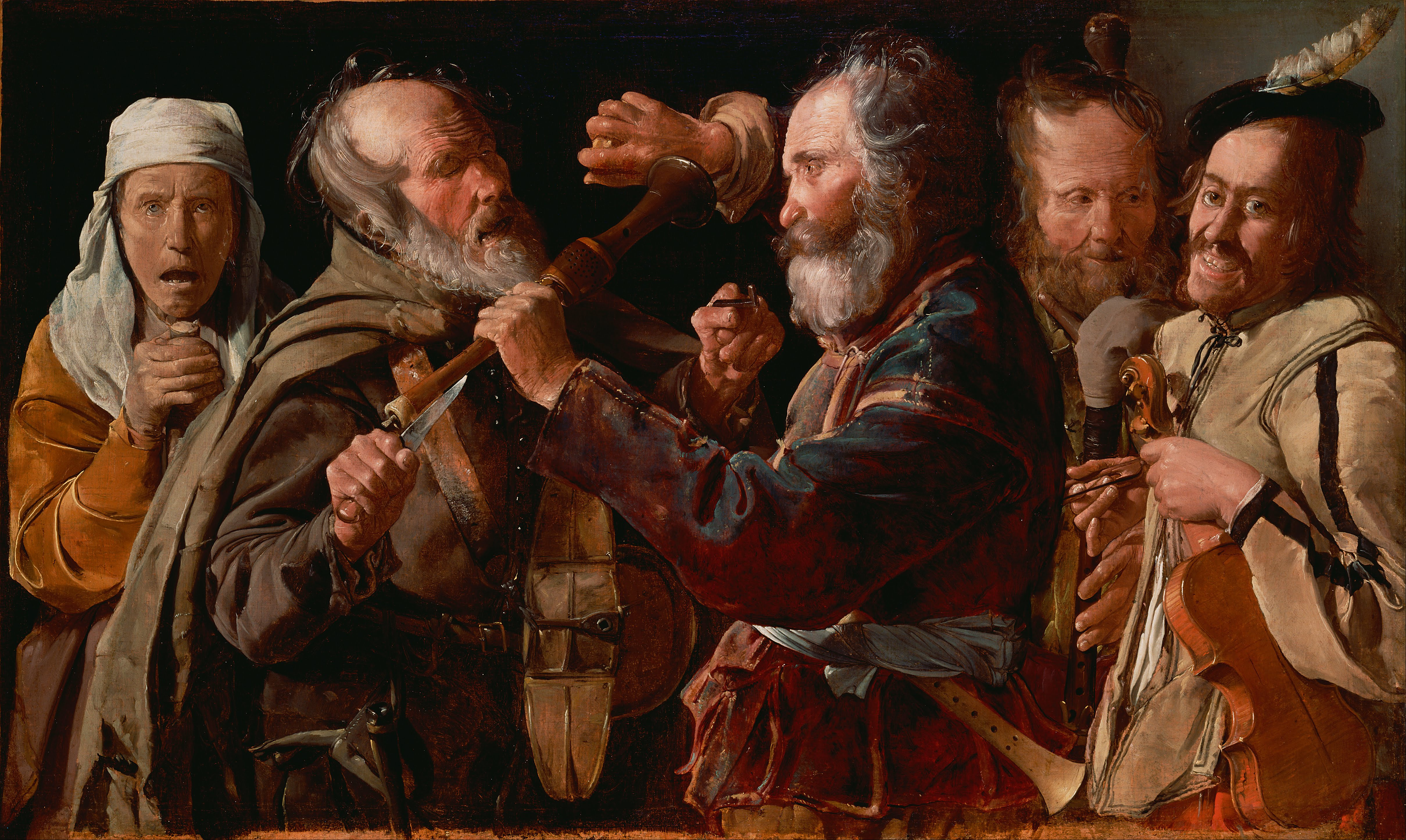
- Artist: Georges de La Tour
- Year: ca. 1620–1630
- Medium: Oil on canvas
- Dimensions: 94 cm × 141 cm (37 in × 56 in)
- Location: J. Paul Getty Museum, Los Angeles

The Musicians' Brawl is an oil-on-canvas painting by the French artist Georges de La Tour, produced at an unknown date between 1620 and 1630. Previously attributed to Caravaggio, the work was in Lord Trevor's collection by 1928. It was reattributed to de la Tour in 1958 by Charles Sterling and Francois-Georges Pariset and sold in 1972. Its present owner, the Getty Museum, acquired it in 1973. The painting depicts two street musicians fighting as two other musicians and a woman watch.
