= Paul Trouillebert =

French painter

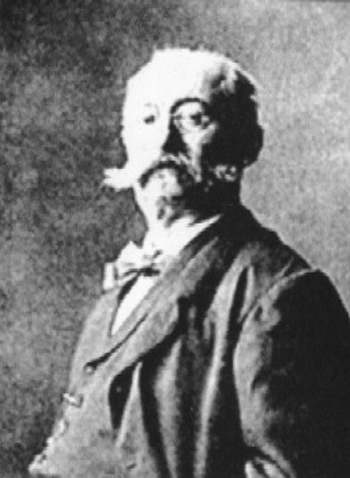
- Paul Trouillebert, circa 1895
- Born: Paul Désiré Trouillebert; 1831; Paris, France
- Died: 28 June 1900 (aged 68–69); Ebenda
- Education: Ernest Hébert and Charles Jalabert
- Known for: Painter
- Movement: Barbizon School; Orientalism; Genre painting

Paul Désiré Trouillebert (French: [pɔl tʁujbɛʁ]; 1829 in Paris, France – 28 June 1900 in Paris, France) was a prominent French Barbizon School painter of the mid to late nineteenth century, with works in a wide range of museums and public collections, including the Musée d'Orsay, the Hermitage Museum, and The Metropolitan Museum of Art. Trouillebert was a prolific artist, with over 1200 works included in the authoritative Marumo-Maier-Müllerschön Catalogue Raisonné of painted works (published in 2004), with more having been identified and added to the Maier-Müllerschön online supplement to the catalogue since 2004. While the majority of the catalogued works are landscapes, many portraits and orientalist genre pictures are included as well.

== Life and career ==
Trouillebert is considered a portrait, and a genre and landscape painter from the French Barbizon School. He was a student of Ernest Hébert (1817–1908) and Charles Jalabert (1819–1901). He made his debut at the Salon of 1865, at the age of 36, and between 1865 and 1872, he exhibited at least one portrait at the Salon.

By the 1860s, his interests were shifting towards landscape painting.

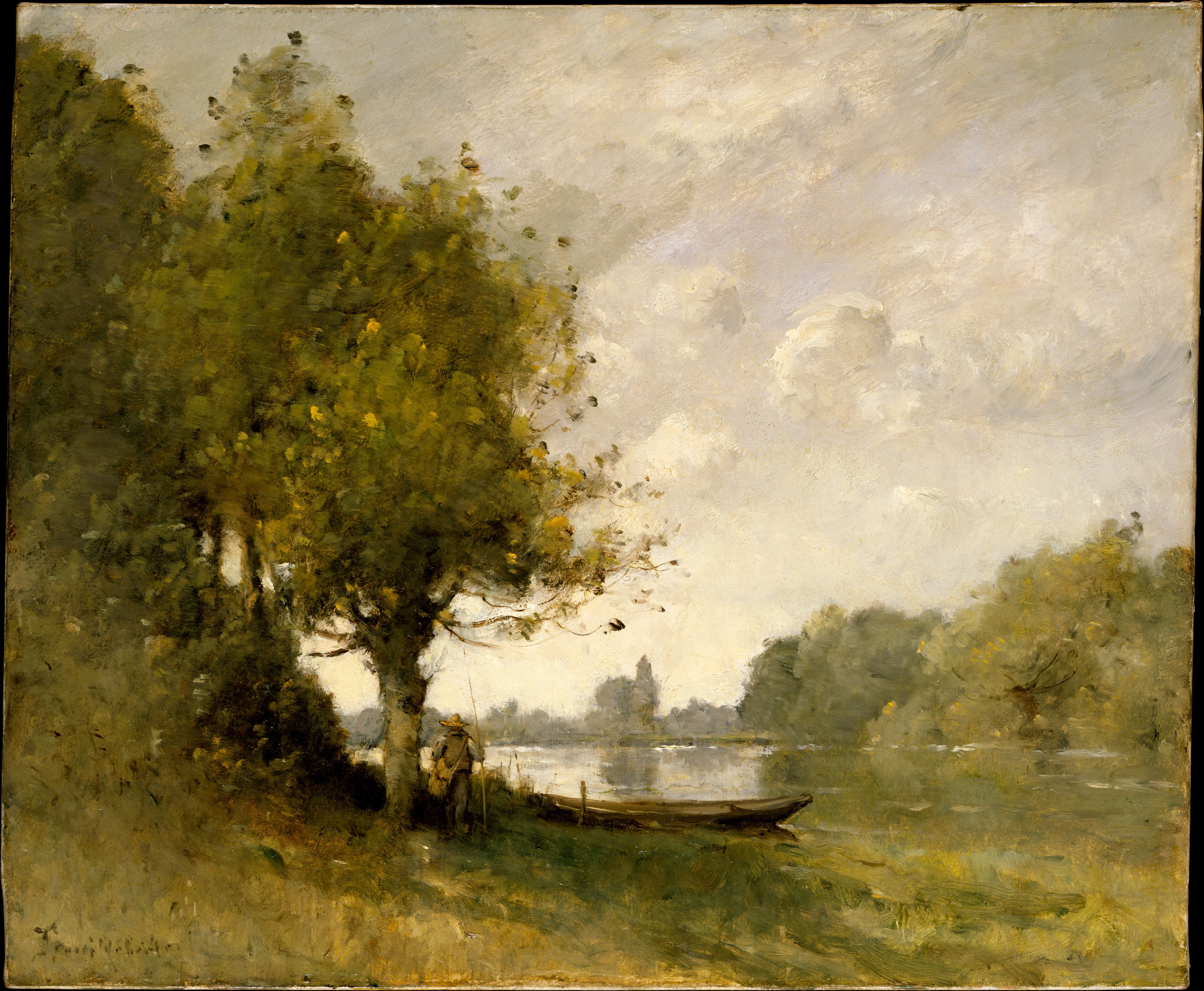
A Pond Near Nangis, 1880-95 Metropolitan Museum of Art

At the Salon of 1869, he exhibited Au Bois Rossignolet, a landscape painting that was more aligned with his interest in landscapes and received critical acclaim for it. He went on to execute many landscapes that are very close to Corot's late manner of painting. Indeed, the artist received added attention when one of his landscapes was sold to Alexandre Dumas’s son as a work by Corot in a celebrated forgery incident. In order to increase the sale value of the work, Trouillebert's signature had been erased and replaced with Corot's signature. In reality, while Trouillebert's landscapes are very similar to Corot, they exhibit their own distinct style.

Trouillebert never confined himself to any single genre. He was a skilled at portraits, landscapes, still-lifes and other subject matter. He was also interested in Orientalist themes and produced paintings of Eastern nudes. He painted a portrait of a half-nude young woman in an ancient Egyptian style of the Greco-Roman Dynasty. He called it Servante du harem (The Harem Servant Girl), now in the collection of the Musée des Beaux-Arts de Nice. In 1884, his painting of nudes, The Bathers was well received by the Paris Salon.

=== Artistic legacy ===
The French art historian René Édouard-Joseph, in his Dictionnaire Biographique des Artistes Contemporains: 1910-1930, summed up Trouillebert's legacy:

'The greatest merit of Trouillebert is to be a complete painter; he never confined himself to a genre: he was also just as skilful at bringing to life the flesh of a woman as painting bright and hazy landscapes, of the banks of the Loire or the Oise with the soft aspects of the trees, of spring mornings, of portraits or of still lifes of a true realism. His oeuvre which was considerable, conserves a tonality that is its own, an incontestable originality and a strong personality which differentiates it from Corot…and which assures him one of the greatest places, even if it isn’t the first among the contemporary landscape painters.'

=== Calling card pictures ===
At some point in his mature career, Trouillebert had a habit of creating small still-life pictures featuring a bouquet of violets (a common symbol for faithfulness or love, which enjoyed a faddish popularity in the mid to late-19th century), and one of his own calling cards, or "cartes de visite", as gifts for patrons or friends.

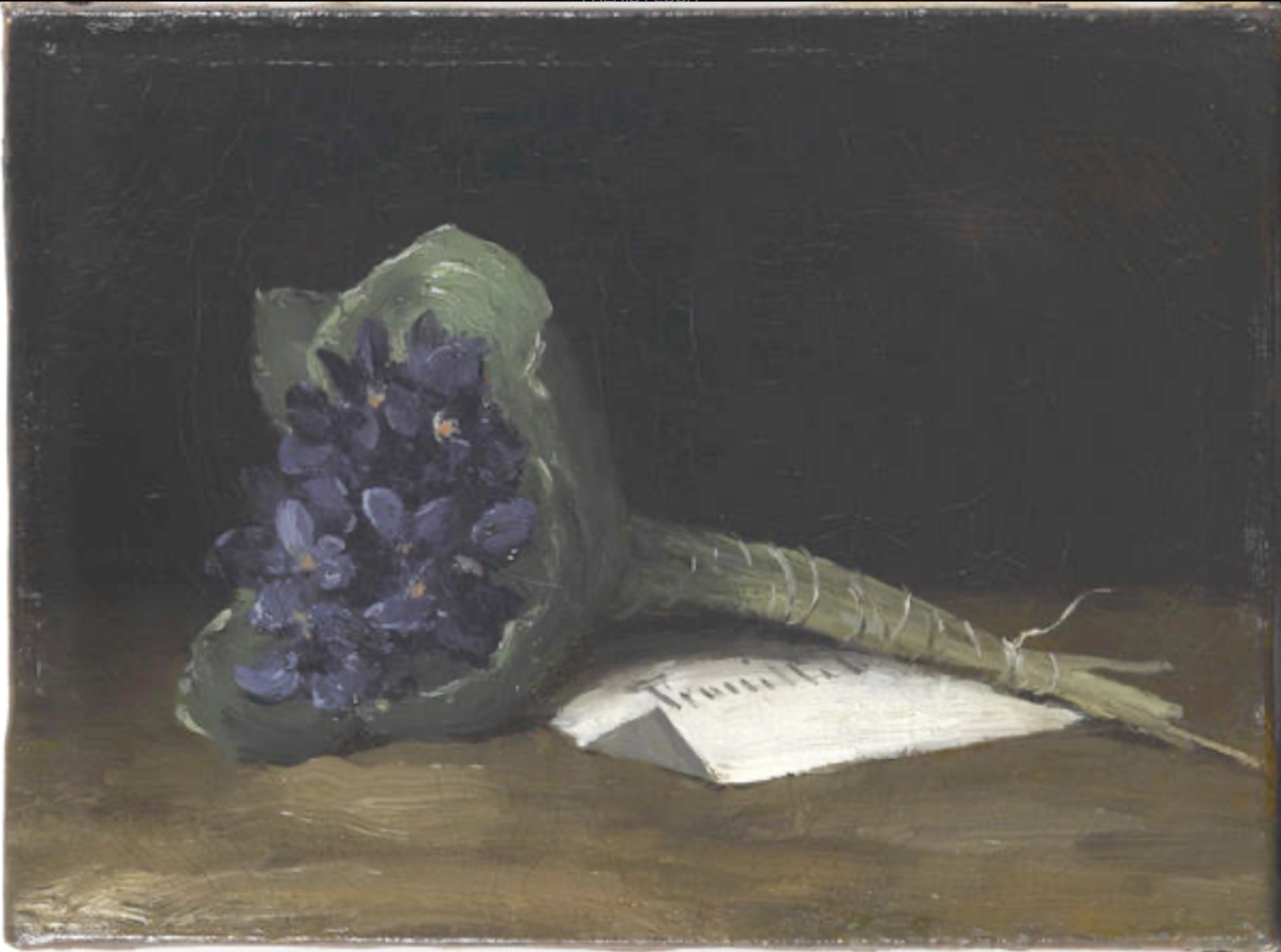
Bouquet of Violets With a Calling Card, c. 1880, Musée Fesch, Ajaccio, France

Of the 22 currently-known examples, 14 are documented in the Marumo-Maier-Müllerschön Catalogue Raisonné, one of which is in the collection of the Musée Fesch in Ajaccio, France. Three more are documented in the Maier-Müllerschön online supplement to the catalogue raisonné (one of which was formerly in the collection of the Baudet family of Amiens, patrons of Trouillebert); one was sold at auction in 2025 by Schuler Auktionen, Zurich (to be added to the online catalogue); one was seen in 2026 in the Provençe antiques trade; and one more is in the private Ucciani collection.

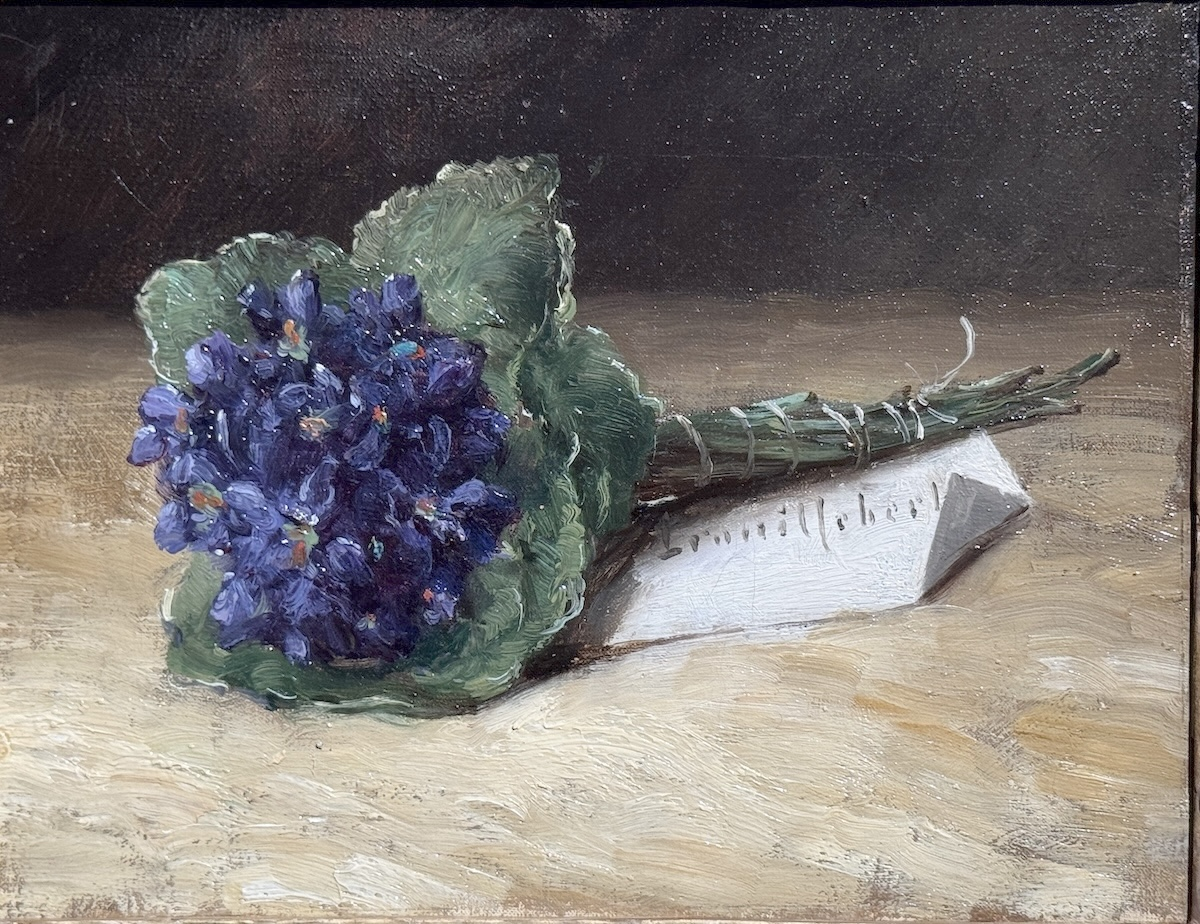
Bouquet de Violettes Aves Une Carte de Visite, c. 1880, Private collection

There was likely a Victorian-era convention at work in the way that all the calling cards in the pictures are intentionally folded, which corner having been folded conveying a coded social message. The conventions at the time could vary by region or over time, but were generally:

Top Right Corner Folded: A personal visit made in person (not by a servant).

Top Left Corner Folded: Congratulations or felicitations.

Bottom Left Corner Folded: Condolences or sympathy.

Bottom Right Corner Folded: Taking leave, often for a long journey (P.P.C. - pour prendre congé).

No Fold: Delivered by a servant, indicating the sender did not call personally.

Based on this code, 18 of the extant versions of the pictures depict bottom right folds (taking leave), and four depict bottom right folds (condolences), including the Musée Fesch version and the picture in the Ucciani collection. One could speculate that the latter picture was sent by Trouillebert to Pierre Ucciani's wife as a gesture of condolence on the dissolution of her marriage to her philandering husband (who was a painter and a student of Trouillebert) - the date of that breakup would have been in the mid-1890s.

=== Posthumous exhibition ===
Prior to his death, Trouillebert pre-arranged a posthumous exhibition and sale of a collection of his works that were still in his possession, which took place in 1901 at the Galerie des Artistes Modernes, Paris, from March 18–30. The artist's friend Charles Chincholle wrote a forward to the catalogue, in which he noted the artist's habit of retaining some works for his own collection and sometimes making additional, personal versions of pictures to keep for himself:

'"What should matter to a painter," he often said, "is to paint." And, when he had painted more than the canvas intended for his friend, he would hasten to back, like an old collector, to hide in a drawer where he had no access, the second painting of which he was particularly fond.'

== Bibliography ==
- Claude Marumo, Thomas Maier et Bernd Mullerschon, Paul Désiré Trouillebert (1831–1900), [catalogue raisonné], Stuttgart, 2004, 635 p., 1 200 ill. (ISBN 3-935252-02-1).

== Selected works ==
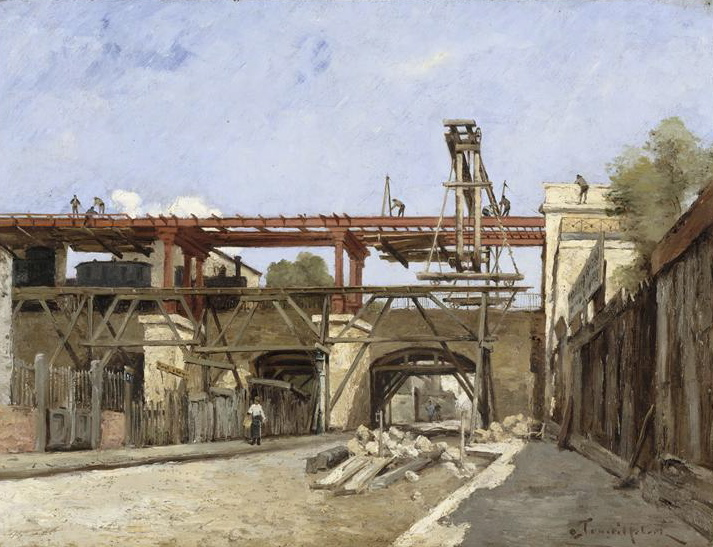
Les Travaux de relèvement du chemin de fer de ceinture, le pont de la rue de la Voûte, 1888 Musée d'Orsay

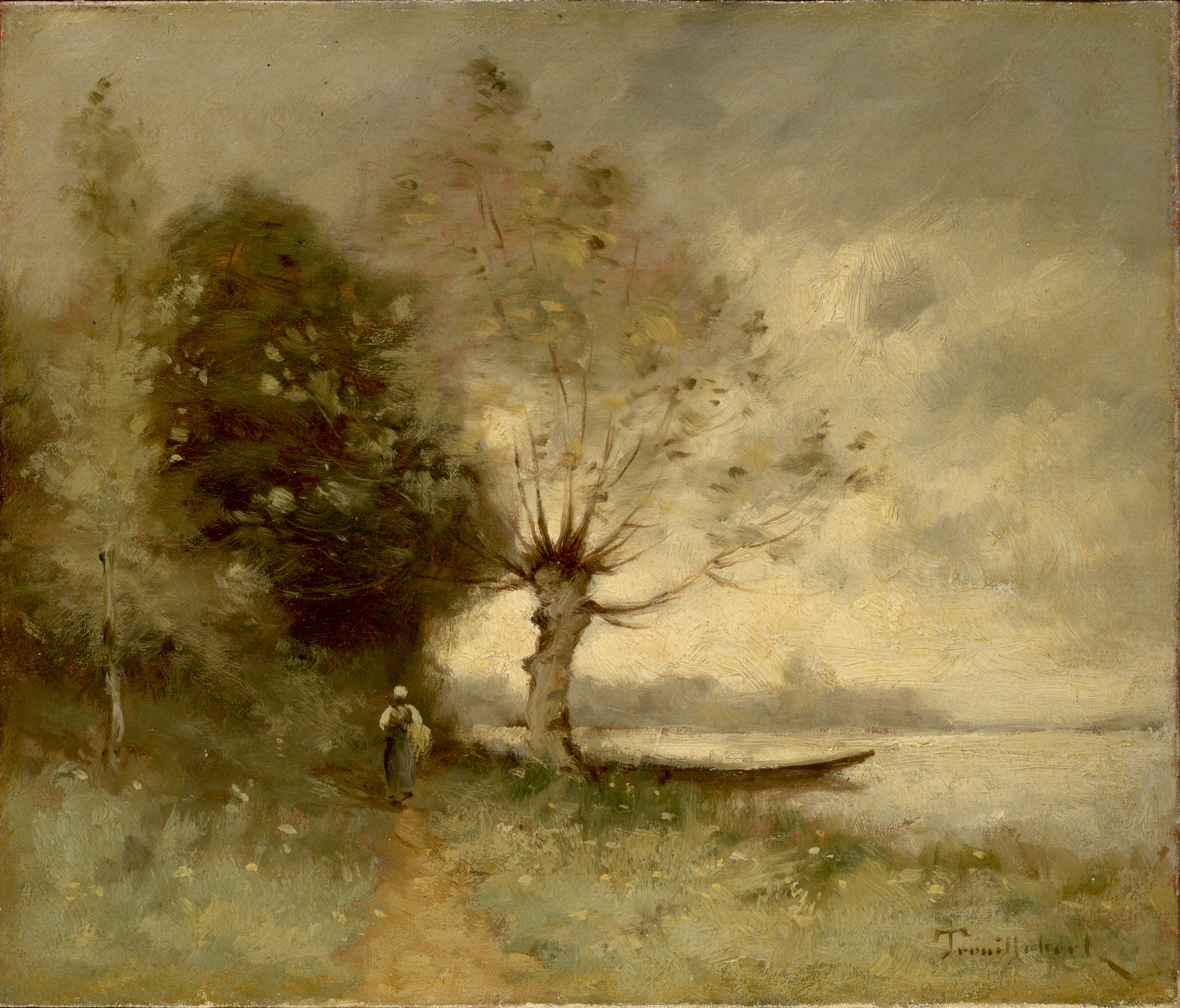
Bank of the Loire Near Chouze, 1893, Hermitage Museum

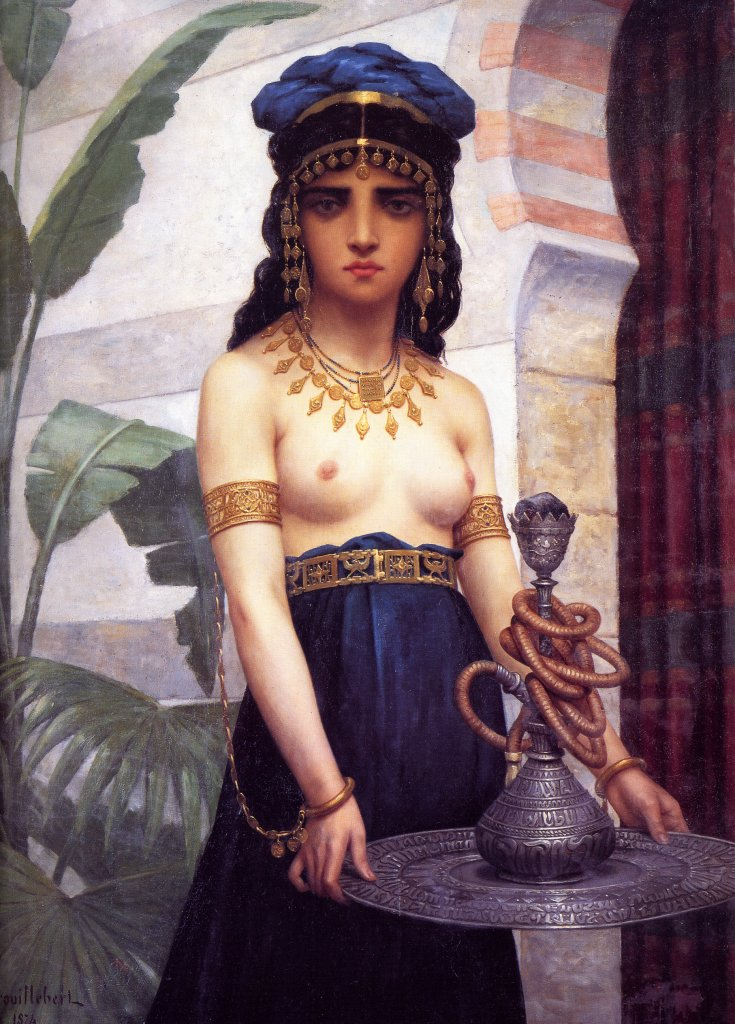
The Harem Servant Girl, 1874 Musée des Beaux-Arts de Nice

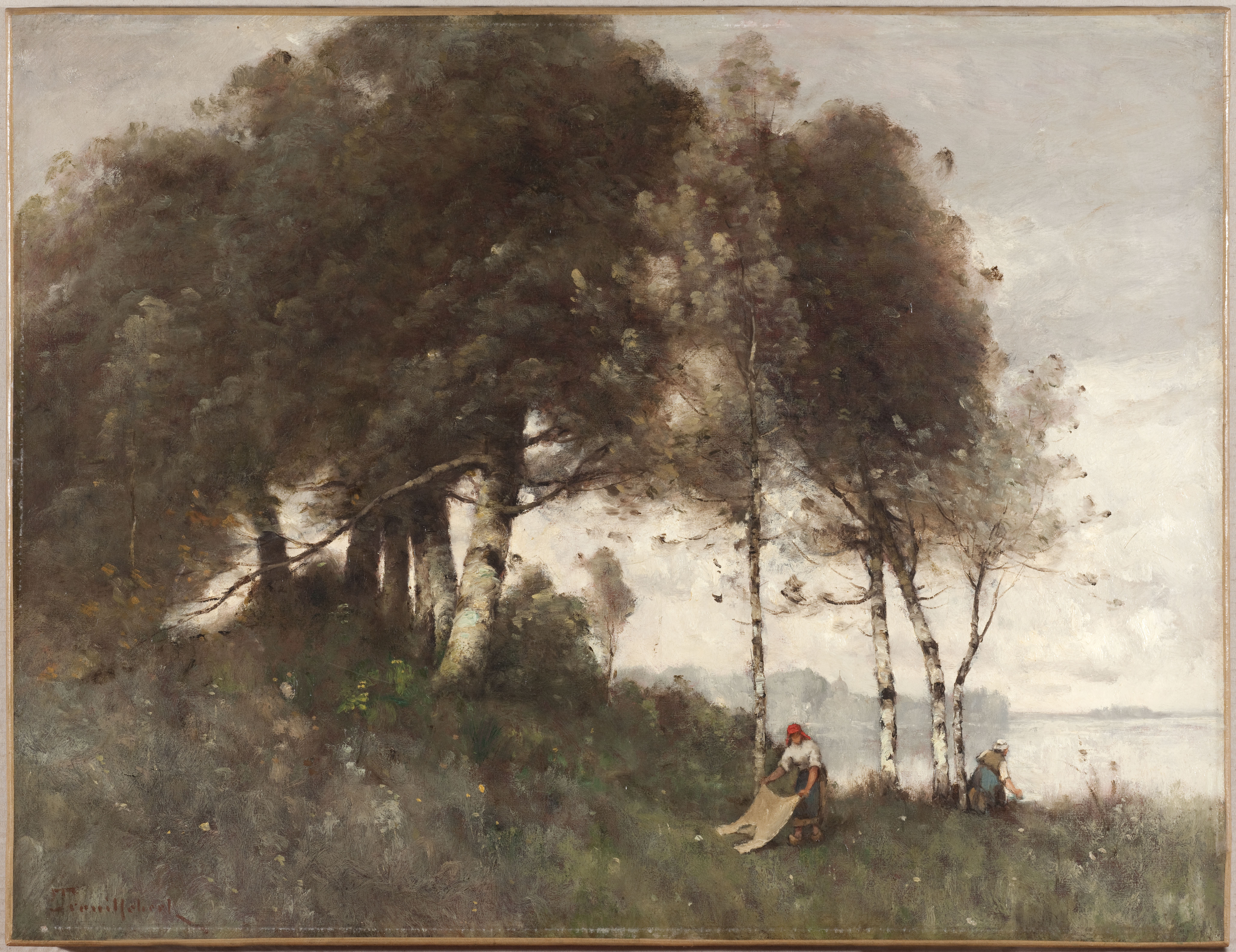
Paysage aux Lavandieres, after 1807, Petit Palais, Paris

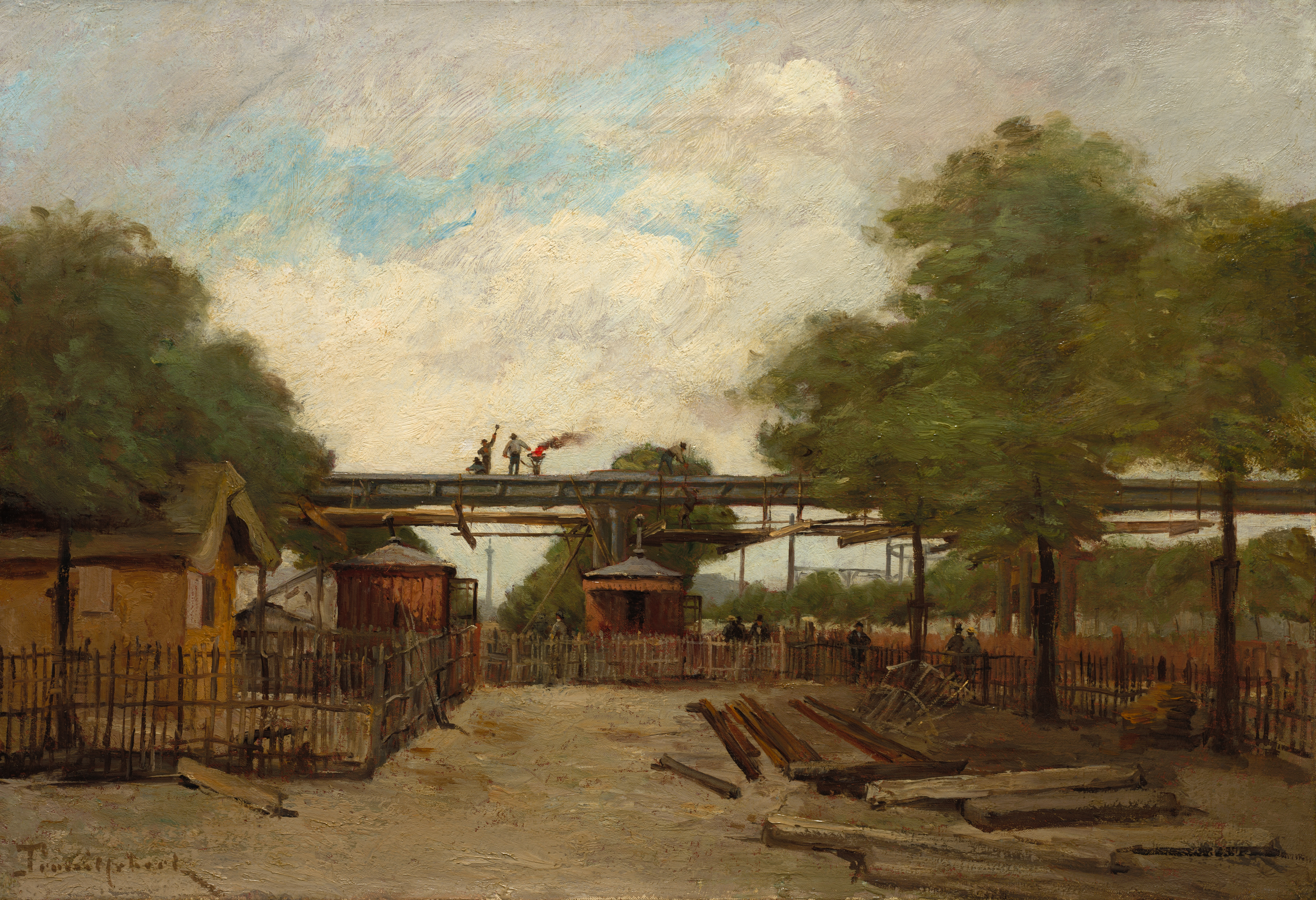
Construction of an Elevated Railway, Bridge over the Cours de Vincennes, 1888 Cleveland Museum of Art

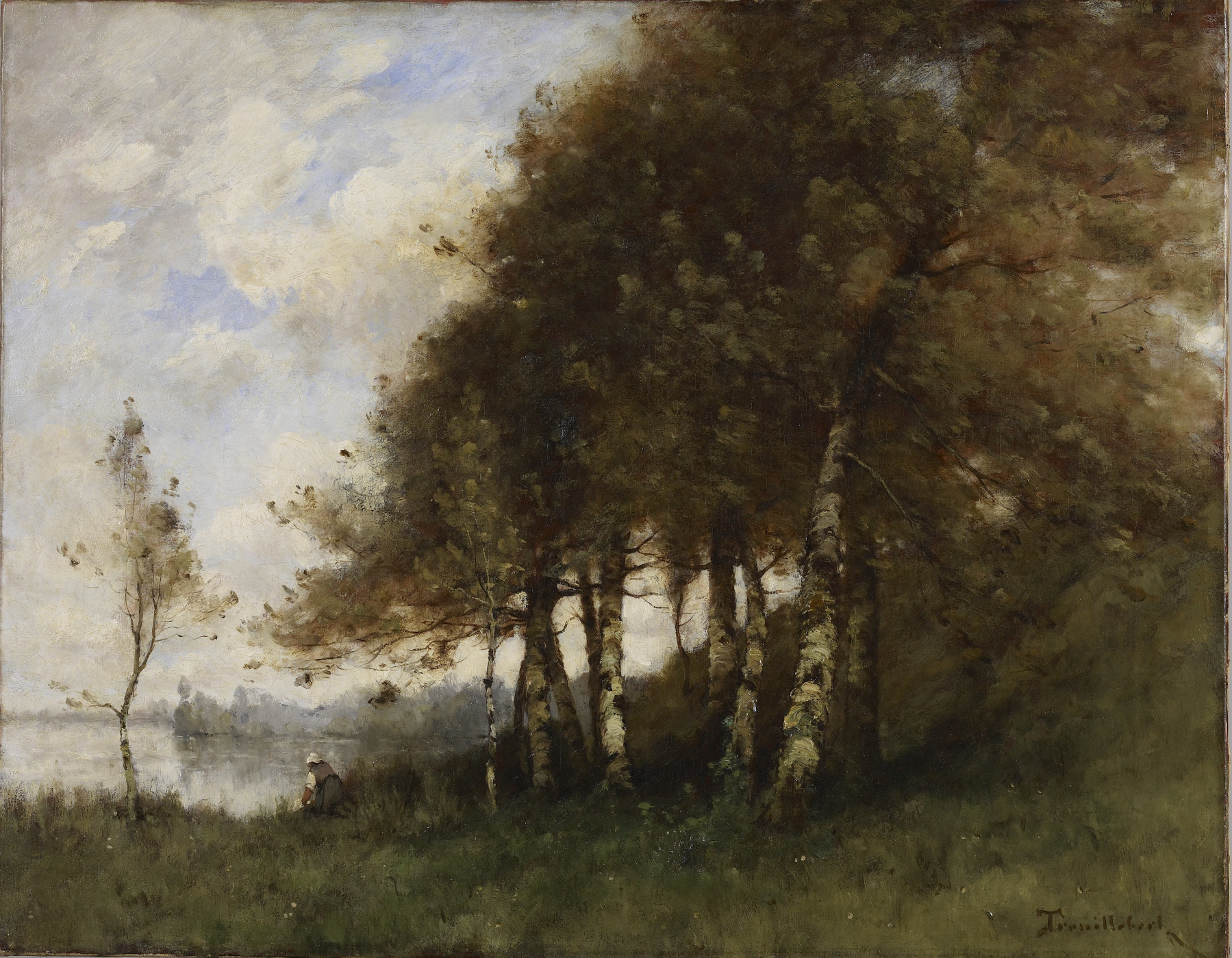
Landscape Walters Art Museum, Baltimore

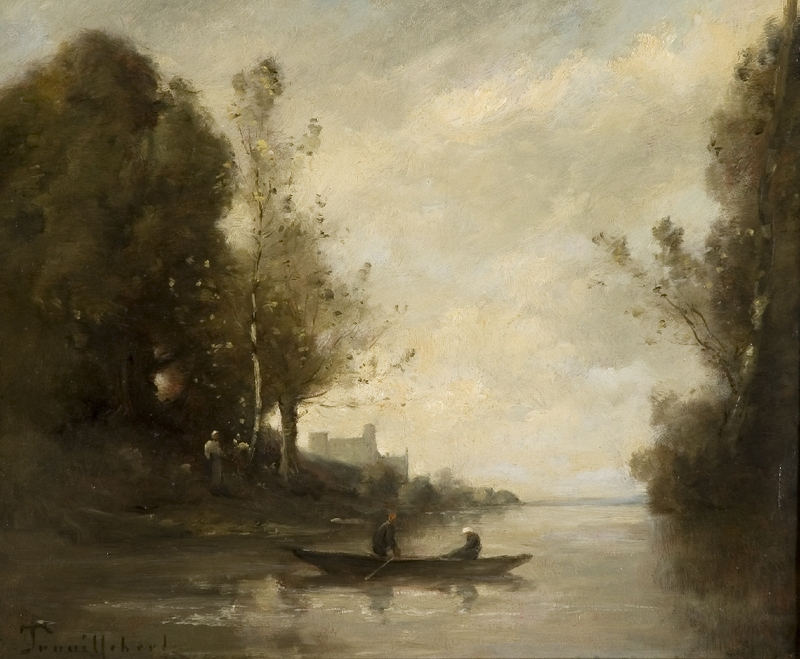
A quiet backwater (between 1883 and 1889), Beecroft Art Gallery, Southend-on-Sea, England

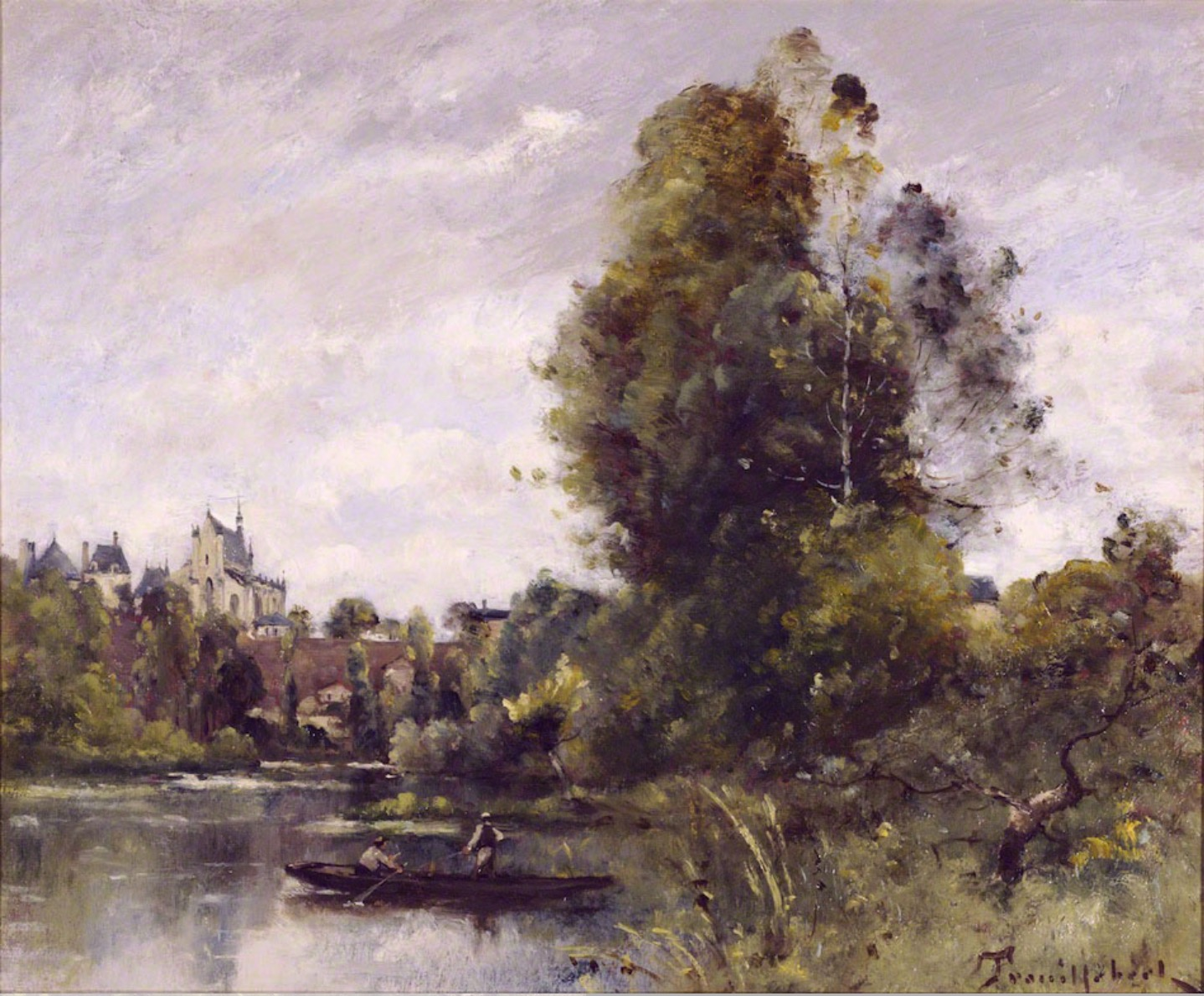
Fishing Boat, Tokyo Fuji Art Museum, Japan
- Still Life With Plums, Norton Simon Museum, Pasadena
- Cleopatra & the Dying Messenger, Lightner Museum, St. Augustine, Florida, 1873.
- Bord De Rivière, Musée Fabre, Montpellier
- Femme en robe bleue rêvant. Private collection
- Chemin au bord du lac de Nantua, Galerie Gary-Roche
- Deux lavanderies sous les bouleaux, Van Ham Fine Art Auctions (Van Ham Kunstauktionen)
- La Gardienne de Troupeau, Frances Aronson Fine Art, LLC
- Le Loir et la Flêche, Stoppenbach & Delestre
- Le Pêcheur et le Bateau, Daphne Alazraki
- Mme. Trouillebert, The Darvish Collection, Inc.
- Au Bord de La Loire à Montsoreau
- Diana Chasseresse (Diana the Huntress), private collection.
