= Claude Marumo =

French art dealer and gallerist

- Born: 18 November 1928; 9th arrondissement of Paris, France
- Died: 22 March 2017 (aged 88); West Palm Beach, Florida, USA
- Burial place: Saint-Ouen Cemetery, Saint-Ouen-sur-Seine, France
- Occupations: Art dealer, gallerist, 19th century painting expert
- Spouses: Micheline Leymarie (1952–1982); Fabienne Fernandez (–2017)
- Children: Christine Marumo, Helene Marumo, Paul Marumo
- Parents: Paul Henri Marumo (father); Zaïre Louise Monde (mother)
- Honours: National Order of the Legion of Honour, Chevalier (Knight) rank (1997), Ordre national du Mérite. Chevalier (Knight) rank

Claude Marumo (Claude Paul Marumo; 18 November 1928 – 22 March 2017) was a French art dealer, gallerist and expert of Barbizon School. He was Honorary Expert at the Paris Court of Appeal, specialized in 19th and 20th century painting and drawing (2004).

Marumo founded the Galerie Claude Marumo in 1952, located on 243, Rue Saint-Honoré, Paris, France. He was considered as one of the best specialists of the nineteenth century and of Barbizon School. He was the authoritative expert for the painter Paul Désiré Trouillebert and member of the Paul Désiré Trouillebert committee.

In 1997, Claude Marumo as an antiques dealer with 50 years of professional and military service, was honored with the Chevalier (Knight) rank of the National Order of the Legion of Honour, France's highest recognition for exceptional military and civil achievements. He also has been awarded with the Chevalier (Knight) rank of the Ordre national du Mérite.

== Biography ==
Claude was born in a family of an art dealer Paul Henri Marumo (1887–1984) and Zaïre Louise Monde (1890–1967) on 18 November 1928 in Paris.

On 8 September 1952 he married Micheline Leymarie (16 July 1929 – 10 October 1993), and their marriage was registered in the 9th arrondissement of Paris. The same year they opened Galerie Marumo on the prestigious Rue Saint-Honoré in the 1st arrondissement of Paris.

On 17 July 1953, the family welcomed their first daughter Christine Marumo. On 19 January 1959, their second daughter Helene Marumo was born. The couple's divorce was finalized in December 1982. In the early 1990s, Claude remarried with Fabienne Fernandez and welcomed a son Paul Marumo.

On 22 March 2017, Claude Marumo died at his home in West Palm Beach, Florida, at the age of 88. His funeral was held on 13 April 2017 at the Saint-Ouen Cemetery near Paris.

== Professional life ==
Claude Marumo started his career as an art dealer at his father's antique shop in the 9th arrondissement of Paris, just across the Montmartre, 8, Rue Alfred Stevens. Father and son then moved their gallery to the 23, Rue Peletier, Paris, France. In 1952, he opened his own gallery Galerie Marumo on 243, Rue Saint-Honoré, Paris, France. Later on, in 2008, he moved back the gallery to 23, rue Peletier, Paris, France. In 2013, he then retired to Palm Beach, USA, with his wife and son. He continued to sell artworks there, as well. Claude Marumo was specialized in the 19th century art and considered as a recognized international expert for the Barbizon School. He is the author of a book "Barbizon and the 19th century landscapers" (French: "Barbizon et les paysagistes du XIX"). He also co-wrote the catalog raisonné of Barbizon School painter Paul Trouillebert (1831–1900).

Claude Marumo was Honorary Expert at the Paris Court of Appeal, specialized in 19th & 20th century painting and drawing (2004). Between 1975 and 2009, he worked as an expert in more than 487 art auctions, working closely with auction houses such as Hôtel Drouot, Drouot-Richelieu, Drouot Montaigne, Nouveau Drouot, Drouot Rive Gauche, Palais des Congrès Versailles among others. One of his most recognisable auctions, where he worked as an expert, was the Collection of art dealer and collector Georges Renand. The auction presented works by such respectable artists as Pierre Bonnard, Jean-Baptiste-Camille Corot, Raoul Dufy, Théodore Géricault, Auguste Renoir, Henri de Toulouse Lautrec, Édouard Vuillard and others. But the most expensive artwork that was sold at the auction was by Amedeo Modigliani - "Portrait of a Woman in a Black Tie" that reached and was sold for 34 million francs.

== Art expert ==
Honorary Expert at the Paris Court of Appeal, specialized in Barbizon School and 19th & 20th century painting and drawing (2004). Claude Marumo has been an expert for various art auctions, as well as commissaire-priseur (official auctioneer) for the auction "Paintings of 19th and 20th century" (original title in French: "Tableaux des XIXe et XXe siècles") at the auction house Drouot-Richelieu that took place on the19th June 1989.

Between 1975 and 2009, he worked as an expert in more than 487 art auctions, working closely with auction houses such as Hôtel Drouot, Drouot-Richelieu, Drouot Montaigne, Nouveau Drouot, Drouot Rive Gauche, Palais des Congrès Versailles among others.

== Bibliography ==
- Albert Malet et les Peintres de l'Ecole Normande : Galerie Claude Marumo / Exposition, 1972
- Barbizon et les paysagistes du XIXe: Texte imprimé / Claude Marumo / [S.l.]: Ed. de l'Amateur , 1975
- Les paysagistes en Europe au XIXe siècle : Galerie Claude Marumo / Exposition, 1977
- Paul Désiré Trouillebert 1831-1900: catalogue raisonné de l'œuvre peint / Claude Marumo,... Thomas Maier, Bernd Müllerschön / Stuttgart : Thombe , 2004
