= Ernest Hébert =

French painter (1817–1908)

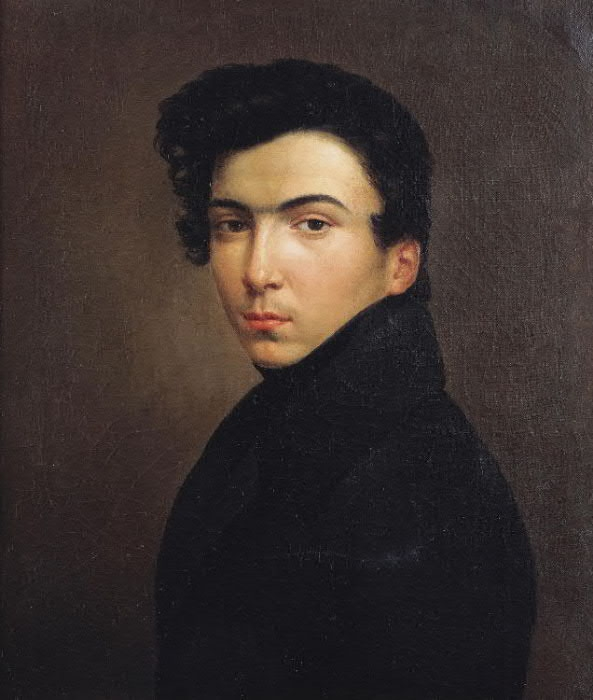
Self-portrait, aged 17

Antoine Auguste Ernest Hébert (French pronunciation: [ɑ̃twan oɡyst ɛʁnɛst ebɛʁ]; 3 November 1817 – 5 December 1908) was a French academic painter.

== Biography ==
Hébert was born in Grenoble, son of a notary in Grenoble, and moved in 1835 to Paris to study law. He simultaneously took art lessons in the workshops of the sculptor David d'Angers (1788–1856), and also of the history painter Paul Delaroche (1797–1896), but even though he took art lessons he was mostly a selftaught artist. At the age of 22 years he achieved success with his painting Le cup en prison in the Paris Salon. The Académie des Beaux-Arts awarded him the Prix de Rome in 1839 for the biblical composition Joseph's cup in Benjamin's sack. The prize was a scholarship and a long study stay in the Villa Medici in Rome.

His painting Mal'aria was exhibited in the Salon of 1850, and now hangs in the Musée d'Orsay, Paris. Painted in a Romantic style, it depicts a family of Italian peasants escaping an epidemic by raft, a scene inspired by events Hébert had witnessed while in Italy.

One of Hébert's students Paul Trouillebert was an important artist of the Barbizon School. The artist's house is preserved as the Musée Hébert in the 6th arrondissement of Paris. There is another museum near Grenoble.

== Gallery ==
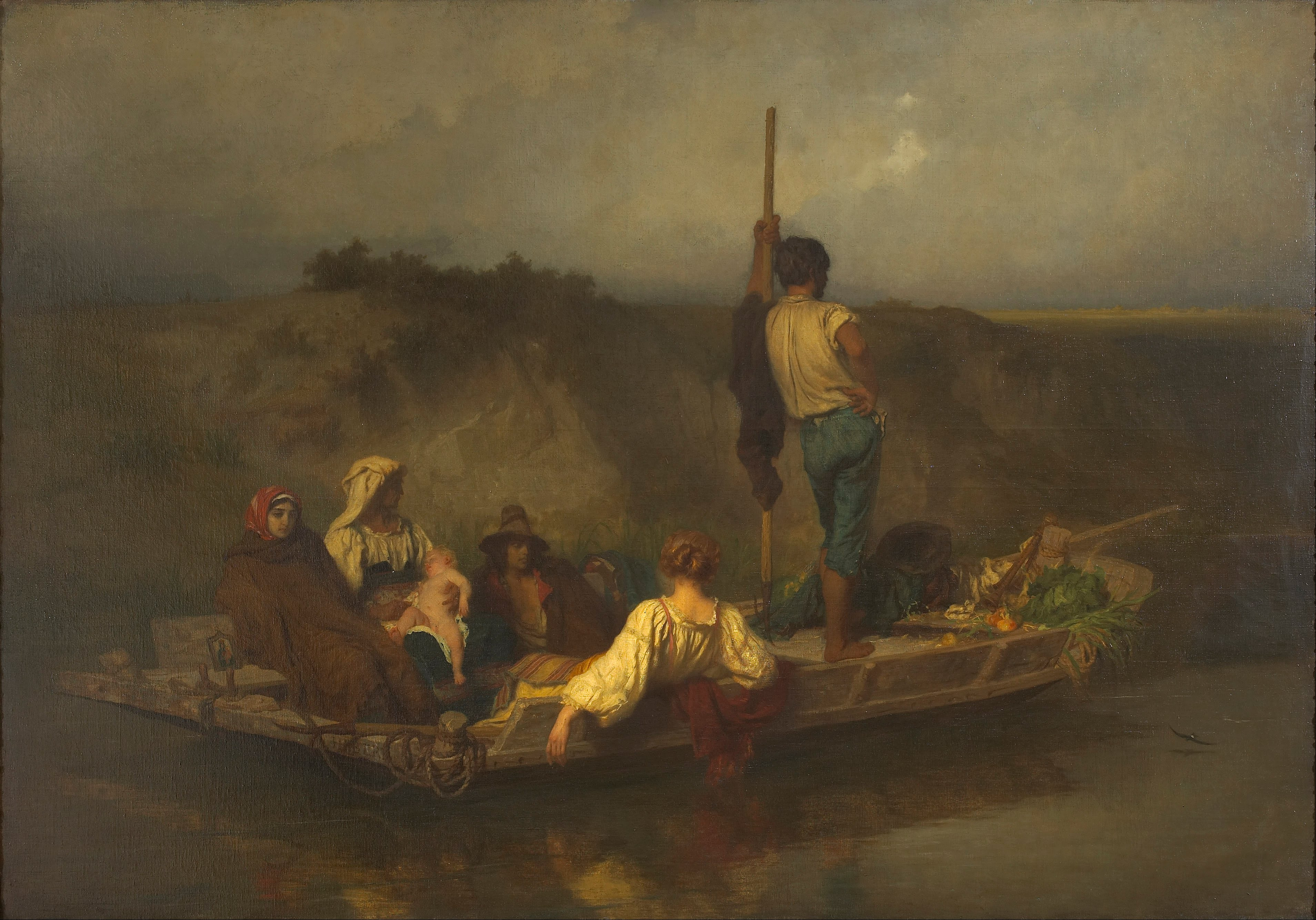
Mal'aria (1848–49), Musée d'Orsay, Paris.

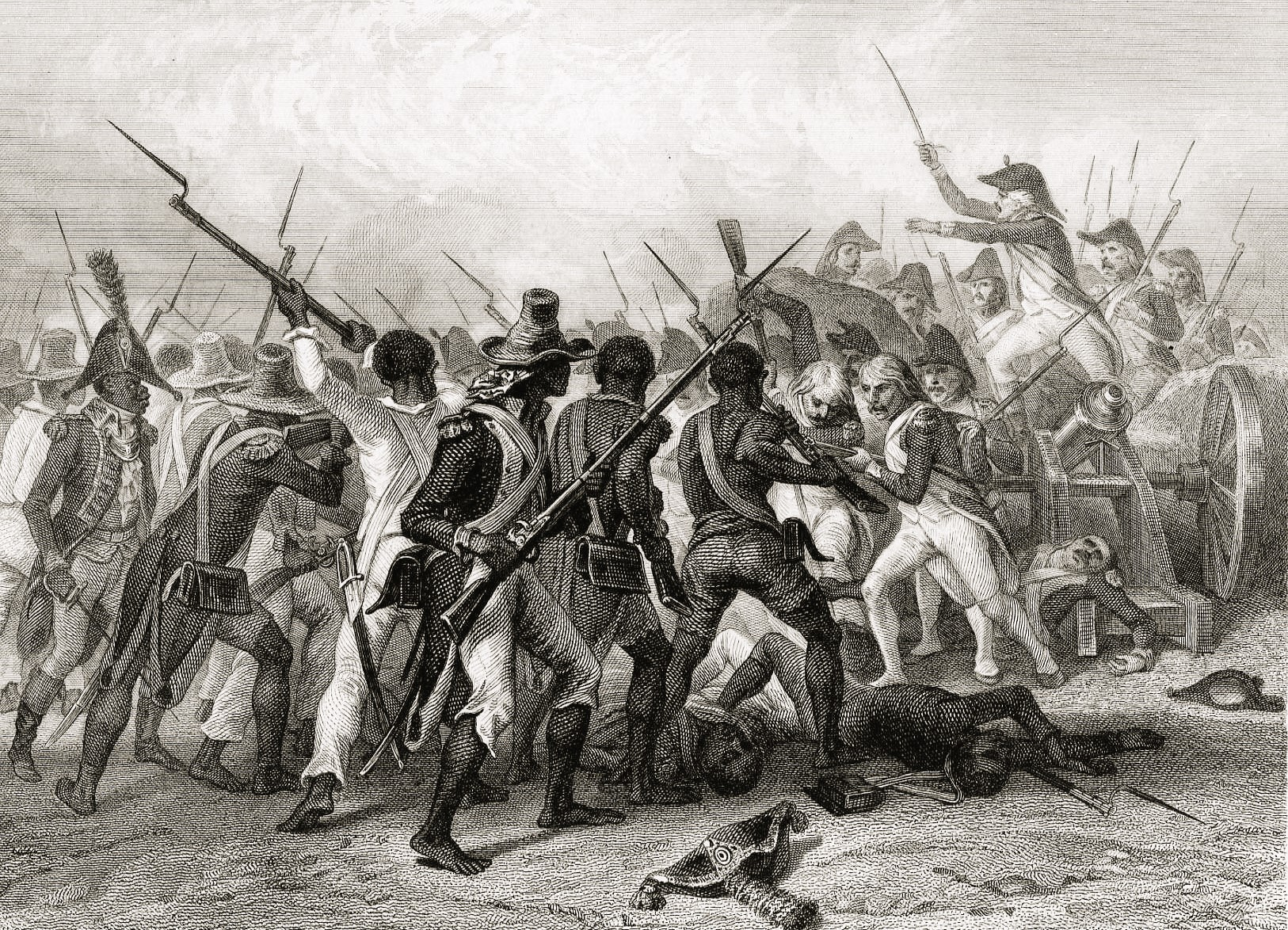
Attack and capture of the Crête-à-Pierrot, 1839

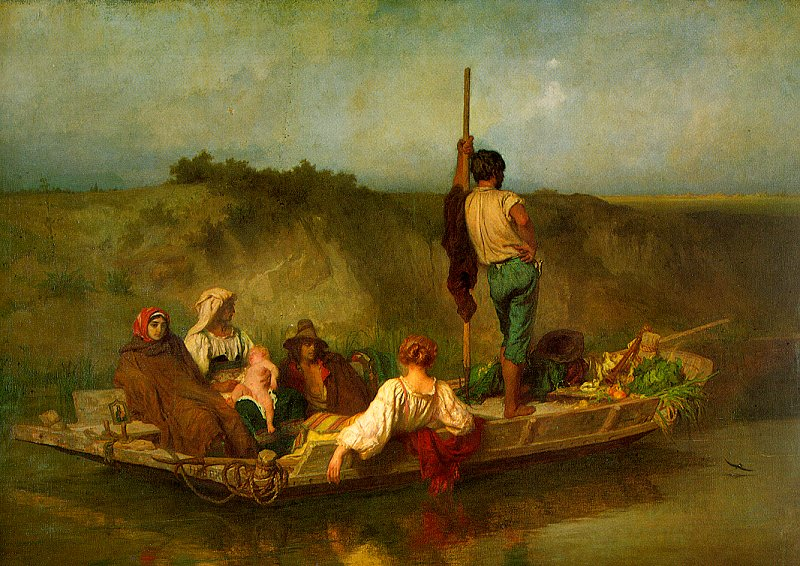
La Mal'aria, 1848

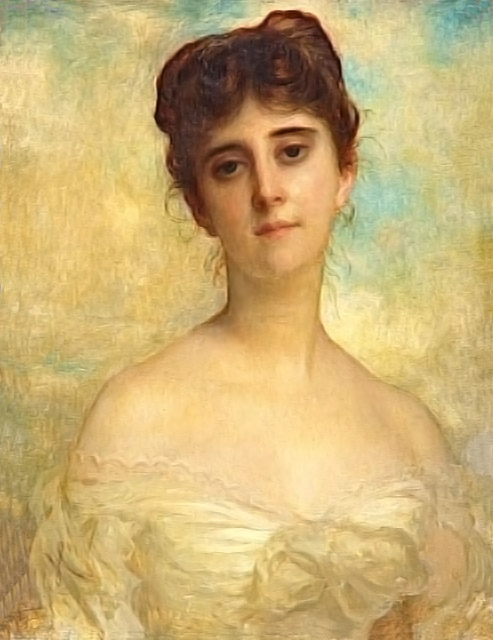
Louise Lefuel Hochon, Musée Hébert, Paris.

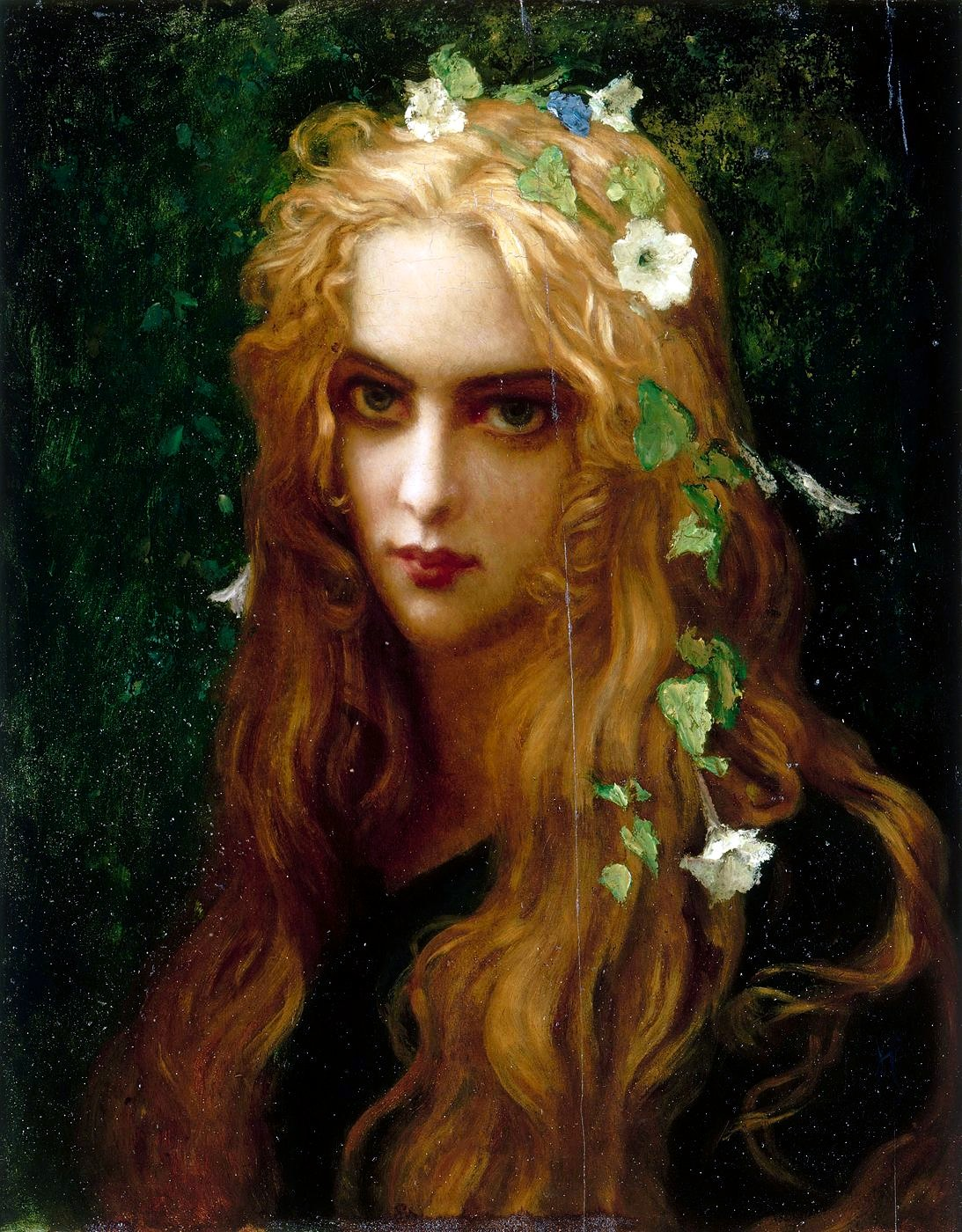
Ophélie, Musée Hébert, Paris.

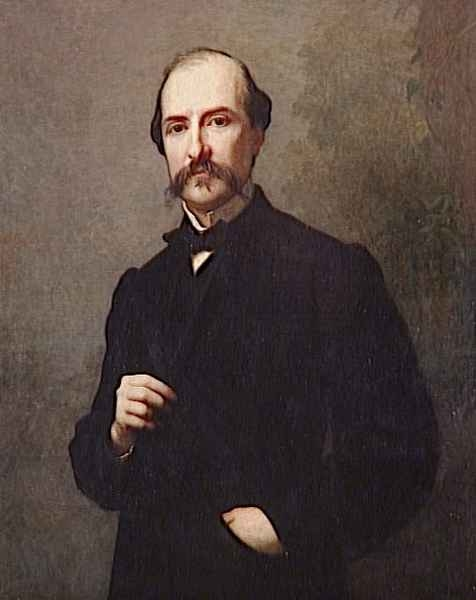
Portrait of the writer, Léon Laurent-Pichat

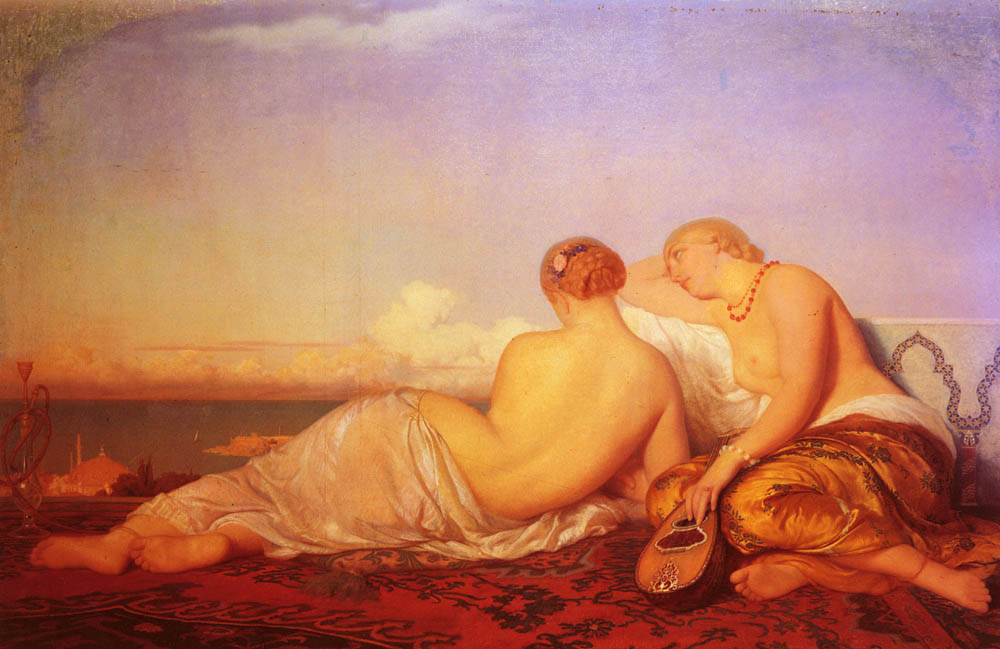
Two Odalisques Contemplating the Bosphorus, 1843

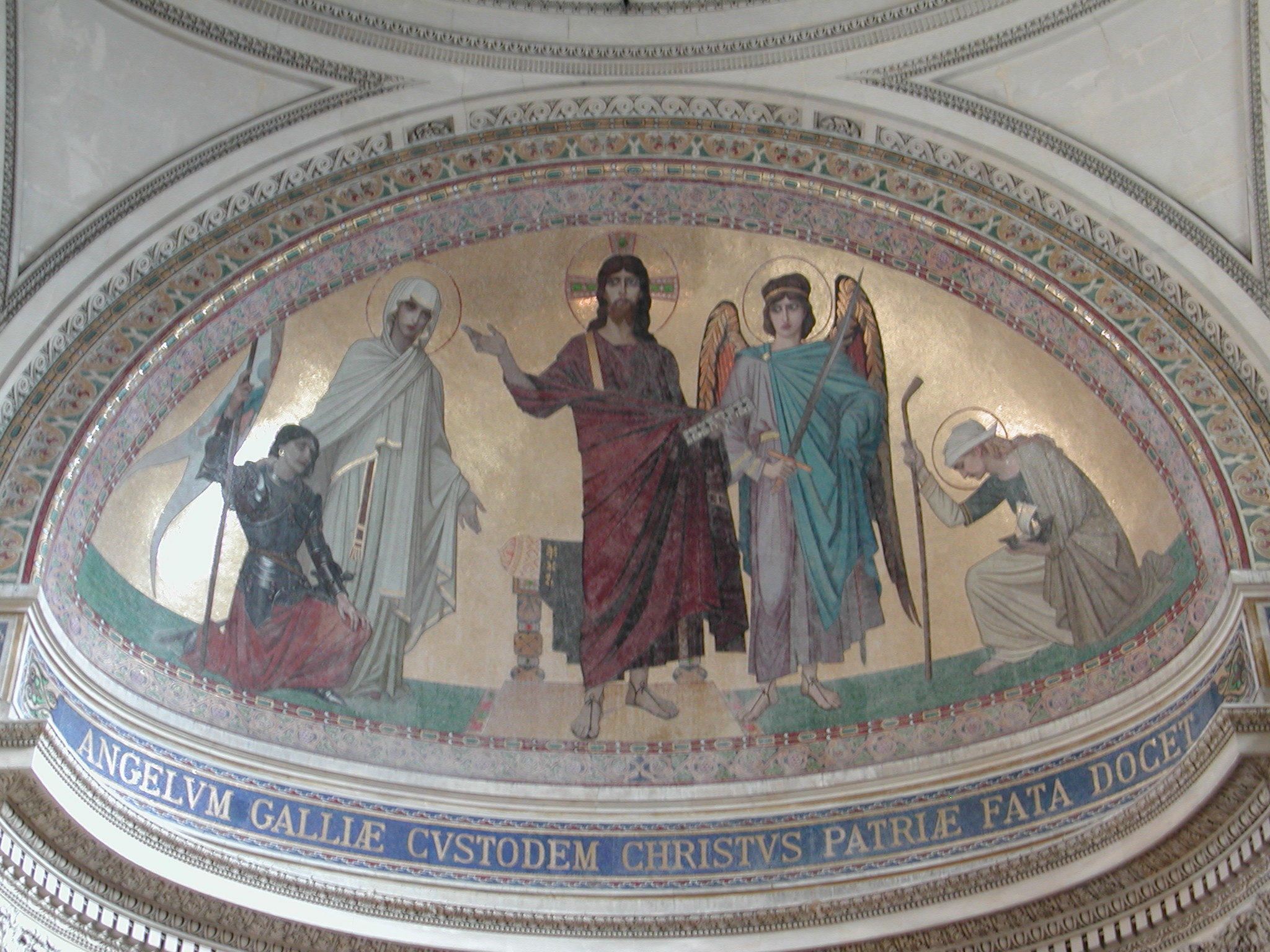
Mosaic in the apse of the Panthéon (Paris)
