= Musée Hébert =

Museum in Paris, France

Coordinates: 48°50′50.5″N 2°19′21.5″E

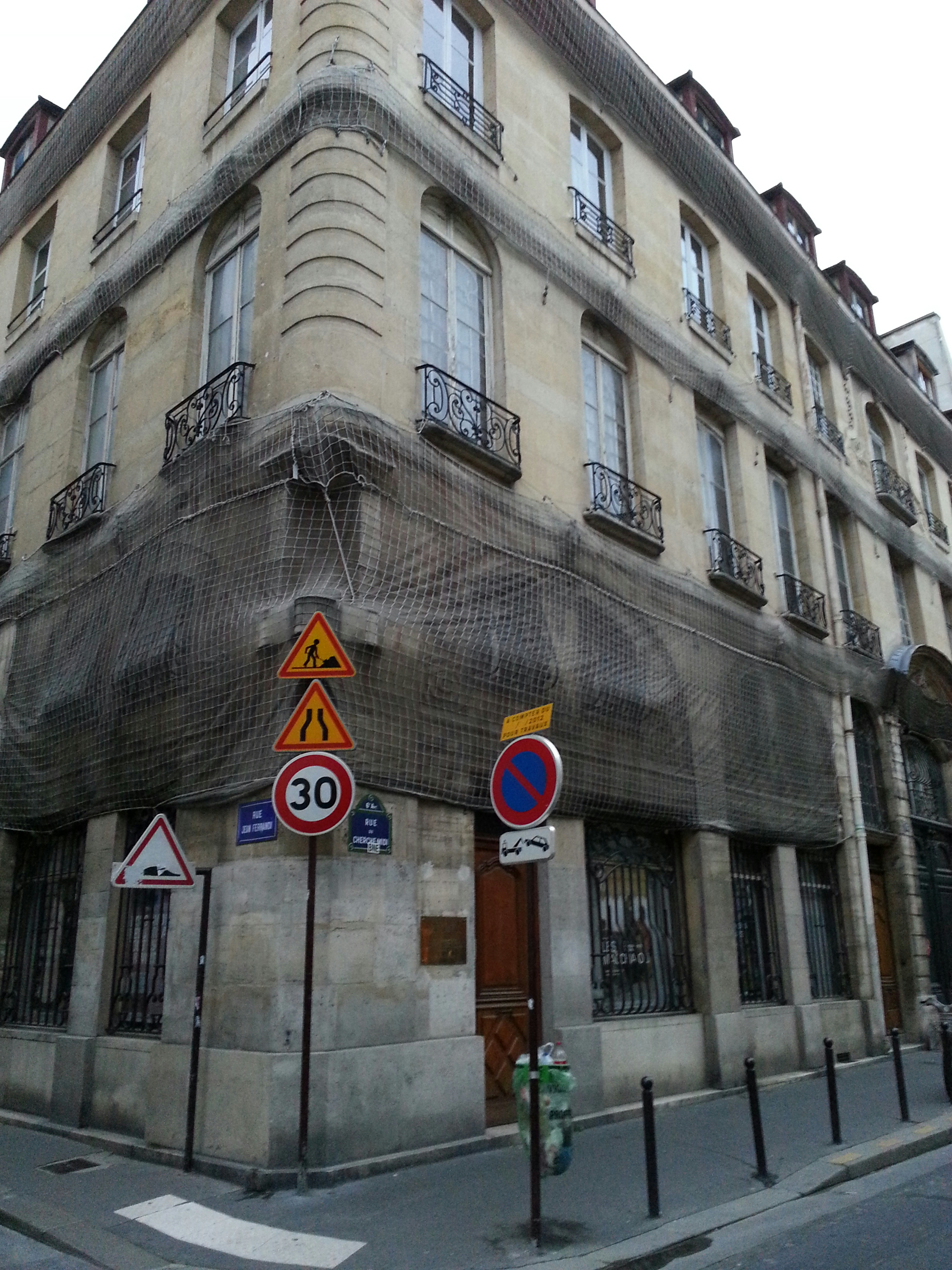
Musée Hébert (2013)

The Musée Hébert was a museum located in the Hôtel de Montmorency-Bours at 85, rue du Cherche-Midi, in the 6th arrondissement of Paris, France. It had been closed since 2004 for renovations, and it was announced on October 9, 2023, that the museum would be permanently closed, and its collection transferred to the Musée Hébert in La Tronche.

The museum was housed within the Petit-Montmorency, constructed in 1743 by the Comte de Montmorency, and former home of academic painter Ernest Hébert (1817–1908). After his adopted son's death in 1974, the building became state property and opened as a museum in 1984. S

The museum contained collections of Hébert's work, furniture, decorative items, souvenirs, and photographs, set within rooms almost unchanged since the 18th century. His paintings included portraits of literary critic Jules Lemaître, and two noted grandes horizontales, La Païva and Madame de Loynes.

== See also ==
- List of museums in Paris
