= Christina, Queen of Sweden =

Queen of Sweden from 1632 to 1654

Christina
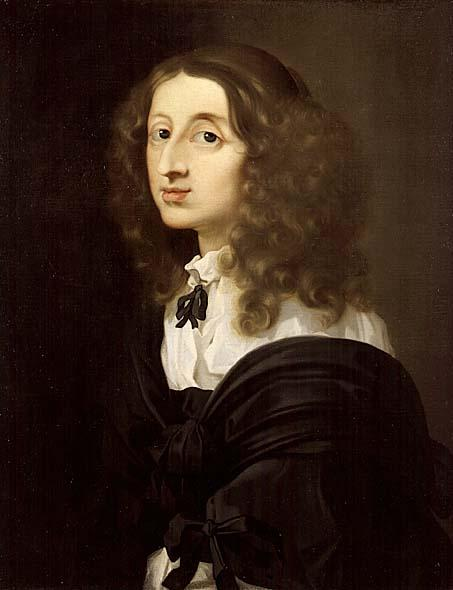
- Portrait by Sébastien Bourdon, who exaggerated her eyes.

Queen of Sweden
- Reign: 16 November [O.S. 6 November] 1632 – 16 June [O.S. 6 June] 1654
- Coronation: 20 October 1650
- Predecessor: Gustavus Adolphus
- Successor: Charles X Gustav
- Regent: Axel Oxenstierna (1632–1644)
- Born: 18 December [O.S. 8 December] 1626; Tre Kronor Castle, Stockholm, Sweden
- Died: 19 April 1689 (aged 62); Rome, Papal States
- Burial: 22 June 1689; St. Peter's Basilica, Vatican City
Names
- Christina Augusta; Christina Alexandra
- House: Vasa
- Father: Gustavus Adolphus
- Mother: Maria Eleonora of Brandenburg

Christina (Swedish: Kristina; 18 December [O.S. 8 December] 1626 – 19 April 1689), a member of the House of Vasa, was Queen of Sweden from 1632 until her abdication in 1654. (Note: With the titles of Queen of the Swedes, Goths (or Geats) and Wends (Suecorum, Gothorum Vandalorumque Regina); Grand Princess of Finland, and Duchess of Estonia, Livonia and Karelia, Bremen-Verden, Stettin, Pomerania, Cassubia and Vandalia, Princess of Rugia, Lady of Ingria and of Wismar.) Her conversion to Catholicism and refusal to marry led her to relinquish her throne and move to Rome.

Christina is remembered as one of the most erudite women of the 17th century, wanting Stockholm to become the "Athens of the North" and was given the special right to establish a university at will by the Peace of Westphalia. She is also remembered for her unconventional lifestyle and occasional adoption of masculine attire, which have been depicted frequently in media; gender and cultural identity are pivotal themes in many of her biographies.

At the age of five, Christina succeeded her father Gustavus Adolphus upon his death at the Battle of Lützen, though she only began ruling the Swedish Empire when she reached the age of eighteen. During the Torstenson War in 1644, she initiated the issuance of copper in lumps to be used as currency. Her lavish spending habits pushed the state towards bankruptcy, sparking public unrest. Christina argued for peace to end the Thirty Years' War and received indemnity. Following scandals over her converting to Catholicism, and not marrying, she relinquished the throne to her cousin Charles X Gustav and settled in Rome.

Pope Alexander VII described Christina as "a queen without a realm, a Christian without faith, and a woman without shame." She played a leading part in the theatrical and musical communities and protected many Baroque artists, composers, and musicians. Christina, who was the guest of five consecutive popes and a symbol of the Counter-Reformation, is one of the few women buried in the Vatican Grottoes.

== Early life ==
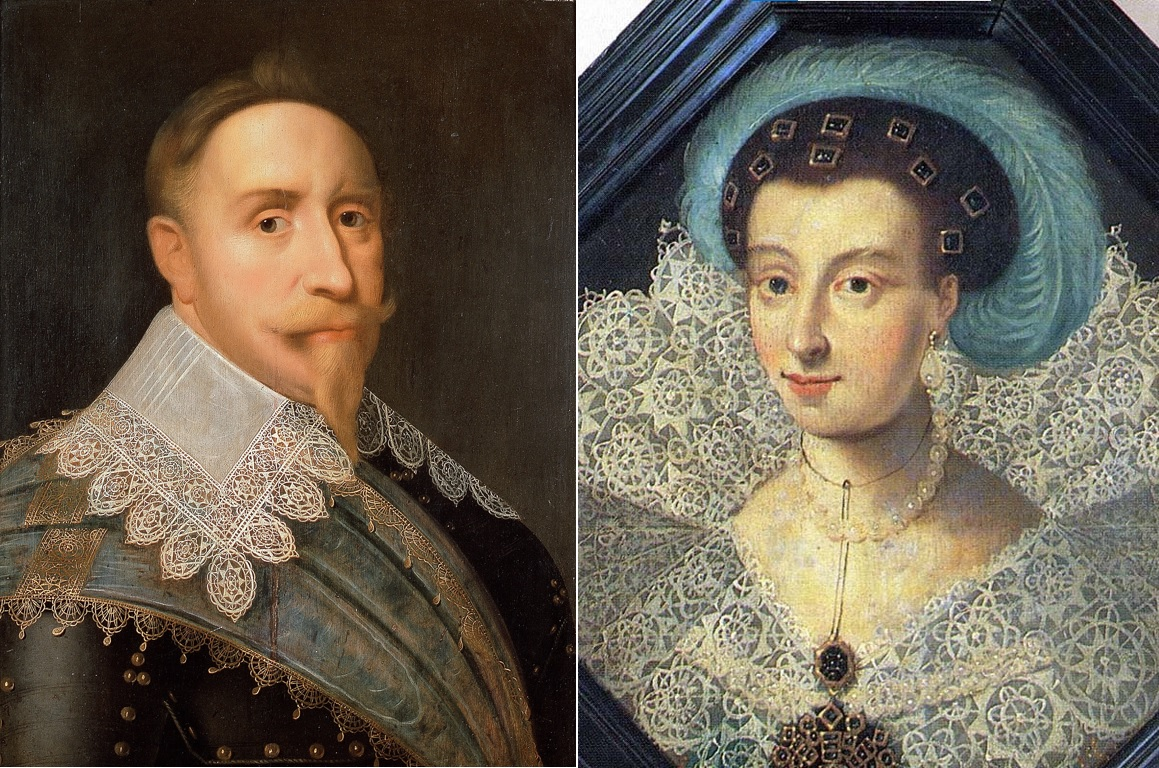
Christina's parents, King Gustav II Adolph and Queen Maria Eleonora

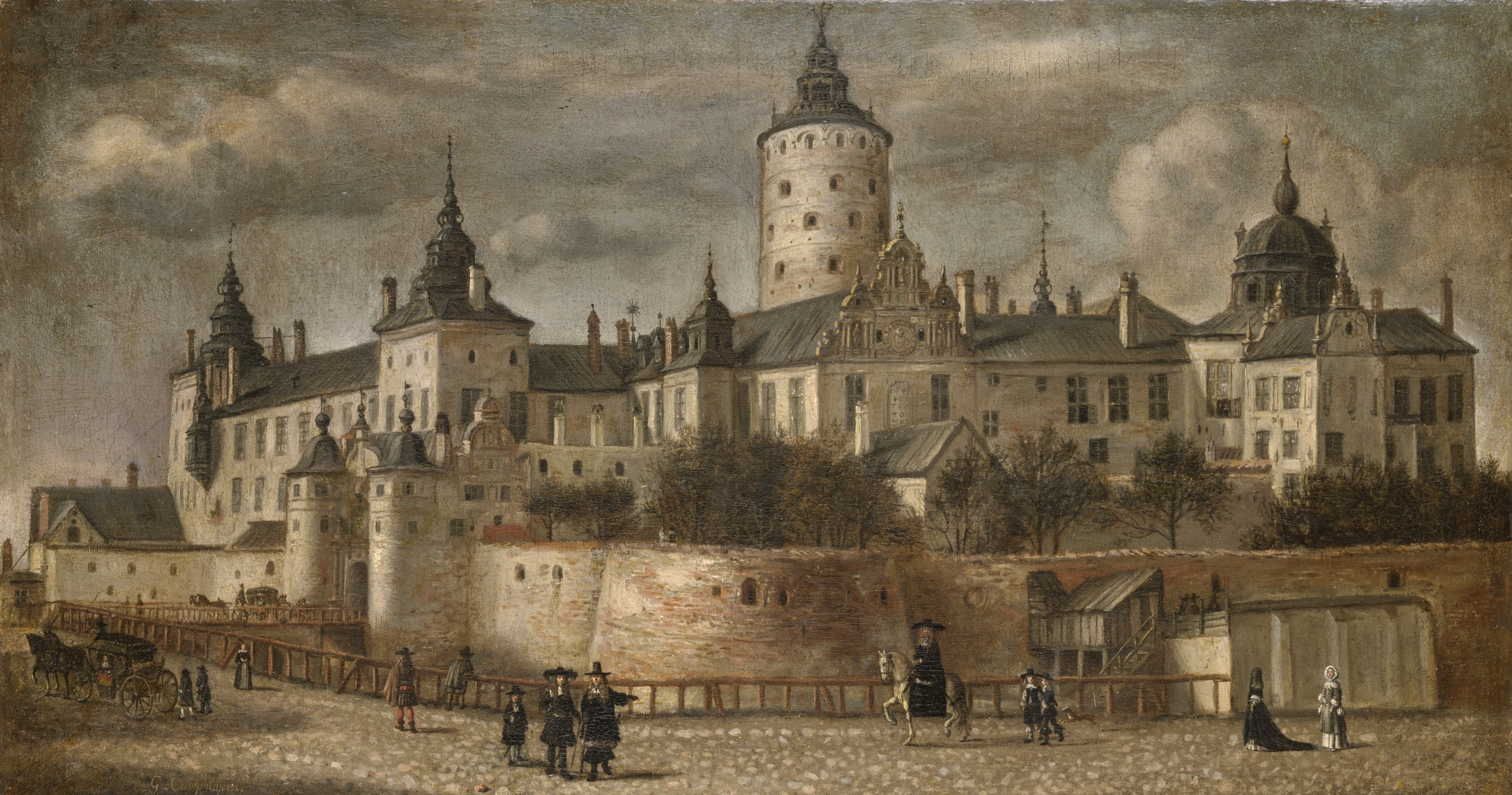
Tre Kronor in Stockholm by Govert Dircksz Camphuysen. Most of Sweden's national library and royal archives were destroyed when the castle burned in 1697.

Christina was born in the royal castle Tre Kronor. Her parents were the Swedish king Gustavus Adolphus and his German wife, Maria Eleonora. They had a stillborn daughter in 1621, then the first Princess Christina, who was born in 1623 and died the following year, and a stillborn son in May 1625. (Note: The three were buried in Riddarholmskyrkan in Stockholm.) Excited expectations surrounded Maria Eleonora's fourth pregnancy in 1626. When the baby was born, it was first thought to be a boy. It was "hairy" and screamed "with a strong, hoarse voice." (Note: "I was born covered with hair from my head to my knees, only my face, arms and legs were free. I was shiny all over and I had a rough, strong voice".) She later wrote in her autobiography that "Deep embarrassment spread among the women when they discovered their mistake." The king, though, was very happy, saying, "She'll be clever, she has made fools of us all!" Gustavus Adolphus was closely attached to his daughter, whereas her mother remained aloof in her disappointment at the child being a girl. In the year after Christina's birth, Maria Eleonora was described as being in a state of hysteria owing to her husband's absences. She showed little affection for her daughter and was not allowed any influence in Christina's upbringing. The king was worried that her instability might pass on to their daughter.

The Crown of Sweden was hereditary in the House of Vasa, but following the reign of Christina's grandfather Charles IX (r. 1604–11), it excluded Vasa princes descended from a deposed brother (Eric XIV) and a deposed nephew (Sigismund III Vasa, King of Poland). Gustavus Adolphus's legitimate younger brother Charles Philip had died years earlier. The one legitimate female left, his half-sister Catherine, came to be excluded in 1615 when she married John Casimir, Count Palatine of Kleeburg, a non-Lutheran. Christina became the undisputed heir presumptive. From Christina's birth, King Gustav Adolphus recognized her eligibility even as a female heir, and although she was called "queen," the official title the Riksdag gave at her coronation in February 1633 was "king".

== Regency ==
In June 1630, when Christina was three years old, Gustavus Adolphus left for Germany to defend Protestantism and became involved in the Thirty Years' War. He secured his daughter's right to inherit the throne, in case he never returned, and gave orders to Axel Gustafsson Banér, his marshal, that Christina should receive an education of the type normally only afforded to boys.

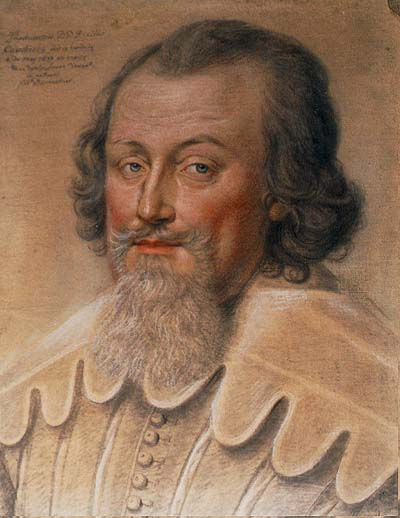
Axel Oxenstierna

When Gustavus Adolphus did not come home as expected after the summer campaign of 1630, Maria wrote to John Casimir, her brother-in-law that she could not stand it; she wanted to die. She begged him to try to persuade the king to come home. It was decided that Maria would travel to Germany the following spring. She arrived on 10 July 1631, to Wolgast in Pomerania. On 11 January 1632, she met with her spouse near Hanau. The couple were spotted for the last time on 28 October 1632 at Erfurt. The very next day, Gustavus Adolphus broke camp and left. On 3 November, Maria wrote to Axel Oxenstierna: "without H.R.M.'s presence, I am worth nothing, not even my life."

Maria, her mother and a member of the House of Hohenzollern, was said to be the most beautiful queen in Europe, but she was also considered hysterical, unstable and overly emotional. It has been suggested that she inherited madness, from both the paternal and maternal lines. However, this image of the hysterical, depressive and profligate queen dowager, which has become part of historiography, has been put into perspective in more recent research, first in the 1980s by the archivist Åke Kromnov, among others, and more recently in the monograph "Drottningen som sa nej" by Moa Matthis, published in 2010.

After the king died on the battlefield on 6 November 1632, Maria Eleonora returned to Sweden with the embalmed body of her husband. The 7-year-old Queen Christina came in solemn procession to Nyköping to receive her mother. Maria Eleonora declared that the burial should not take place during her lifetime - she often spoke of shortening her life - or at least should be postponed as long as possible. She also demanded that the coffin be kept open and went to see it regularly, patting it and taking no notice of the putrefaction. They tried to persuade Maria not to visit the corpse so often. Axel Oxenstierna managed to have the corpse interred in Riddarholmen Church on 22 June 1634, but had to post guards after she tried to dig it up.

Maria Eleanora had been indifferent to her daughter, but after Gustavus Adolphus's death, Christina became the center of her mother's attention. Gustavus Adolphus had decided that in the event of his death, his daughter should be cared for by his half-sister, Catherine of Sweden (Note: She was married to John Casimir, Count Palatine of Kleeburg and moved home to Sweden after the outbreak of the Thirty Years' war. Their children were Maria Eufrosyne, who later married one of Christina's close friends Magnus Gabriel De la Gardie, and Karl Gustav, who inherited the throne after Christina.) and half-brother Carl Gyllenhielm as regent. This solution did not suit Maria Eleonora, who had her sister-in-law banned from the castle. In 1634, the Instrument of Government, a new constitution, was introduced by Oxenstierna. The constitution stipulated that the "King" must have a Privy Council, which Oxenstierna himself headed. Maria Eleonora was considered very difficult, and in 1636 she lost her parental rights to her daughter. The Riksråd justified its decision by asserting that she neglected Christina and her upbringing and that she had a bad influence on her daughter. Chancellor Oxenstierna saw no other solution than to exile the widow to Gripsholm castle, while the governing regency council would decide when she was allowed to see her daughter. (Note: Maria Eleonora complained to her brother about her treatment. In July 1640, she secretly left Sweden to escape to her family. With the consent of King Christian IV of Denmark, under adventurous circumstances, she first fled to Gotland and then stayed at the Danish court in Nykøbing Falster. In 1648, she returned to Sweden and lived at Nyköping.) For the subsequent years, Christina thrived in the company of her aunt Catherine and her family.

In 1638, after the death of her aunt and foster mother, the Royal Regency Council under Axel Oxenstierna saw the need to appoint a new foster mother to the underage monarch, which resulted in a reorganization of the queen's household. To prevent the young queen from being dependent upon a single individual and favorite mother figure, the Royal Council decided to split the office of head lady-in-waiting (responsible for the queen's female courtiers) and the office royal governess (or foster-mother) in four, with two women appointed to share each office. Accordingly, Ebba Leijonhufvud and Christina Natt och Dag were appointed to share the position of royal governess and foster mother with the title Upptuktelse-Förestånderska ('Castigation Mistress'), while Beata Oxenstierna and Ebba Ryning were appointed to share the position of head lady-in-waiting, all four with the formal rank and title of Hovmästarinna.

The Royal Council's method of giving Queen Christina several foster mothers to avoid her forming an attachment to a single person appears to have been effective, as Christina did not mention her foster mothers directly in her memoirs and did not seem to have formed an attachment to any of them; in fact, with only a few exceptions, including Ebba Sparre, Lady Jane Ruthven and Louise van der Nooth, Christina did not show any interest in any of her female courtiers. She generally mentions them in her memoirs only to compare herself favorably toward them by referring to herself as more masculine than they.

Christina was educated as a royal male would have been. The theologian Johannes Matthiae Gothus became her tutor; he gave her lessons in religion, philosophy, Greek and Latin. Chancellor Oxenstierna taught her politics and discussed Tacitus with her. Oxenstierna proudly wrote of the 14-year-old girl that "she is not at all like a female" and had "a bright intelligence." Christina seemed happy to study ten hours a day. Besides Swedish and German, she learned at least six more languages: Dutch, Danish, French, Italian, Arabic and Hebrew. (Note: Letters still exist, written by her in German to her father when she was five. When the ambassador of France, Pierre Hector Chanut, arrived in Stockholm in 1645, he stated admiringly, "She talks French as if she was born in the Louvre!" (According to B. Guilliet, she spoke French in a kind of Liège dialect.))

== Reign ==
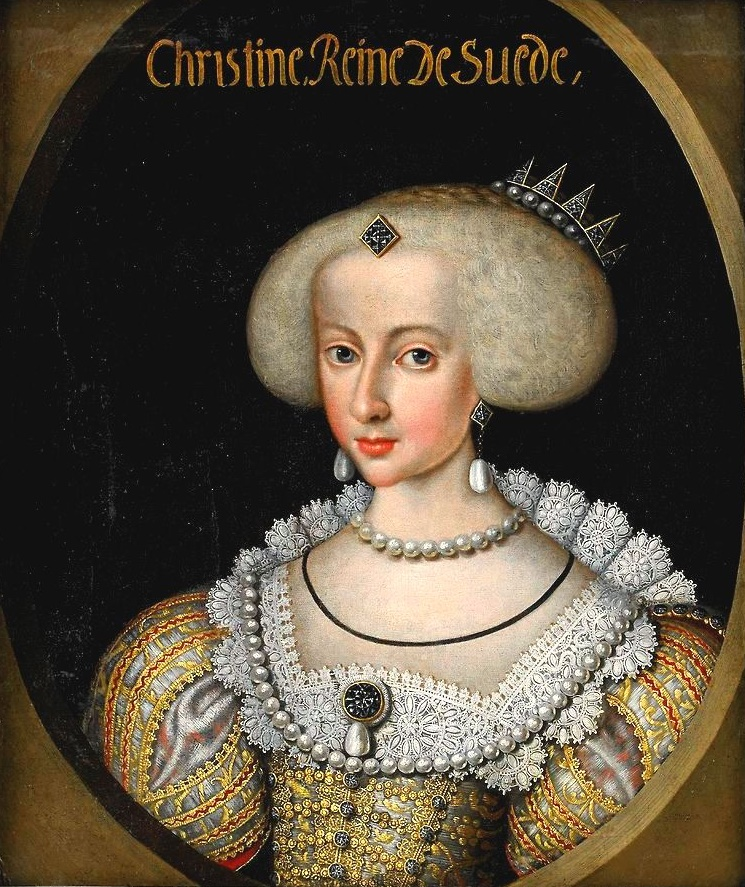
The 14-year-old Christina as queen, painting by Jacob Heinrich Elbfas

In 1644, at the age of 18, Christina was declared an adult, although the coronation was postponed because of the Torstenson War. She was visited by a group of Dutch diplomats, including Johan de Witt, to find a solution for the Sound Dues. In the Treaty of Brömsebro, signed at a creek in Blekinge, Denmark added the isles of Gotland and Ösel to Christina's domain while Norway lost the districts of Jämtland and Härjedalen to her. Under Christina's rule, Sweden, virtually controlling the Baltic Sea, had unrestricted access to the North Sea and was no longer encircled by Denmark–Norway.

Chancellor Oxenstierna soon discovered that her political views differed from his own. In 1645, he sent his son, Johan Oxenstierna, to the Peace Congress in the Westphalian city of Osnabrück, to argue against peace with the Holy Roman Empire. Christina, however, wanted peace at any cost and sent her own delegate, Johan Adler Salvius.

The Peace of Westphalia was signed in October 1648, effectively ending the European wars of religion. Sweden received an indemnity of five million thalers, used primarily to pay its troops. Sweden further received Western Pomerania (henceforth Swedish Pomerania), Wismar, the Archbishopric of Bremen, and the Bishopric of Verden as hereditary fiefs, thus gaining a seat and vote in the Diet of the Holy Roman Empire and in the respective diets (Kreistage) of three Imperial Circles: the Upper Saxon Circle, Lower Saxon Circle, and Lower Rhenish-Westphalian Circle; the city of Bremen was disputed.

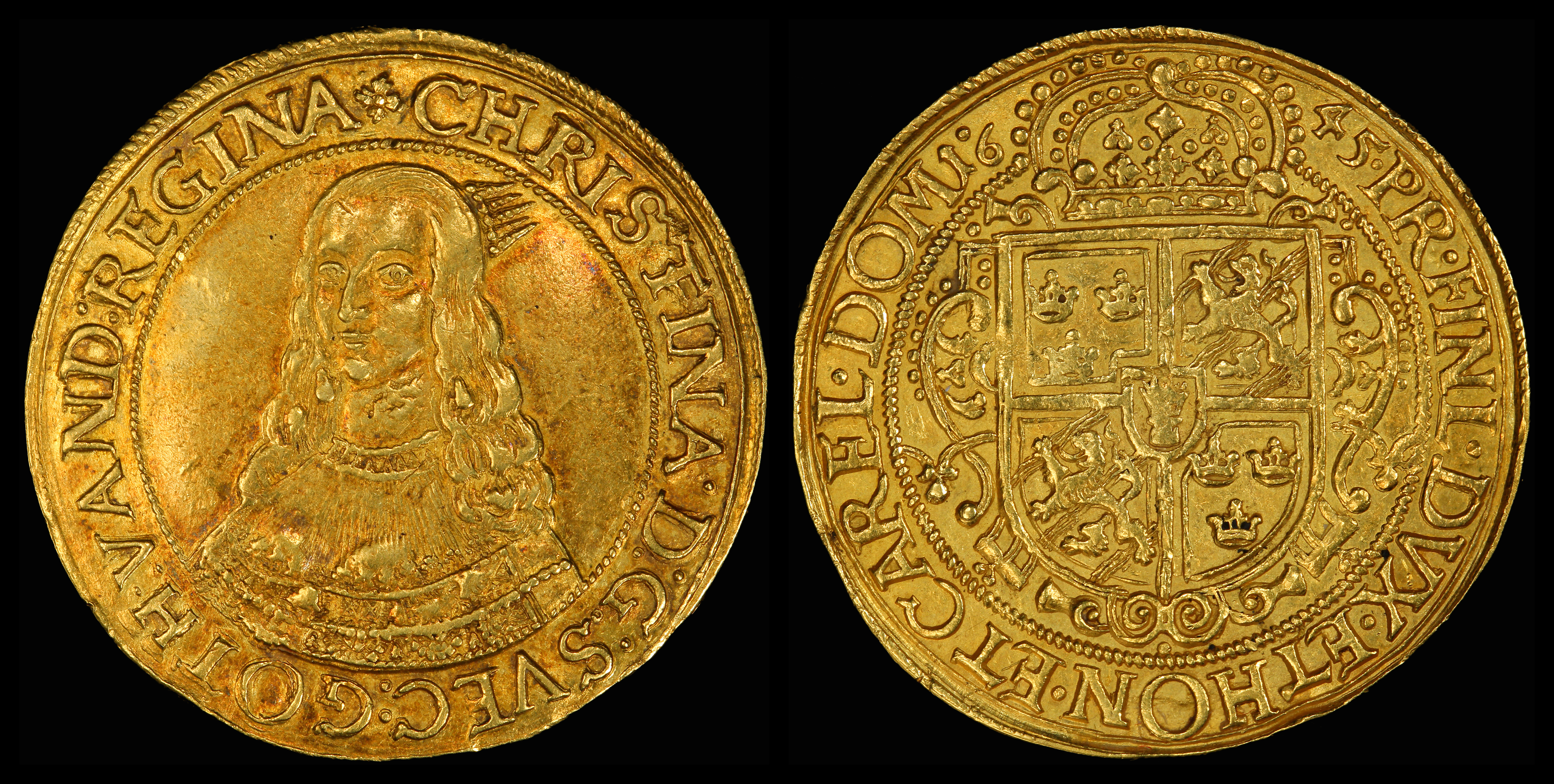
Christina on a 1645 10 ducat coin from Erfurt, which then was occupied by Swedish forces. (Note: There are seven gold coins known to exist bearing the effigy of Queen Christina: a unique 1649 five ducat, and six 1645 10 ducat specimen.)

Shortly before the conclusion of the peace settlement, she admitted Salvius into the council, against Oxenstierna's wishes. Salvius was no aristocrat, but Christina wanted the opposition to the aristocracy present. In 1649, with the help of her uncle, John Casimir, Christina tried to reduce the influence of Oxenstierna when she declared her cousin Charles Gustav as her heir presumptive. The following year, Christina resisted demands from the other estates (clergy, burghers, and peasants) in the Riksdag of the Estates for the reduction of the number of noble landholdings that were tax-exempt. She never implemented such a policy. In 1649, Louis de Geer founded the Swedish Africa Company and in 1650, Christina hired Hendrik Carloff to improve trade on the Gold Coast. Her reign also saw the founding of the colony of New Sweden in 1638; it lasted until 1655.

=== Patronage of the arts ===
Oil painting of Christina as the goddess Minerva, by Flemish painter Justus van Egmont

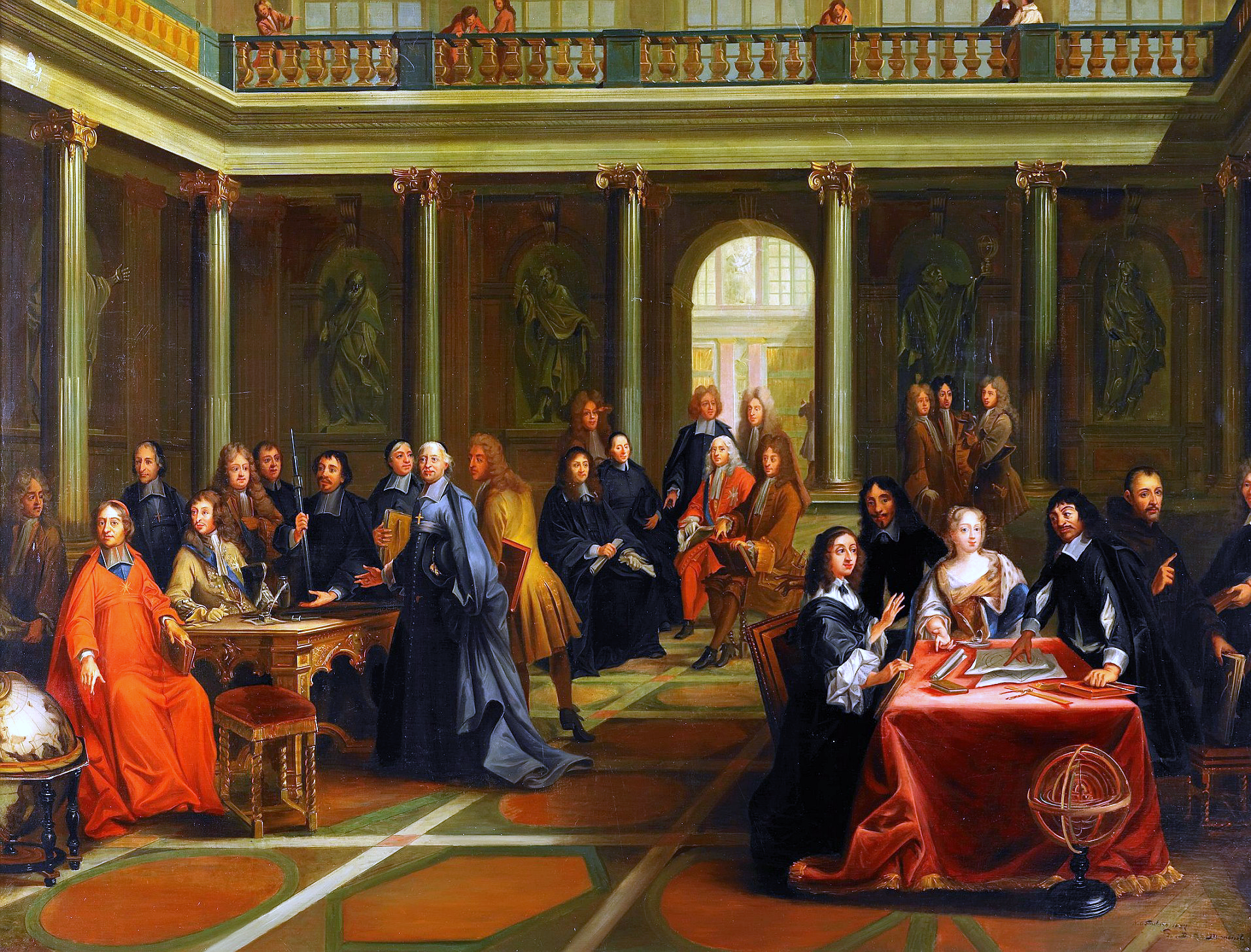
Queen Christina (at the table on the right) in discussion with French philosopher René Descartes. (Romanticized painting by Nils Forsberg (1842–1934), after Pierre Louis Dumesnil

Christina has been described as the "Minerva of the North" due to her strong support of arts and academics. In 1645, Christina invited Hugo Grotius, the author of Mare Liberum, to become her librarian, but he died on his way in Rostock. That same year she founded Ordinari Post Tijdender ("Regular Mail Times"), the oldest currently published newspaper in the world. In 1647, Johann Freinsheim was appointed as her librarian. During the Thirty Years' War, Swedish troops looted books from conquered territories and dispatched them to Sweden to win favour with Christina. After the Battle of Prague (1648), when her armies looted Prague Castle, many of the treasures collected by Rudolf II were brought back to Stockholm. Thus, Christina acquired a number of valuable illustrated works and rare manuscripts for her library. The inventory drawn up at the time mentions 100 an allerhand Kunstbüchern ("a hundred art books of different kinds"), among them two world-famous manuscripts: the Codex Argenteus and the Codex Gigas.

In 1649, 760 paintings, 170 marble and 100 bronze statues, 33,000 coins and medallions, 600 pieces of crystal, 300 scientific instruments, manuscripts, and books (including the Sanctae Crucis laudibus by Rabanus Maurus) were transported to Stockholm. The art, from Prague Castle, had belonged to Rudolf II, Holy Roman Emperor and had been captured by Hans Christoff von Königsmarck during the Battle of Prague and the negotiations of the Peace of Westphalia. By 1649–1650, "her desire to collect men of learning round her, as well as books and rare manuscripts, became almost a mania", Goldsmith wrote. To catalog her new collection she asked Isaac Vossius to come to Sweden and Heinsius to purchase more books on the market.

Her ambitions naturally demanded a wide-ranging correspondence. Not infrequently, she sat and wrote far into the night while the servants came and went with new wax candles. The "Semiramis from the North" corresponded with Pierre Gassendi, her favorite author. Blaise Pascal offered her a copy of his pascaline. She had a firm grasp of classical history and philosophy. Christina studied Neostoicism, the Church Fathers, and Islam; she systematically looked for a copy of the Treatise of the Three Impostors, a work bestowing doubt on all organized religion. In 1651, the kabbalist Menasseh ben Israel offered to become her agent or librarian for Hebrew books and manuscripts; they discussed his messianic ideas as he had recently spelled them out in his latest book, Hope of Israel. Other illustrious scholars who came to visit were Claude Saumaise, Johannes Schefferus, Olaus Rudbeck, Johann Heinrich Boeckler, Gabriel Naudé, Christian Ravis, Nicolaas Heinsius and Samuel Bochart, together with Pierre Daniel Huet and Marcus Meibomius, who wrote a book about Greek dance.

Christina was interested in theatre, especially the plays of Pierre Corneille; she was herself an amateur actress. From 1638 Oxenstierna employed a French ballet troupe under Antoine de Beaulieu, who also had to teach Christina to move around more elegantly. In 1647, the Italian architect Antonio Brunati was ordered to build a theatrical setting in one of the larger rooms of the palace. In 1648, she commissioned 35 paintings from Jacob Jordaens for a ceiling in Uppsala Castle. The court poet Georg Stiernhielm wrote several plays in the Swedish language, such as Den fångne Cupido eller Laviancu de Diane, performed with Christina taking the main part of the goddess Diana. She invited foreign companies to play at Bollhuset. An Italian opera troupe visited in 1652 with Vincenzo Albrici and Angelo Michele Bartolotti, a guitarist. A Dutch theater troupe with Ariana Nozeman, Elisabeth de Baer and Susanna van Lee visited her in 1653. Among the French artists she employed was Anne Chabanceau de La Barre, who was made court singer.

=== Descartes ===
In 1646, Christina's good friend, the French ambassador Pierre Chanut, met and corresponded with the philosopher René Descartes, asking him for a copy of his Meditations. Upon showing the queen some of the letters, Christina became interested in beginning a correspondence with Descartes. She invited him to Sweden, but Descartes was reluctant until she asked him to organize a scientific academy. Christina sent a ship to pick up the philosopher and 2,000 books. Descartes arrived on 4 October 1649. He resided with Chanut and finished his Passions of the Soul. It is highly unlikely Descartes wrote a "Ballet de la Naissance de la Paix," performed on her birthday. On the day after, 19 December 1649, he probably started his private lessons for the queen. With Christina's strict schedule, he was invited to the cold and draughty castle at 5:00 am daily to discuss philosophy and religion. Soon, it became clear they did not like each other; she disapproved of his mechanical view, and he did not appreciate her interest in Ancient Greek. On 15 January Descartes wrote he had seen Christina only four or five times. On 1 February 1650, Descartes caught a cold. He died ten days later, early in the morning of 11 February 1650, and according to Chanut, the cause of his death was pneumonia. (Note: Over time there have been speculations regarding the death of the philosopher. Theodor Ebert claimed that Descartes did not meet his end by being exposed to the harsh Swedish winter climate, as philosophers have been fond of repeating, but by arsenic poisoning. It has been suggested Descartes was an obstacle to Christina's becoming a true Catholic.)

=== Marriage issue ===
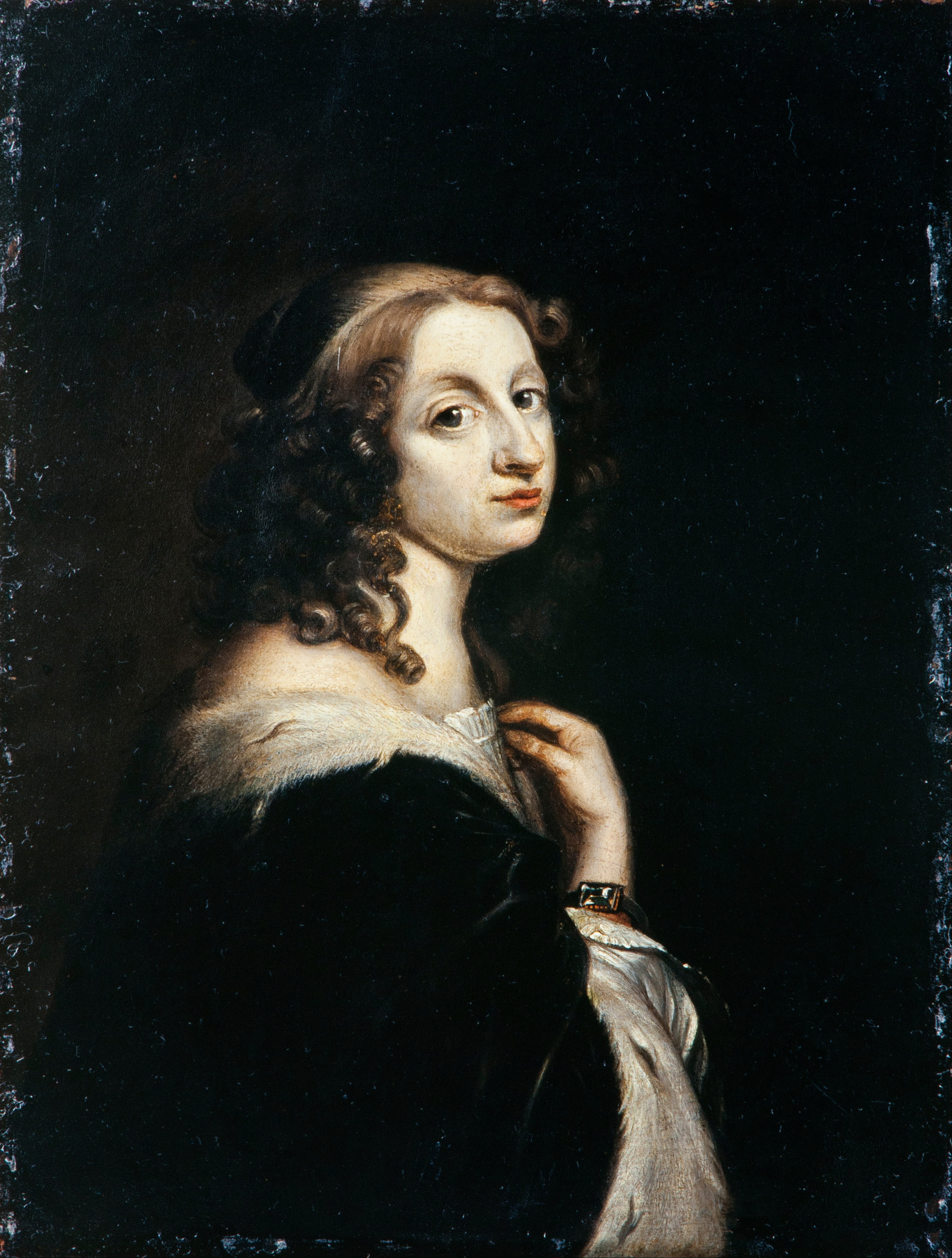
Christina by David Beck

By the age of nine, Christina was already impressed by the Catholic religion and the merits of celibacy. She read a biography of the English "virgin queen" Elizabeth I with interest. But Christina understood that she was expected to provide an heir to the Swedish throne. Her first cousin Charles was infatuated with her, and they became secretly engaged before he left in 1642 to serve in the Swedish army in Germany for three years. Christina revealed in her autobiography that she felt "an insurmountable distaste for marriage" and "for all the things that females talked about and did." She once stated, "It takes more courage to marry than to go to war." As she was chiefly occupied with her studies, she slept three to four hours a night, forgot to comb her hair, donned her clothes in a hurry and wore men's shoes for the sake of convenience. (In fact, her permanent bed-head became her trademark look in paintings.) When Christina left Sweden, she continued to write passionate letters to her intimate friend Ebba Sparre, in which she told her that she would always love her. However, such emotional letters were relatively common at that time, and Christina would use the same style when writing to women she had never met but whose writings she admired.

=== Coronation ===
Christina's coronation took place on 22 October 1650. Christina went to the castle of Jacobsdal, where she boarded a coronation carriage draped in black velvet embroidered in gold and pulled by three white horses. The procession to Storkyrkan was so long that when the first carriages arrived, the last ones had not yet left Jacobsdal (a distance of roughly 10.5 km or 6.5 miles). All four estates were invited to dine at the castle. Fountains at the marketplace splashed out wine for three days, a whole roast ox was served, and illuminations sparkled, followed by a themed parade (The Illustrious Splendors of Felicity) on 24 October.

=== Religion and health ===
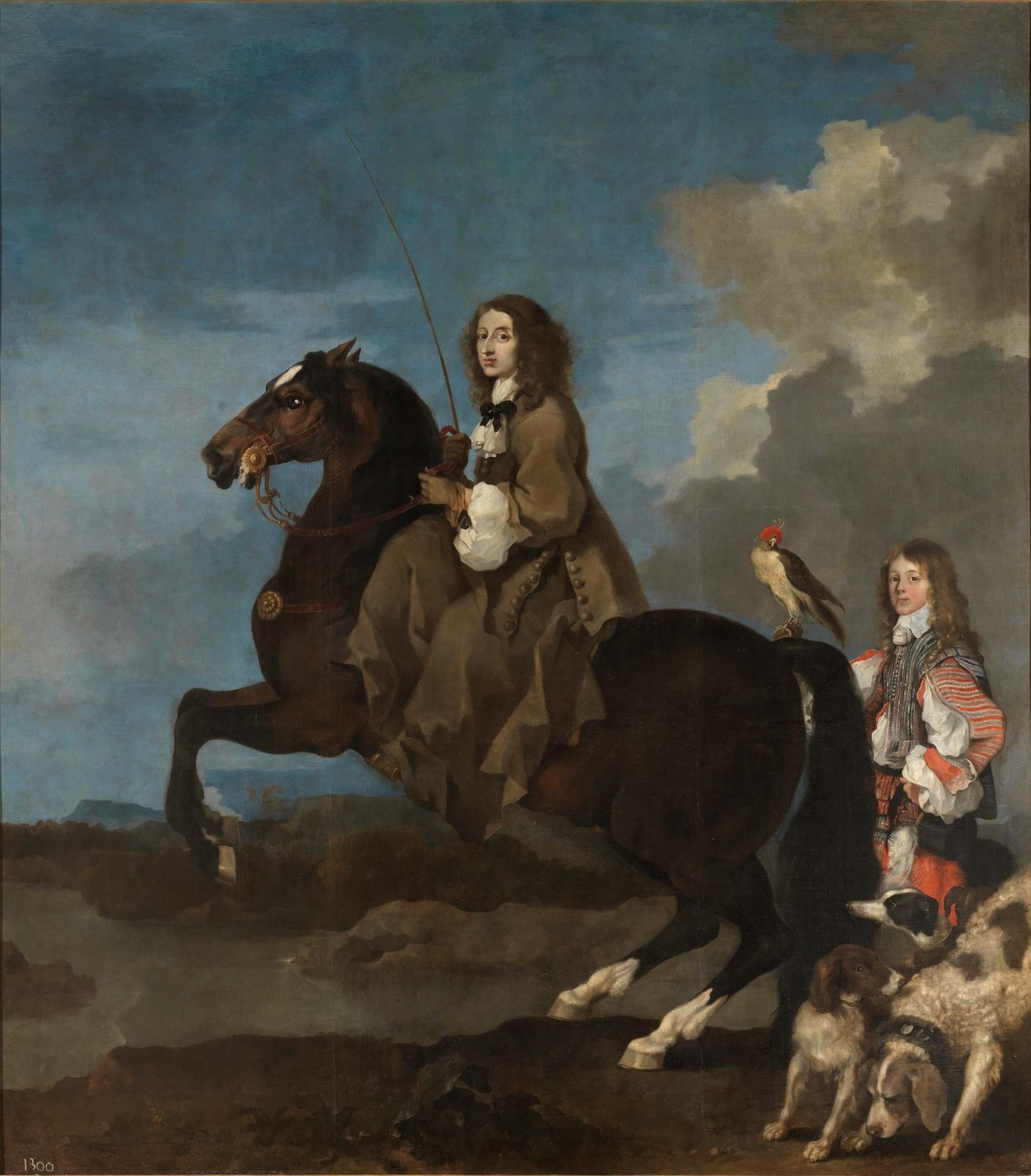
Christina of Sweden, by Sébastien Bourdon (1653). Museo del Prado

Her tutor, Johannes Matthiae, influenced by John Dury and Comenius, who since 1638 had been working on a new Swedish school system, represented a gentler attitude than most Lutherans. In 1644, he suggested a new church order, but it was voted down as this was interpreted as Crypto-Calvinism. Queen Christina defended him against the advice of Chancellor Oxenstierna, but three years later, the proposal had to be withdrawn. In 1647, the clergy wanted to introduce the Book of Concord (Swedish: Konkordieboken) – a book defining correct Lutheranism versus heresy, making some aspects of free theological thinking impossible. Matthiae was strongly opposed to this and was again backed by Christina. The Book of Concord was not introduced.

In 1651, after reigning for almost twenty years, working at least ten hours a day, Christina had a nervous breakdown or burnout. For an hour, she seemed to be dead. She suffered from high blood pressure and complained about bad eyesight and her crooked back. She had already seen many court physicians. (Note: Petrus Kirstenius was invited to become her personal physician in 1636. Grégoire François Du Rietz became the physician in 1642. Around 1645 she appointed Benedict (Baruch) Nehamias de Castro from Hamburg. Johan van Wullen was her physician since 1649. Hermann Conring was invited in 1650, but he seems to have rejected the offer. At some time, Sven Broms and Andreas Sparman were appointed. Du Rietz was called when she suddenly collapsed in 1651. In 1652 it was Pierre Bourdelot. Otto Sperling met Christina in Sweden in the winter of 1653. In July 1654, the English physician Daniel Whistler returned to London. In Rome, Giuseppe Francesco Borri came to see her in 1655, and after 1678 when he was released from prison. Romolo Spezioli was appointed after 1675. Nikolaes Heinsius the Younger arrived in Rome in 1679, when he became her personal physician until about 1687. Cesare Macchiati was her physician until her death.) In February 1652, the French doctor Pierre Bourdelot arrived in Stockholm. Unlike most doctors of that time, he held no faith in blood-letting; instead, he ordered sufficient sleep, warm baths, and healthy meals, in contrast to Christina's hitherto ascetic way of life. She was only twenty-five; and advising that she should take more pleasure in life, Bourdelot asked her to stop studying and working so hard and to remove the books from her apartments.

For years, Christina knew by heart all the poems from the Ars Amatoria and was keen on the works by Martial and Petronius. The physician showed her the 16 erotic sonnets of Pietro Aretino, which he kept secretly in his luggage. By subtle means, Bourdelot undermined her principles. Having been Stoic, she now became an Epicurean. Her mother and de la Gardie were very much against the activities of Bourdelot and tried to convince her to change her attitude towards him; Bourdelot returned to France in 1653 "laden in riches and curses".

The Queen had long conversations about Copernicus, Tycho Brahe, Francis Bacon, and Kepler with Antonio Macedo, secretary and interpreter for Portugal's ambassador. Macedo was a Jesuit, and in August 1651, smuggled on his person a letter from Christina to his general in Rome. (Note: Likely Goswin Nickel rather than Francesco Piccolomini who had died in June of that year.) In reply, Paolo Casati and Francesco Malines, trained in both natural sciences and theology, came to Sweden in the spring of 1652. She had more conversations with them, being interested in Catholic views on sin, the immortality of the soul, rationality, and free will. The two scholars revealed her plans to Cardinal Fabio Chigi. Around May 1652 Christina, raised in the Lutheran Church of Sweden, decided to become Catholic. She sent Matthias Palbitzki to Madrid and King Philip IV of Spain sent the diplomat Antonio Pimentel de Prado to Stockholm in August.

== Abdication ==
On 26 February 1649, Christina announced that she had decided not to marry and instead wanted her first cousin Charles Gustav to be heir to the throne. While the nobility objected to this, the three other estates – clergy, burghers, and peasants – accepted it. She agreed to stay on the condition the councils never again asked her to marry.

In 1651, Christina lost much of her popularity after the beheading of Arnold Johan Messenius, together with his 22-year-old son, who had accused her of serious misbehavior and of being a "Jezebel". According to them "Christina was bringing everything to ruin, and that she cared for nothing but sport and pleasure." The pamphlet also called for her cousin and heir Carl Gustav to organise a coup, kill her and her government. It also included a fictional dialogue between Christina, her court ballet master Antoine de Beaulieu and her Chamberlin about wasting state money on her dances. Also accusations that Ebba Brahe planned to poison Carl, and that Christina was being manipulated by Axel Oxenstierna and Magnus de la Gardie.

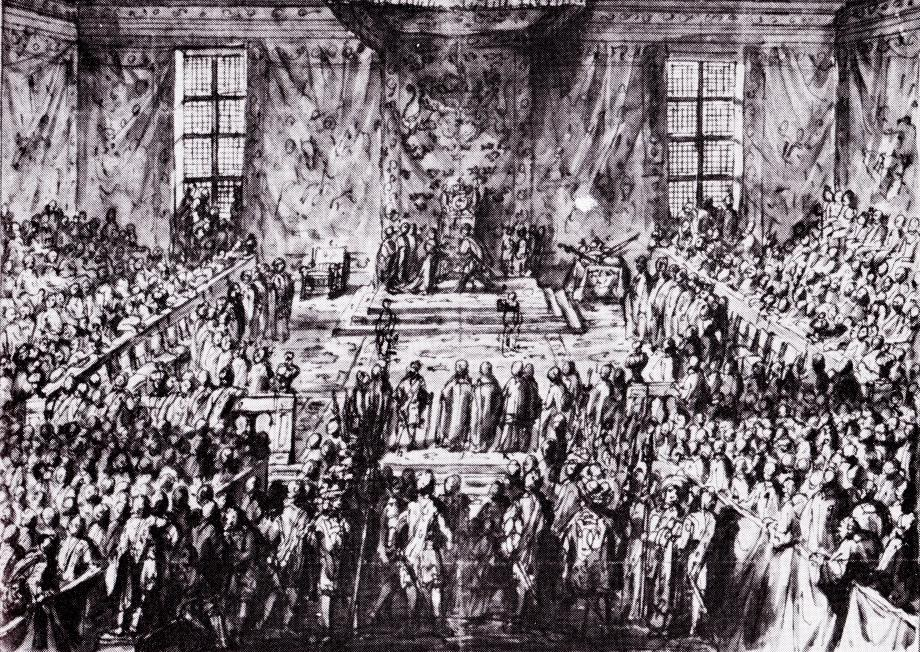
Christina's abdication in 1654, drawing by Erik Dahlberg

In 1653, she founded the Amaranten order. Antonio Pimentel was appointed as its first knight; all members had to promise not to marry (again). In the same year, she ordered Vossius (and Heinsius) to make a list of about 6,000 books and manuscripts to be packed and shipped to Antwerp. In February 1654, she plainly told the Council of her plans to abdicate. Oxenstierna told her she would regret her decision within a few months. Her steadfastness 10 days prior to the abdication ceremony was commended by Bulstrode Whitelocke, commenting, "An act of strange constancy and fixedness of resolution". In May, the Riksdag discussed her proposals. She had asked for 200,000 rikstalers a year but received dominions instead. Financially she was secured through a pension and revenue from the town of Norrköping, the isles of Gotland, Öland, Ösel, and Poel, Wolgast and Neukloster in Mecklenburg, and estates in Pomerania.

Her plan to convert was not the only reason for her abdication, as there was increasing discontent with her arbitrary and wasteful ways. Within ten years, she and Oxenstierna had created 17 counts, 46 barons, and 428 lesser nobles. (Note: The Diet also argued that Oxenstierna's policy of giving away crown lands, in the hope that they would yield more revenue when taxed than when farmed, benefited none but the aristocracy.) To provide these new peers with adequate appanages, they had sold or mortgaged crown property representing an annual income of 1,200,000 rikstalers. During the ten years of her reign, the number of noble families increased from 300 to about 600, rewarding people such as Lennart Torstenson, Louis De Geer and Johan Palmstruch for their efforts. These donations took place with such haste that they were not always registered, and on some occasions, the same piece of land was given away twice.

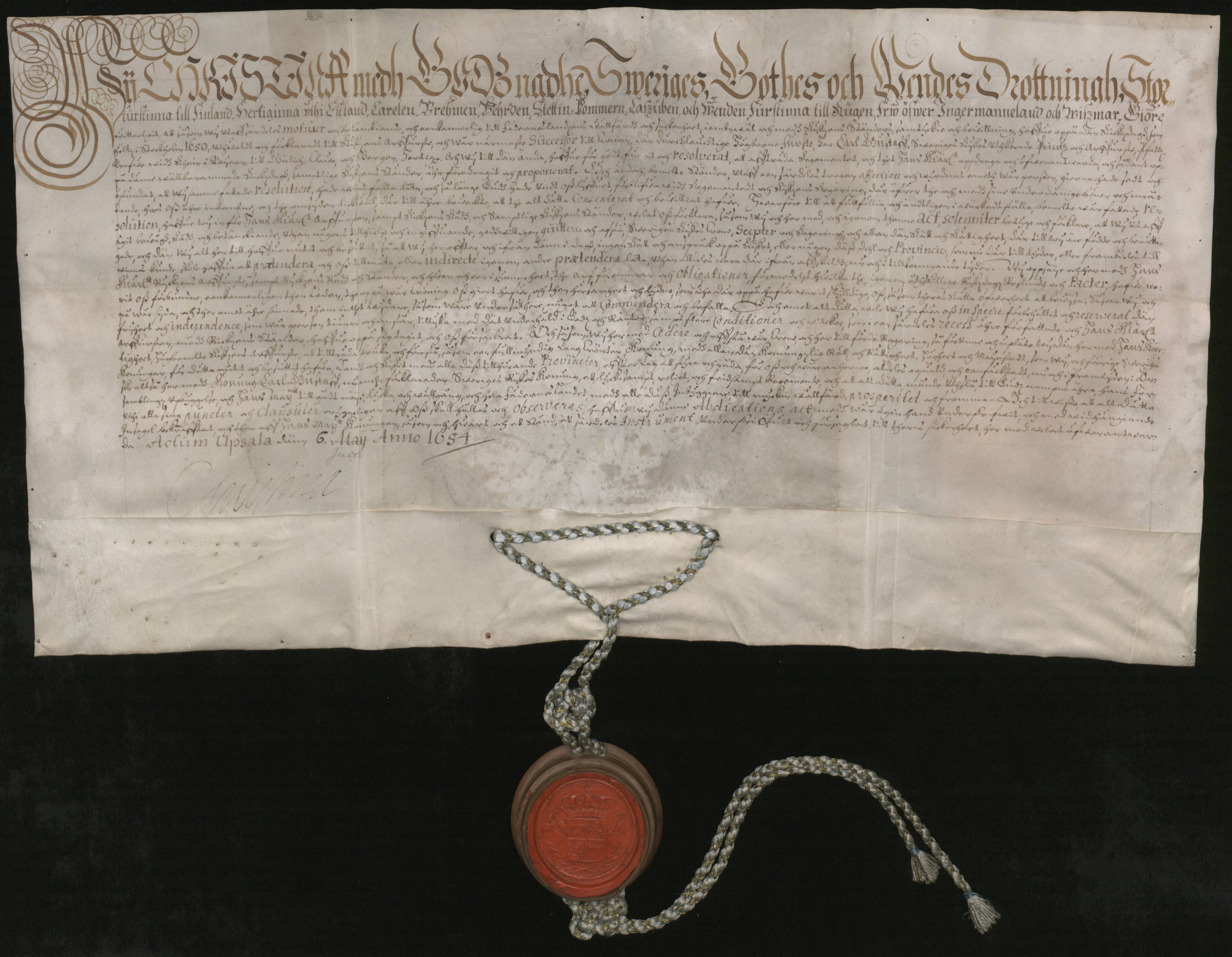
Christina's signature, seal in wooden capsule with gold and blue silk cords. Parchment, 6 June 1654.

Christina abdicated her throne on 6 June 1654 in favor of Charles Gustav. During the abdication ceremony at Uppsala Castle, Christina wore her regalia, which were ceremonially removed from her, one by one. Per Brahe, who was supposed to remove the crown, did not move, so she had to take the crown off herself. Dressed in a simple white taffeta dress, she gave her farewell speech with a faltering voice, thanked everyone, and left the throne to Charles X Gustav, who was dressed in black. Per Brahe felt that she "stood there as pretty as an angel." Charles Gustav was crowned later on that day. Christina left the country within a few days.

== Departure and exile ==
A young Christina, workshop Jacob Ferdinand Voet

In the summer of 1654, Christina left Sweden in men's clothing with the help of Bernardino de Rebolledo and rode as Count Dohna through Denmark. Relations between the two countries were still so tense that a former Swedish queen could not have traveled safely in Denmark. Christina had already packed and shipped abroad valuable books, paintings, statues, and tapestries from her Stockholm castle, leaving its treasures severely depleted.

Christina visited Frederick III, Duke of Holstein-Gottorp and, while there, thought that her successor should have a bride. She sent letters recommending two of the Duke's daughters to Charles. Based on this recommendation, he married Hedwig Eleonora. On 10 July Christina arrived in Hamburg and stayed with Jacob Curiel at Krameramtsstuben. Christina visited Johann Friedrich Gronovius, and Anna Maria van Schurman in the Dutch Republic.

In August, she arrived in the Southern Netherlands and settled down in Antwerp. For four months Christina was lodged in the mansion of a Jewish merchant. She was visited by Archduke Leopold Wilhelm of Austria; the Prince de Condé, the ambassador Pierre Chanut, as well as the former governor of Norway, Hannibal Sehested. In the afternoons, she went for a ride, and each evening, parties were held; there was always a play to watch or music to listen to. Christina quickly ran out of money and had to sell some of her tapestries, silverware, and jewelry. When her financial situation did not improve, the archduke invited her to his Brussels palace on Coudenberg. On 24 December 1654, she converted to the Catholic faith in the archduke's chapel in the presence of the Dominican Juan Guêmes, Raimondo Montecuccoli and Pimentel. Baptized as Kristina Augusta, she adopted the name Christina Alexandra. (Note: Alexandra was a confirmation name in 1654, chosen in honor of the reigning pope, Alexander VII, and one of her heroes, Alexander the Great. The pope had urged her to also add "Maria" in honor of the Virgin, but she refused.) She did not declare her conversion in public, in case the Swedish council might refuse to pay her alimony. In addition, Sweden was preparing for war against Pomerania, which meant that her income from there was considerably reduced. The pope and Philip IV of Spain could not support her openly either, as she was not publicly a Catholic yet. Christina succeeded in arranging a major loan, leaving books and statues to settle her debts.

In September, she left for Italy with her entourage of 255 persons and 247 horses. The pope's messenger, the librarian Lucas Holstenius, himself a convert, waited for her in Innsbruck. On 3 November 1655, Christina announced her conversion to Catholicism in the Hofkirche and wrote to Pope Alexander VII and her cousin Charles X about it. To celebrate her official conversion, L'Argia, an opera by Antonio Cesti, was performed. Ferdinand Charles, Archduke of Austria, already in financial trouble, is said to have been almost ruined by her visit. Her departure was on 8 November.

=== Setting off to Rome ===
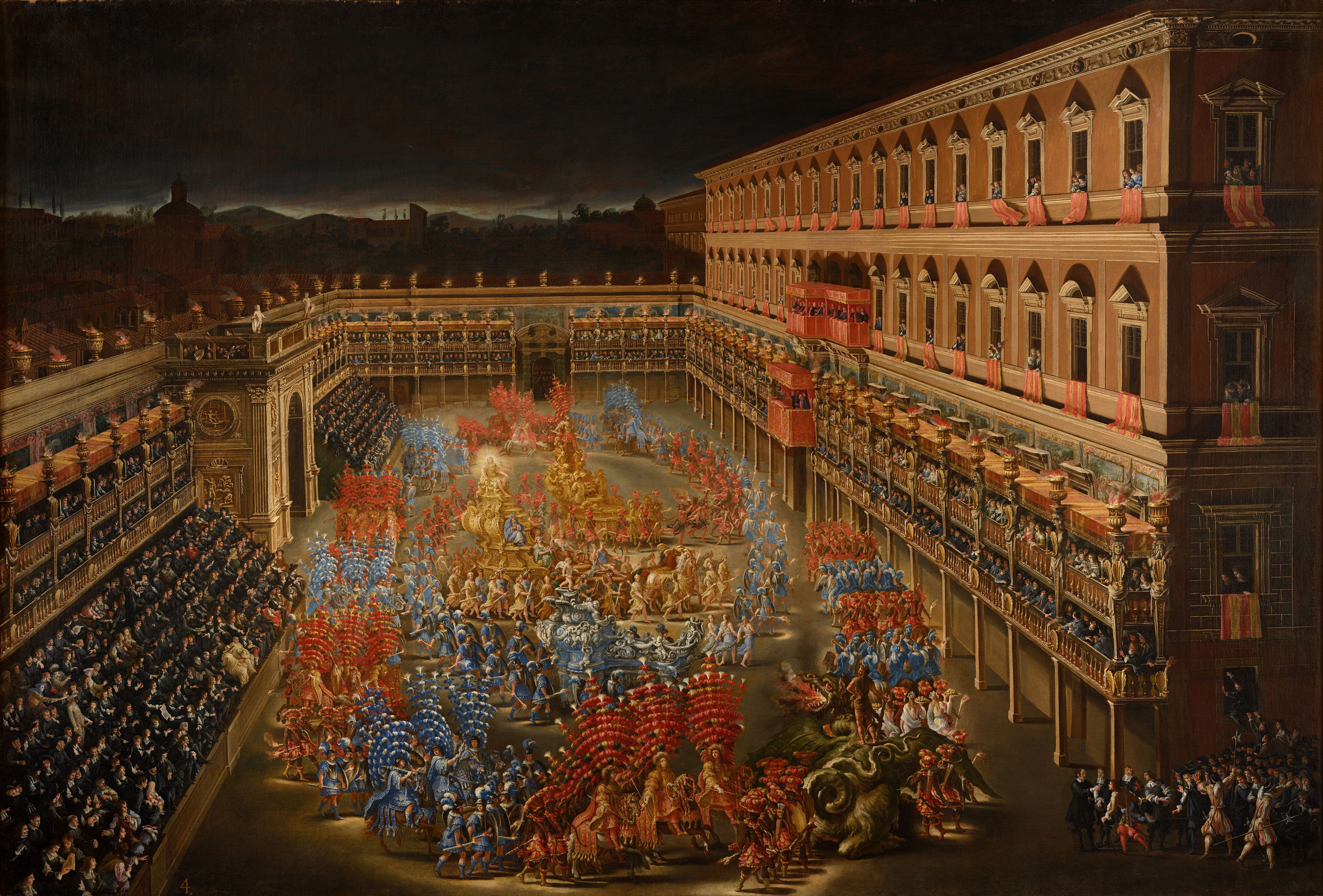
Celebrations for Christina at Palazzo Barberini on 28 February 1656

The southbound journey through Italy was planned in detail by the Vatican and included brilliant triumphs in Ferrara, Bologna, Faenza and Rimini. In Pesaro, Christina became acquainted with the handsome brothers Santinelli, who so impressed her with their poetry and adeptness of dancing that she took them into service, as well as a certain Gian Rinaldo Monaldeschi. The official entry into Rome took place on 20 December, in a sedan chair designed by Bernini through Porta Flaminia, which today is known as Porta del Popolo. (Note: Bernini had decorated the gate with Christina's coat of arms (an ear of corn) beneath that of Pope Alexander (six mountains with a star above). Also today one can read the inscription Felici Faustoq Ingressui Anno Dom MDCLV ("to a happy and blessed entry in the year 1655").) Christina met Bernini on the next day, she invited him to her apartment the same evening and they became lifelong friends. "Two days afterwards she was conducted to the Vatican Basilica, where the pope gave her confirmation. It was then that she received from the pope her second name of Alexandra, the feminine form of his own." She was granted her own wing inside the Vatican, decorated by Bernini.

Christina's visit to Rome was the triumph of Pope Alexander VII and the occasion for extravagant Baroque festivities. For several months, she was focused on by the Pope and his court. The nobles vied for her attention and treated her to a never-ending round of fireworks, jousts, mock duels, acrobatics, and operas. On 31 January Vita Humana an opera by Marco Marazzoli was performed. At the Palazzo Barberini, where she was welcomed on 28 February by a few hundred privileged spectators, she watched a reportedly extraordinary carousel in the courtyard.

=== Palazzo Farnese ===
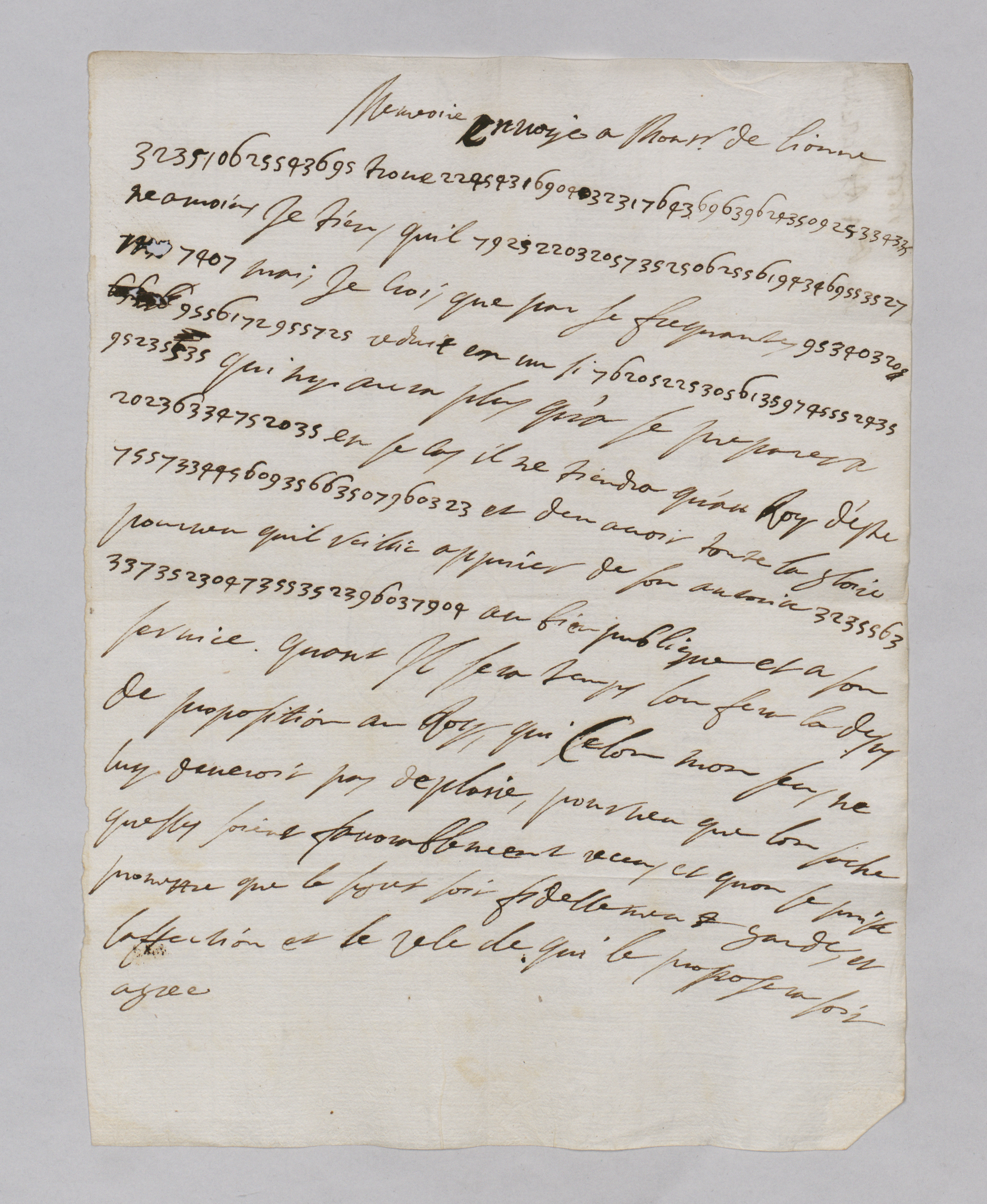
Letter from Queen Christina to Decio Azzolino in the National Archives of Sweden

Christina finally settled down in the Palazzo Farnese, which belonged to the Duke of Parma. Every Wednesday she held the palace open to visitors from the higher classes who kept themselves busy with poetry and intellectual discussions. Christina opened an academy in the palace on 24 January 1656, called Academy of Arcadia, where the participants enjoyed music, theater, and literature. The poet Reyer Anslo was presented to her. Belonging to the Arcadia-circle was also Francesco Negri, a Franciscan from Ravenna who is regarded as the first tourist to visit North Cape, Norway. (Note: Negri wrote eight letters about his walk through Scandinavia all the way up to "Capo Nord" in 1664.) Another Franciscan was the Swede Lars Skytte, who, under the name pater Laurentius, served as Christina's confessor for eight years. (Note: He too had been a pupil of Johannes Matthiae, and his uncle had been Gustavus Adolphus's teacher. As a diplomat in Portugal, he had converted and asked for a transfer to Rome when he learnt of Christina's arrival.)

Twenty-nine-year-old Christina gave occasion to much gossip when socializing freely with men her own age. One of them was Cardinal Decio Azzolino, who had been a secretary to the ambassador in Spain, and responsible for the Vatican's correspondence with European courts. He was also the leader of the Squadrone Volante, the free-thinking "Flying Squad" movement within the Catholic Church. Christina and Azzolino were so close that the pope asked him to shorten his visits to her palace, but they remained lifelong friends. In a letter on 26 January 1676 to Azzolino, Christina writes (in French) that she would never offend God or give Azzolino reason to take offense, but this "does not prevent me from loving you until death, and since piety relieves you from being my lover, then I relieve you from being my servant, for I shall live and die as your slave." As he had promised to remain celibate, his replies were more reserved. (Note: Christina wrote him many letters during her travels. After her death, Azzolino burnt most of their correspondence; about 80 have survived. Some details were written in a code that was decrypted by Carl Bildt, in Rome around 1900.) In the meantime Christina learned that the Swedes had confiscated all her revenue as the princess had become a Catholic.

== Visits to France and Italy ==
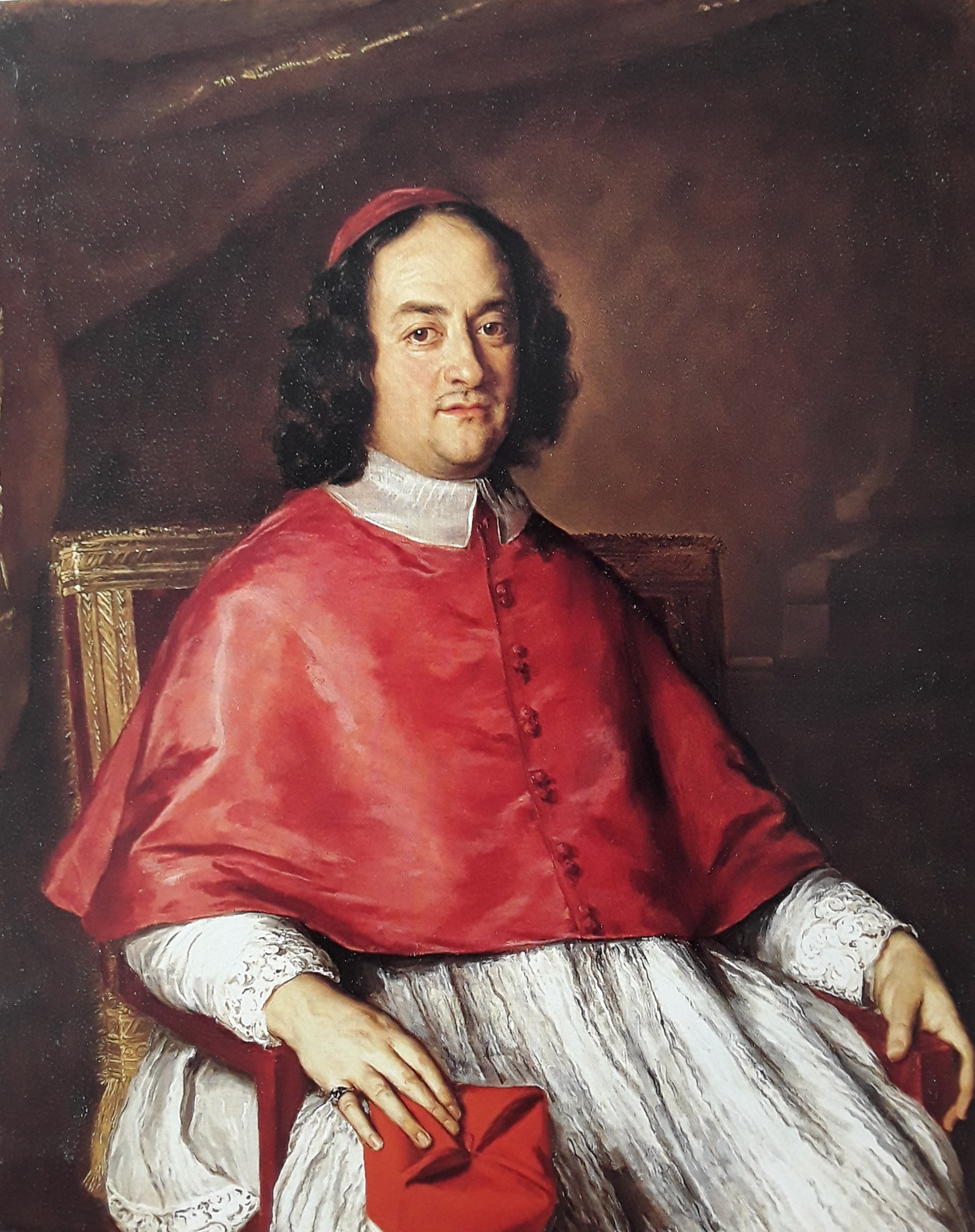
Decio Azzolino by Jacob Ferdinand Voet

King Philip IV of Spain ruled the Duchy of Milan and the Kingdom of Naples. The French politician Mazarin, an Italian himself, had attempted to liberate Naples from Spanish rule, against which the locals had fought before the Neapolitan Republic was created. A second expedition in 1654 had failed and the Duke of Guise gave up. Christina's goal was to become a mediator between France and Spain in their contest to control Naples. Her plan detailed that she would lead French troops to take Naples and rule until bequeathing the crown to France after her death. Christina sent home all her Spanish servants, including her confidant Pimentel and her confessor Guêmes. On 20 July 1656 Christina set sail from Civitavecchia for Marseille where she arrived nine days later. In early August, she traveled to Paris, accompanied by the Duke of Guise. Mazarin gave her no official sponsorship but gave instructions that she be celebrated and entertained in every town on her way north.

On 8 September she arrived in Paris and was shown around; ladies were shocked by her masculine appearance and demeanor and the unguarded freedom of her conversation. When visiting the ballet with la Grande Mademoiselle, she, as the latter recalls, "surprised me very much – applauding the parts which pleased her, taking God to witness, throwing herself back in her chair, crossing her legs, resting them on the arms of her chair, and assuming other postures, such as I had never seen taken but by Travelin and Jodelet, two famous buffoons... She was in all respects a most extraordinary creature".

Christina was treated with respect by the young Louis XIV and his mother, Anne of Austria, in Compiègne. On 22 September 1656, the arrangement between her and Louis XIV was ready. He would recommend Christina as queen to the Kingdom of Naples and serve as guarantor against Spanish aggression. As Queen of Naples, she would be financially independent of the Swedish king, and also capable of negotiating peace between France and Spain. (Note: Mazarin however found another arrangement to ensure peace; he strengthened this with a marriage arrangement between Louis XIV and his first cousin, Maria Theresa of Spain – the wedding took place in 1660. But this was unknown to Christina, who sent different messengers to Mazarin to remind him of their plan.)

On her way back Christina visited French courtesan and author Ninon de l'Enclos in the convent at Lagny-sur-Marne. In early October, she left France and arrived in Turin. During the winter Christina lived in the apostolic palace in Pesaro, probably to flee the plague which infested several regions including Naples. During the Naples Plague (1656) almost half of the population died within two years. In July 1657, she returned to France, either being impatient or not so anxious to become queen of Naples.

=== The death of Monaldeschi ===
On 15 October 1657 apartments were assigned to her at the Palace of Fontainebleau, where she committed an action that stained her memory: the execution of marchese Gian Rinaldo Monaldeschi, her master of the horse and formerly leader of the French party in Rome. For two months she had suspected Monaldeschi of disloyalty; she secretly seized his correspondence, which revealed that he had betrayed her interests. Christina gave three packages of letters to Le Bel, a priest, to keep them for her in custody. Three days later, at one o'clock on Saturday afternoon, she summoned Monaldeschi into the Galerie des Cerfs, discussing the matter and letters with him. He insisted that betrayal should be punished with death. She was convinced that he had pronounced his own death sentence. After an hour or so Le Bel was to receive his confession. Both Le Bel and Monaldeschi entreated for mercy, but he was stabbed by her domestics – notably Ludovico Santinelli – in his stomach and in his neck. Wearing his coat of mail, which protected him, he was chased around in an adjacent room before they finally succeeded in dealing him a fatal wound in his throat. "In the end, he died, confessing his infamy and admitting [Santinelli's] innocence, protesting that he had invented the whole fantastic story in order to ruin [him]."

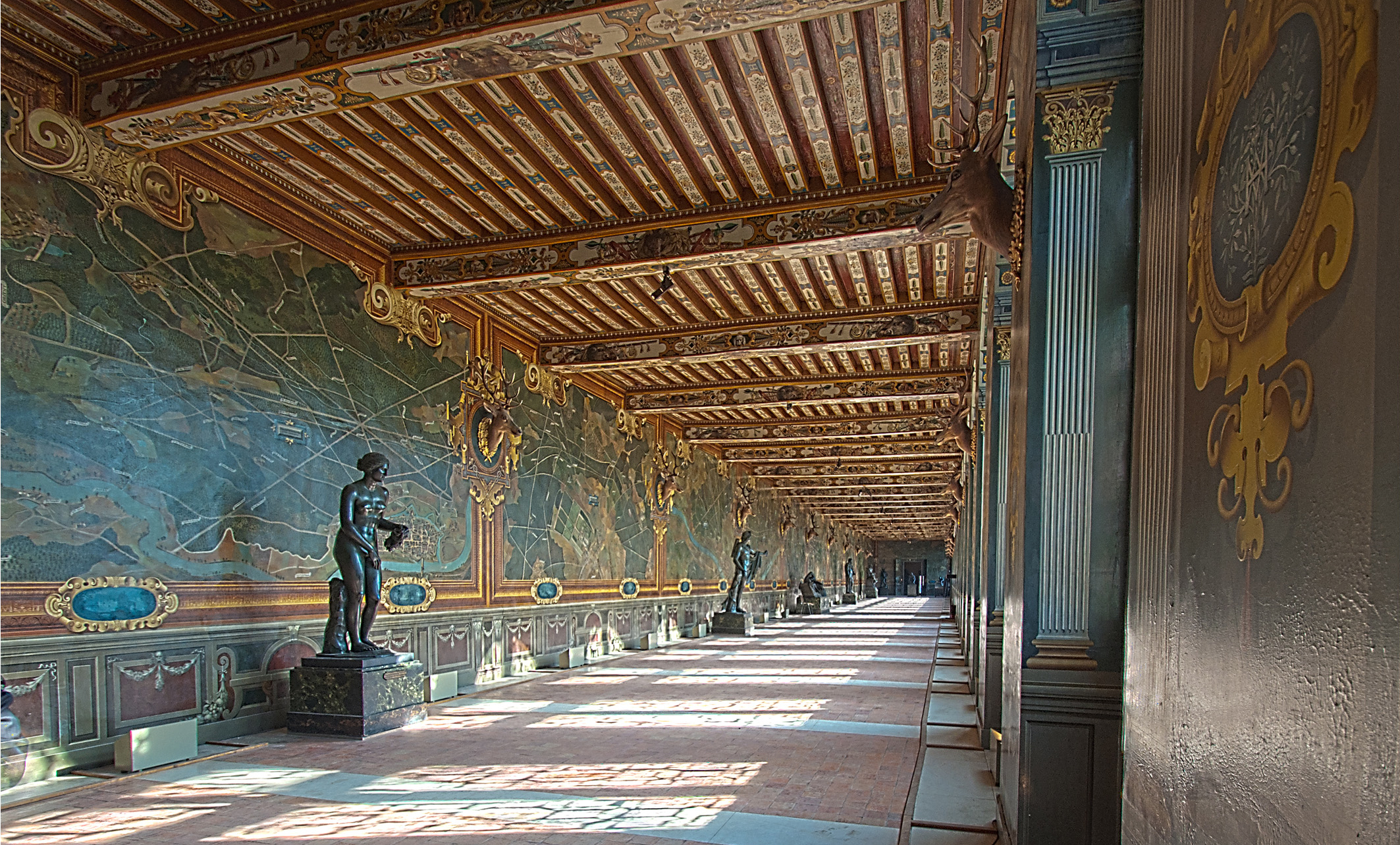
Galerie des Cerfs

Father Le Bel was told to have him buried inside the church, and Christina, seemingly unfazed, paid an abbey to say a number of Masses for his soul. She "was sorry that she had been forced to undertake this execution, but claimed that justice had been carried out for his crime and betrayal.

Mazarin, who had sent her old friend Chanut, advised Christina to place the blame due to a brawl among courtiers, but she insisted that she alone was responsible for the act. She wrote to Louis XIV who two weeks later paid her a friendly visit without mentioning it. In Rome, people felt differently; Monaldeschi had been an Italian nobleman, murdered by a foreign barbarian with Santinelli as one of her executioners. The letters proving his guilt are gone; Christina left them with Le Bel and only he confirmed that they existed. Christina never revealed what was in the letters, but according to Le Bel, it is supposed to have dealt with her "amours", either with Monaldeschi or another person. She herself wrote her version of the story for circulation in Europe.

The killing of Monaldeschi in a French palace was legal, since Christina had judicial rights over the members of her court, as her vindicator Gottfried Leibniz claimed. As her contemporaries saw it, Christina as queen had to emphasize right and wrong, and her sense of duty was strong. She continued to regard herself as queen regnant all her life.

She would gladly have visited England, but she received no encouragement from Cromwell and stayed in Fontainebleau as nobody else offered her a place. Anne of Austria, the mother of Louis XIV, was impatient to be rid of her cruel guest; Christina had no choice but to depart. She returned to Rome and dismissed Santinelli in 1659, claiming to be her ambassador in Vienna without her approval.

== Back to Rome ==
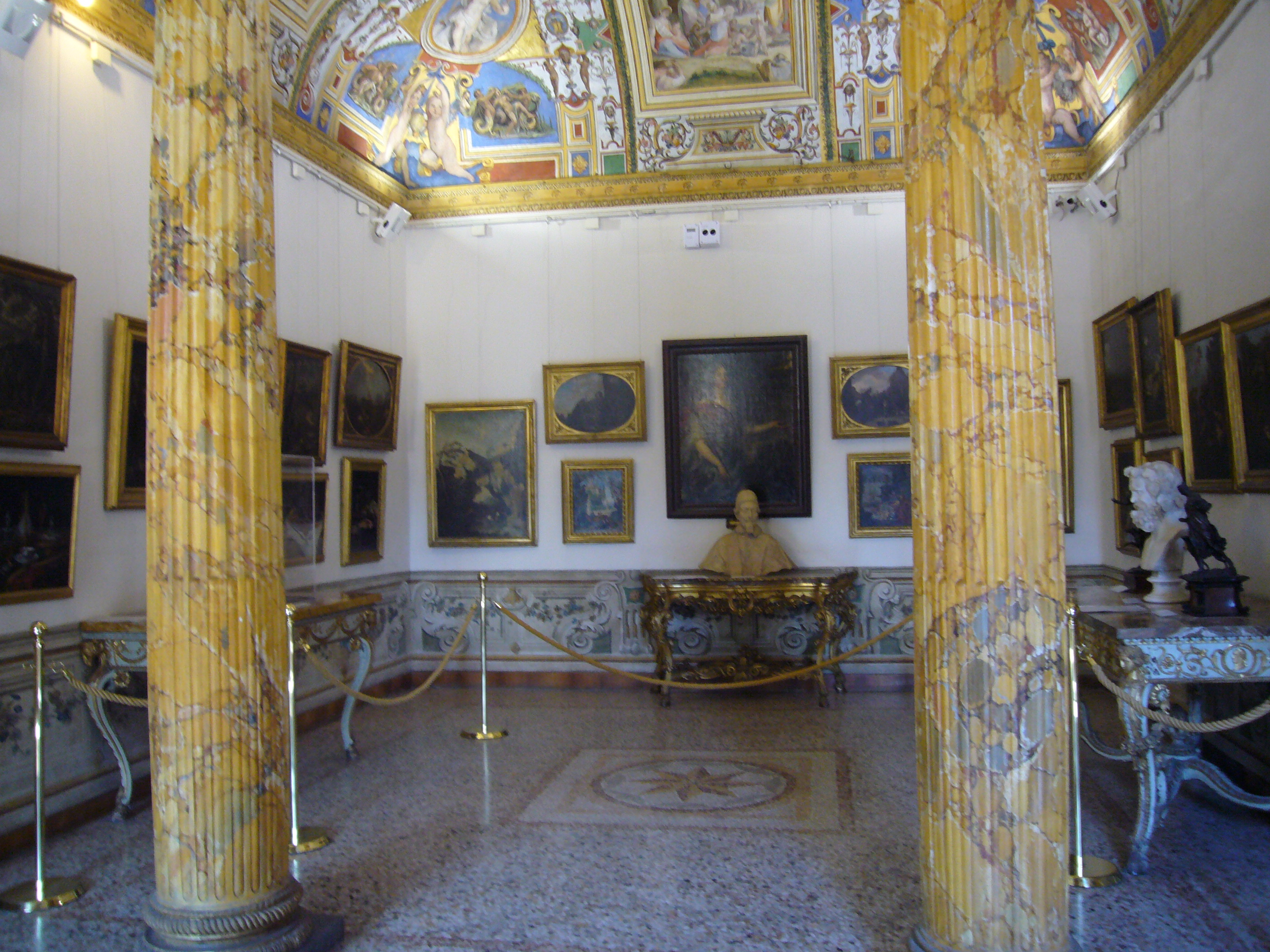
Christina's bedroom in the Palazzo Corsini, a later development of the Palazzo Riario

On 15 May 1658, Christina arrived in Rome for the second time, but this time it was definitely no triumph. With the execution of Monaldeschi, her popularity was lost. Pope Alexander VII remained in his summer residence and wanted no further visits from her. He described her as 'a woman born of a barbarian, barbarously brought up and living with barbarous thoughts ... with a ferocious and almost intolerable pride'. She began examining her past life and started with her autobiography. Christina stayed at the Palazzo Rospigliosi, which belonged to Mazarin, the French cardinal, situated close to the Quirinal Palace; so the pope was enormously relieved when in July 1659, she moved to Trastevere to live in Palazzo Riario, below the Janiculum, designed by Bramante. It was Cardinal Azzolino, her "bookkeeper" who signed the contract, as well as provided her with new servants to replace Francesco Santinelli, who had been Monaldeschi's executioner. (Note: Monaldeschi was a traitor, Santinelli had stolen from Christina' for years.)

The Riario Palace became her home for the rest of her life. She decorated the walls with tapestries by Giovanni Francesco Grimaldi and paintings, mainly from the Venetian School and the Renaissance, while owning comparatively few works by northern European painters, apart from Holbein, Van Dyck and Rubens. Her collections included very little religious subject matter and an abundance of mythological imagery, and it seems that Christina was also much interested in classical history, prompting misbegotten academic speculation about the genuineness of her conversion.

No Roman collection of art could match hers. She owned Correggio's Danaë and two versions of Titian's Venus and Adonis, tapestries, sculpture, medallions, drawings by Raphael, Michelangelo, Caravaggio, Titian, Veronese and Goltzius, as well as portraits of her friends Azzolino, Bernini, Ebba Sparre, Descartes, ambassador Chanut and doctor Bourdelot. Christina also patronised contemporary artists, including the Flemish portrait painter Jacob Ferdinand Voet, known in Rome as Ferdinando de' Ritratti, who painted at least two portraits of the queen during her Roman years.

== Revisiting Sweden ==
Portrait of Christina; painted in 1661 by Abraham Wuchters

In April 1660 Christina was informed that Charles X Gustav had died in February. His son, Charles XI, was only five years old. That summer, she went to Sweden, pointing out that she had left the throne to her first cousin and his descendant, so if Charles XI died, she would take over the throne again. But as she was a Catholic that was impossible, and the clergy refused to let the priests in her entourage celebrate any Masses. Christina left Stockholm and went to Norrköping. Eventually she submitted to a second renunciation of the throne, spending a year in Hamburg to get her finances in order on her way back to Rome. Already in 1654, she had left her income to the banker Diego Teixeira in return for him sending her a monthly allowance and covering her debts in Antwerp. She visited the Teixeira family at Jungfernstieg and entertained them in her own lodgings.

In the summer of 1662, she arrived in Rome for the third time, followed by some fairly happy years. A variety of complaints and allegations made her resolve in 1666 once more to return to Sweden. She proceeded no farther than Norrköping, where she received a decree she was only allowed to settle in Swedish Pomerania. Christina immediately decided to go back to Hamburg. There she was informed that Alexander VII, her patron and tormentor, had died in May 1667. The new pope Clement IX, a victory for the Squadrone Volante, had been a regular guest at her palace. In her delight at his election, she threw a brilliant party at her lodgings in Hamburg, with illuminations and wine in the fountain outside. The party enraged Hamburg's Lutheran populace, and the party ended in a shooting, an attempt to seize the Queen, and her escape in disguise through a back door. Again she met with the freethinker and eye doctor Giuseppe Francesco Borri.

On 16 September 1668, John II Casimir abdicated the Polish–Lithuanian throne and left to France. The Polish monarchy was elective and Christina, as a member of the House of Vasa, put herself forward as a candidate for the throne. She recommended herself being Catholic, an old maid and intended to remain one. She had Pope Clement IX's support; but her failure seemed to please her since this meant that she could return to her beloved Azzolino. She left the city on 20 October 1668.

== Later life ==
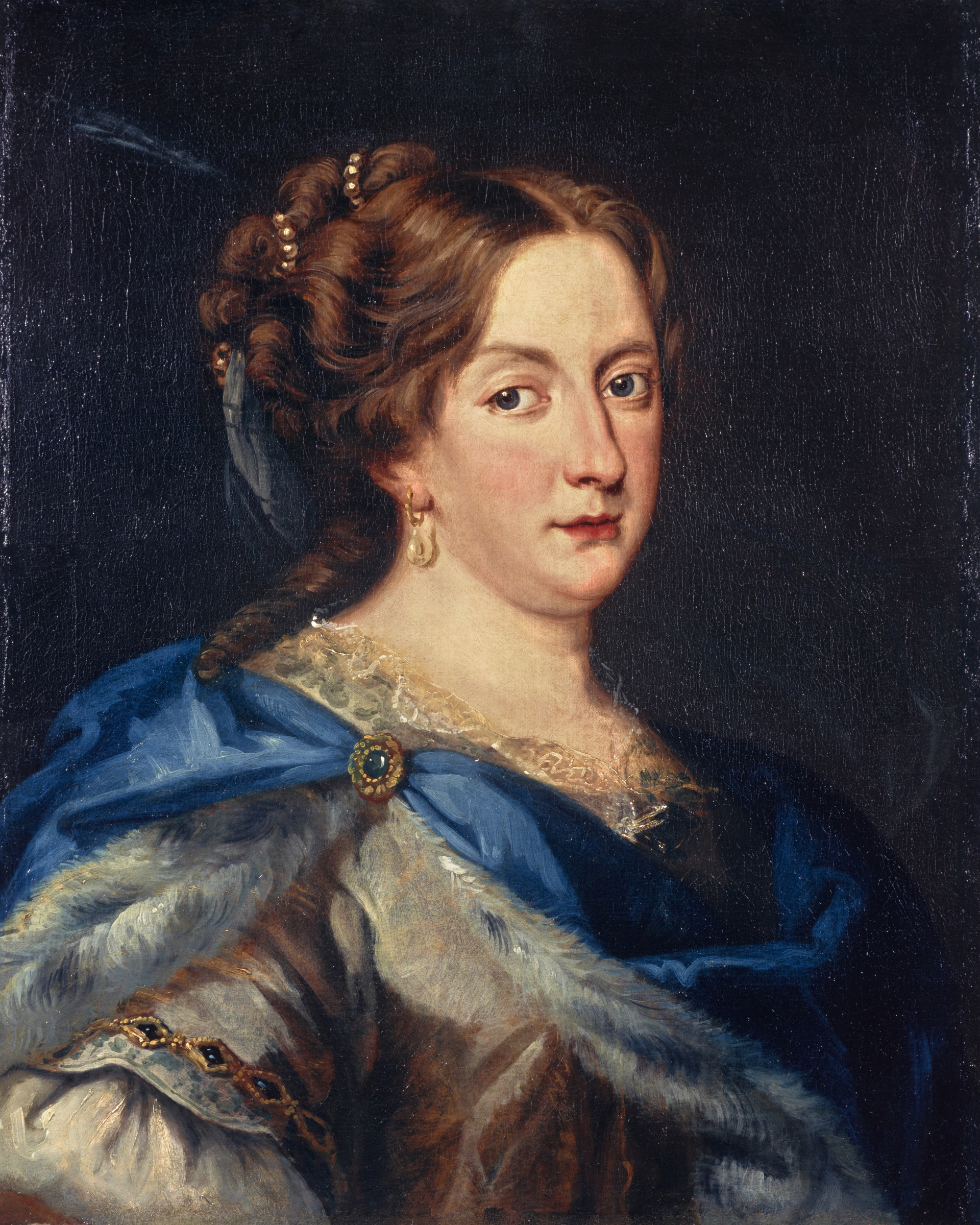
Portrait of Christina by Jacob Ferdinand Voet, c. 1670–1675

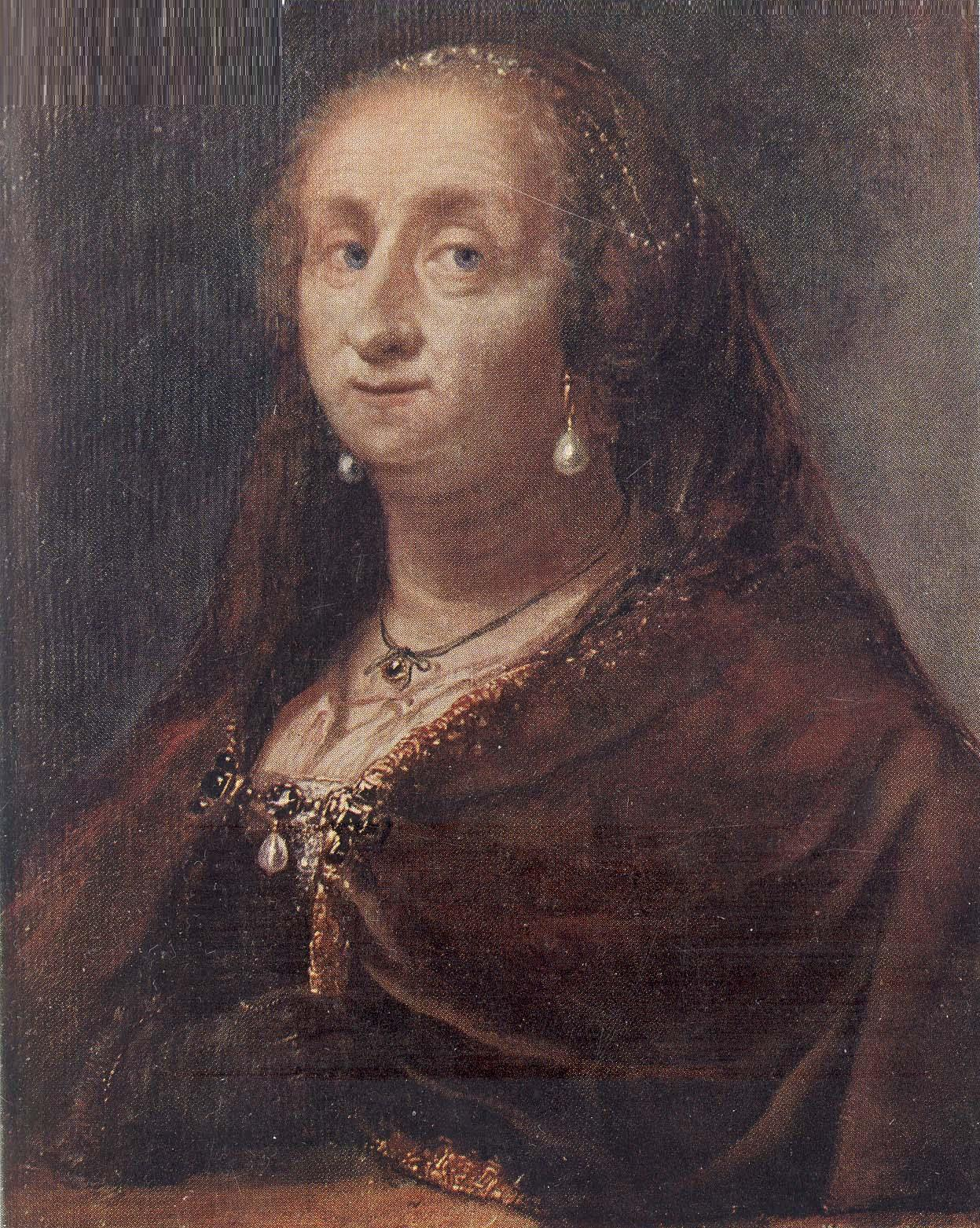
Christina in her later years, c. 1685

Christina at a Banquet Given by Pope Clement IX on 9 December 1668

Christina's fourth and last entry in Rome took place on 22 November 1668. Clement IX often visited her; they had a shared interest in plays. Christina organized meetings of the Accademia in the Great Hall which had ‘a platform for singers and players’. When the pope suffered a stroke, she was among the few he wanted to see at his deathbed. In 1671, Christina established Rome's first public theatre in a former jail, Tor di Nona.

The new pope, Clement X, worried about the influence of theatre on public morals. When Innocent XI became pope, things turned even worse; within a few years he turned Christina's theatre into a storeroom for grain, although he had been a frequent guest in her royal box with the other cardinals. He forbade women to perform with song or acting, and the wearing of decolleté dresses. Christina considered this sheer nonsense, and let women perform in her palace. In 1675, she invited António Vieira to become her confessor. Itinerant doctor Nicolaas Heinsius the Younger, the legitimized son of a former literatus at Christina's court in Stockholm, arrived in Rome in 1679, converted and was appointed the Queen's personal physician until about 1687, providing autobiographical material for his picaresque novel,The Delightful Adventures and Wonderful Life of Mirandor (1695). Christina wrote an unfinished autobiography, of which there are several drafts extant, essays on her heroes Alexander the Great, Cyrus the Great and Julius Cæsar, on art and music (“Pensées, L’Ouvrage du Loisir” and “Les Sentiments Héroïques”) and acted as patron to musicians and poets as Vincenzo da Filicaja. (Note: In her basement there was a laboratory, where she, Giuseppe Francesco Borri and Azzolino experimented with alchemy.) Carlo Ambrogio Lonati and Giacomo Carissimi were Kapellmeister; Lelio Colista luteplayer; Loreto Vittori and Marco Marazzoli singers and Sebastiano Baldini librettist. She had Alessandro Stradella and Bernardo Pasquini to compose for her; Arcangelo Corelli dedicated his first work, Sonata da chiesa opus 1, to her. On 2 February 1687 Corelli or Alessandro Scarlatti directed a tremendous orchestra performing a Pasquini cantata in praise for James II, England's first Catholic monarch since Mary I to welcome Roger Palmer, 1st Earl of Castlemaine as the new ambassador to the Vatican, accompanied by the painter John Michael Wright, who knew Rome and spoke Italian.

In 1656, Christina appointed Carissimi as her maestro di cappella del concerto di camera. Lars Berglund has hypothesized that Christina's early involvement with Italian music when still in Sweden, and in particular church music from Rome, "was likely closely linked to Christina’s self-fashioning strategies and related to the precarious negotiations she was about to embark on as a result of her extraordinary decisions to abdicate, leave the country, convert to Catholicism, and settle in Papal Rome."

Christina's politics and rebellious spirit persisted long after her abdication of power. When Louis XIV revoked the Edict of Nantes, abolishing the rights of French Protestants (Huguenots), Christina wrote an indignant letter, dated 2 February 1686, directed at the French ambassador Cesar d'Estrees. Louis did not appreciate her views, but Christina was not to be silenced. In Rome, she made Pope Clement X prohibit the custom of chasing Jews through the streets during the carnival. On 15 August 1686, she issued a declaration that Roman Jews were under her protection, signed la Regina – the queen.

Christina remained very tolerant towards the beliefs of others all her life. She on her part felt more attracted to the views of the Spanish priest Miguel Molinos, whom she employed as a private theologian. He had been investigated by the Holy Inquisition for proclaiming that sin belonged to the lower sensual part of man and was not subject to man's free will. Christina sent him food and hundreds of letters when he was locked up in Castel Sant'Angelo.

== Death and burial ==
In February 1689, the 62-year-old Christina fell seriously ill after a visit to the temples in Campania, and received the last rites. She suffered from diabetes mellitus. Christina seemed to recover, but in the middle of April she developed an acute streptococcus bacterial infection known as erysipelas, then contracted pneumonia and a high fever. On her deathbed, she sent the pope a message asking if he could forgive her insults. She died on 19 April 1689 in Palazzo Corsini at six in the morning.

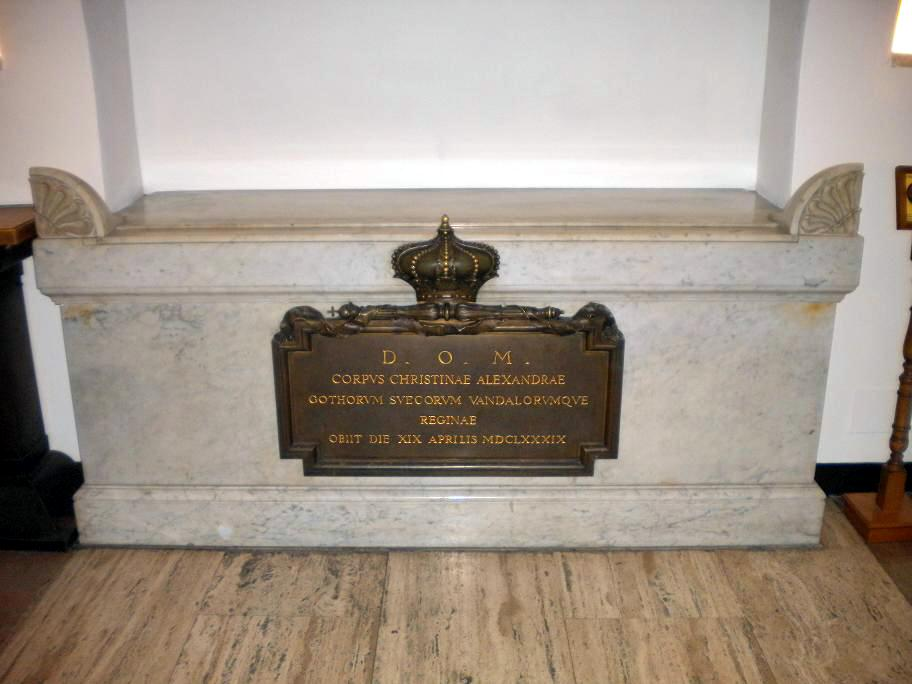
Christina's sarcophagus in the extensive papal crypt at the Vatican

Christina had asked for a simple burial in the Pantheon, Rome, but the pope insisted on her being displayed on a lit de parade for four days in the Riario Palace. She was embalmed, covered with white brocade, a silver mask, a gilt crown, and a scepter. "The Queen wore a thin mantle, decorated with hundreds of crowns and fur bordered with ermine, under this a splendid garment in two pieces, thin gloves and drawers of knitted silk and a pair of elegant textile bootees". In similar fashion to the popes, her body was placed in three coffins – one of cypress, one of lead and finally one made of oak. The funeral procession on 2 May led from Santa Maria in Vallicella to St. Peter's Basilica, where she was buried within the Vatican Grottoes – one of only three women ever given this honor (the other two being Matilda of Tuscany and Maria Clementina Sobieska). Her intestines were placed in a high urn. (Note: From 2005 to 2011, her marble sarcophagus was positioned next to that of Pope John Paul II when his grave was moved.)

In 1702, Clement XI commissioned a monument for the queen, in whose conversion he vainly foresaw a return of her country to the Faith and to whose contribution towards the culture of the city he looked back with gratitude. This monument was placed in the body of the basilica and directed by the artist Carlo Fontana. (Note: Christina was portrayed on a gilt and bronze medallion, supported by a crowned skull. Three reliefs below represented her relinquishment of the Swedish throne and abjugation of Protestantism at Innsbruck, the scorn of the nobility, and faith triumphing over heresy. It is an unromantic likeness, for she is given a double chin and a prominent nose with flaring nostrils.)

Christina had named Azzolino her sole heir to make sure her debts were settled, but he was too ill and worn out even to join her funeral, and died in June the same year. His nephew, Pompeo Azzolino, was his sole heir, and he rapidly sold off Christina's art collections.

== Art collector ==
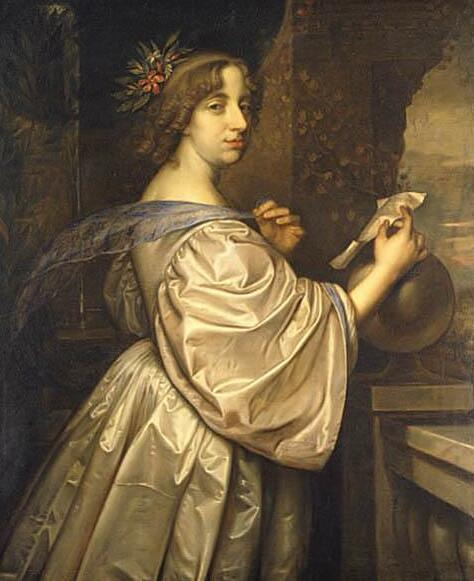
Christina by David Beck

Until 1649, when Christina was twenty-three, the Swedish royal art collection was unimpressive, with good tapestries but for paintings, little more than "about a hundred works by minor German, Flemish, and Swedish painters". But in May 1649, the fabulous loot from the occupation of Prague Castle the previous year arrived, with the pick of the collection amassed by the obsessive collector Rudolph II, Holy Roman Emperor (1552–1612), one of the most important in Europe. Rudolf's bulk purchases had included the famous collection of Emperor Charles V's leading minister Cardinal Granvelle (1517–1586), which he had forced Granvelle's nephew and heir to sell to him. Granvelle had been the "greatest private collector of his time, the friend and patron of Titian and Leoni and many other artists".

Christina was entranced by her new possessions, and remained a keen collector for the rest of her life, and as a female art collector is only exceeded by Catherine the Great of Russia in the Early Modern period. Rudolf had collected old and contemporary works from both Italy and northern Europe, but it was the Italian paintings that excited Christina, and by her death, her collection contained relatively few northern works other than portraits.

Most of the Prague booty remained in Sweden after Christina's departure for exile: she only took about 70 to 80 paintings with her, including about 25 portraits of her friends and family, and some 50 paintings, mostly Italian, from the Prague loot, as well as statues, jewels, 72 tapestries, and various other works of art. She was concerned that the royal collections would be claimed by her successor, and prudently sent them ahead to Antwerp in a ship in August 1653, almost a year before she abdicated, an early sign of her intentions.

Christina greatly expanded her collection during her exile in Rome, for example adding the five small Raphael predella panels from the Colonna Altarpiece, including the Agony in the Garden now reunited with the main panel in New York, which were bought from a convent near Rome. She was apparently given Titian's Death of Actaeon by the greatest collector of the age, Archduke Leopold William of Austria, Viceroy in Brussels – she received many such gifts from Catholic royalty after her conversion, and gave some generous gifts herself, notably Albrecht Dürer's panels of Adam and Eve to Philip IV of Spain (now Prado), likewise seven marble statues of the Muses she acquired from Hadrian's villa in 1670. She also gave away two paintings by Pieter Bruegel the Elder, Dull Gret and The Cripples (now Louvre). In such ways, the balance of her collection shifted to Italian art.

The Riario Palace finally provided a suitable setting for her collection, and the Sala dei Quadri ("Paintings Room") had her finest works, with thirteen Titians and eleven Veroneses, five Raphaels and several Correggios. Titian's Venus Anadyomene was among them. Venus mourns Adonis by Veronese was from Prague, and is now back in Sweden (Nationalmuseum).

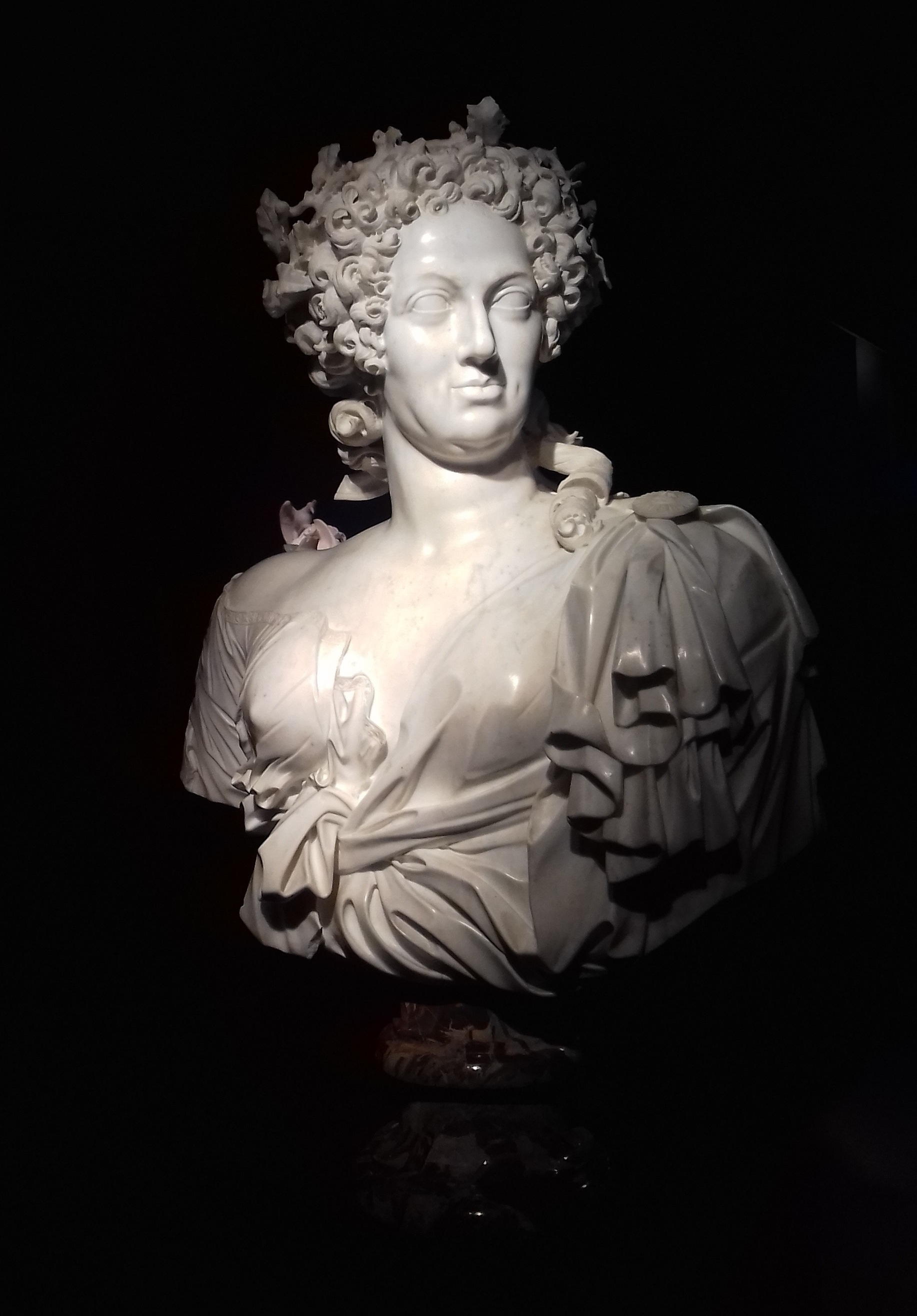
Bust of Christina by Giulio Cartari in Palacio Real de La Granja de San Ildefonso

Christina liked to commission portraits of herself, friends, and also notable people she had not met, from 1647 sending David Beck, her Dutch court painter, to several countries to paint notabilities. She encouraged artists to study her collection, including the drawings, and exhibited some of her paintings, but apart from portraits she commissioned or bought few works by living painters, except for drawings. Sculptors did rather better, and Bernini was a friend, while others were commissioned to restore the large collection of classical sculpture which she had begun to assemble while still in Sweden.

On her death she left her collection to Cardinal Decio Azzolino, who himself died within a year, leaving the collection to his nephew, who sold it to Don Livio Odescalchi, commander of the Papal army, at which point it contained 275 paintings, 140 of them Italian. The year after Odescalchi's death in 1713, his heirs began protracted negotiations with the great French connoisseur and collector Pierre Crozat, acting as intermediary for Philippe II, Duke of Orléans, from 1715 the Regent of France. The sale was finally concluded and the 123 paintings included in the sale were delivered in 1721, forming the core of the Orleans Collection, the paintings from which were mostly sold in London after the French Revolution, with many of them being on display in the National Gallery. The French experts complained that Christina had cut down several paintings to fit her ceilings, and had over-restored some of the best works, especially the Correggios, implicating Carlo Maratti.

At first, removing her collections from Sweden was seen as a great loss to the country; but in 1697, Stockholm castle burned down with the loss of almost everything inside, so they would have been destroyed if they had remained there. Today very few major works from her collection still remain in the country. The sculpture collection was sold to the King of Spain and mostly remains in Spanish museums and palaces. Her large and important library was bought by Alexander VIII for the Vatican Library, while most of the paintings ended up in France, as the core of the Orleans Collection – many remain together in the National Gallery of Scotland. 1700 drawings from her collection (among them works by Michelangelo (25) and Raphael) were acquired in 1790 by Willem Anne Lestevenon for the Teylers Museum in Haarlem, the Netherlands.

== Appearance ==
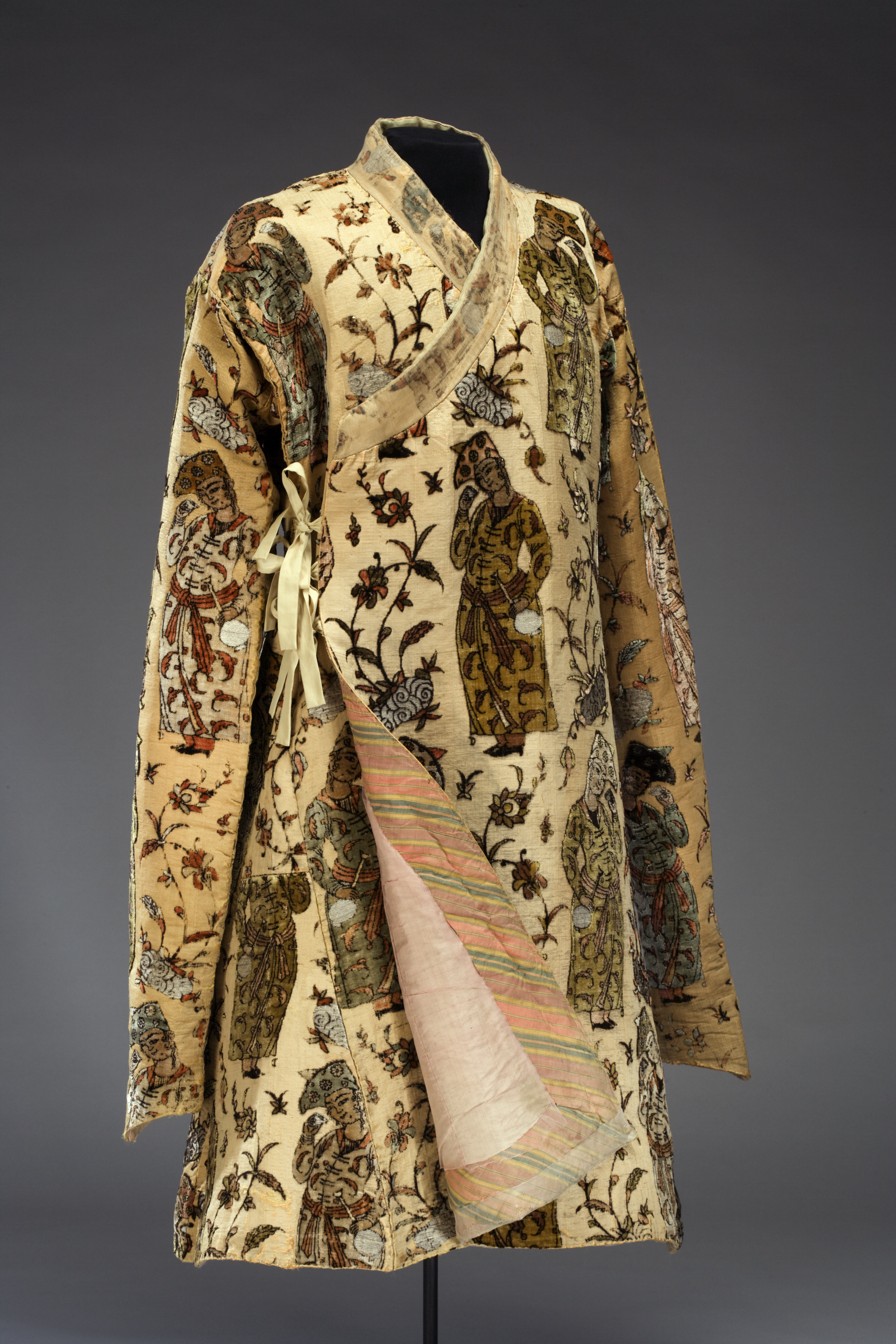
Persian coat owned by Christina, probably woven during the reign of Abbas the Great (1586–1628), preserved in the permanent collection of the Livrustkammaren.

Historical accounts of Christina include regular reference to her physical features, mannerisms and style of dress. Christina was known to have a bent back, a deformed chest, and irregular shoulders. Some historians have speculated that references to her physical attributes may be over-represented in related historiography, thus giving the impression that this was of greater interest to her contemporaries than was actually the case. However, given how influential Christina became in her own era (especially for those in Rome), it is likely her style and mannerisms were at least of general interest to those around her, and this is reflected in many accounts. As a result of conflicting and unreliable accounts (some no better than gossip), the way in which Christina is described, even today, is a matter of debate.

According to Christina's autobiography, the midwives at her birth first believed her to be a boy because she was "completely hairy and had a coarse and strong voice". Such ambiguity did not end with her birth; Christina made cryptic statements about her "constitution" and body throughout her life. Christina also believed a wet nurse had carelessly dropped her to the floor when she was a baby. A shoulder bone broke, leaving one shoulder higher than the other for the rest of her life. (Note: E. Essen-Möller and B. Guilliet suggest it had to do with her alleged intersex condition.) A number of her contemporaries made reference to the differing height of her shoulders.

As a child, Christina's mannerisms could probably best be described as those of a tomboy. Her father insisted she should receive "the education of a prince", and some have interpreted this as acceptance, on the part of the king, that she had masculine features or that there was some form of gender ambiguity in her upbringing. She was educated as a prince and was taught (and enjoyed) fencing, horse riding and bear hunting. She was said to have preferred these masculine hobbies to more feminine ones.

As an adult, it was said that Christina "walked like a man, sat and rode like a man, and could eat and swear like the roughest soldiers". Christina's contemporary John Bargrave described her comportment in a similar fashion but said witnesses ascribed her style more to childishness or madness than masculinity. When she arrived in Rome in 1655, she had shaven her head and wore a big, dark wig. By 1665, according to Edward Browne, she regularly wore a velvet justacorps, cravat, and peruke (man's wig).

While Christina may not have been alone in her own time for choosing masculine dress (Leonora Christina Ulfeldt, for example, was known for dressing the same way), she also had physical features some described as masculine. (Note: Her contemporary Samuel Pepys, for example, describes women riding horses in mannish clothing.) According to Henry II, Duke of Guise, "she wears men's shoes and her voice and nearly all her actions are masculine". When she arrived in Lyon, she again wore a toque and had styled her hair like that of a young man. It was noted that she also wore large amounts of powder and face cream. In one account she "was sunburnt, and she looked like a sort of Egyptian street girl, very strange, and more alarming than attractive".

Living in Rome, she formed a close relationship with Cardinal Azzolino, which was controversial but symbolic of her attraction to relationships that were not typical for a woman of her era and station. She abandoned her manly clothes and took to wearing décolleté dresses so risqué that they drew a rebuke from the Pope.

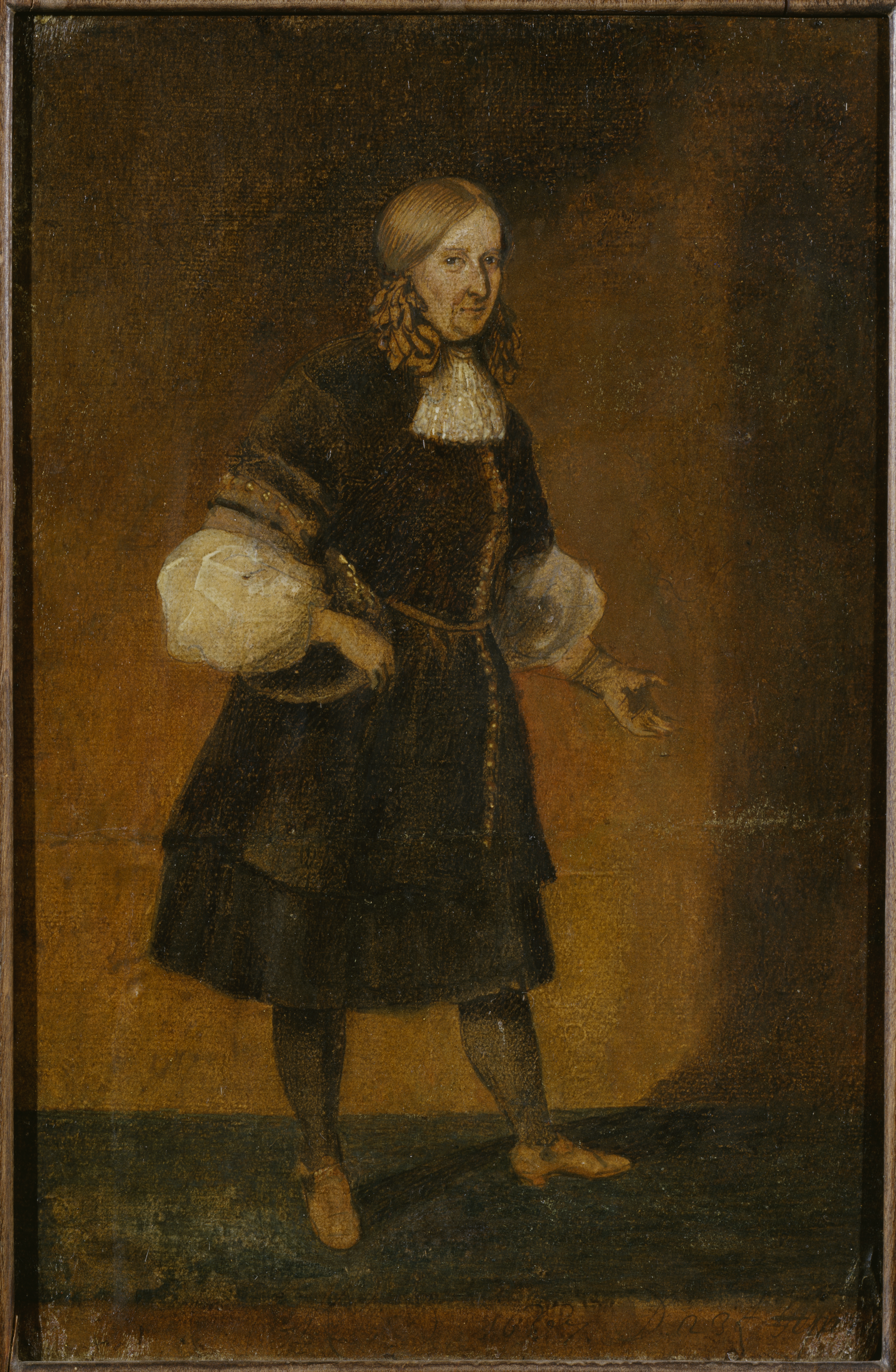
The elderly Christina

As an older woman, Christina's style changed a little. François Maximilian Misson (visiting Rome in the spring of April 1688) wrote:

She is over sixty years of age, very small of stature, exceedingly fat, and corpulent. Her complexion and voice and face are those of a man. She has a big nose, large blue eyes, blonde eyebrows, and a double chin from which sprout several tufts of beard. Her upper lip protrudes a little. Her hair is a light chestnut colour, and only a palms breadth in length; she wears it powdered and standing on end, uncombed. She is very smiling and obliging. You will hardly believe her clothes: a man's jacket, in black satin, reaching to her knees, and buttoned all the way down; a very short black skirt, and men's shoes; a very large bow of black ribbons instead of a cravat; and a belt drawn tightly under her stomach, revealing its rotundity all too well.

=== Gender ambiguity and sexuality ===
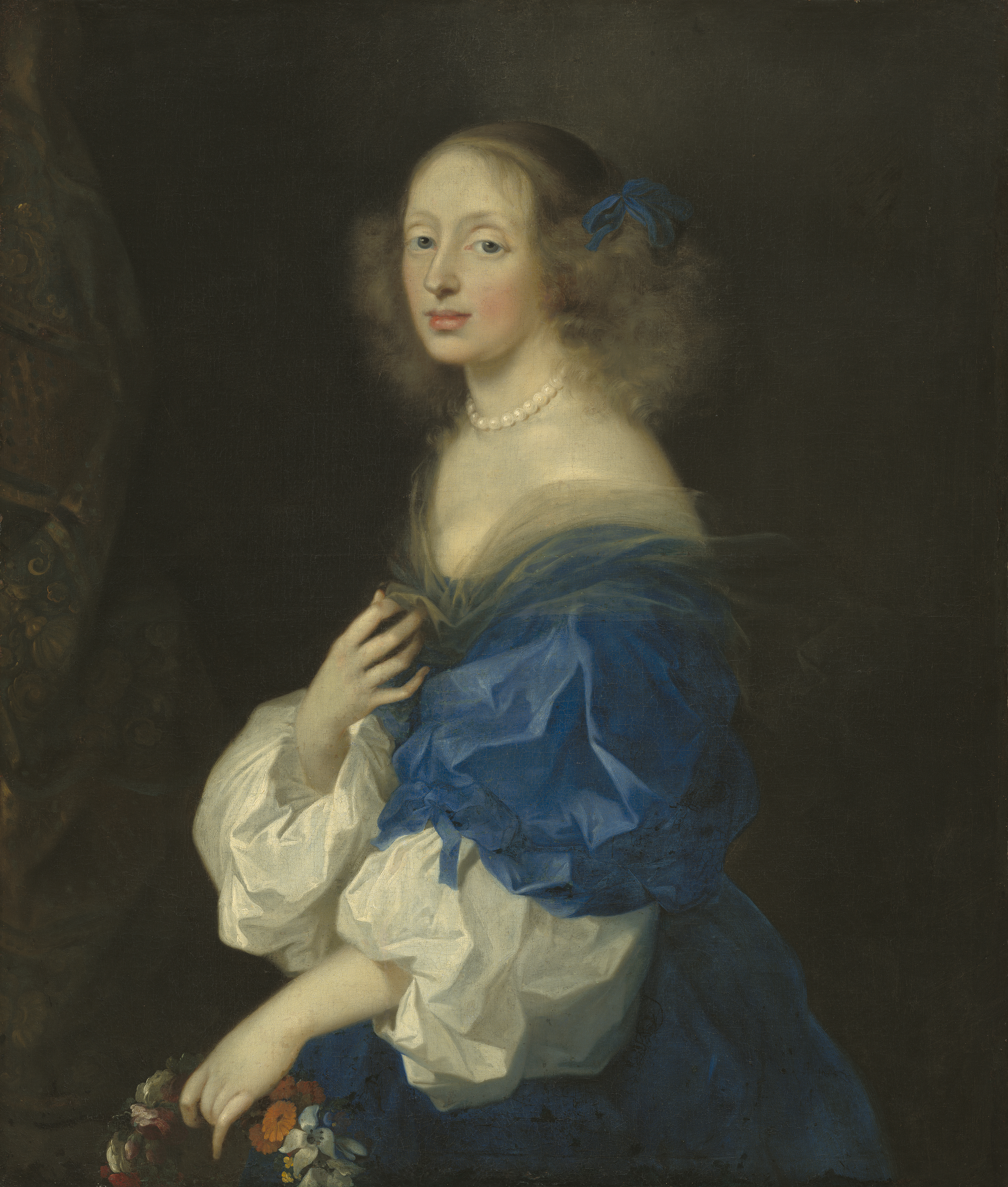
Ebba Sparre married in 1652 a brother of Magnus Gabriel de la Gardie. Painting by Sébastien Bourdon

The question of Christina's sexuality has been debated, even as a number of modern biographers generally consider her to have been a lesbian, and her relationships with women were noted during her lifetime. Christina seems to have written passionate letters to Ebba Sparre, and Guilliet suggested relationships between Christina and Gabrielle de Rochechouart de Mortemart; Rachel, a niece of Diego Teixeira; and the singer Angelina Giorgino. When she was introduced to Marquise Elisabeth de Castellane, she is quoted as saying, if she was a man, she would "fall at your feet, submissive and languishing with love." Some historians assert she maintained heterosexual, non-sexual, lesbian, or bisexual relationships during the course of her life depending on which source is consulted. According to Veronica Buckley, Christina was a "dabbler" who was "painted a lesbian, a prostitute, a hermaphrodite, and an atheist" by her contemporaries, though "in that tumultuous age, it is hard to determine which was the most damning label". Christina wrote near the end of her life that she was "neither Male nor Hermaphrodite, as some People in the World have pass'd me for".

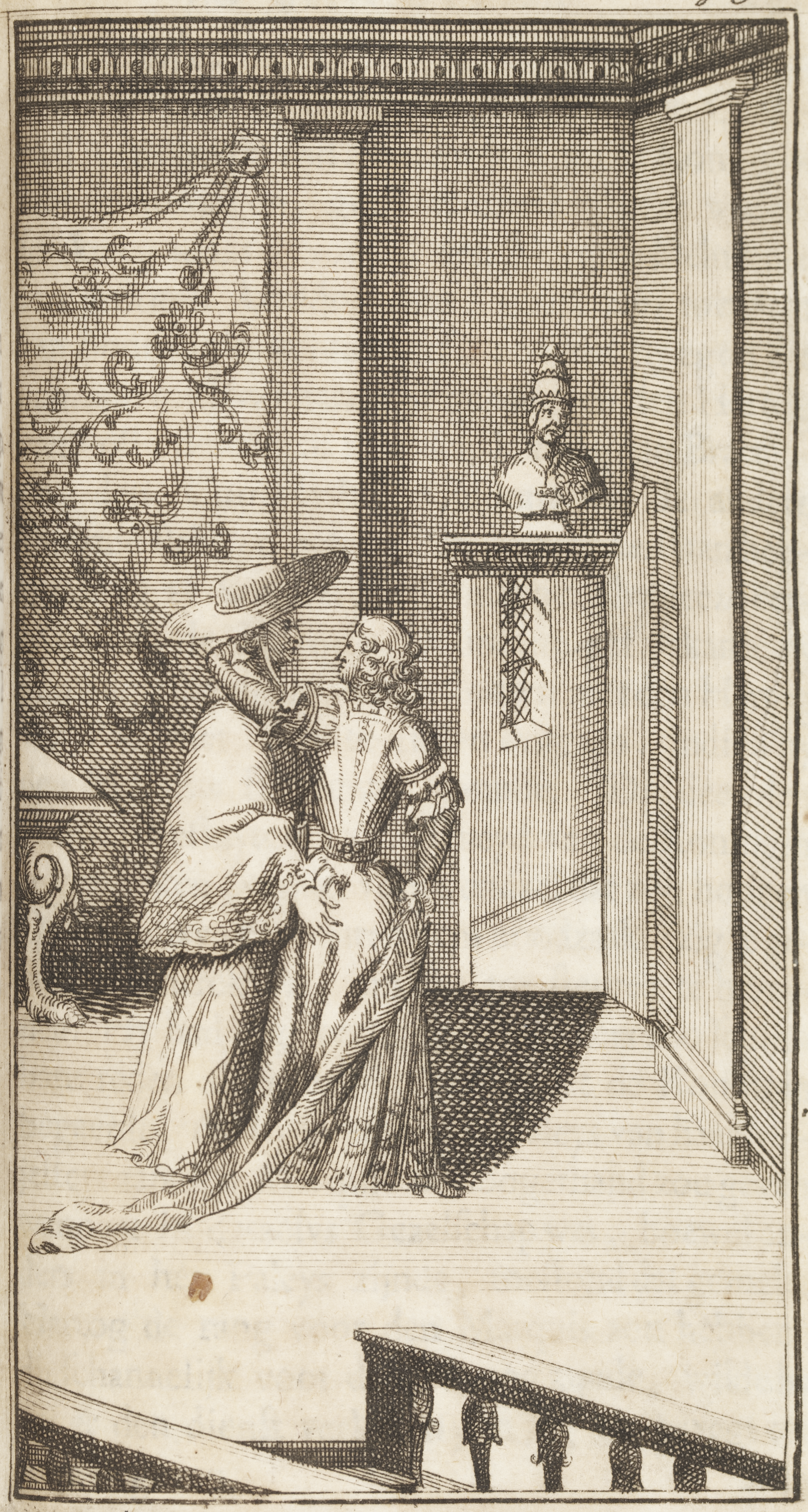
Christina with Cardinal Azzolino in an engraving from "Het leven en bedryf van Christina"

Bargrave recounted that Christina's relationship with Azzolino was both "familiar" (intimate) and "amorous" and that Azzolino had been sent (by the Pope) to Romania as punishment for maintaining it. Buckley, on the other hand, believed there was "in Christina a curious squeamishness with regard to sex" and that "a sexual relationship between herself and Azzolino, or any other man, seems unlikely". Based on historical accounts of Christina's physicality, some scholars believe that she may have been an intersex individual.

In 1965, these conflicting accounts led to an investigation of Christina's remains. Physical anthropologist and anatomist Carl-Herman Hjortsjö, who undertook the investigation, explained: "Our imperfect knowledge concerning the effect of intersex on the skeletal formation ... makes it impossible to decide which positive skeletal findings should be demanded upon which to base the diagnosis [of an intersex condition]." Nevertheless, Hjortsjö speculated that Christina had reasonably typical female genitalia because it is recorded by her physicians Bourdelot and Macchiati that she menstruated. Hjortsjö's osteological analysis of Christina's skeleton led him to state that they were of a "typically female" structure.

Some of the symptoms could be due to polyendocrine metabolic ovarian syndrome, a complex multi-endocrine disorder including hirsutism (male pattern/type hair growth) due to increased androgen hormone levels, and abdominal obesity due to the hormone insulin receptor defects. Buckley suggested that her low comprehension of the need for most social norms, little desire to act, dress, or do other social norms, and her preference to wear, act, and do only that which she deemed logically practical, point to her having a pervasive developmental disorder, such as autism.

== Legacy ==
=== Depictions ===
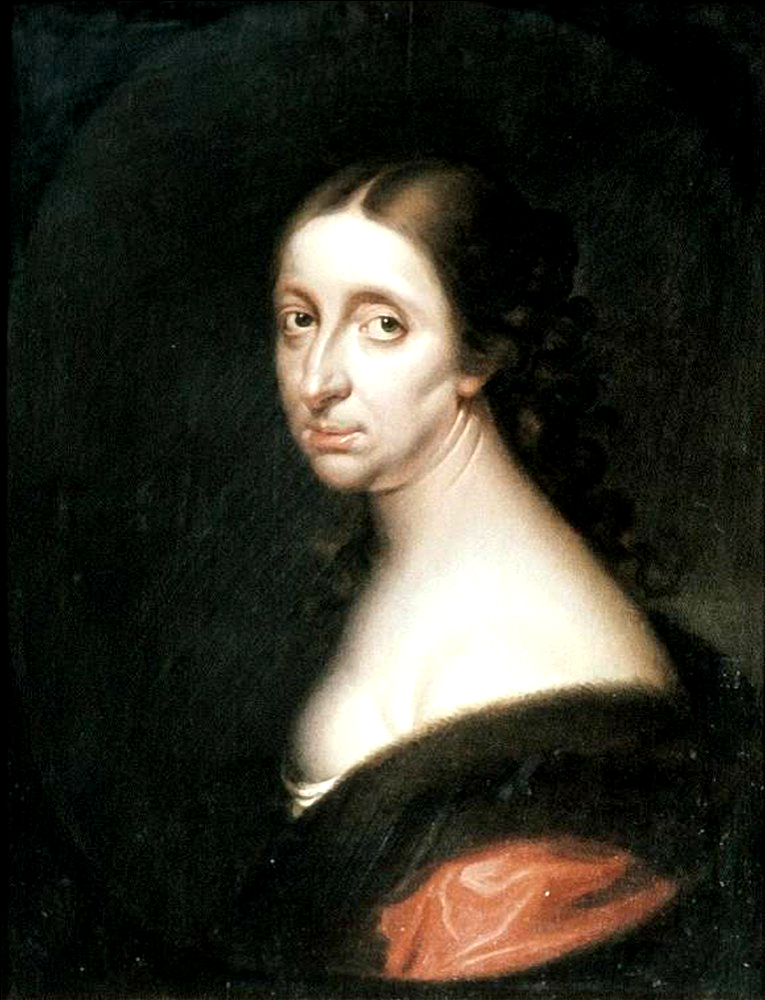
Ritratto di Cristina di Svezia by Abraham Wuchters

The complex character of Christina has inspired numerous plays, books, and operatic works, including:

==== 19th century ====
- Jacopo Foroni's 1849 opera Cristina, regina di Svezia is based on the events surrounding her abdication. Operas based on her life include Alessandro Nini's Cristina di Svezia (1840), Giuseppe Lillo's Cristina di Svezia (1841), and Sigismond Thalberg's Cristina di Svezia (1855)
- Finnish historical novelist Zacharias Topelius wrote in Swedish the allegorical story Stjärnornas Kungabarn (Royal Children of the Stars) - the first part, Nattens barn (Night's Child, 1899) takes place during the reign of Queen Christina of Sweden.(eGutenburg collection of Topelius)

==== 20th century ====
- August Strindberg's play Kristina (1901) centers on the final day of her reign. It was adapted for radio, most famously by Sweden's national radio in 1964. Sveriges Radio 1964 production of "Kristina"
- Christina's life was fictionalized in the classic feature film Queen Christina (1933). This film, starring Greta Garbo, depicted a heroine whose life diverged considerably from that of the real Christina.
- In the Italian film Love and Poison (1950/52) Christina is played by actress Lois Maxwell.
- Kaari Utrio published Kartanonherra ja kaunis Kristin (1969).
- In The Abdication (1974), starring Liv Ullmann, Christina arrives in the Vatican and falls in love with cardinal Azzelino. The script was based on a play by Ruth Wolff.
- Herta J. Enevoldsen wrote two novels in Danish on her life, Heltekongens Datter (1975) and En Dronning Værdig (1976).

==== 21st century ====
- Laura Ruohonen wrote "Queen C" (2003), which presents a woman centuries ahead of her time who lives by her own rules.
- In Eric Flint's alternative history 1632 series (begun in 2000) she is a major character.
- Comedian Jade Esteban Estrada portrayed her (2004) in the solo musical ICONS: The Lesbian and Gay History of the World Vol. 2.
- Michel Marc Bouchard's 2012 play Christina, The Girl King, is a fictional depiction of Queen Christina's short rule and her queer identity, adapted also for Mika Kaurismäki's film in 2015 and for the Canadian French-language opera "La reine-garçon" in 2024; in the former Christina is played by Swedish actress Malin Buska, fictionalised as the lesbian lover of Countess Ebba Sparre.
- In 2019 she was featured as the leader of the Swedish civilization, Kristina, in the video game expansion pack Civilization VI: Gathering Storm. She was depicted as having a strong focus on culture and art.
- La Reine-garçon, an all-Canadian adaptation of Christina's life into opera created by composer Julien Bilodeau and playwright Michel Marc Bouchard (2012's Christina the Girl-King) was jointly commissioned by the Canadian Opera Company and L'opéra de Montréal.

=== Geography and Toponymy ===
In 1636–1637, Peter Minuit and Samuel Blommaert negotiated with the government to found New Sweden, the first Swedish colony in the New World where, in 1638, Minuit erected Fort Christina in what is now Wilmington, Delaware. The Christina River in Delaware was also named after her.

In the state of Pennsylvania, the Queen Village neighborhood in Center City, Philadelphia is named for her.

- Kristiine District of Tallinn, Estonia.
- Kristinestad, Finland.

== Family tree ==
Charles IX
Maria Eleonora	Gustavus Adolphus	Catherine	John Casimir	Carl Gyllenhielm
Christina	Charles X Gustav

== Bibliography ==
- Åkerman, S. (1991). Queen Christina of Sweden and her circle : the transformation of a seventeenth century philosophical libertine. New York: E.J. Brill. ISBN 978-90-04-09310-2.
- Buckley, Veronica (2004). Christina; Queen of Sweden. London: Harper Perennial. ISBN 978-1-84115-736-8.
- Clarke, Martin Lowther (April 1978). "The Making of a Queen: The Education of Christina of Sweden". History Today. 28 (4).
- Essen-Möller, E. (1937). Drottning Christina. En människostudieur läkaresynpunkt. Lund: C.W.K. Gleerup.
- Granlund, Lis (2004). "Queen Hedwig Eleonora of Sweden: Dowager, Builder, and Collector". In Campbell Orr, Clarissa (ed.). Queenship in Europe 1660-1815: The Role of the Consort. Cambridge University Press. pp. 56–76. ISBN 978-0-521-81422-5.
- Grate, Pontus. "Vasa Family. Christina, Queen of Sweden". Grove Art Online. Oxford University Press.
- Hjortsjö, Carl-Herman (1966). The Opening of Queen Christina's Sarcophagus in Rome. Stockholm: Norstedts.
- Hjortsjö, Carl-Herman (1966). Queen Christina of Sweden: A medical/anthropological investigation of her remains in Rome (Acta Universitatis Lundensis). Lund: C.W.K. Gleerup.
- Jonsson, L.; Nilsson, Ann-Marie; Andersson, Greger (1994). Musiken i Sverige. Från forntiden till stormaktstidens slut 1720 [Music in Sweden. From Antiquity to the end of the Great power era 1720] (in Swedish).
- Löfgren, Lars (2003). Svensk teater [Swedish Theatre] (in Swedish).
- Masson, Georgina (1968). Queen Christina. London: Secker & Warburg.
- Mender, Mona (1997). Extraordinary women in support of music. Lanham, Maryland: Scarecrow Press. pp. 29–35. ISBN 978-0-8108-3278-7.
- Meyer, Carolyn (2003). Kristina, the Girl King: Sweden, 1638.
- Penny, Nicholas (2008). The Sixteenth Century Italian Paintings, Volume II, Venice 1540-1600. National Gallery Catalogues (new series). National Gallery Publications Ltd. ISBN 978-1-85709-913-3.
- Platen, Magnus von (1966). Christina of Sweden: Documents and Studies. Stockholm: National Museum.
- Stolpe, Sven (1996). Drottning Kristina. Stockholm: Aldus/Bonnier.
- Torrione, Margarita (2011), Alejandro, genio ardiente. El manuscrito de Cristina de Suecia sobre la vida y hechos de Alejandro Magno, Madrid, Editorial Antonio Machado (212 p., color ill.) ISBN 978-84-7774-257-9.
- Trevor-Roper, Hugh; Princes and Artists, Patronage and Ideology at Four Habsburg Courts 1517-1633, Thames & Hudson, London, 1976
- Turner, Nicholas, Federico Barocci, 2000, Vilo
- Watson, Peter; Wisdom and Strength, the Biography of a Renaissance Masterpiece, Hutchinson, 1990, ISBN 009174637X
- Daniela Williams, "Joseph Eckhel (1737-1798) and the coin collection of Queen Christina of Sweden in Rome ", Journal of the History of Collections 31 (2019).

Christina House of Vasa Born: 8 December 1626 Died: 19 April 1689
Regnal titles
Preceded by Gustav II Adolf	Queen of Sweden; 1632–1654	Succeeded by Charles X Gustav
New title	Duchess of Bremen and Verden; 1648–1654	Succeeded by Charles X Gustav
Preceded by Bogislaw XIV	Duchess of Pomerania; 1637–1654	Succeeded by Charles X Gustav
