= Reyer Anslo =

Dutch poet

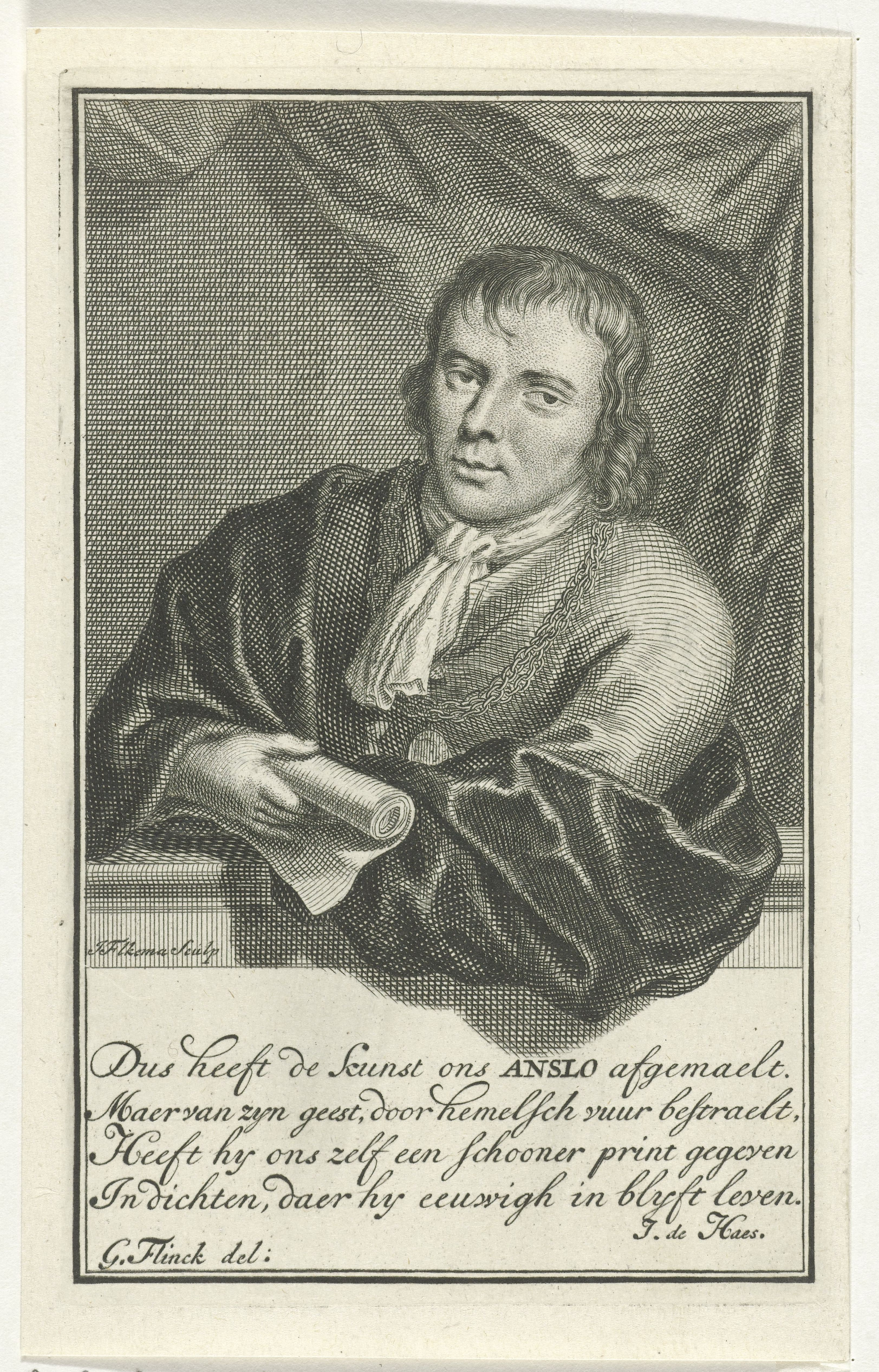
- Born: 1626; Amsterdam, County of Holland, Dutch Republic
- Died: 10 May 1669; Perugia, Italy
- Citizenship: Netherlands
- Occupation(s): poet, dramaturgy

Reyer Anslo (1622 or 1626 – 16 May 1669) was a Dutch poet.

== Life ==
Anslo was born at Amsterdam and brought up a Mennonite. His family originated from Christiania, now Oslo (Norway). His mother remarried in 1631. He was baptized in 1646. Early civic fame as a poet came to him in Amsterdam, when he was rewarded by his with a laurel crown and a silver dish for a poem in honour of the foundation stone of the new town hall in 1648. In 1649 he travelled to Rome with Arnout Hellemans Hooft (1629-1680), the son of P.C. Hooft; they arrived in November 1651.

In December 1651 he was received into the Catholic Church, together with forty-three others, as is shown by manuscript records of the Society of Jesus. He proceeded to Rome, where he became secretary to Cardinal Luigi Capponi, and received from Pope Innocent X a gold medal for his poetical labours. In 1655 he was presented to Queen Christina of Sweden, to whom he dedicated new poems. A poem entitled De Zweedsche Pallas ("The Swedish Pallas"), brought him a golden chain. He died at Perugia.

== Works ==
Anslo's collected works were published in 1713. They include a tragedy, "The Parisian Blood-Bridal" (De parysche bloed-bruiloff, 1649), dealing with the Massacre of St. Bartholomew. He wrote an epic on The Plague at Naples (1656).
