= Antoine de Beaulieu =

Antoine de Beaulieu (died 1663) was a French noble, dancer, and ballet master of the Swedish court from 1637 to 1663 and is considered to have introduced ballet in Sweden.

== Career ==
Antoine de Beaulieu was employed in Sweden after a recommendation to the Queen Dowager, Maria Eleonora of Brandenburg, by the French ambassador. Ballet was considered as a good exercise for boys of the nobility to move gracefully during riding and fencing. In 1638, Beaulieu performed a dramatic ballet with poems for Queen Christina by the order of Eleonora Catherine of Pfalz-Zweibrücken. The participants consisted of boys and men of the nobility, among them Magnus Gabriel de la Gardie and the future Charles X Gustav of Sweden. He made about 20 ballets until 1654. At the coronation of Christina in 1651, he performed in a coronation ballet.

== See also ==
- Anne Chabanceau de La Barre
- Antoine Bournonville
- Louis Gallodier
