= Laura Ruohonen =

Finnish playwright and theatre director (born 1960)

Laura Ruohonen (born October 9, 1960, in Helsinki, Finland) is a Finnish playwright and theatre director. She has worked also as Professor of Dramaturgy in Theatre Academy of Finland.

== Some works ==
- Olga (1995, Finnish National Theatre)
- The Greatest of These is Love (Suurin on rakkaus, 1998, Finnish National Theatre)
- The Swamp Man Never Sleeps (Suomies ei nuku, 2000, KOM-teatteri)
- An Island Far From Here (Saari kaukana täältä, 2003, Royal National Theatre)
- Razorbill (Yksinen, 2006, Teatteri Jurkka)
- War Tourists (Sotaturistit, 2008, Finnish National Theatre)
