= Francesco Albizzi =

His Eminence Francesco Albizzi
- Cardinal-Priest of Santa Prassede
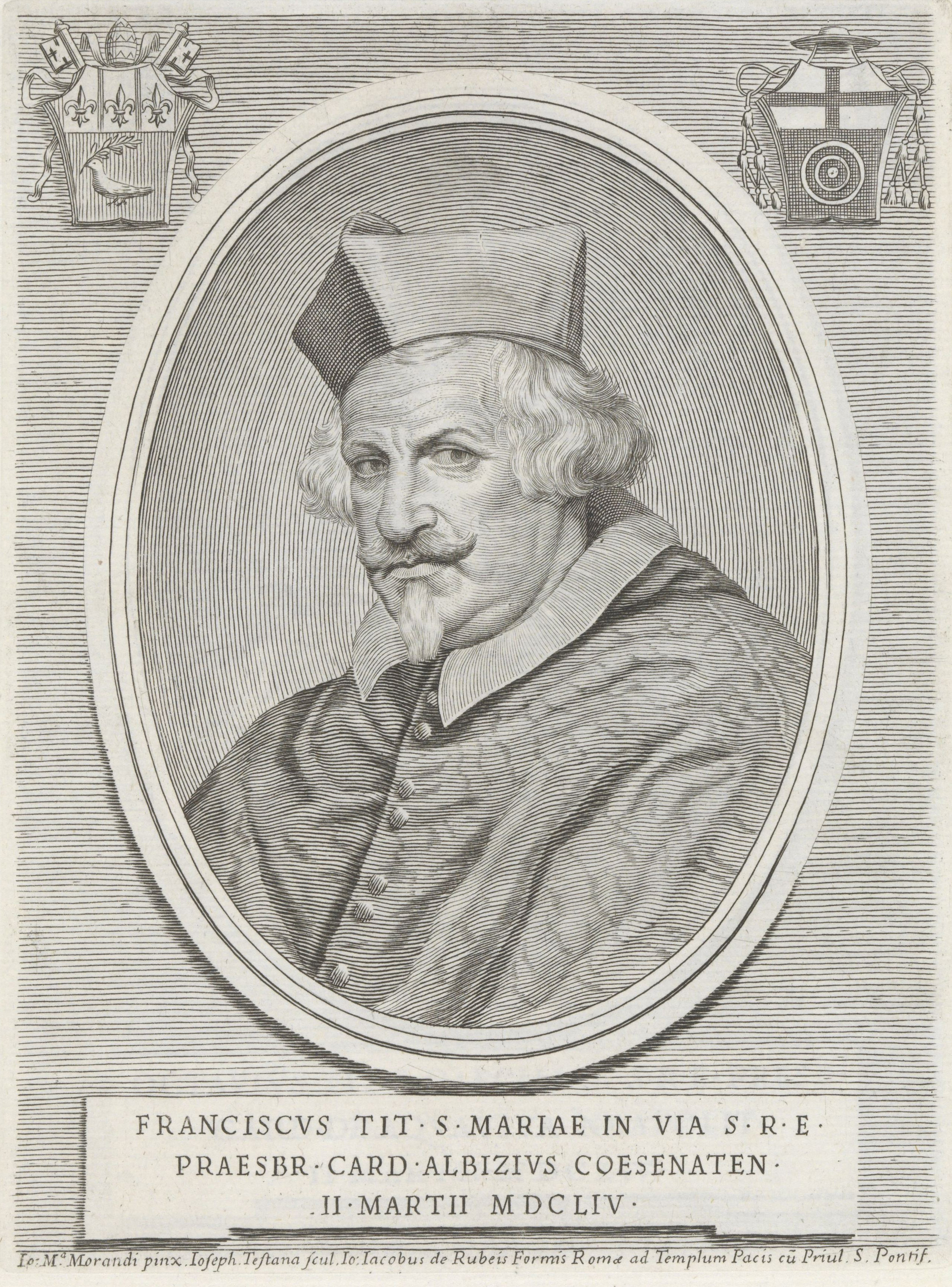
- Church: Roman Catholic
- Installed: 1 December 1681
- Term ended: 5 October 1684
- Predecessor: Pietro Vito Ottoboni
- Successor: Decio Azzolini
- Other posts: Cardinal-Priest of Santa Maria in Via (2 March 1654-24 January 1671); Camerlengo of the Sacred College of Cardinals (January 1667 - January 1669); Cardinal-Priest of Santi Quattro Coronati (24 January 1871-8 December 1680); Cardinal-Priest of Santa Maria in Trastevere (8 January 1680-1 December 1681)

Orders
- Ordination: 1624
- Created cardinal: 2 March 1654 by Pope Innocent X
- Rank: Cardinal-Priest

Personal details
- Born: 24 October 1593 Cesena
- Died: 5 October 1684 (aged 90) Rome
- Buried: Santa Maria in Traspontina
- Denomination: Roman Catholic
- Parents: Tommaso and Francesca Funetti Albizzi

Francesco Albizzi (24 October 1593 in Cesena – 5 October 1684, Rome) was an Italian cardinal. As a member of the Roman Inquisition, he worked to increase the standards of jurisprudence in Rome, and establish "rigorous standards of evidence and proof", particularly in regards to alleged cases of witchcraft.

== Biography ==
Cardinal Albizzi was born in Cesena on 24 October 1593 to Tommaso Albizzi and Francesca Funetti. He obtained a doctorate degree in utroque iure at the University of Bologna, and began to teach civil and canon law there in 1611. Three years later, he married Violante Martinelli, by whom he had five children with. After her death, he moved to Rome, where he became closely connected with the Jesuits; and, through their influence, became secretary to certain prelates, and afterwards to the pope himself.

Around 1627, he became the general auditor to Cesare Monti, Apostolic Nuncio to the Kingdom of Naples. The following year, when Monti was appointed to Spain, Albizzi accompanied him in the same capacity. Returning to Rome in 1635, he was named councilor of the Roman Inquisition, the final court of appeal in trials of heresy; and in 1636 referendary of the Apostolic Signatura. In 1636-37 he accompanied Cardinal Marzio Ginetti, Papal Legate to Austria. In 1653, he composed for Pope Innocent X the Cum occasione, a papal bull, condemning five propositions of Cornelius Jansen's Augustinus.

=== Cardinal ===
Pope Innocent X made him Cardinal-Priest of Santa Maria in Via on 2 March 1654; he was made a cardinal-inquisitor on 30 March. He wrote De inconstantia in jure admittenda vel non which described the increased standards of evidence and proof required by the Roman Inquisition in cases of alleged witchcraft. Printed in 1683, it was circulated widely in areas subject to its jurisdiction.

During his Cardinalate, he attended the Conclaves of conclave of 1655, 1667, 1669-70, and 1676 which elected Popes Alexander VII, Clement IX, Clement X and Innocent XI respectively. He was a member of the Squadrone Volante, a group of independent cardinals without allegiance to any particular national interest be it France or Spain. As such, they were able to exercise a good deal of influence in the election of a successor pope. They were therefore courted by both sides.

On 24 August 1671, he was made Cardinal-priest of Santi Quattro Coronati; on 8 January 1680, his title was changed to Cardinal-priest of Santa Maria in Trastevere. On 1 December 1861 he became Cardinal-priest Santa Prassede, which title he held until his death. He also became the Camerlengo of the Sacred College of Cardinals in January 1667.

Albizzi did not approve of the theories of Miguel de Molinos because, among other objections, it appeared to encourage the rejection of vocal prayer and the sacrament of confession, as had been seen in some convents of religious women. In 1682, he composed the Scripture on the prayer of quiet, in which he took a stand against quietism.

Cardinal Albizzi died in Rome on 5 October 1683, at the age of 90. At the time of his death, he was the Oldest living Member of the Sacred College.

Catholic Church titles
Preceded by Carlo Rossetti	Cardinal Priest of Santa Maria in Via; 2 March 1654-24 August 1671	Succeeded by César d'Estrées
Preceded by Giambattista Spada	Camerlengo of the Sacred College of Cardinals; January 1667 – 14 January 1669	Succeeded by Ottavio Acquaviva d'Aragona
Preceded by Cesare Facchinetti	Cardinal-Priest of Santi Quattro Coronati; 24 August 1671 – 8 January 1680	Succeeded by Sebastiano Antonio Tanara
Preceded by Pietro Vito Ottoboni	Cardinal-Priest of Santa Maria in Trastevere; 8 January 1680 – 1 December 1681	Succeeded by Carlo Pio di Savoia
Preceded by Pietro Vito Ottoboni	Cardinal-Priest of Prassede; 1 December 1681 – 5 October 1684	Succeeded by Decio Azzolino
Records
Preceded by Marzio Ginetti	Oldest living Member of the Sacred College; 1 MArch 1671 - 5 October 1684	Succeeded by Girolamo Grimaldi-Cavalleroni
