= Cesare Facchinetti =

Italian Catholic Cardinal

His Eminence Cesare Facchinetti
- Cardinal Bishop of Ostia e Velletri
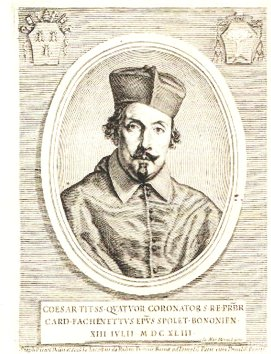
- Church: Catholic Church
- Predecessor: Francesco Barberini
- Successor: Niccolò Albergati-Ludovisi

Orders
- Consecration: 9 October 1639 by Diego Castejón Fonseca
- Created cardinal: 31 August 1643
- Rank: Cardinal-Bishop

Personal details
- Born: 17 September 1608 Bologna, Papal States
- Died: 30 January 1683 (age 74)
- Coat of arms

Cesare Facchinetti (17 September 1608 – 30 January 1683) was an Italian Catholic Cardinal.

== Early life ==
Facchinetti was born 17 September 1608 in Bologna. He was the son of Ludovico Facchinetti (2nd Marquis of Vianino), Senator of Bologna, Ambassador of Bologna to the Holy See) and Violante da Correggio (Countess of Coenzo). He was the great-grand-nephew of Gian Facchinetti, who took the papal throne in 1591 as Pope Innocent IX.

== Ecclesiastic career ==
He went to Rome in 1632 and became Referendary of the Tribunals of the Apostolic Signatura. Thereafter he was sent to Spain as an apostolic nuncio. Upon his return, he was elevated to Cardinal on 13 July 1643 by Pope Urban VIII and was installed as Cardinal-Priest at the Santi Quattro Coronati basilica.

Facchinetti was popular with the other cardinals of the college and there was discussion, according to contemporary John Bargrave, that he might be considered papabile - that is, appropriate for election as pope. This did not eventuate, though he remained popular with the Spanish faction within the college and the French faction had no considerable objection to him.

As a result of his popularity, his family members were appointed to various military and administrative positions. His brother, for example, was appointed as commander of the militia by Pope Innocent X during the second War of Castro.

In 1671, he was appointed Cardinal-Priest at San Lorenzo in Lucina, in 1672 at Cardinal-Bishop of Palestrina and in 1679 Cardinal-Bishop of Porto e S. Rufina. At the death of Francesco Barberini (10 December 1679), he became Dean of the College of Cardinals and in the consistory of 8 January 1680, Innocent XI appointed him Bishop of Ostia e Velletri, Secretary of the Roman Inquisition and administrator of the Apostolic Chancery, positions he held until his death.

Facchinetti participated in every papal conclave between 1644 and 1676 including 1644, 1655, 1667, 1669–1670 and 1676.

He died 30 January 1683 in Rome.

== Episcopal succession ==
Episcopal succession of Cesare Facchinett

While bishop, he was the principal consecrator of:

- Giacomo Accarisi, Bishop of Vieste (1644);
- Natale Caridei, Bishop of Šibenik (1654);
- Pier Maria Bichi, Bishop of Todi (1658);
- Maria Ranuzzi, Titular Archbishop of Tamiathis (1668);
- Leonardo Balsarini, Titular Bishop of Philadelphia in Arabia (1668);
- Stefano Agostini (cardinal), Titular Archbishop of Heraclea in Europa (1671);
- Costanzo Zani, Bishop of Imola (1672);
- Benedetto Bartolo, Bishop of Lacedonia (1672);
- Augusto Bellincini, Bishop of Reggio Emilia (1675);
- Francesco Antonio Boscaroli, Bishop of Caorle (1675);

and the principal co-consecrator of:

- Giovan Battista Foppa, Archbishop of Benevento (1643).

Catholic Church titles
Preceded by Bernardino Spada	Titular Archbishop of Tamiathis; 1639–1643	Succeeded by Neri Corsini
Preceded by Lorenzo Campeggi	Apostolic Nuncio to Spain; 1639–1643	Succeeded by Giovanni Giacomo Panciroli
Preceded by Lorenzo Campeggi	Archbishop (Personal Title) of Senigallia; 1643–1655	Succeeded by Francesco Cherubini
Preceded by Francesco Boncompagni	Cardinal-Priest of Santi Quattro Coronati; 1643–1671	Succeeded by Francesco Albizzi
Preceded by Lorenzo Castrucci	Archbishop (Personal Title) of Spoleto; 1655–1672	Succeeded by Ludovicus Sciamanna
Preceded by Rinaldo d'Este	Cardinal-Priest of San Lorenzo in Lucina; 1671–1672	Succeeded by Carlo Rossetti
Preceded by Rinaldo d'Este	Cardinal-Bishop of Palestrina; 1672–1679	Succeeded by Alderano Cybo
Preceded by Ulderico Carpegna	Bishop of Porto e Santa Rufina; 1679–1680	Succeeded by Carlo Rossetti
Preceded by Francesco Barberini	Bishop of Ostia; 1680–1683	Succeeded by Niccolò Albergati-Ludovisi
Preceded by Francesco Barberini	Dean of the College of Cardinals; 1679–1683	Succeeded by Niccolò Albergati-Ludovisi
