= Carlo Rossetti =

Italian Catholic Cardinal (1614–1681)

His Eminence Carlo Rossetti
- Bishop of Faenza
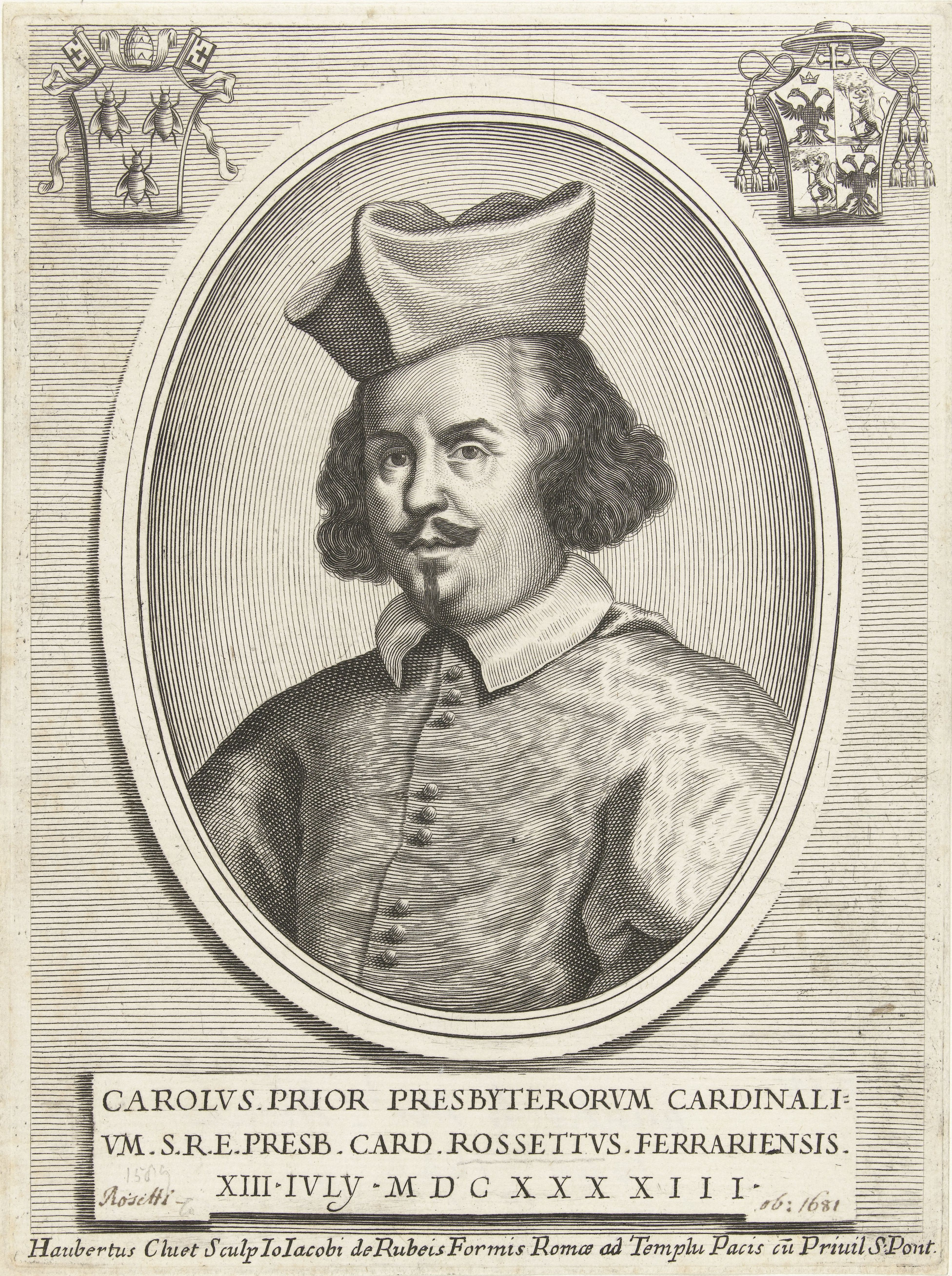
- Church: Catholic Church
- Appointed: 4 May 1643
- Term ended: 23 November 1681
- Predecessor: Francesco Cennini de' Salamandri
- Successor: Antonio Pignatelli
- Other posts: Cardinal-Bishop of Porto–Santa Rufina (1680-1681)
- Previous posts: Cardinal-Deacon of San Cesareo de Appia (1644–1653); Cardinal-Priest of San Silvestro in Capite (1654–1672); Cardinal-Priest of San Lorenzo in Lucina (1672–1676); Cardinal-Bishop of Frascati (1676-1680)

Orders
- Consecration: 8 December 1641 by Fabio Chigi
- Created cardinal: 13 July 1643 by Pope Urban VIII
- Rank: Cardinal-Bishop

Personal details
- Born: 1614 Ferrara, Italy
- Died: 13 July 1681 (aged 66–67) Faenza, Italy
- Buried: Faenza Cathedral

Carlo Rossetti (also Roscetti; 1614 – 23 November 1681) was an Italian Catholic Cardinal, born of the noble Rossetti family in Ferrara. Earlier in his career, he went to London as a secret nuncio on behalf of Pope Urban VIII. While in London, he was addressed as Lord Charles Rossetti and was referred to as Prince Rossetti, using his title as Italian nobility for his cover, rather than as a representative of the Roman Catholic Church to avoid persecution.

== Early life ==
Born of the noble Roscetti family in Ferrara, (to see: "La giusta Statera de porporati, dove s'intende la vita la nascita, adherenza di ciascun cardinale hoggi vivente etc, 1650". He was baptised in the Cathedral of S. Giorgio Martire on 26 March 1614. He was named Canon of the Cathedral of Ferrara, and was granted a papal dispensation because he was below the minimum age. Rossetti went to Rome as a young man. At the age of eighteen, he engaged in a public disputation (i.e. took his Baccalaureate) in philosophy and theology, in the presence of Cardinal Francesco Barberini, the nephew of Pope Urban VIII. He then studied law at the University of Bologna, and took his degree in utroque iure (both Canon Law and Civil Law). Cardinal Barberini sang his praises to Pope Urban VIII, who appointed him a prelate and referendary of the Two Signatures (Grace and Justice); this gave Rossetti the right to practice law before the Roman courts. He served Pope Urban VIII and his Barberini family, especially his nephews Francesco Barberini and Antonio Barberini.

== Nuncio in London ==
The Barberini were impressed by his vigour, wit and discernment and sent him as nuncio first to Germany, then to England as successor to the papal agent, George Con, who was gravely ill. There he provided financial support to Irish Catholics fighting against the Parliament of England. He arrived in August 1639. His mission was undertaken under a transparent disguise, as one Italian historian recalled:

There arrived, at London to reside at the court as a gentleman traveller, sent by Cardinal Barberini, but effectively he was the Pope's nuncio, by name Charles Rossetti, an earl by birth who had taken upon him the church habit of a prelate; who was of a great spirit, active and prudent, able to undertake business of the greatest difficulty. He was valorous of heart, had a learned tongue, was quick in parts; in brief, he was such and one that his fellow could not be found in all the Court of Rome.

Rossetti's mission was considered especially dangerous, given the conflict between the Church and England at the time. Even contemporary Italian authors dared not publish his real identity for fear the prelate's life might be threatened. But Rossetti's clandestine mission was successful in many regards. He managed to convince some at the English court to banish Roman Catholic priests from England, rather than execute them. When contemporary detractors suggested King Charles I of England and his Archbishop William Laud were papists, Rossetti bravely took the opportunity to suggest the King might consider converting to Catholicism, seeing as though he was being accused of as much anyway.

Charles' Queen, Henrietta Maria, saw Rossetti's position at court as potentially advantageous and, having developed a social relationship with the clandestine nobleman, urged the prelate to write to the uncle of his Barberini patrons, Pope Urban VIII, asking for the equivalent of £100,000 pounds sterling to aid England's ailing coffers. The Pope responded, saying he was, "...very ready to supply the King so soon as ever he should declare himself a Catholic".

When the bill of attainder was passed, and Archbishop William Laud was sentenced to death, some suggested Laud would have been better off had he converted to Catholicism and escaped to Rome (as Rossetti had urged) rather than staying to fight for which he was executed.

== Return to Rome ==
At the outbreak of the First Bishops' War, Rossetti's life was threatened. At the behest of the Queen, Henrietta Maria gave him refuge in St. James's Palace. Thereafter he was summoned to appear before the House of Commons of England but instead fled England at the end of June 1641. He went to Flanders with the assistance of the Venetian ambassador. His presence at Ghent on 7 September 1641 is established by a letter written by him to one of the Cardinals Barberini, containing a report on the intended colonization of Maryland. He then returned to Rome and to the service of the Barberini.

After he returned to Rome, he was appointed Archbishop of Tarsus on 16 September 1641. Since this was a titular See, his appointment was a direct action by the Pope, who intended to send him on a diplomatic mission, for which he needed episcopal status. He was consecrated bishop on 8 December 1641 in Cologne, by Bishop Fabio Chigi, the Apostolic Nuncio to Cologne. Rossetti had been dispatched, with the title of Nuncio Extraordinary, to the Congress of Münster, where an effort to find a solution to the Thirty Years' War was being attempted. After the Congress, he stayed on as Nuncio in Cologne for two years. On 4 May 1643 he was translated to the See of Faenza in succession to Cardinal Francesco Cennini, who resigned the office. Though he was promoted Bishop of Tusculum (Frascati) in 1676, he retained the Administration of Faenza until his death in 1681. During his time in charge of Faenza, he conducted no less than nine diocesan synods.

== Cardinal Rossetti ==
In the Consistory of 13 July 1643, Archbishop Carlo Rossetti was elevated to the cardinalate by Pope Urban VIII. In September 1643, Rossetti was named Legatus a latere and sent as ambassador to Cologne, but he was recalled the next year, due to the grave illness of the Pope. He left Germany on 11 May 1644, but did not reach Rome in time to be at the Pope's deathbed. Pope Urban died on 29 July 1644, and Rossetti participated in the Papal conclave of 1644, which opened on August 9. He was, of course, a loyal supporter of the Barberini faction. Despite his understandable support for the French nominee, Giulio Cesare Sacchetti, Rossetti suffered no ill effects when Giovanni Battista Pamphili took office as Pope Innocent X. On 28 November 1644 he was installed as Cardinal Deacon of the Deaconry of San Cesareo in Palatio.

On 18 August 1653 Rossetti was translated (moved) to the titulus of Santa Maria in Via Lata, and then on 9 March 1654 to San Silvestro in Capite. There he remained for 18 years until his appointment, on 14 November 1672, as Cardinal Priest of San Lorenzo in Lucina. From 12 January 1654 to 10 January 1656, he served a term as Camerlengo of the Sacred College of Cardinals.

However, during the papal conclave of 1655, Cardinal Rossetti worked against the candidacy of Cardinal Fabio Chigi. When Cardinal Chigi was elected to the papal throne as Pope Alexander VII, Rossetti returned to his diocese of Faenza and did not visit Rome for any significant length of time until the papal conclave of 1667. He participated in the Conclave of 1667, where his vote was actively sought by the ambassador of the Grand Duke of Tuscany on behalf of Cardinal d'Elci. Elci's candidacy failed, however, in the face of determined opposition, and Cardinal Giulio Rospigliosi was elected as Pope Clement XI with the support of the Barberini faction.

Cardinal Rossetti later participated in the papal conclaves of 1669–1670 and 1676.

He was appointed Cardinal-Bishop of Frascati (Tusculum) on 19 October 1676 and finally, Cardinal-Bishop of Porto-Santa Rufina on 8 January 1680. He died in Faenza on 23 November 1681, at the age of sixty-seven, and was buried in the Cathedral.

== Bibliography ==
- La giusta Statera de porporati, dove s'intende la vita la nascita, aderenza di ciascun cardinale oggi vivente etc., 1650.
- Domenico Fantozzi-Parma, Diario del viaggio fatto in Inghilterra nel 1639 dal Nunzio pontificio Rossetti (ed. G. Ferraro) (Bologna: Gaetano Romagnoli 1885).
- Giuseppe Ferraro, "Viaggio del Cardinale Rossetti fatto nel 1644 da Colonia a Ferrara, scritto dal suo segretario Armanni Vincenzo," Atti e memorie della R. Deputazione di storia patria per le provincie di Romagna 3 series 6 (Bologna 1888), pp. 1–90.
- Gregorio Leti, Il cardinalismo di Santa Chiesa,: divisa in tre parti. Parte II (Nella stamperia del Daniel Elsevier, 1668), pp. 184–186. [An apostate, propagandist, enemy of Urban VIII]
- Lorenzo Cardella, Memorie storiche de' cardinali della Santa Romana Chiesa VII (Roma: Pagliarini 1793), pp. 32–35.
- Ph. Dengel, "Kardinal Karl Rossetti auf seiner Wanderung durch Tirol im Jahre 1644," Forschungen und Mitteilungen zur Geschichte Tirols und Vorarlbergs I (1904), pp. 264–281.
- J. P. Kenyon, The Stuart Constitution, 1603-1688: Documents and Commentary (2nd edition) (Cambridge: Cambridge University Press 1986).
- Gianna Vancini, Carlo Rossetti: cardinale ferrarese nunzio apostolico e legato a latere nell'Europa del Seicento (1615-1681) (Portomaggiore: Edizioni Arstudio C, 2005).
- Katie Whitaker, A Royal Passion: The Turbulent Marriage of King Charles I of England and Henrietta Maria of France (New York: W. W. Norton & Company, 2010).

== See also ==
- George Conn (priest), another agent sent to England by Cardinal Antonio Barberini
- Gregorio Panzani, another agent sent to England by Cardinal Antonio Barberini

Catholic Church titles
| Preceded by Giangiacomo Teodoro Trivulzio | Cardinal-Deacon of San Cesareo in Palatio; 1644–1653 | Succeeded by Friedrich von Hessen-Darmstadt |
| Preceded by Francesco Angelo Rapaccioli | Cardinal Priest of Santa Maria in Via; 1653-1654 | Succeeded by Francesco Albizzi |
| Preceded by Domingo Pimentel Zúñiga | Cardinal Priest of San Silvestro in Capite; 1654–1672 | Succeeded by Gasparo Carpegna |
| Preceded by Virginio Orsini | Cardinal-Bishop of Frascati; 1676–1680 | Succeeded by Alderano Cybo |
| Preceded by Cesare Facchinetti | Cardinal-Bishop of Porto-Santa Rufina; 1680–1681 | Succeeded by Niccolò Albergati-Ludovisi |
