= Alderano Cybo =

Italian cardinal

His Eminence Alderano Cybo
- Dean of the College of Cardinals
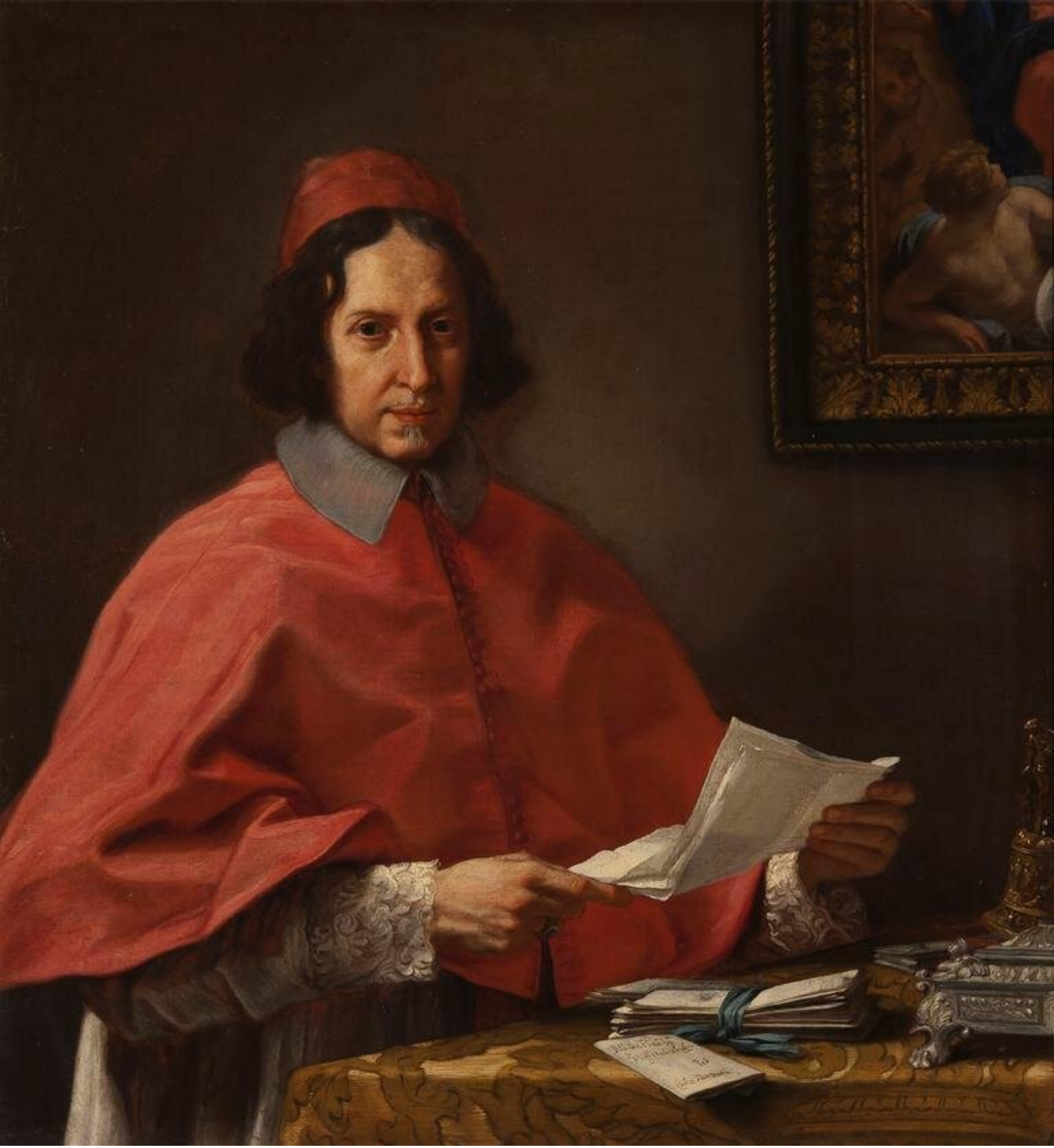
- Portrait by Carlo Maratta
- Church: Catholic Church
- In office: 1687–1700
- Other post: Cardinal-Bishop of Ostia e Velletri (1687–1700)

Orders
- Created cardinal: 6 March 1645 by Pope Innocent X
- Rank: Cardinal-Bishop

Personal details
- Born: 16 July 1613 Genoa, Republic of Genoa
- Died: 22 July 1700 (aged 87) Rome, Papal States
- Buried: Santa Maria del Popolo
- Parents: Carlo Cybo Malespina; Brigida Spinola
- Occupation: administrator Papal Secretary of State
- Profession: priest, bishop
- Coat of arms

Alderano Cybo (sometimes Alderano Cibo or Alderano Cybo-Malaspina; 16 July 1613 – 22 July 1700) was an Italian Catholic Cardinal. He served as the Secretary of State of Pope Innocent XI.

== Early life ==
Cybo was born 16 July 1613 in Genoa, the fifth of fourteen children of Carlo I Cybo-Malaspina, sovereign Prince of Massa and Carrara, and of Brigida Spinola (1587–1660), the daughter of the Marchese di Calice, Giannettino Spinola.

As was the custom in his family (he was descended from Pope Innocent VIII and, through his grandmother Marfisa d'Este, from Pope Alexander VI, and was probably Cardinal Innocenzo Cybo's adulterous great-great-grandson), Alderano and several of his siblings were destined for ecclesiastical careers. His elder sister Veronica, on the other hand, was married to the Florentine nobleman Jacopo Salviati, but was involved in an obscure episode in 1633, when she was alleged to be behind the savage murder of Caterina Brogi, Jacopo's mistress, whose head was delivered to him in a basket. Veronica was repudiated by her family, but their pressures on Medici government managed to prevent her being prosecuted for the murder. She was forced to leave Florence and to retire to the countryside, near Figline, in the Salviati's Villa San Cerbone. Later, she moved to Rome, where she took up residence in the Palazzo Salviati. Soon, however, the couple were reconciled and resumed living together, as shown by a 1641 letter from Cardinal Cybo.

== Ecclesiastical career ==
To pursue his ecclesiastical career, Cybo went to Rome in 1641, as Domestic Prelate and as a referendary of the Tribunal of the Two Signatures to Pope Urban VIII.

In 1644, he was appointed master of the Papal Chamber and prefect of the Holy Apostolic Palace.

On 6 March 1645, Cybo was elevated to the rank of cardinal by Pope Innocent X, and named Cardinal-Priest of Santa Pudenziana. In 1646, he was given the office of papal legate (i.e. governor) in Urbino, and in 1648 of papal legate in the Romandiola. In 1651, he became legate in Ferrara.

On 24 April 1656, he was appointed Bishop of Jesi.

The Cardinal held a diocesan synod in Jesi from 4 to 6 July 1658. He resigned the diocese on 10 December 1671, in favor of his brother Lorenzo Cybo.

In 1677, Cardinal Cybo was appointed papal legate (governor) in Avignon, which was an exclave of the Papal States in France. He held the office until 1690, though he administered his office only through appointees, never visiting personally.

On 6 February 1679, Cybo was appointed suburbicarian Bishop of Palestrina by Pope Innocent XI. He was transferred to the diocese of Tusculum (Frascati) on 8 January 1680. He was promoted to the diocese of Porto e Santa Rufina on 8 January 1680. He became Dean of the College of Cardinals and Bishop of Ostia e Velletri on 10 November 1687.

Cybo participated in the papal conclaves of 1655, 1667, 1669–1670 and 1676. As Dean, he presided over the Papal conclave of 1689 and the conclave of 1691.

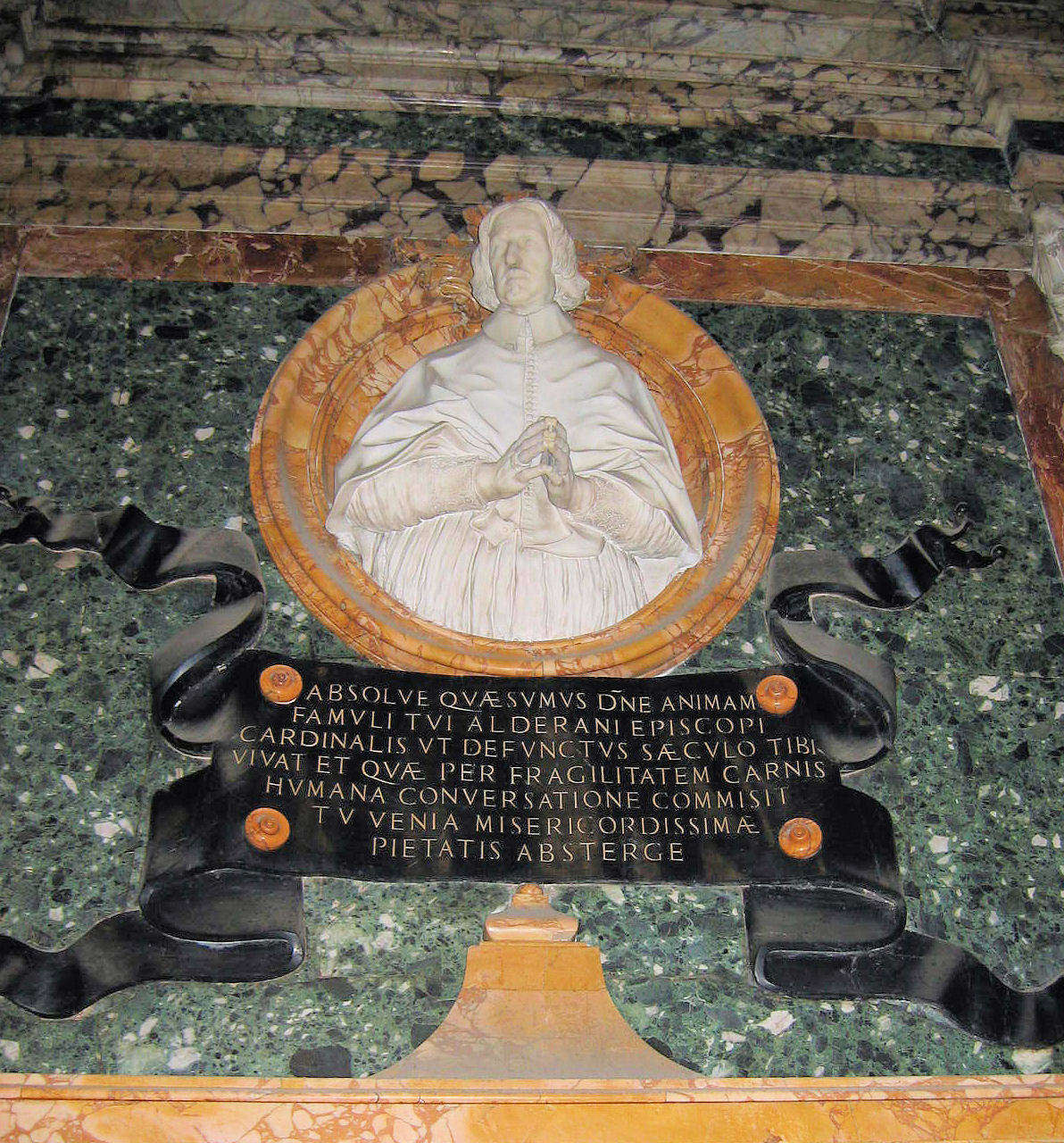
Sculpture of Alderano Cybo at the Santa Maria del Popolo.

== Later life and death ==
In 1676, Cybo was appointed Cardinal Secretary of State by Pope Innocent XI; he held the post until the death of Pope Innocent in 1689.

In 1698, Cardinal Cybo held a diocesan synod at Velletri on 24 and 25 November. The constitutions of the synod were published.

Cybo died on 22 July 1700 in Rome, and was buried in the Cybo Chapel of the church of Santa Maria del Popolo, which he had radically rebuilt by Carlo Fontana and Carlo Maratta to glorify the achievements of his family.

== Bibliography ==
- Cardella, Lorenzo (1793). Memorie storiche de cardinali della Santa romana chiesa (in Italian). Vol. Tomo settimo. Roma: Pagliarini. pp. 64–67.
- Gauchat, Patritius (Patrice) (1935). Hierarchia catholica. Vol. Tomus IV (1592-1667). Münster: Libraria Regensbergiana.
- Mussi, L. (1913). Il cardinal Alderano dei principi Cybo Malaspina. Massa 1913. (in Italian)
- Paviolo, Maria Gemma (2018). I Testamenti dei Cardinali: Alderano Cybo (1613-1700) (in Italian). Lulu.com. p. 17-38. ISBN 978-0-244-37546-1.
- Ritzler, Remigius; Sefrin, Pirminus (1952). Hierarchia catholica medii et recentis aevi. Vol. Tomus V (1667-1730). Patavii: Messagero di S. Antonio.

Catholic Church titles
Preceded by Cesare Facchinetti	Secretary of the Congregation for the Doctrine of the Faith; 1683–1700	Succeeded by Galeazzo Marescotti
Preceded by Niccolò Albergati-Ludovisi	Cardinal Bishop of Porto-Santa Rufina; 1683–1687	Succeeded by Pietro Vito Ottoboni
Preceded by Carlo Rossetti	Cardinal-Bishop of Frascati; 1680–1683	Succeeded by Pietro Vito Ottoboni
Preceded by Ulderico Carpegna	Cardinal-Bishop of San Pietro in Vincoli; 1661–1676	Succeeded by Emmanuel Théodose de la Tour d'Auvergne
Preceded by Niccolò Albergati-Ludovisi	Cardinal Bishop of Velletri-Segni; 1687–1700	Succeeded by Emmanuel Théodose de la Tour d'Auvergne
Preceded by Cesare Facchinetti	Cardinal-Bishop of Palestrina; 1679–1680	Succeeded by Lorenzo Raggi
Preceded by Niccolò Albergati-Ludovisi	Dean of the College of Cardinals; 1679–1700	Succeeded by Emmanuel Theodose de la Tour d'Auvergne
Records
Preceded by Giacomo Franzoni	Oldest living Member of the Sacred College; 19 December 1697 - 22 July 1700	Succeeded by Henri Albert de la Grange d'Arquien
