= Niccolò Albergati-Ludovisi =

Italian Catholic Cardinal and Archbishop of Bologna

- Cardinal-Bishop of Ostia (e Velletri)
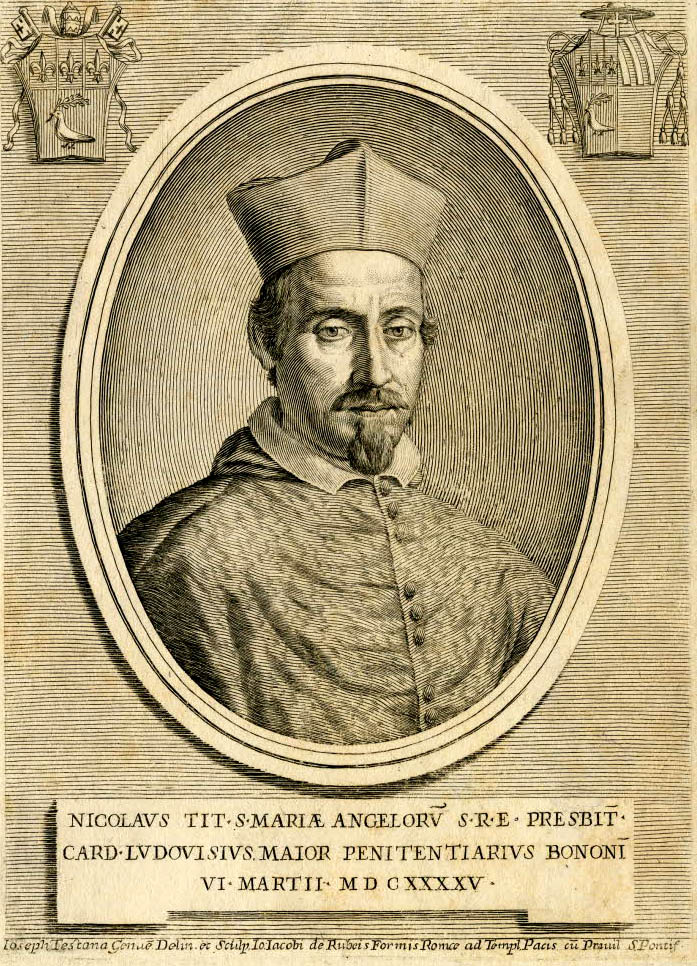
- Church: Catholic Church
- Diocese: Suburbicarian Diocese of Ostia (e Velletri)
- In office: 15 February 1683 – 9 August 1687
- Predecessor: Cesare Facchinetti
- Successor: Alderano Cybo
- Other post: Major Penitentiary of the Apostolic Penitentiary (1650-1687)
- Previous posts: Cardinal-Bishop of Porto e Santa Rufina (1681-1683); Cardinal-Bishop of Sabina (1677-1681); Cardinal-Priest of San Lorenzo in Lucina (1676-1677); Cardinal-Priest of Santa Maria in Trastevere (1666-1676); Cardinal-Priest of Santa Maria degli Angeli (1646-1666); Archbishop of Bologna (1645-1651); Cardinal-Priest of Sant'Agostino (1645-1646)

Orders
- Consecration: 26 February 1645 by Girolamo Colonna
- Created cardinal: 6 March 1645 by Pope Innocent X

Personal details
- Born: 15 September 1608 Bologna, Romagna, Papal States
- Died: 9 August 1687 (aged 78) Rome, Papal States

Niccolò Albergati-Ludovisi (15 September 1608 – 9 August 1687) was an Italian Catholic Cardinal and Archbishop of Bologna.

== Biography ==
He was a cousin of Cardinal Ludovico Ludovisi. On 16 September 1640, he was consecrated bishop by Giovanni Battista Pamphilj, Cardinal-Priest of Sant'Eusebio with Giovanni Battista Rinuccini, Archbishop of Fermo, and Lelio Falconieri, Titular Archbishop of Thebae, serving as co-consecrators.

On 6 February 1645, he was appointed Archbishop of Bologna, and on 6 March 1645, he was elevated to cardinal by Pope Innocent X. He served as Cardinal-Priest of the Basilica di Sant'Agostino and then the Santa Maria degli Angeli e dei Martiri.

In 1650, he was appointed Major Penitentiary, and in 1683, he was appointed Dean of the College of Cardinals. He held both position until his death. Between 1658 and 1659, he served as Camerlengo of the Sacred College of Cardinals.

== Episcopal succession ==
Episcopal succession of Niccolò Albergati-Ludovisi

While bishop, he was the principal consecrator of:

- Marco Romano (bishop) (Cristalli), Bishop of Ruvo (1646);
- Giacomo Giordano, Bishop of Lacedonia (1651);
- Petronio Veroni, Bishop of Boiano (1652);
- Girolamo Boncompagni, Archbishop of Bologna (1652);
- Antonio Bichi, Bishop of Montalcino (1652);
- Lorenzo Pollicini, Bishop of Avellino e Frigento (1653);
- Bonaventura Teoli, Titular Archbishop of Myra (1655); and
- Ulysses Rossi, Titular Archbishop of Salamis and Auxiliary Bishop of Sabina (1681).

== References and notes ==
Catholic Church titles
Preceded by Girolamo Colonna	Archbishop of Bologna; 1645–1651	Succeeded by Girolamo Boncompagni
Preceded by Carlo Rossetti	Cardinal Bishop of Porto-Santa Rufina; 1681–1683	Succeeded by Alderano Cybo
Preceded by Cesare Facchinetti	Cardinal Bishop of Velletri-Segni; 1683–1687	Succeeded by Alderano Cybo
Preceded by Cesare Facchinetti	Dean of the College of Cardinals; 1683–1687	Succeeded by Alderano Cybo
