= Girolamo Boncompagni =

Italian cardinal

His Eminence Girolamo Boncompagni
- Cardinal, Archbishop of Bologna
- Church: Roman Catholic
- Archdiocese: Bologna
- Appointed: 11 December 1651
- Term ended: 24 January 1684
- Other post: Cardinal-Priest of Santi Marcellino e Pietro (1664–84)

Orders
- Consecration: 4 February 1652 by Niccolò Albergati-Ludovisi
- Created cardinal: 14 January 1664 by Pope Alexander VII
- Rank: Cardinal-Priest

Personal details
- Born: 23 March 1622 Isola del Liri, Papal States
- Died: 24 January 1684 (aged 61) Bologna, Papal States

Don Girolamo Boncompagni (23 March 1622 – 24 January 1684) was a Roman Catholic cardinal.

== Biography ==
He was born in Isola del Liri, the son of Don Gregorio I Boncompagni, 2nd Duke of Sora, Aquino, Arce and Arpino, 3rd Marquess of Vignola, and his wife, Eleonora Zapata, called Zappi and the great-grandson of Pope Gregory XIII. There were several other Cardinals in his family; he was the Grand-nephew of Cardinal Filippo Boncompagni (1572), nephew of Cardinal Francesco Boncompagni (1621) and uncle of another Cardinal Girolamo Boncompagni, archbishop of Bologna (1695).

On 4 February 1652, he was consecrated bishop by Niccolò Albergati-Ludovisi, Cardinal-Priest of Santa Maria degli Angeli e dei Martiri, with Ranuccio Scotti Douglas, Bishop Emeritus of Borgo San Donnino, and Carlo Carafa della Spina, Bishop of Aversa, serving as co-consecrators.

He died in Bologna.

== Episcopal succession ==
While bishop, he was the principal consecrator of:

- Giulio Spinola, Titular Archbishop of Laodicea in Phrygia (1658);
- Niccolo Pietro Bargellini, Titular Archbishop of Thebae (1665);
- Girolamo Gastaldi, Archbishop of Benevento (1680);

and the principal co-consecrator of:

- Ascanio Ugolini, Bishop of Muro Lucano (1652).

Catholic Church titles
Preceded by Niccolò Albergati-Ludovisi	Archbishop of Bologna; 1651–1684	Succeeded by Angelo Maria Ranuzzi
Preceded by Giovanni Battista Deti	Cardinal-Priest of Santi Marcellino e Pietro; 1664–1684	Succeeded by Giacomo Cantelmo
