= Santi Quattro Coronati =

- Basilica of the Four Holy Crowned Ones
- Basilica dei Santi Quattro Coronati
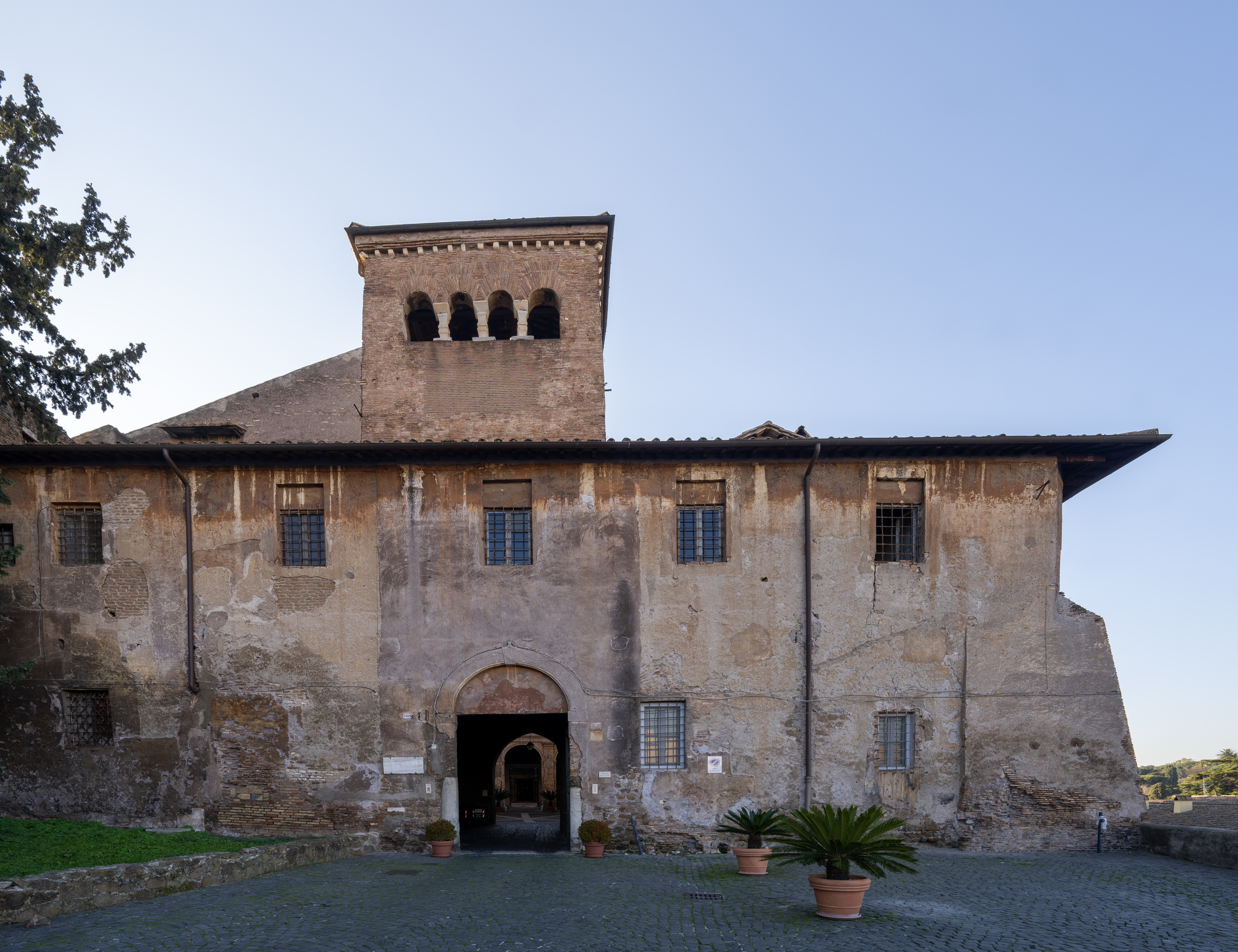
- Click on the map for a fullscreen view
- 41°53′18″N 12°29′54″E
- Location: Via dei SS. Quattro 20, Rome
- Country: Italy
- Language: Italian
- Denomination: Catholic
- Tradition: Latin Church
- Religious order: Order of Hermits of Saint Augustine (nuns)
- Website: Monastero Agostiniano

History
- Status: titular church, minor basilica
- Founded: 4th century
- Dedication: Four Crowned Martyrs: St. Secundus; St. Severianus; St. Carpoforus; St. Victorinus

Architecture
- Architectural type: Carolingian
- Completed: 1116

Administration
- Diocese: Rome

Santi Quattro Coronati is an ancient titular and conventual minor basilica and Augustinian convent in Rome, Italy. The church dates back to the fourth or fifth century, and is devoted to four anonymous saints and martyrs. The complex of the basilica with its two courtyards, the fortified Cardinal Palace with the Saint Silvester Chapel, and the monastery with its cosmatesque cloister is built in a silent and green part of Rome, between the Colosseum and San Giovanni in Laterano.

== The Santi Quattro Coronati ==
"Santi Quattro Coronati" means the Four Holy Crowned Ones [i.e. martyrs], and refers to the fact that the saints' names are not known, and therefore referred to with their number, and that they were martyrs, since the crown, together with the branches of palm, is an ancient symbol of martyrdom. According to the Passion of St. Sebastian, the four saints were soldiers who refused to sacrifice to Aesculapius, and therefore were killed by order of Emperor Diocletian (r. 284–305). The bodies of the martyrs were buried in the cemetery of Santi Marcellino e Pietro, on the fourth mile of via Labicana, by Pope Miltiades and St Sebastian (whose skull is preserved in the church). Miltiades decided that the martyrs should be venerated with the names of Claudius, Nicostratus, Simpronianus and Castorius; these names — together with a fifth, Simplicius — were those of five Pannonian martyr stonemasons.

These martyrs were later identified with the four martyrs from Albano; Secundus (or Severus); Severianus; Carpoforus (Carpophorus); and Victorinus (Vittorinus). The bodies of the martyrs are kept in four ancient sarcophagi in the crypt. According to a stone dated 1123, the head of one of the four martyrs is buried in Santa Maria in Cosmedin.

== History ==
Tradition holds the first church on the site was begun by Pope Miltiades, in the 4th century on the north side of the Coelian Hill. One of the first churches of Rome, it bore the Titulus Aemilianae from the name of the foundress, who probably owned the elaborate Roman villa, the structure of which is evident under the church. The church was completed by the end of the 6th century, and because of its proximity to the medieval papal residence of the Lateran Palace, it became prominent in its day. The first renovations occurred under Pope Leo IV (847–855), who built the crypt under the nave, added to side aisles, enclosed the courtyard before the facade, and built the belltower and the chapels of Saints Barbara and Nicholas. The new remarkable basilica, Carolingian architecture in style, was 95 m long and 50 m wide.

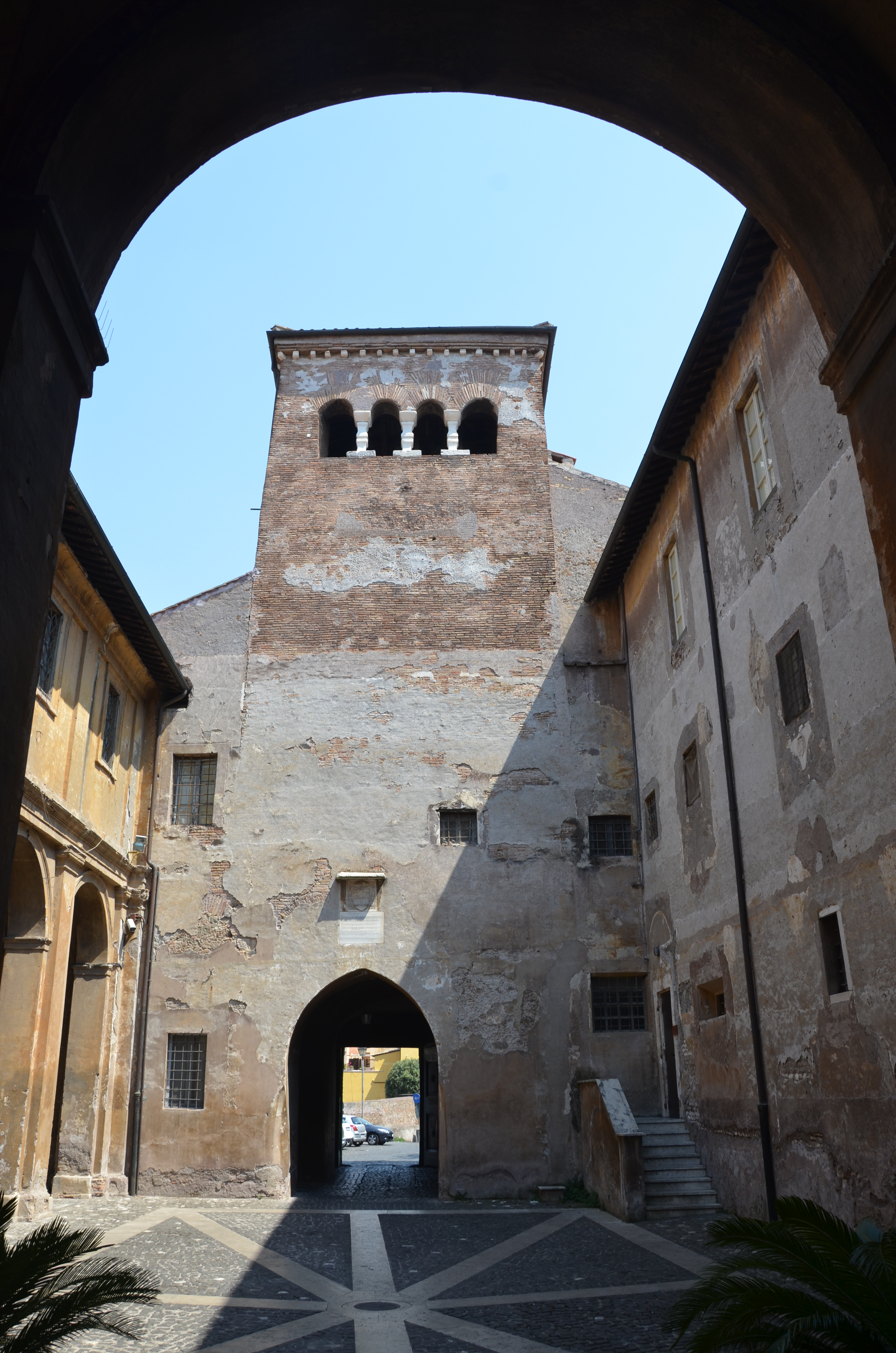
First courtyard

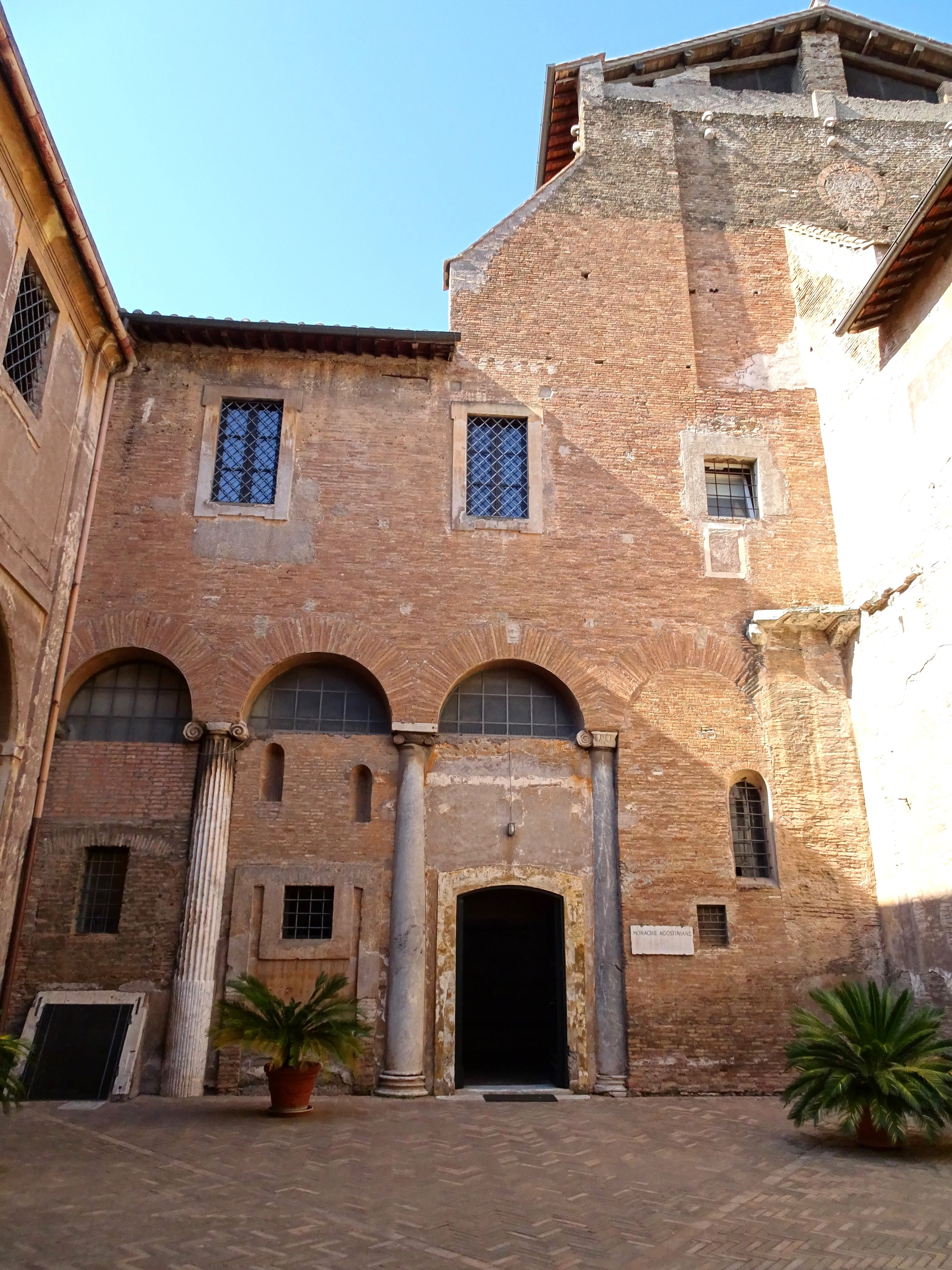
Second courtyard with original nave columns

This church, however, was burned to the ground by Robert Guiscard's troops during the Norman Sack of Rome (1084). Instead of rebuilding the original basilica to scale, Pope Paschal II built a smaller basilica with two courtyards, one in front of the other; the first corresponding to the original 9th century courtyard, while the second was sited over the initial part of the nave. The two aisles were included in the Cardinal Palace (right) and in the Benedictine monastery founded by Paschal himself (left). The original apse of the basilica, however, was preserved, and seems oversized for the new church, whose nave was divided into three parts by means of columns. The new church was consecrated on 20 January 1116. In 1338, it was a possession of the Sassovivo Abbey.

In the 13th century a Cosmatesque cloister was added. The Cardinal Palace was enlarged by cardinal Stefano Conti, a nephew of Pope Innocent III. Cardinal Conti also transformed the palace into a fortress, to shelter Popes in the Lateran during the conflict with the Hohenstaufen emperors. In 1247, the chapel of St Sylvester, on the ground floor of the fortress, was consecrated; it contains frescoes depicting the stories of Pope Silvester I and Emperor Constantine I, among which the un-historical baptism of the emperor, as well as a depiction of the forged Donation of Constantine. Painted in the backdrop of political struggles between Pope Innocent IV and the freshly excommunicated holy Roman emperor Frederick II, the frescoes are meant to underscore the desired sovereignty of the Church (Pope Silvester) over the Empire (Constantine).

When the Popes moved to Avignon (14th century), the Cardinal Palace fell into ruin. Thus, upon the return of the Popes to Rome with Pope Martin V, a restoration was necessary. However, when the Papal residence moved from the Lateran to the Vatican palace, this basilica lost importance. In 1564, Pope Pius IV entrusted the basilica and the surrounding buildings to the Augustinians, who still serve it.

The interest in the history of this complex renewed in 1913, thanks to the work of the Fine Arts Superintendent Antonio Muñoz. Once the building became an orphanage, the Augustinian nuns put a revolving drum by its entrance which was used as a deposit "box" for unwanted babies.

== Interior decoration ==
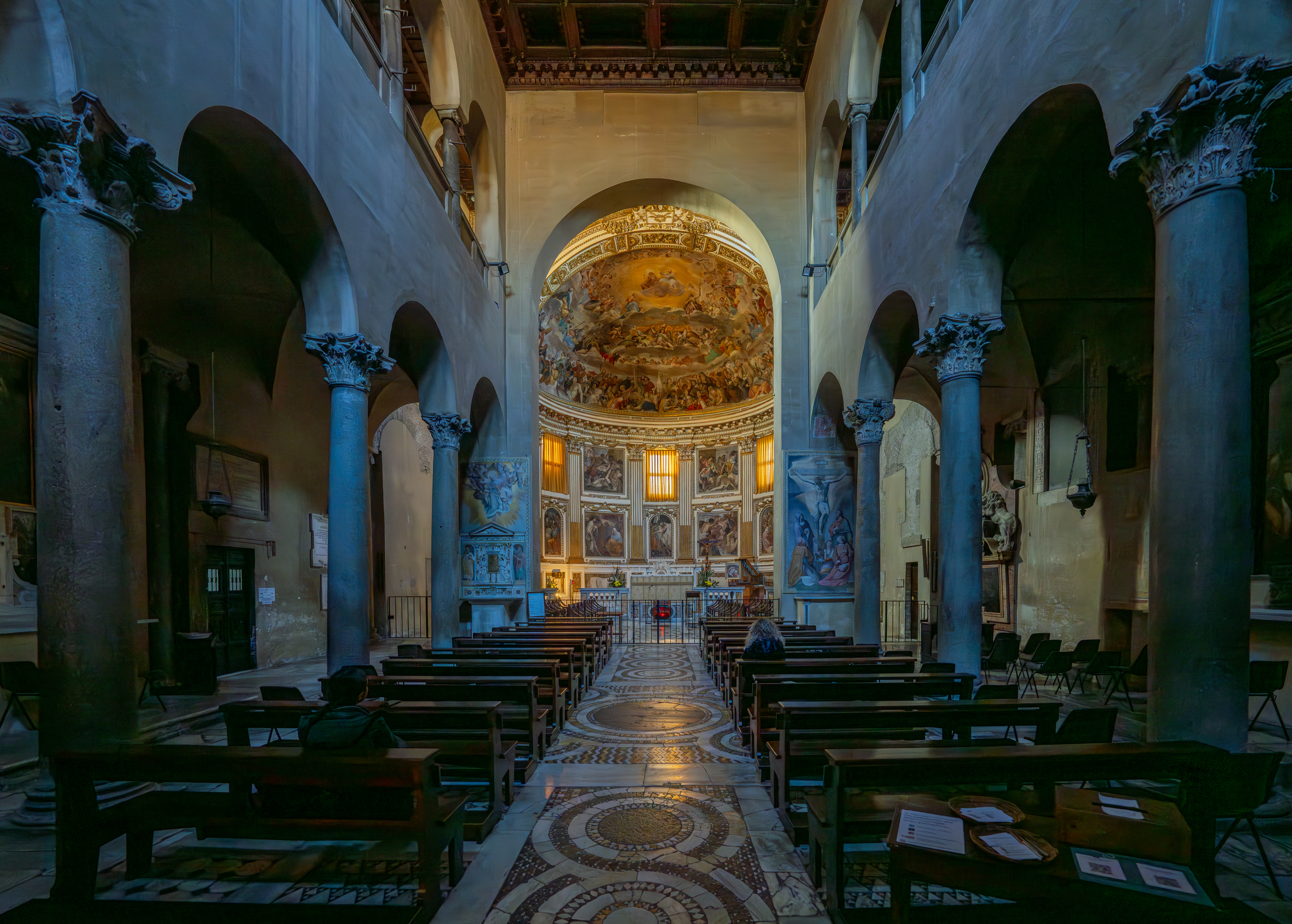
Nave

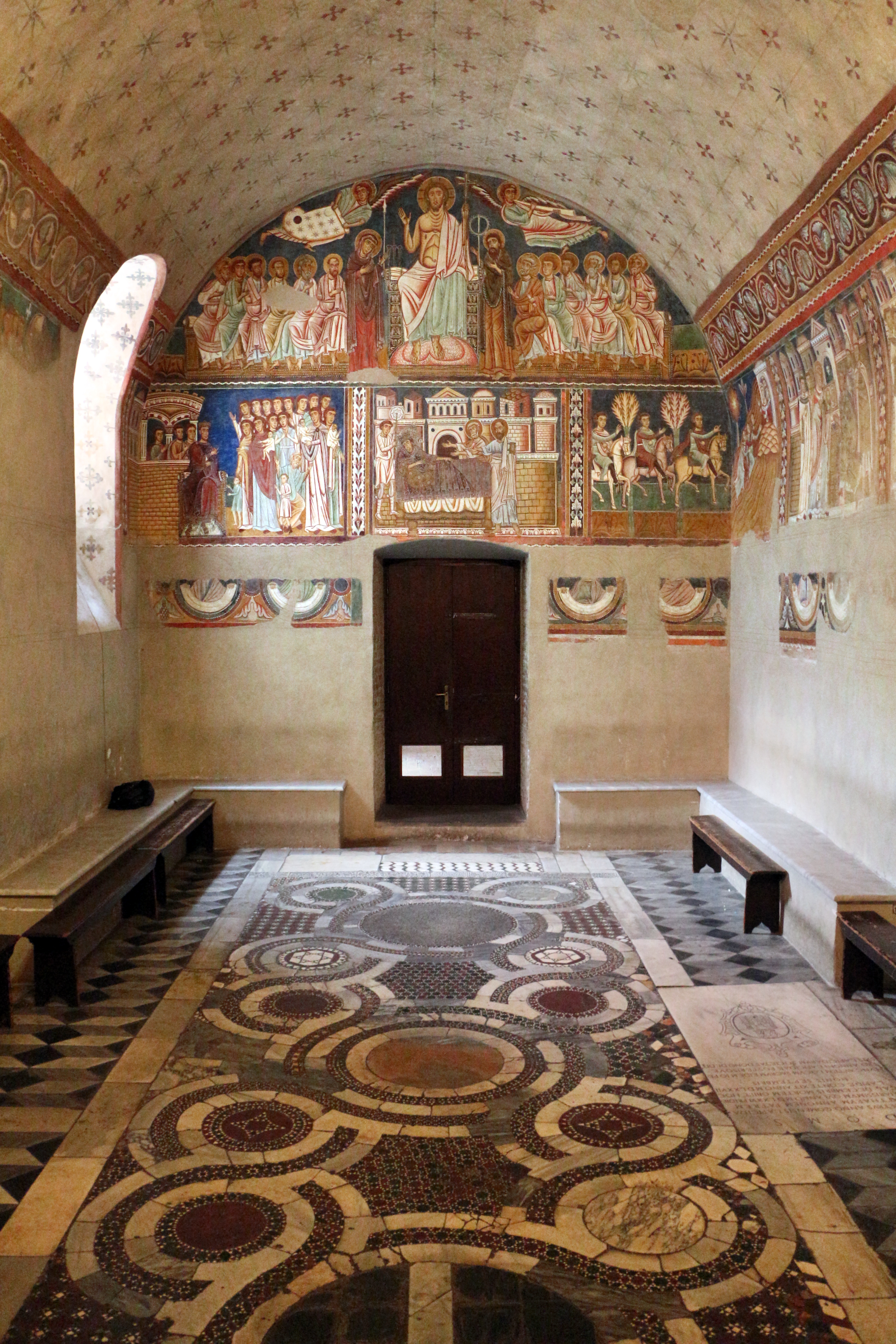
Chapel of St. Sylvester

The apse contains the frescoes (1630) by Giovanni da San Giovanni of the four patron martyr saints, Severo, Severiano, Carpoforo e Vittorino. The altarpiece on the left nave of S.Sebastiano curato da Lucina e Irene was painted by Giovanni Baglione. The second courtyard holds the entrance to the Oratorio di San Silvestro, with frescoes of medieval origin, as well as others by Raffaellino da Reggio.

== Titular see ==
Santi Quattro Coronati belongs to the titular churches of Rome from at least the end of 6th century. The title is now held by Cardinal Roger Mahony, Archbishop emeritus of Los Angeles. Among those once assigned the title are: Pope Leo IV (847), King Henry of Portugal, who, in 1580, donated the magnificent wooden ceiling, and Pope Benedict XV (1914). The full list is known only from the pontificate of Pope Benedict XII (1334–1342):

- Fortunato (595)
- Teofano (745)
- Constantino (761)
- Leo (844–847)
- Leo (853)
- Leonino (869)
- Stefano (882–885)
- Teofilatto (963–964)
- Giovanni (993)
- Hermann of Brescia (ca.1080–1098)
- Agostino (1100–after 1103)
- Benedetto of Terra Maggiore (obedience of Anacletus II, 1135–1137/38)
- Guillaume de Court, O.Cist. (1338–1350)
- Pierre Itier (1361–1364)
- Jean de Dormans (1368–1373)
- Hughes de Montelais (1375–1378, obedience of Avignon 1378–1379)
- Demetrius (1378–1387)
- Jean de Neufchatel (obedience of Avignon 1383–1392)
- Francesco Uguccione (1405–1412)
- Alfonso Carrillo de Albornoz (1423–1434)
- Louis de Luxembourg (1440–1442)
- Alfonso Borja (1444–1455)
- Luis Juan del Milà y Borja (1456–1508)
- Lorenzo Pucci (1513–1524)
- Antonio Pucci (1531–1541)
- Roberto Pucci (1544–1547)
- Henrique de Portugal (1547–1580)
- Giovan Antonio Facchinetti (1584–1591)
- Giovanni Antonio Facchinetti de Nuce (1592–1602)
- Giovanni Garzia Mellini (1608–1627)
- Girolamo Vidoni (1627–1632)
- Francesco Boncompagni (1634–1641)
- Cesare Facchinetti (1643–1671)
- Francesco Albizzi (1671–1680)
- Sebastiano Antonio Tanara (1696–1715)
- Giovanni Patrizi (1716–1727)
- Alessandro Aldobrandini (1731–1734)
- Joaquín Fernández Portocarrero (1743–1747)
- Giovanni Battista Mesmer (1747–1749)
- Carlo Francesco Durini (1754–1769)
- Christoph Anton von Migazzi von Waal und Sonnenthurn (1775–1803)
- Lodovico Micara, O.F.M.Cap. (1826–1837)
- Giovanni Soglia Ceroni (1839–1856)
- Antonino Saverio De Luca (1863–1878)
- Americo Ferreira dos Santos Silva (1880–1899)
- Pietro Respighi (1899–1913)
- Giacomo della Chiesa (1914)
- Victoriano Guisasola Menéndez (1914–1920)
- Karl Joseph Schulte (1921–1941)
- Norman Thomas Gilroy (1946–1977)
- Julijans Vaivods (1983–1990)
- Roger Michael Mahony (1991–present)

== Discovered frescoes ==
In 2002 art historian Andreina Draghi discovered an amazing display of frescoes, dating back to 13th century, while restoring the Gothic Hall of the monastery. Most of the scenes were well preserved under a thick layer of plaster, and represented the Twelve Months, the Liberal Arts, the Four Seasons and the Zodiac. The image of King Solomon, a pious and a judge, painted on the northern wall led scholars to argue the room was meant to be a Hall of Justice. Plaster was possibly laid after 1348 Black Death for hygienical reasons, or perhaps in the 15th century, when the Camaldolese left the monastery.

Preceded by Santa Pudenziana	Landmarks of Rome; Santi Quattro Coronati	Succeeded by San Saba, Rome
