= Santa Maria in Via =

- Church of Saint Mary on the (Flaminian) Way
- Chiesa di Santa Maria in Via
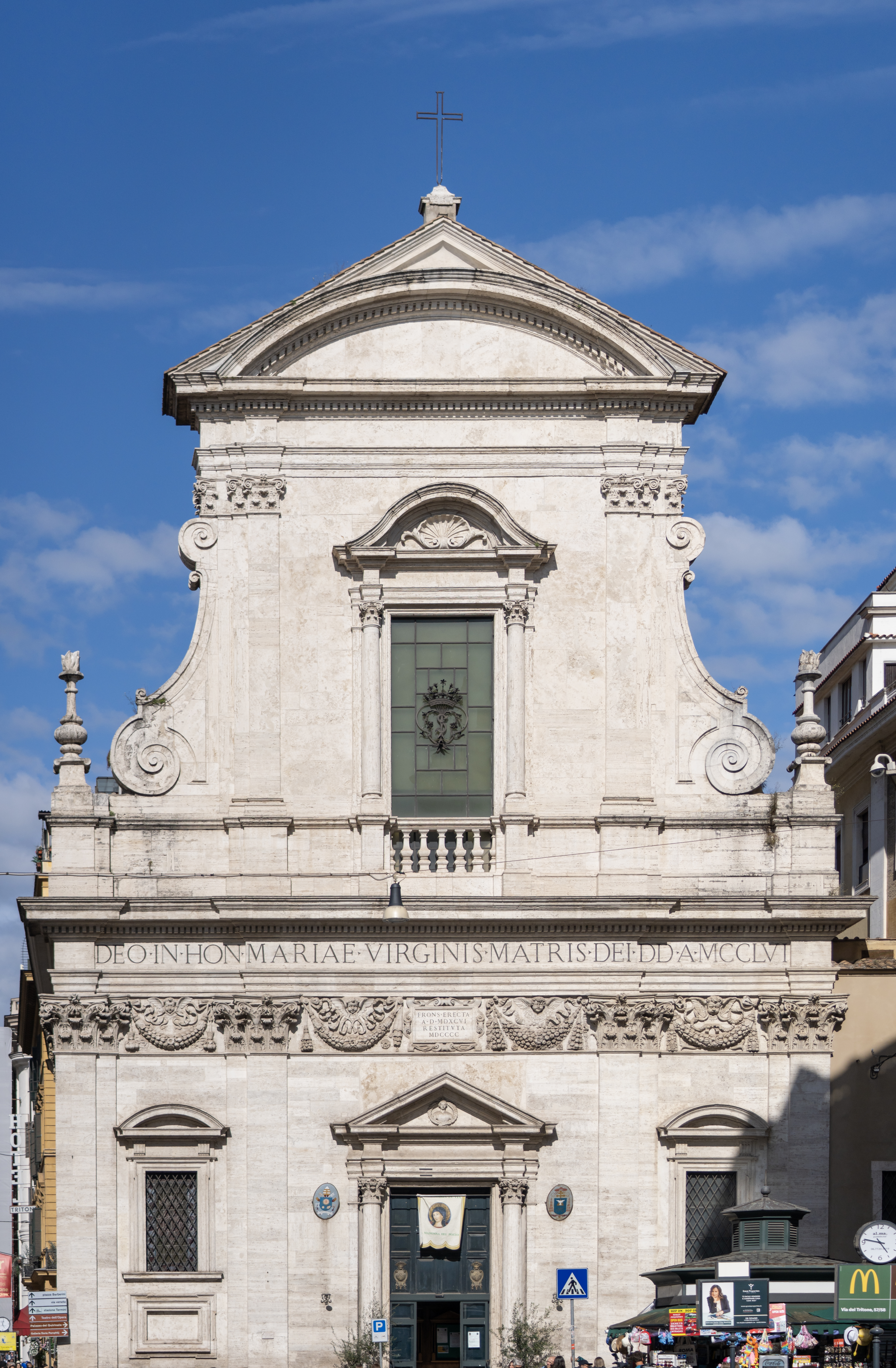
- The facade of Santa Maria in Via was designed by Giacomo della Porta.
- Click on the map for a fullscreen view
- 41°54′06″N 12°28′54″E
- Location: Via del Mortaro 24, Rome
- Country: Italy
- Language: Italian
- Denomination: Catholic
- Tradition: Roman Rite
- Religious order: Servite Order
- Website: madonnadelpozzo.it

History
- Status: titular church, national church
- Founded: 10th century?
- Dedication: Mary, mother of Jesus

Architecture
- Architect(s): Francesco da Volterra, Carlo Lombardi
- Architectural type: Baroque
- Completed: 1513

Administration
- Diocese: Rome

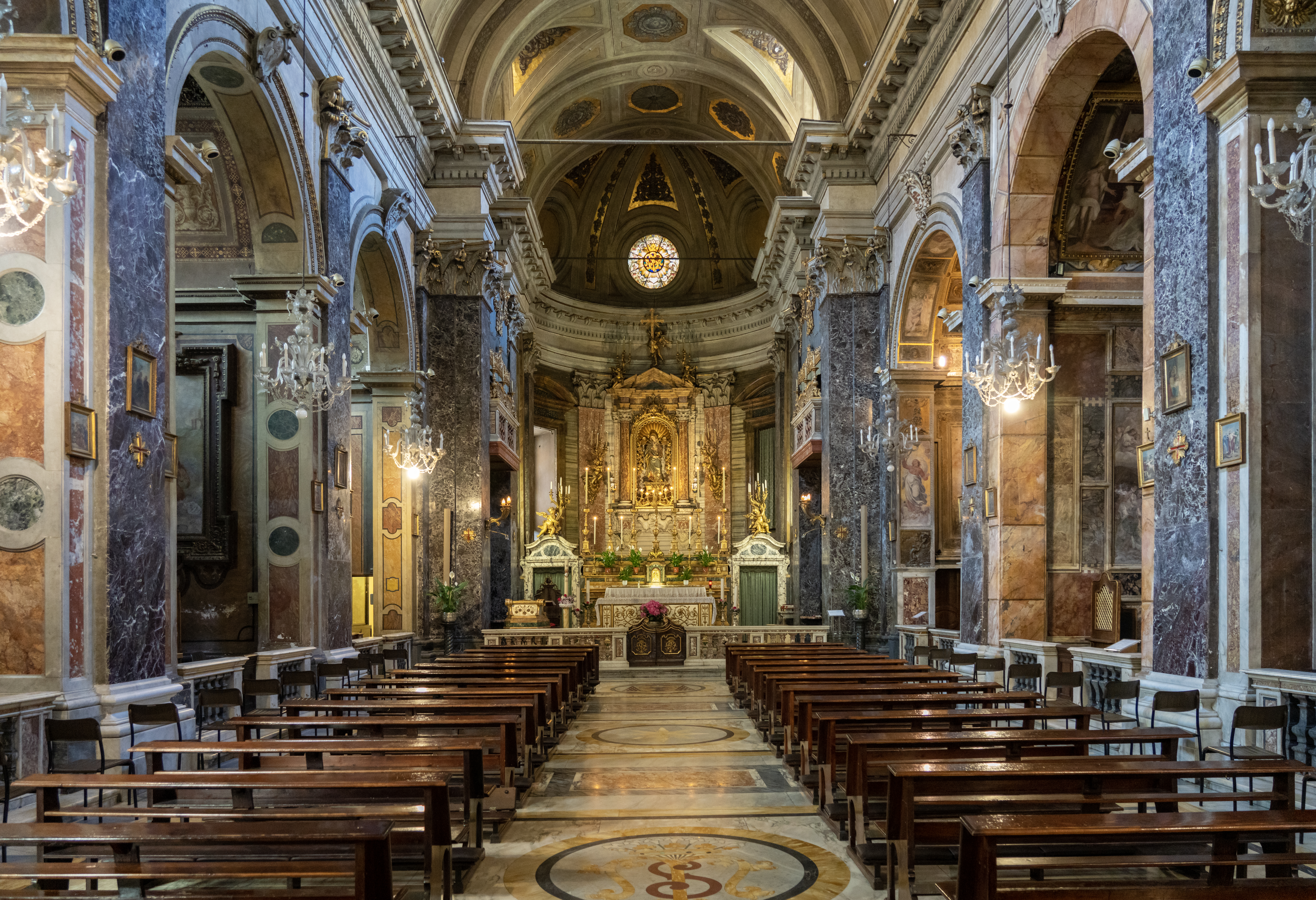
Interior

Santa Maria in Via is a church in Rome. The church or a chapel existed in the 9th century, but was rebuilt following reports of a miracle. In 1165, it is recorded as Santa Maria in Via, whose appellative means "on the Way", with a reference to the nearby Via Flaminia.

== History ==
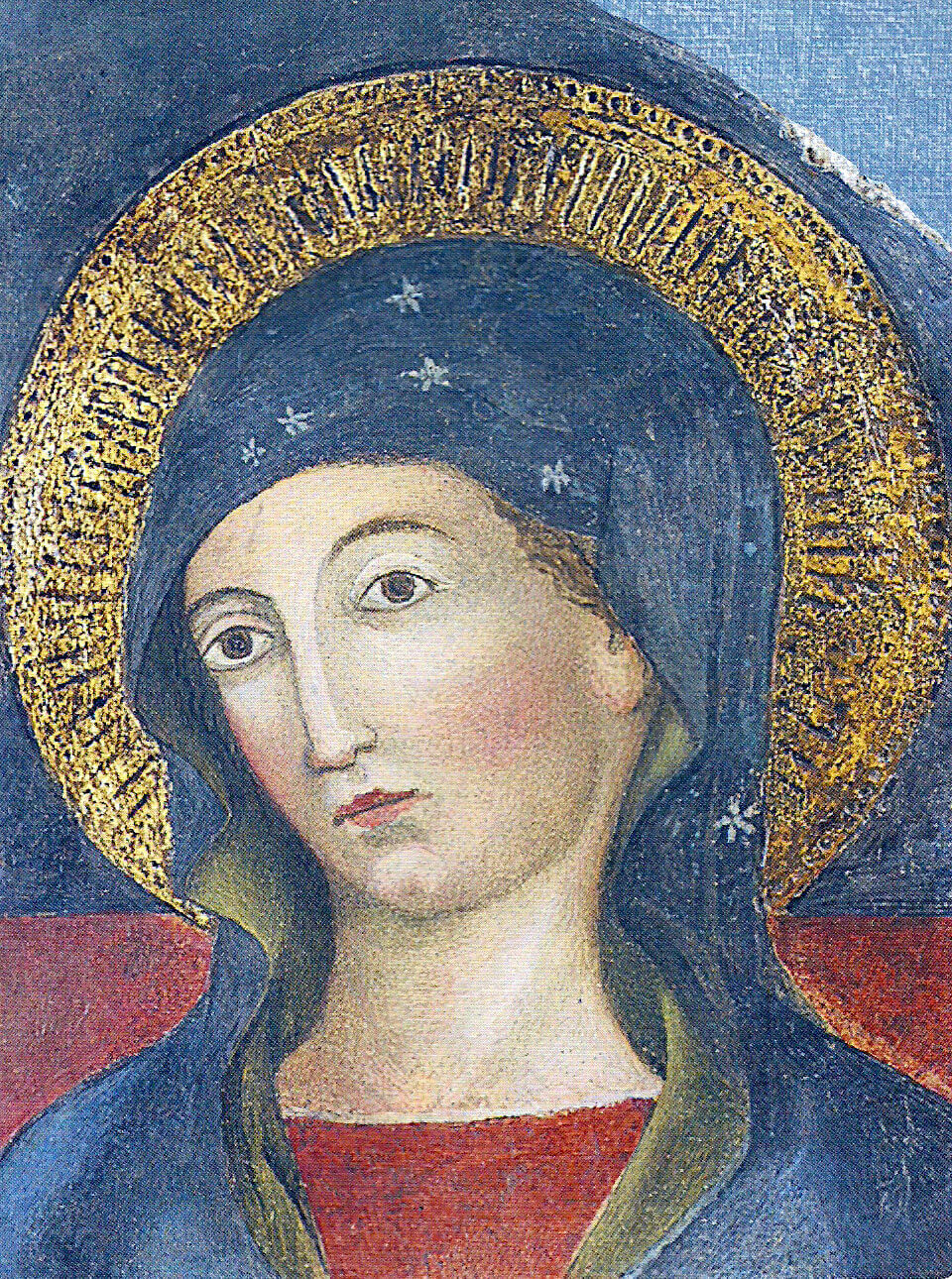
the painting of the Madonna which was floating on the water

On the site there was the house of Cardinal Pietro Capocci, with a well in the stables. On the night of 26 September 1256, the well overflowed. A picture of Our Lady was floating on the waters, which disappeared as soon as the picture was taken. Pope Alexander IV declared it a miracle, and ordered the construction of a chapel on its place; in the chapel (the first on the right of the current church) there is still the well of the miracle.

Pope Innocent VIII ordered the construction of the current church, which was built in 1491–1513. Renovations were performed under Francesco da Volterra and later by Carlo Lombardi. The façade and portico were designed by Pietro da Cortona (1660). The main altar was decorated by Santi Ghetti. The works were completed under Cardinal Saint Robert Bellarmine, titular of the church, in 1604.

The church of S. Maria in Via now serves as a national church in Rome for the Ecuadorian community.

The church has been served by the Servite Order since a grant of Pope Leo X in 1513.

== Cardinal Priests ==
The Titulus S. Mariae in Via was instituted by Pope Julius III in 1551. The occupants of the titulus have been:

- Fulvio Giulio della Corgna, O.S.Io.Hieros. (4 December 1551 — 29 May 1555) translated to Cardinal-Priest of San Bartolomeo all’Isola
- Giacomo Puteo (29 May 1555 — 26 April 1563)
- Alessandro Sforza (15 May 1565 — 16 May 1581)
- Vincenzo Lauro (20 May 1585 — 2 March 1589) translated to Cardinal-Priest of San Clemente
- Gianfrancesco Morosini (28 March 1590 — 10 January 1596)
- Silvio Savelli (21 June 1596 — 22 January 1599)
- Roberto Bellarmino, S.J. (17 March 1599 — 1 June 1605) translated to Cardinal-Priest of San Matteo in Merulana)
- Stefano Pignatelli (3 March 1621 — 12 August 1623)
- Gil Carrillo de Albornoz (12 August 1630 — 2 August 1643) translated to Cardinal-Priest of San Pietro in Montorio
- Francesco Angelo Rapaccioli (14 December 1643 — 21 November 1650) translated to Cardinal-Priest of Santa Cecilia
- Carlo Rossetti (18 August 1653 — 9 March 1654) translated to Cardinal-Priest of San Silvestro in Capite
- Francesco Albizzi (23 March 1654 – 24 August 1671) Appointed Cardinal-Priest of Santi Quattro Coronati
- César d'Estrées (8 August 1672 – 28 January 1675) Appointed Cardinal-Priest of Santissima Trinità al Monte Pincio
- Carlo Carafa della Spina, C.R. (27 May 1675 – 19 Oct 1680)
- Francesco Maidalchini (19 October 1689 – 23 July 1691) Appointed, Cardinal-Priest of Santa Prassede
- Giacomo Boncompagni (2 January 1696 – 12 June 1724) Appointed Cardinal-Bishop of Albano
- Melchior de Polignac (20 November 1724 – 19 December 1725) Appointed Cardinal-Priest of Santa Maria degli Angeli
- Francesco Antonio Finy (8 March 1728 – 6 July 1729) Appointed, Cardinal-Priest of San Sisto
- Carlo Vincenzo Maria Ferreri Thaon, O.P. (23 December 1729 – 9 December 1742)
- Giuseppe Pozzobonelli (23 September 1743 – 2 Aug 1758 Appointed, Cardinal-Priest of Santa Maria sopra Minerva)
- Pietro Francesco Bussi (19 November 1759 – 10 September 1765)
- Antonio Branciforte Colonna (6 April 1767 – 31 July 1786)
- Girolamo della Porta (23 February 1801 – 20 September 1802) Appointed Cardinal-Priest of San Pietro in Vincoli
- Michele Di Pietro (20 September 1802 – 8 March 1816) Appointed, Cardinal-Bishop of Albano
- Giorgio Doria Pamphilj Landi (22 July 1816 – 16 March 18180 Appointed Cardinal-Priest of Santa Cecilia
- Carlo Maria Pedicini (16 May 1823 – 15 December 1828) Appointed Cardinal-Priest of Santa Maria della Pace
- Luigi Amat di San Filippo e Sorso (19 May 1837– 15 March 1852) Appointed Cardinal-Bishop of Palestrina
- François-Auguste-Ferdinand Donnet (27 June 1853 – 23 December 1882)
- François-Marie-Benjamin Richard de la Vergne (30 December 1889 – 28 January 1908)
- Agostino Richelmy (27 November 1911 – 10 August 1923)
- Patrick Joseph Hayes (27 March 1924 – 4 September 1938)
- Thomas Tien Ken-sin, S.V.D (18 February 1946 – 24 July 1967)
- Paul Yoshigoro Taguchi (5 March 1973 – 23 February 1978)
- Joseph-Marie Trịnh Văn Căn (30 June 1979 – 18 May 1990)
- Egano Righi-Lambertini (26 November 1990 – 4 October 2000)
- Antonio José González Zumárraga, Ecuador (21 February 2001 – 13 October 2008)
- Raúl Eduardo Vela Chiriboga, Ecuador (20 November 2010 – 15 November 2020)
- Filipe Neri Ferrão, Goa, India (27 August 2022 – present)

== Bibliography ==
- Mariano Armellini, Le chiese di Roma, dalle loro origine sino al secolo XVI (Roma: Tipografia editrice Romana, 1887), pp. 334–336.
- Carlo Cecchelli, S. Maria in Via (Rome: Casa Editrice "Roma" 192?) [Le Chiese di Roma illustrate, n. 14].
- "Santa Maria in Via", by Chris Nyborg.

Preceded by Santa Maria in Trastevere	Landmarks of Rome; Santa Maria in Via	Succeeded by Santa Maria in Via Lata
