= Stefano Pignatelli =

Stefano Pignatelli (Perugia, 1578 – Rome, 12 August 1623) was an Italian cardinal.

Despite his surname, he was not a member of the well-known Neapolitan noble family. His father was a potter. He completed his studies in law at the University of Perugia, where he became an intimate friend of the future cardinal Scipione Caffarelli-Borghese, and was asked to accompany Borghese when he was called to Rome upon the election of his uncle as Pope Paul V. His closeness to Borghese eventually led to himself being created a cardinal in the consistory of 11 January 1621 with the title of Santa Maria in Via.

According to Cardella, the envy of the papal court made some cardinals and ambassadors on two occasions accuse him before the pope of having improper influence over Scipione Borghese (perhaps of a sexual nature), and asked for him to be excluded. In both cases, he was cleared of the accusations.

Pignatelli demonstrated himself worthy of the episcopal purple, however, and participated in the conclaves of 1621, which elected Pope Gregory XV; and in the conclave of 1623, which elected Pope Urban VIII. He was a particular patron of the arts - commissioning pictures by Guercino and music for the lute and guitar by Giovanni Girolamo Kapsberger.

He died of an acute fever in 1623, and was buried in Rome, in the basilica of Santa Maria sopra Minerva.

== Sources ==
- The Cardinals of the Holy Roman Church
