= Francesco Boncompagni =

- Cardinal-Priest of Santi Quattro Coronati
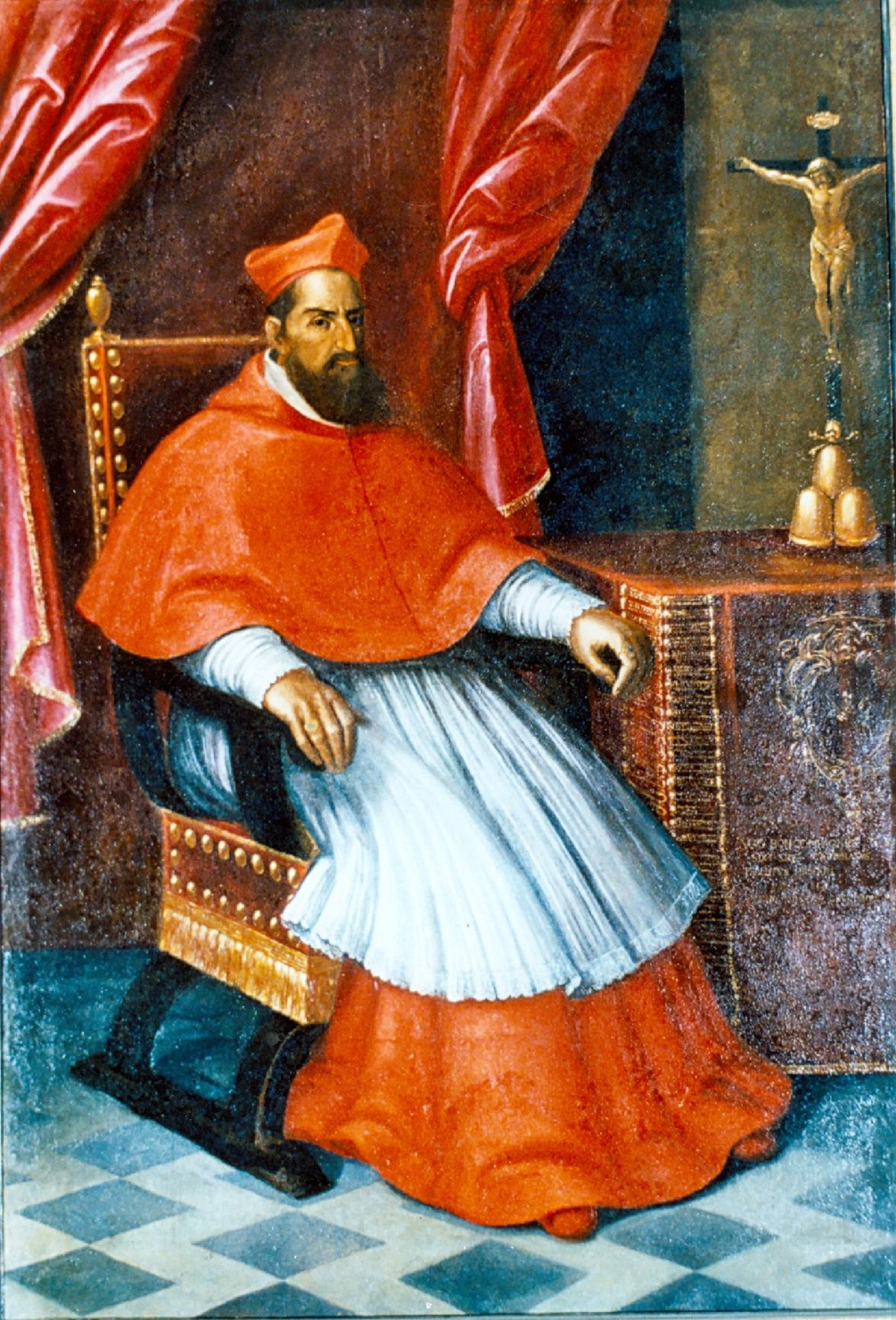
- Church: Catholic Church
- See: Santi Quattro Coronati
- In office: 6 February 1634 – 9 December 1641
- Predecessor: Girolamo Vidoni
- Successor: Cesare Facchinetti
- Other posts: Archbishop of Naples (1626-1641); Cardinal-Deacon of Sant'Eustachio (1626-1634); Bishop of Fano (1622-1626); Cardinal-Deacon of Sant'Angelo in Pescheria (1621-1626)

Orders
- Consecration: 1623 by Marcello Crescenzi
- Created cardinal: 19 April 1621 by Pope Gregory XV

Personal details
- Born: 21 January 1592 Sora, Lazio, Duchy of Sora, Kingdom of Naples, Crown of Aragon
- Died: 9 December 1641 (aged 49) Naples, Kingdom of Naples, Crown of Aragon

Don Francesco Boncompagni (21 January 1592 – 9 December 1641) was an Italian Cardinal, made cardinal in 1621.

== Biography ==
Born at Sora, son of Giacomo Boncompagni, 1st Duke of Sora, Aquino, Arce and Arpino, 1st Marquess of Vignola, and wife Costanza Sforza di Santa Fiore. Grand-nephew of Pope Gregory XV. He was a nephew of Cardinals by both maternal and paternal sides: Filippo Boncompagni (1572) and Francesco Sforza (1583). He was the uncle of Cardinal Girolamo Boncompagni, and grand-uncle of a second Cardinal Giacomo Boncompagni.

Filippo studied at the University of Bologna, where he earned a doctorate in utroque iure, both canon and civil law, on 20 May 1615. He entered the priesthood while in Naples, and in 1607, he became Abbot commendatario of S. Maria a Capella, Naples. He moved to Rome and was named referendary of the Tribunals of the Apostolic Signature of Justice and of Grace in 1615. He was briefly vice-governor of Fermo in 1621.

He was created cardinal deacon in the consistory of 19 April 1621; received a dispensation for having an uncle in the Sacred College of Cardinals

He participated in the conclave of 1623, which elected Pope Urban VIII. Returned to Rome in 1626. Promoted to the metropolitan see of Naples in 1626. He died in Naples and is buried in the Cathedral.
