= Scrutiny =

Careful examination or inquiry

Scrutiny (French: scrutin; Late Latin: scrutinium; from scrutari, meaning "those who search through piles of rubbish in the hope of finding something of value" and originally from the Latin "scruta," meaning "broken things, rags, or rubbish.") is a careful examination or inquiry (often implying the search for a likely mistake or deficiency). In Roman times, the "scrutari" of cities and towns were those who laboriously searched for valuables amidst the waste and cast-offs of others. The modern English "scrutiny" is derived from this root, indicating a careful examination or inquiry (often implying the search for a hidden mistake, misstatement, or incongruity).

The word is specifically applied in the early Roman Catholic Church to the examination of the catechumens or those under instruction in the faith. They were taught the creed and the Lord's Prayer, examined therein, and exorcized prior to baptism. The days of scrutiny varied at different periods from three to seven. From about the beginning of the 12th century, when it became usual to baptize infants soon after their birth instead of at stated times (Easter and Pentecost), the ceremony of scrutiny was incorporated with that of the actual baptism.

Currently, there are three moments for the scrutinies to occur: the 3rd, 4th, and 5th Sundays of Lent. These are done in public in front of the entire congregation, and the candidates are dismissed before the Prayer of the Faithful. Only under grave circumstances can the scrutinies be dispensed, and only then by the local ordinary (who can dispense only two at most). The scrutinies are fully intended for the catechumens (i.e., those who are to receive Baptism, Communion, and Confirmation).

Scrutiny is also a term applied to a method of electing a pope in the Catholic Church, in contradistinction to two other methods, acclamation and accession. In the law of elections, scrutiny is the careful examination of votes cast after the unsuccessful candidate has lodged a petition claiming the seat, and alleging that he has the majority of legal votes. Each vote is dealt with separately, notice being given beforehand by one party to the other of the votes objected to and the grounds of objection.
