= 1669–1670 conclave =

Election of Catholic Pope Clement X

Papal conclave 1669–70

Dates and location
- 21 December 1669 – 29 April 1670; Apostolic Palace, Papal States

Elected pope
- Emilio Altieri; Name taken: Clement X
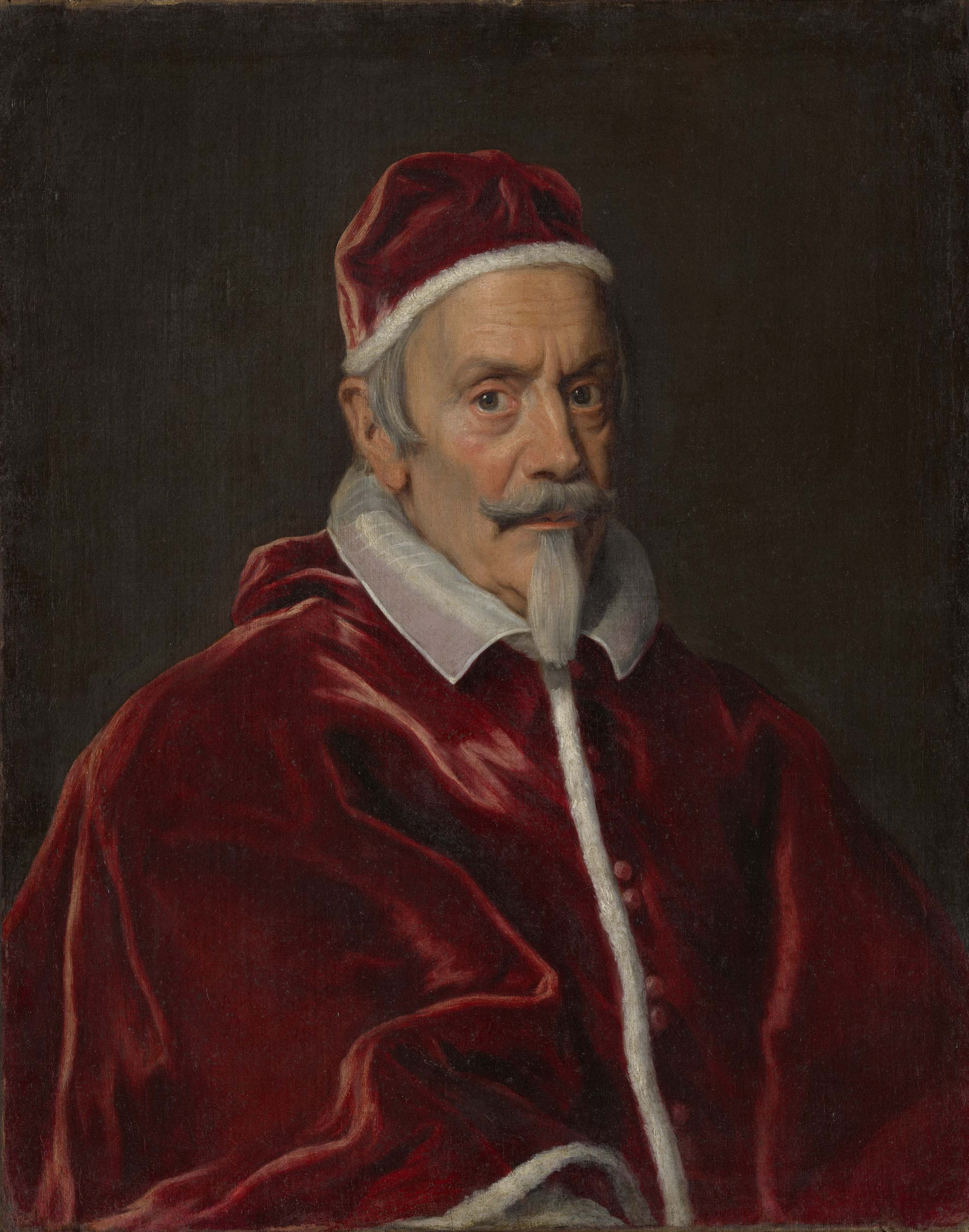

The 1669–70 papal conclave (21 December – 29 April) was convened on the death of Pope Clement IX and ended with the election of Cardinal Emilio Altieri as Pope Clement X. The election saw deference within the College of Cardinals to Louis XIV of France, and a freeing of the cardinals loyal to Spain to vote according to their conscience. Eventually the elderly Altieri was elected with support of the major factions within the College.

== Background ==
Clement IX had primarily named Italian cardinals to the college, only appointing one French and one Spanish cardinal when he needed their assistance to fight back an invasion by the Ottoman Empire in Crete. He created his friends cardinals, with seven of the twelve that he created coming from his native Tuscany. Clement did not feel obligated to appoint a German cardinal because the Holy Roman Emperor had requested his assistance in Hungary. Within days of his death Clement IX had created seven additional cardinals, which brought the number of potential electors to its maximum of seventy.

During his pontificate Clement strove diplomatically to bring Western European nations to the defense of Crete. The Ottomans were planning to advance on the Venetian owned capital of the island at Candia. He intervened in the War of Devolution and helped negotiate a peace, which increased the likelihood that Spain and France would both aid Crete. The French initially sent a small force to aid Crete in 1668, before increasing their troop commitment in 1669. This did affect the outcome of the Ottoman advance, and they captured Candia in September 1669.

Within the College of Cardinals a faction of cardinals that was not loyal to any of the Catholic monarchies had developed; they were called the Squadrone Volante and had risen during the conclave of 1655. The name, which translates as Flying Squadron, was given because of their support of candidates who they believed had the best interest of the papacy in mind, rather than candidates supported by the secular monarch. Christina, Queen of Sweden, who had abdicated the Swedish throne and moved to Rome before converting to the Catholic Church, served as the secular supporter of the group, and became particularly close to Decio Azzolino.

== Conclave ==
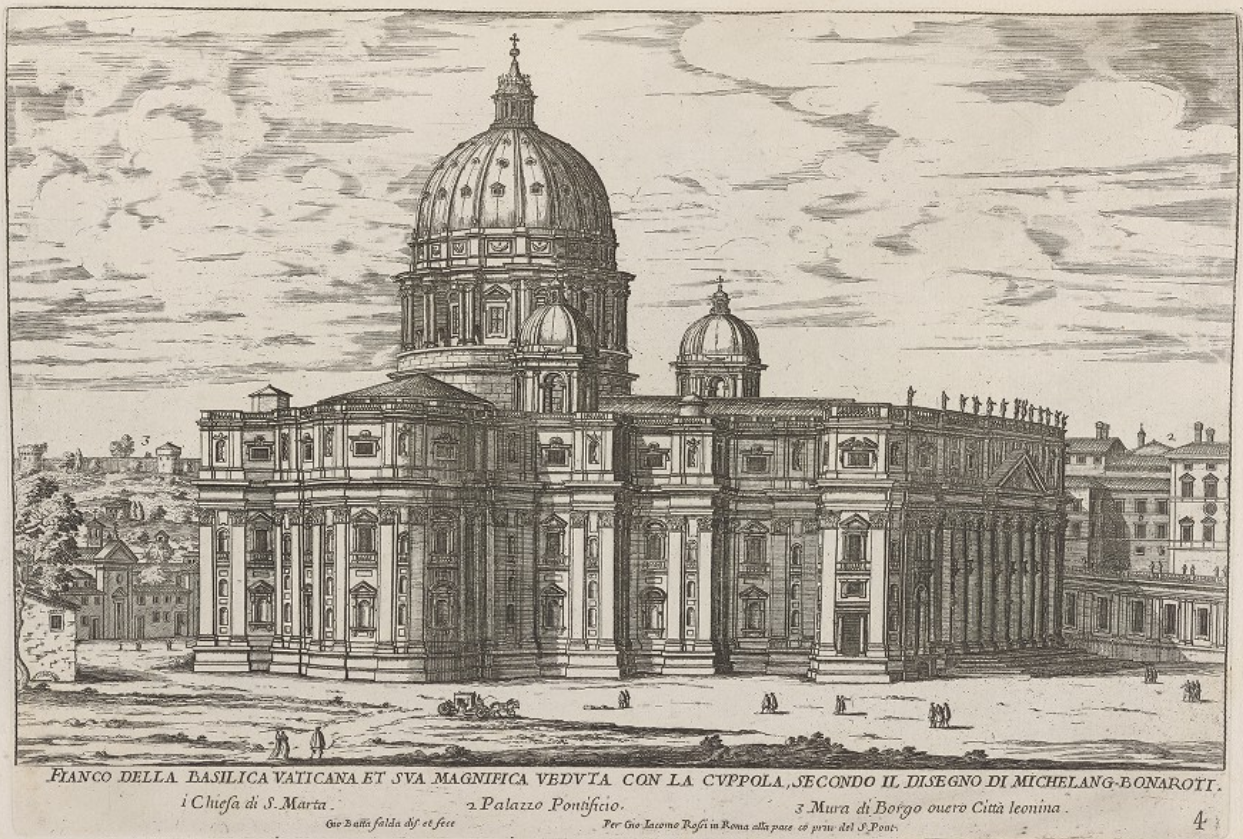
Engraving of St Peter's Basilica, c. 1667–79

The cardinals delayed the conclave until the ambassador of Louis XIV of France and the French cardinals arrived, which demonstrated the influence France had in the College at that time. When it opened on 21 December 1669, fifty-four of the seventy members of the College of Cardinals were present, and twelve additional cardinals arrived as the conclave progressed. The factions broke down relatively evenly between the cardinals loyal to Spain and France, with each country controlling eight. Clement IX's nephew Jacopo Rospigliosi's influence in the conclave was relatively weak as Clement IX had only created eight cardinals, whereas Flavio Chigi led twenty-four creations of Pope Alexander VII.

The College of Cardinals at the time did not have any cardinals that stood out as the obvious frontrunner, and the number of papabili was greater than at most conclaves. Accounts from contemporary sources listed up to 21 cardinals who were considered to have a chance of being elected pope.

Pietro Vidoni had the support of members of the Flying Squadron as well as Christina of Sweden and her ally Azzolino. Also, he was opposed by neither France nor Spain. Francesco Barberini, the Dean of the College of Cardinals, opposed Vidoni because he had not been asked about his candidacy previously.

Charles d'Albert d'Ailly, the French ambassador to the conclave, arrived on 16 January 1670. He announced on 10 February that Louis XIV had vetoed Chigi's candidate for the papacy, Scipione Pannocchieschi d’Elci. The exclusion caused d'Elci much embarrassment, and he became sick and quickly died after the French veto was announced. Following d'Elci's exclusion, there was confusion amongst the cardinals about whom they should elect, because none of the existing candidates had the numerical possibility of being elected pope.

The cardinals then attempted to elect Vidoni again, but Chigi was now opposed to him out of anger at the French for excluding d'Elci. The Spanish cardinals also worked against Vidoni, implying at one point that Mariana of Austria, the Queen regent of Spain, had excluded Vidoni's candidacy. The Spanish then attempted to elect Benedetto Odescalchi, but d'Ailly declared that no one would be allowed to be elected unless they owed loyalty to Louis XIV. The Spanish soon sent word that their cardinals were free to vote for anyone. The letter was brought by courier and announced that Mariana of Austria had not actually excluded Vidoni nor any member of the college.

== Election of Clement X ==
In late April all the factions except the Flying Squadron had disappeared, and the cardinals had agreed to elect Emilio Altieri. On 29 April 1670 Altieri received three votes at the scrutiny in the morning, which was the same number he had received consistently since the beginning of the conclave. At the afternoon scrutiny, he received twenty-one votes, and was shortly acclaimed pope by an additional thirty-five cardinals. This brought his final total to fifty-six out of a total possible of fifty-nine electors. Altieri was old and was in poor health, and resisted his own election to the point where he had to be dragged out of his room by two cardinals in order to be acclaimed. His election took place at 3 pm, but he resisted being elected for an hour. He took the name Clement in honour of Clement IX, who had created him a cardinal. At the age of 79, Altieri is the oldest person to have been elected pope.
