= Squadrone Volante =

The Squadrone Volante ("Flying Squad") was a 17th-century group of independent and liberal cardinals within the College of Cardinals of the Roman Catholic Church. It attempted to influence the outcome of a number of papal conclaves.

== History ==
At the death of Pope Innocent X, Innocent's third and final Cardinal-Nephew, Camillo Astalli, had fallen into disrepute. Though he remained a Cardinal and would participate in the conclave, he did not control the College in the same way as the Barberini had tried to control the previous conclave.

A group of cardinals, led by Cardinal Decio Azzolino, began to further the view within the College that it was time for a pope who would lead the Catholic Church away from the nepotism which had caused the Church considerable suffering over the preceding decades. Azzolino was also the representative of the very-much-in-fashion Christina, Queen of Sweden.

== Conclave of 1655 ==
The conclave of 1655 was straightforward enough – the cardinals wanted an end to nepotism and the Squadrone could provide exactly that. Cardinal Pietro Ottoboni (later elected Pope Alexander VIII) is said to have exclaimed, "this time we must seek an honest man!". Azzolino gave his reply; "If you want an honest man, there stands one" and pointed to Cardinal Fabio Chigi.

== Conclave of 1667 ==
Still protected by Christina of Sweden and led by her now-favourite Azzolino, the Squadrone continued to operate during Pope Alexander's reign and remained highly involved in European politics in the second half of the 17th century.

In 1667, Alexander died and the College of Cardinals again convened for the papal conclave of 1667.

Rospigliosi was elected and took the throne as Pope Clement IX.

Adding further credence to the alleged involvement of the Squadrone, Rospigliosi, who was Cardinal Secretary of State, resigned the post and appointed Cardinal Azzolino as his replacement on the very night he was elected.

== See also ==
- Roman Curia
- Saint Gallen Group
