= 1667 conclave =

Election of Catholic Pope Clement IX

Papal conclave June 1667

Dates and location
- 2–20 June 1667; Apostolic Palace, Papal States

Elected pope
- Giulio Rospigliosi; Name taken: Clement IX
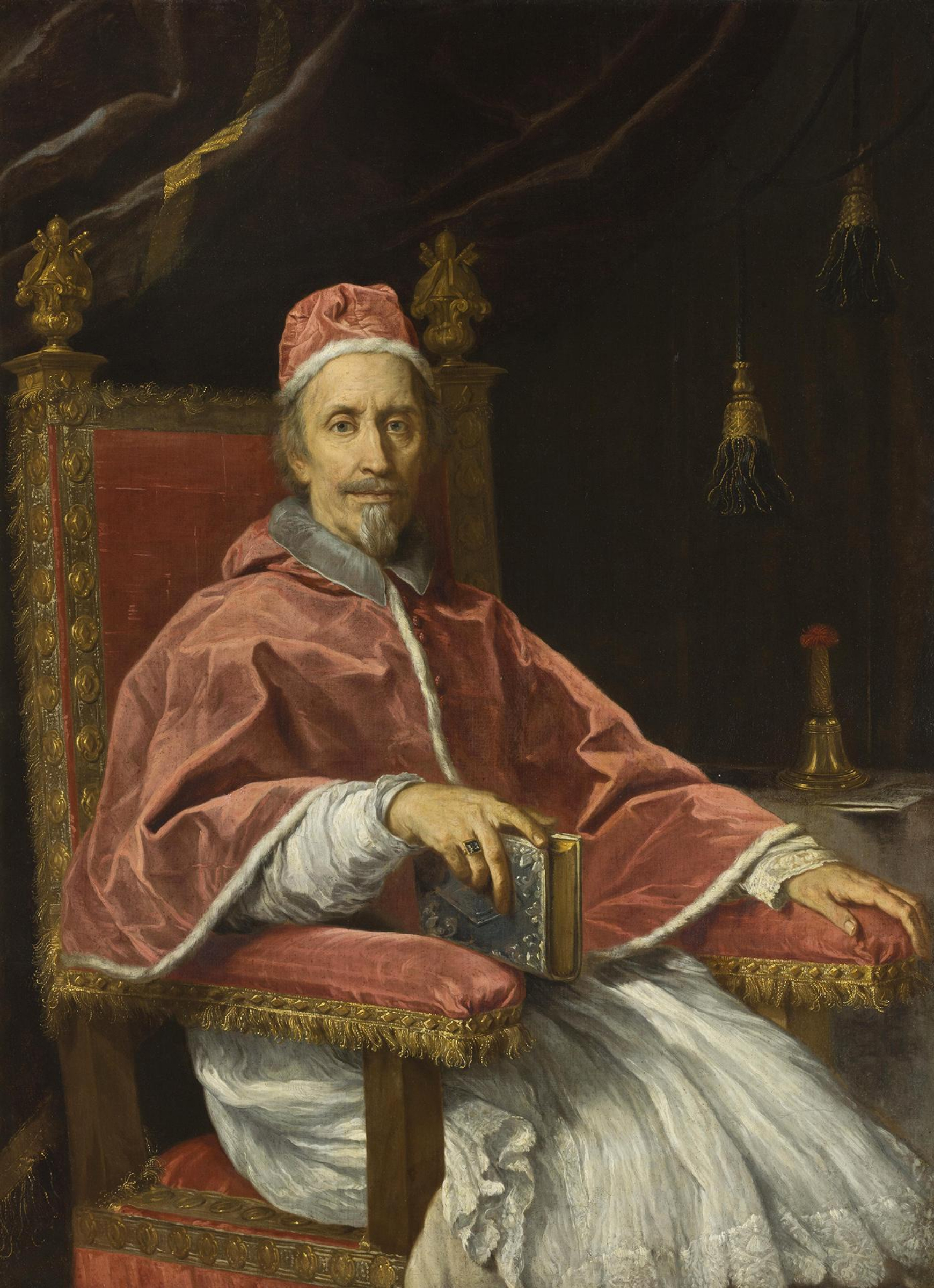

The 1667 conclave was convened on the death of Pope Alexander VII and ended with the election of Cardinal Giulio Rospigliosi as Pope Clement IX. The conclave was dominated by factions loyal to the cardinal nephews of Alexander VII and Urban VIII. It saw the continued existence of the Squadrone Volante, or Flying Squadron, that had emerged in the 1655 conclave. The conclave also saw Spain and France, the two largest Catholic powers at the time, both support Rospigliosi's election as pope. Ultimately, Rospigliosi's election was achieved when the French ambassador bribed Flavio Chigi, Alexander's nephew, to support Rospigliosi. Following the conclave all the parties believed they had elected the pope that they had wanted.

== Background ==
After his election Alexander VII had initially been opposed to nepotism, refusing to name a cardinal nephew. Members of the College of Cardinals urged him to reconsider appointing members of his family to positions of power, and he eventually relented, naming fellow members of his Chigi family to the papal government and appointing a cardinal nephew.

The diplomatic relationship between France and the Papal States became worse while Alexander was pope. France had invaded Avignon in 1664 after a confrontation between France's ambassador to the Holy See and papal troops. The French forces left Avignon only after an apology was rendered by Alexander. Cardinal Mazarin, the leader of the French government, further urged Alexander to create more French cardinals, but he did not do so. During his pontificate Alexander created 40 new cardinals with 33 of them being Italians.

Within the College of Cardinals a faction of cardinals that was not loyal to any of the Catholic monarchies were called the Squadrone Volante, and had risen during the conclave of 1655. The name, which translates as Flying Squadron, was given because of their support of candidates who they believed had the best interest of the papacy in mind rather than candidates supported by the secular monarch. Christina, Queen of Sweden, who had abdicated the Swedish throne and moved to Rome before converting to the Catholic Church, served as the secular supporter of the group, and became particularly close to Decio Azzolino.

== Conclave ==
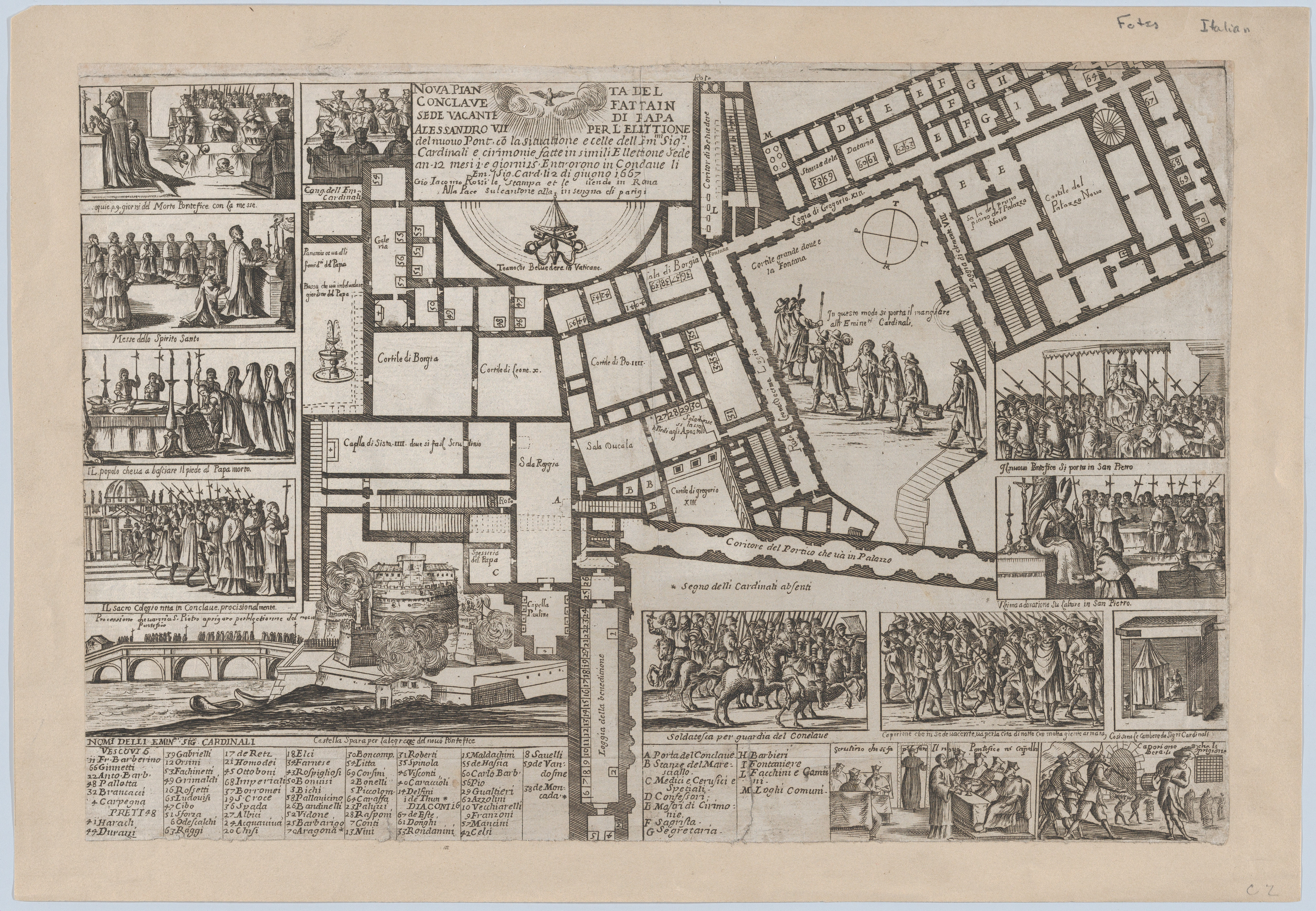
Etching by Giovanni Giacomo de Rossi with a map of the Vatican City and scenes of the opening of the conclave following the funeral of Alexander VII

When the conclave opened it had 64 cardinal electors present. At the time of Alexander's death, the College was at its then-maximum capacity of 70 members. Between the time of his death and the opening of the conclave on 2 June 1667, two of the cardinals had died, and four members had yet to arrive in Rome. Since the conclaves of 1605, the College had consistently maintained 60 or more members take place in the conclave, and crowding had become an issue. The College debated whether it would be appropriate to hold the conclave in the Vatican given concerns about crowding and deaths of cardinals in previous conclaves, but older cardinals insisted on holding the conclave there.

Alexander VII had created 34 of the cardinals present during the 1667 conclave. Of that group, 10 did not accept Flavio Chigi, Alexander's cardinal nephew, as their leader because his lifestyle was considered unseemly. Sixteen of the cardinals present in the conclave were creations of Urban VIII, and they all agreed to follow the lead of Antonio Barberini, one of Urban's nephews. The conclave was dominated by the parties loyal to the cardinal nephews, and electors who were loyal to various monarchs or were members of the Flying Squadron remained divided, splitting evenly between the two larger parties headed by the nephews. The French had eight electors who were loyal to them, and the Spanish had six, while the Flying Squadron had eleven.

From the beginning of the conclave, Giulio Rospigliosi was considered to be the papabile with the strongest chances. He was not opposed by any of the major factions at the conclave. Initially, the French sought to hide the fact that they supported Rospigliosi and promoted Scipione Pannocchieschi d’Elci for the papacy in order to allow the Spanish to support Rospigliosi, who was on good terms with the Spanish government. The Spanish, however, initially preferred the election of Francesco Barberini, another of Urban VIII's nephews.

The other serious candidate at the beginning of the conclave was Girolamo Farnese. Farnese was not acceptable to the Flying Squadron, which left the conclave with Rospigliosi and d'Elci as the only viable options. Flavio Chigi promoted d'Elci as a candidate, but he was considered too zealous by some of the electors.

== Election of Clement IX ==
On the morning of 20 June 1667 Rospigliosi received five votes during the first scrutiny. He had only received at most 10 votes during the scrutinies of the preceding weeks. Between the morning scrutiny and the one held in the evening, Charles d'Albert d'Ailly, the French ambassador in Rome, promised Flavio Chigi income from France. Chigi then agreed to convince the electors who were loyal to him to vote for Rospigliosi's election.

At the scrutiny that evening, Rospigliosi received 61 votes and was elected Pope Clement IX. Rospigliosi is the most recent pope to come from Tuscany. At the conclusion of the conclave, both France and Spain believed that they had succeeded in electing the pope that they had wanted.
