= 1676 conclave =

Election of Catholic Pope Innocent XI

Papal conclave August–September 1676

Dates and location
- 2 August – 21 September 1676; Apostolic Palace, Papal States

Elected pope
- Benedetto Odescalchi; Name taken: Innocent XI
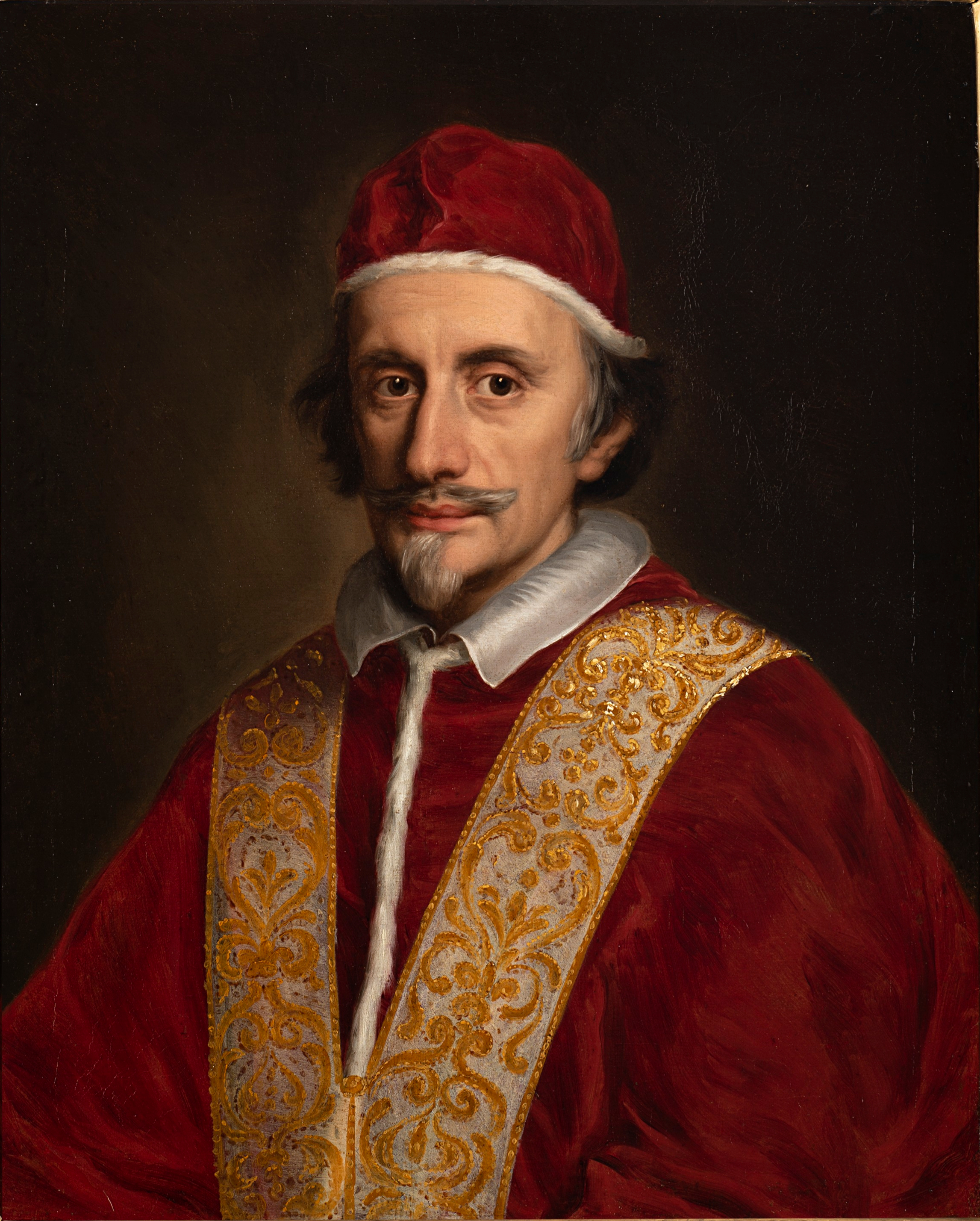

The 1676 papal conclave was convened after the death of Pope Clement X and lasted from 2 August until 21 September 1676. It led to the election of Cardinal Benedetto Odescalchi as Pope Innocent XI.

== Conclave ==
After the death of Pope Clement X on 22 July 1676, the College of Cardinals convened in Rome to elect a successor. The college consisted of 67 members: 44 of them took part at the opening of the conclave, and the number rose to 63 when others finally arrived from abroad. Seven of these cardinals had been created by Urban VIII, twelve by Innocent X, eight by Alexander VII, and nineteen by Clement IX and Clement X. Absent cardinals included Friedrich of Hessen and Pascal of Aragon.

A list was already in circulation indicating possible papal candidates. Only Cardinal Benedetto Odescalchi was suitably "papabile" at the time of the conclave. Odescalchi had emerged as a strong candidate for the papacy after the earlier death of Pope Clement IX on 9 December 1669, but the French Government had vetoed his nomination. After the death of Clement X, King Louis XIV of France had again intended to use his royal influence against the election of Odescalchi, whom he viewed as sympathetic to Spain. But, seeing that his popularity had grown among the cardinals as well as the Roman people, he reluctantly instructed the cardinals of the French party to acquiesce in his candidacy.

On the 1st ballot, held on 3 August 1676, Odescalchi received 14 votes. 13 other candidates remained in the running, with 25 abstentions. The number of candidates sank, but the vote on 20 September gave only 8 votes to Odescalchi. 19 votes were spread among cardinals Barberini, Rospigliosi and Alberizzi, while 30 cardinals abstained.

== Election of Innocent XI ==
Finally on 21 September, Odescalchi was surrounded in the chapel of the conclave and proclaimed pope by acclamation, rather than formal vote, each cardinal kissing his hand. Once pope-elect, Innocent XI made the College swear to the Conclave capitulation that had been drafted by the previous conclave before accepting his election, in an attempt to avoid any limits to the papal supremacy. Innocent was then formally enthroned as pope on 4 October 1676. Cardinals Virginio Orsini and Carlo Bonelli both died during the conclave.
