= 1655 conclave =

Election of Catholic Pope Alexander VII

Papal conclave January–April 1655

Dates and location
- 18 January – 7 April 1655; Apostolic Palace, Papal States

Elected pope
- Fabio Chigi; Name taken: Alexander VII
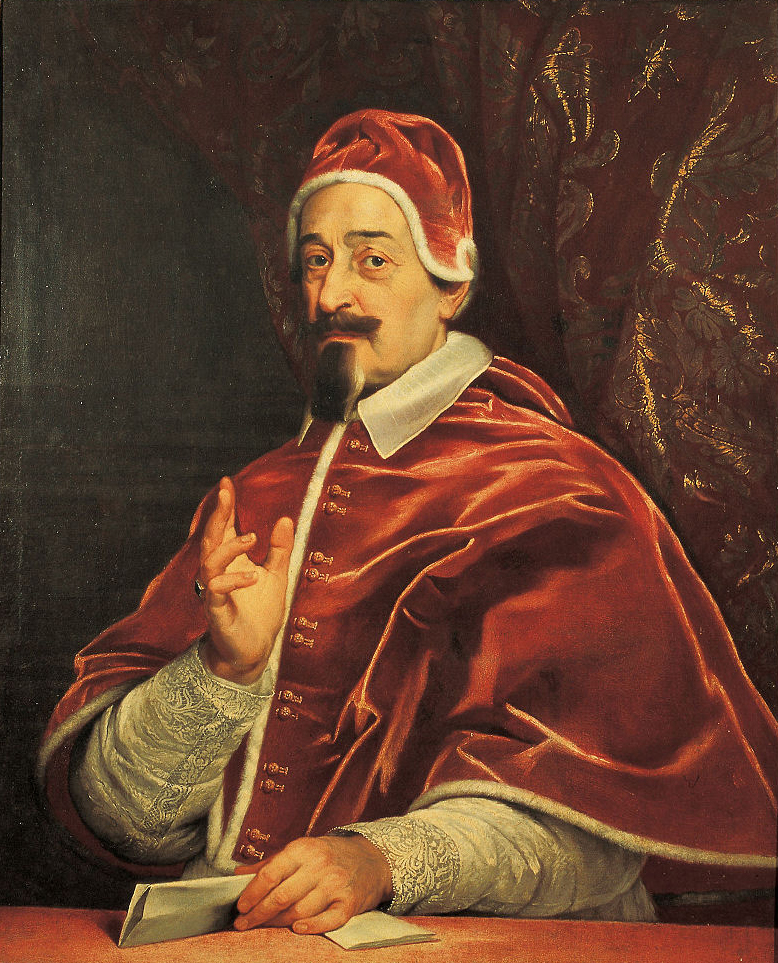

The 1655 conclave was convened following the death of Pope Innocent X and ended with the election of Cardinal Fabio Chigi as Alexander VII. The conclave quickly reached a deadlock, with Giulio Cesare Sacchetti receiving 33 votes throughout the conclave, but never securing enough for his own election. After several months of deliberation and negotiation, Chigi was elected Pope when Cardinal Mazarin, the leader of the French government, consented to Chigi's election at the request of Sacchetti.

The conclave was a notable event in the history of the Catholic Church, reflecting the political complexities of the time and resulting in a change of leadership.

== Background ==
Innocent X created Camillo Francesco Maria Pamphili, his only nephew, a cardinal. Camillo would later renounce his status as a cardinal in order to marry. Instead, Innocent's sister-in-law Olimpia Maidalchini handled all of the functions that would ordinarily have been the realm of a cardinal nephew.

During Innocent's papacy, the Peace of Westphalia brought an end to the Thirty Years' War, the most significant secular event that occurred during his reign. Innocent did not approve of the treaty because his representatives had not been a part of the discussions and he had not been consulted or asked to approve the recognition of the Protestant religion in Germany. He called upon secular Catholic leaders to renounce the peace, but they did not do so. Innocent in return refrained from appointing cardinals outside of Italy during his reign. He only created six non-Italian cardinals during his pontificate, and five of those were Crown-cardinals that Catholic monarchs insisted upon. Aside from these, the remainder of his 40 creations all came from Italy.

== Conclave ==
The College of Cardinals at the time of Innocent X's death had 69 members, and the papal conclave that followed saw 66 electors participate. Thirty-two of the cardinals had been created either by Urban VIII or Innocent X. Because Olimpia Maidalchini was not a cardinal, she was not allowed to participate in the conclave, even though she was the only woman to have been allowed to give a speech to the cardinals. This left Innocent's creations without a natural leader during the process. There were eighteen cardinals loyal to Spain in the conclave, and while the French had less loyalty, Urban VIII's nephew Francesco Barberini was a member of their faction. Barberini's allegiance to France was due to the marriage of one of his nieces to the brother of Rinaldo d'Este, the cardinal who led the French faction. Barberini had the capacity to bring up to 20 additional cardinals to support a candidate he favoured.

Giulio Cesare Sacchetti, who had been considered the most likely to become pope in 1644, was the strongest candidate again, but some cardinals did not vote for him because he had been vetoed in the previous conclave by the Spanish. Sacchetti also was the favoured candidate of Cardinal Mazarin, the leader of the French government at that time. During the initial scrutiny Sacchetti received 33 votes, a number he consistently received throughout the conclave. The early scrutinies also were unique because there were a large number of electors who wrote in no one, peaking at 27 votes on January 22. These votes came primarily from electors that had been created by Innocent X who did not want to vote for a cardinal who had been created by Urban VIII. Eleven of the votes for no candidate came from the Squadrone Volante, a group of cardinals who were willing to support a candidate for any faction that they thought would be beneficial to the office of the pope.

The stalemate continued through February, and younger members of the College of Cardinals began to play pranks on older members of the College in order to entertain themselves. This supposedly led to one older cardinal dying from pneumonia after a younger cardinal had caused him to fall and lie on a cold floor by startling him dressed as a ghost. There were also other illnesses amongst the cardinals that led several of them to leave the conclave.

== Election of Alexander VII ==
In mid-February, Sacchetti, recognizing that his own candidacy was lost, contacted Mazarin and requested that the French cardinals move their support to Fabio Chigi. Chigi was initially speculated as a candidate for pope before the death of Innocent X. Contemporary accounts reported that he was held to be the best suited for the position if the human considerations of the elector were not taken into account. Cardinal Mazarin of France was convinced to support Chigi by the Squadrone, even though he did not like him. Mazarin's hatred of Chigi dated to Mazarin's exile in Cologne during the Fronde while Chigi was serving as the papal nuncio in that city.

In April 1655, Mazarin wrote back to Sacchetti agreeing to allow electors loyal to France to vote for Chigi should Sacchetti's own election become impossible. Sacchetti then proceeded to ask his supporters to transfer their support to Chigi. On the first scrutiny on 7 April 1655, twenty written ballots were cast for Chigi, before the other electors acclaimed him pope after a conclave lasting eighty days. Upon his election, Chigi took the name Alexander VII.
