= Crown-cardinal =

Title conferred upon a particular Cardinal by a Catholic monarch

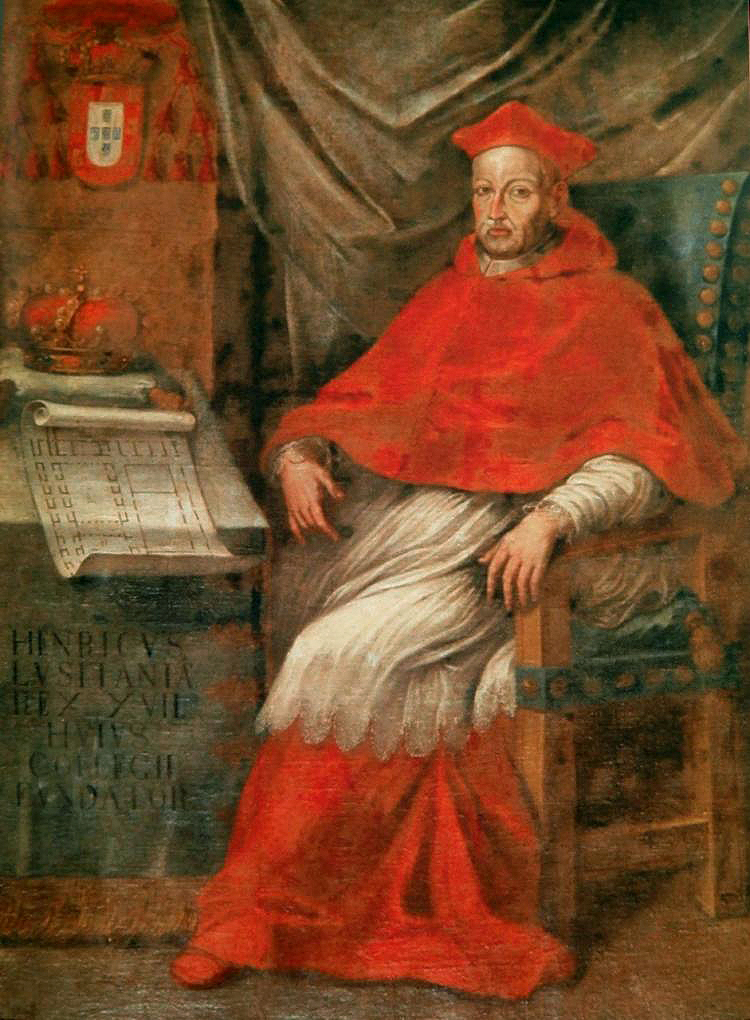
D. Henrique I of Portugal was both a cardinal and King of Portugal, the only such case of a cardinal-monarch.

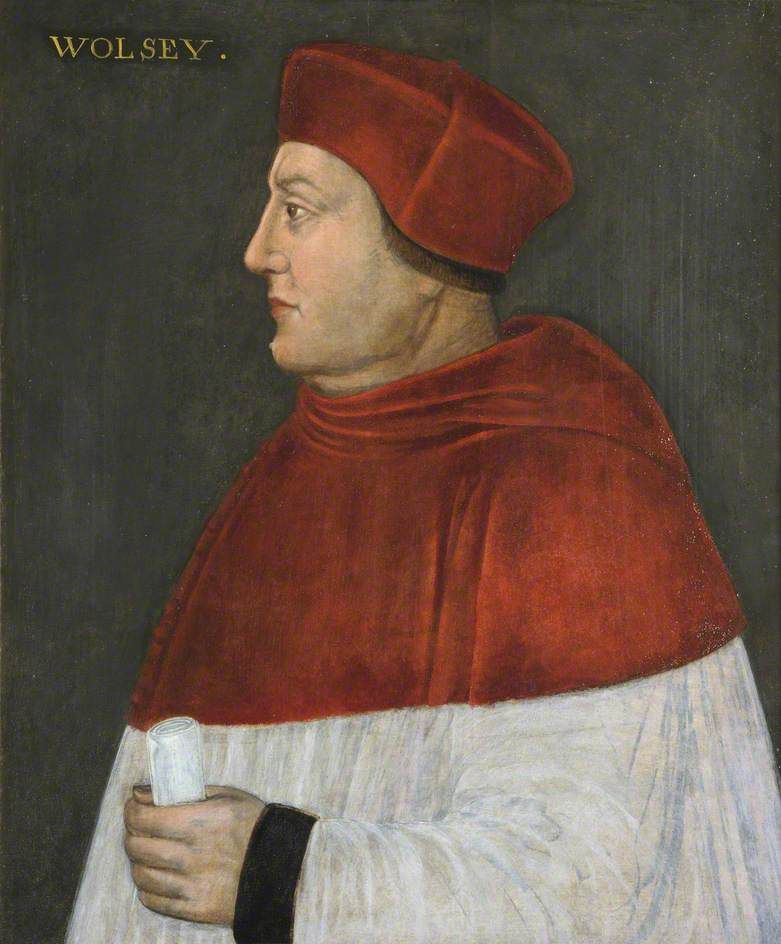
Cardinal Thomas Wolsey

A crown-cardinal (Italian: cardinale della corona) was a cardinal protector of a Catholic nation, nominated or funded by its monarch to serve as their representative within the College of Cardinals and, on occasion, to exercise the right claimed by some monarchs to veto a candidate for election to the papacy. More generally, the term may refer to any cardinal significant as a secular statesman or elevated at the request of a monarch.

Francis Burkle-Young defines a crown cardinal as one "elevated to the cardinalate solely on the recommendation of the European kings and in many cases without having performed any service at all for the advancement of the Church."

According to conclave historian Frederic Baumgartner, the crown-cardinals "rarely came to Rome except for the conclaves, if then, and they were largely unknown to the majority of the College. Usually unable to take part in the pratiche, they were not papabili and rarely received more than one or two votes". Crown-cardinals generally opposed the election of crown-cardinals from other kingdoms, although they tended to unite against the election of cardinal-nephews.

Opposition to national cardinal protectors arose in the fifteenth century due to the perceived conflict of interest, and Pope Martin V attempted to forbid them entirely in 1425. A reform of Pope Pius II dated 1464 regards national cardinal protectors as generally inconsistent with curial responsibility, with several exceptions. Such protectorships were first openly permitted by popes Innocent VIII and Alexander VI, both of whom required the explicit written consent of the pontiff for a cardinal to take up a "position of service to a secular prince". An unnamed cardinal even suggested elevating national cardinal protectors to a full and official position in the Roman Curia, equivalent to an ambassador.

== History ==
The institution of a cardinal protector of a nation-state may have originated in the 14th century, serving as a predecessor for the diplomatic institutions of the Holy See developed in the 16th century. The institution of the crown-cardinal first became a dominant one within the College of Cardinals with the consistory of Pope Eugene IV on December 18, 1439 (on the heels of the election of Antipope Felix V by the Council of Basel), which nominated an unprecedented number of cardinals with strong ties to European monarchs and other political institutions.

Monarch/Nation	Cardinal	Notes
Charles VII of France	Renaud de Chartres	Chancellor of France
Charles VII of France	Guillaume d'Estouteville	Royal cousin, constructor of Mont Saint-Michel
Henry VI of England	Louis de Luxembourg de Beaurevoir	Chancellor for France
Henry VI of England	John Kemp	former chancellor of England and archbishop of York
Afonso V of Portugal	António Martins de Chaves	Bishop of Porto
Kingdom of Hungary (interregnum)	Dénes Szécsi	Primate-designate of Hungary
Władysław III of Poland	Zbigniew Oleśnicki	Archbishop of Kraków
Holy Roman Empire (interregnum)	Petrus de Schaumburg	Imperial Counsellor
René I of Naples	Niccolo d'Acciapaccio	Archbishop of Capua
Milan	Gerardo Landriani Capitani	Bishop of Como
Genoa	Giorgio Fieschi di Lavagna	Archbishop of Genoa
Philip the Good	Jean Le Jeune	Ambassador to the Council of Ferrara-Florence

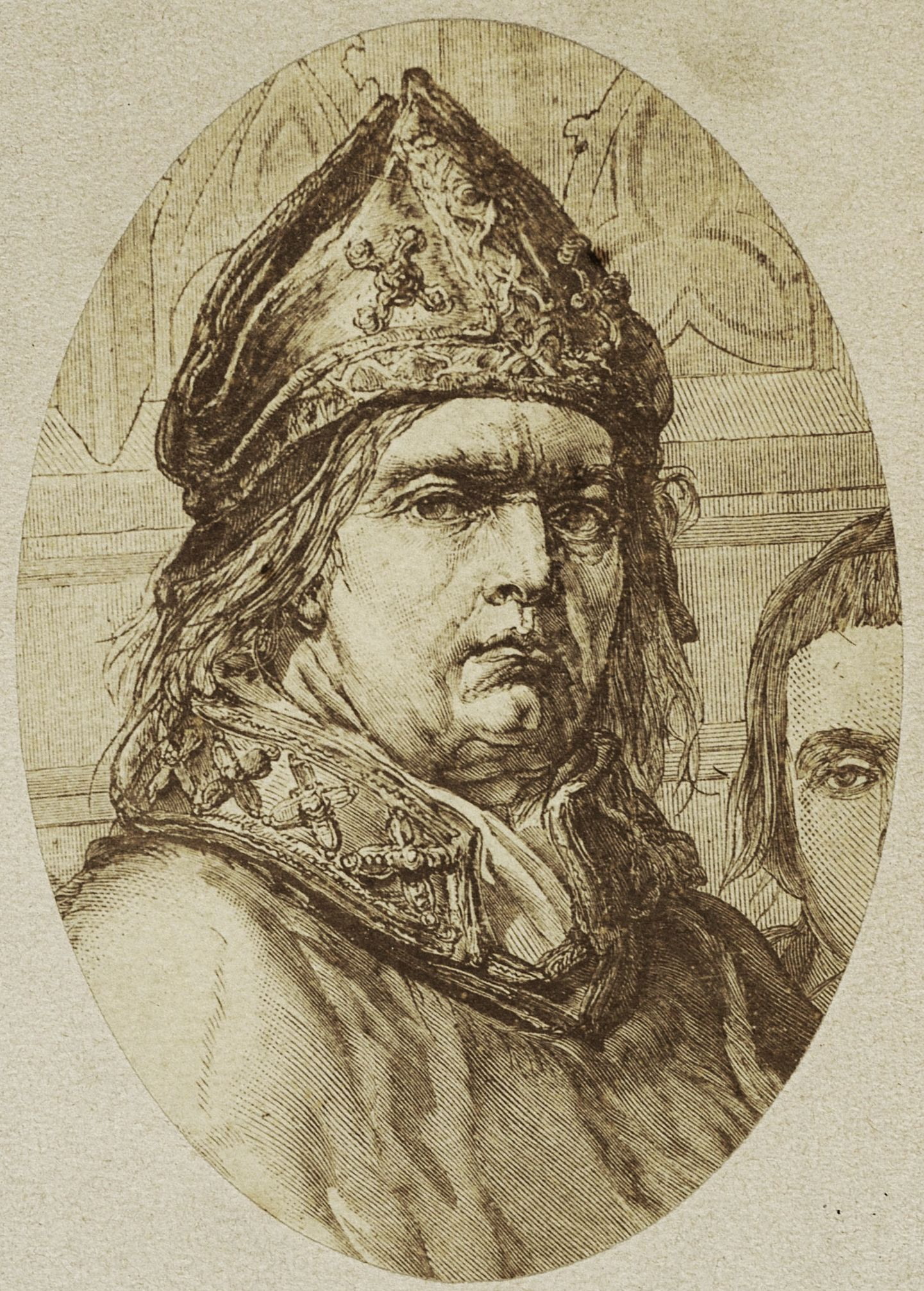
Zbigniew Oleśnicki, one of the first crown-cardinals

The first explicit reference to protectorship pertaining to a nation-state dates to 1425 (the Catholic Encyclopedia says 1424) when Pope Martin V forbade cardinals to "assume the protection of any king, prince or commune ruled by a tyrant or any other secular person whatsoever." This prohibition was renewed in 1492 by Pope Alexander VI. This prohibition was not renewed by Pope Leo X in the ninth session of the Lateran Council of 1512.

Some crown-cardinals were cardinal-nephews or members of powerful families; others were selected solely on the recommendation of European monarchs, in many cases with little previous ecclesiastical experience. During the reigns of Avignon Pope Clement VI and Pope Urban VI in particular, it was acknowledged that monarchs could select retainers and expect them to be elevated to the College of Cardinals. The going rate for the creation of a crown-cardinal was about 2,832 scudi.

Pope Alexander VII had to elevate crown-cardinals in pectore. Pope Urban VI (1378–1389) forbade crown-cardinals from receiving gifts from their respective sovereigns.

World War I cemented the decline of the institution of the crown cardinal, as many monarchies either became extinct or declined in power.

== Role in conclaves ==
In the case of Spain, France, and Austria, from the 16th to 20th centuries, crown-cardinals claimed the prerogative to exercise the jus exclusivae, that is, to veto a candidate for the papacy deemed "unacceptable" by their patron. Crown-cardinals usually arrived with a list of such candidates but often had to confer with their patrons during conclaves via messengers and attempt, with varying degrees of success, to delay the conclave from proceeding until they received a response. For example, Pope Innocent X (elected 1644) and Pope Innocent XIII (elected 1721) survived late-arriving veto instructions from France and Spain respectively. Austrian crown-cardinal Carlo Gaetano Gaisruck reached the papal conclave of 1846 too late to exercise the veto against Giovanni Maria Mastai-Ferretti, who had already been elected and taken the name Pius IX.

== List of cardinal protector crown-cardinals ==
The following includes a complete list of crown cardinal-protectors in the sixteenth and seventeenth centuries:

=== Of Hungary ===
- Pietro Isvalies (1507–1511)
- Giulio de Medici (?– 1523)

=== Of Austria ===
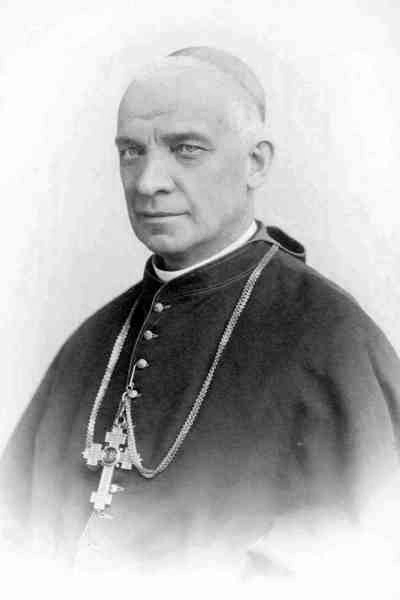
Jan Puzyna de Kosielsko, crown-cardinal of Austria, was the last to exercise the jus exclusivae.

Protectors:

- 1523–1531: Lorenzo Pucci
- 1532–1535: Giovanni Salviati
- 1540–1542: Girolamo Aleandro
- 1542–1555: Marcello Cervini
- 1555–1580: Giovanni Girolamo Morone
- 1580–1600: Andreas von Österreich
- 1603–1634: Franz von Dietrichstein
- 1635–1638: Ippolito Aldobrandini
- 1638–1642: Maurizio di Savoia
- 1655–1667: Ernst Adalbert von Harrach
  - Federico Sforza (1664–1666, substitute protector of Habsburg hereditary lands)
- 1673–1689: Carlo Pio di Savoia
- 1689–1701: Francesco Maria de' Medici
- 1701–1707: Leopold Karl von Kollonitsch
- 1707–1712: Johann Philipp von Lamberg
- 1712–1725: Christian von Sachsen-Zeitz
- 1726–1738: Wolfgang von Schrattenbach
- 1738–1751: Sigismund von Kollonitsch
- 1751–1758: Ferdinand Julius von Troyer
- 1779–1800: František Herczan
- 1823–1834: Giuseppe Albani
- 1858–1867: Pietro de Silvestri

Vice-protectors and co-protectors

- 1536–1541: Alessandro Cesarini
- 1560–1565: Cristoforo Madruzzo
- 1571–1571: Marco Antonio Colonna
- 1574/ 1580/81: Tolomeo Galli
- 1581–1603: Alfonso Gesualdo
- 1584–1587: Antonio Carafa
- 1604–1607: Alfonso Visconti
- 1607–1611: Ottavio Paravicini
- 1612–1621: Pietro Aldobrandini
- 1621–1632: Ludovico Ludovisi
- 1629–1631: Cosimo de Torres
- 1635–1641: Carlo Emanuele di Savoia
- 1642–1644: Alfonso de la Cueva
- 1644–1655: Ernst von Harrach
- 1645–1664: Girolamo Colonna
- 1664–1667: Federico Sforza
- 1667–1675: Friedrich von Hessen-Darmstadt
- 1690–1693: José Saenz d'Aguirre
- 1694–1700: Francesco del Giudice
- 1701/02/ 1706–1710: Vincenzo Grimani
- 1703–05/ 1708–12: Fabrizio Paolucci
- 1713–1719: Wolfgang von Schrattenbach
- 1719–1722: Michael Friedrich von Althan
- 1722–1726: Juan Álvaro Cienfuegos Villazón
- 1735–1743: Niccolò del Giudice
- 1743–1779: Alessandro Albani

=== Of Ireland ===
- Girolamo Ghinucci (1539–1541)
- Rodolfo Pio di Carpi (1545–1554)
- Giovanni Girolamo Morone (1555? – 1574?)
- Francesco Alciati (1574–1580)
- Flavio Orsini (1580–1581)
- Nicholas Pelleve (1582–1594)
- Girolamo Mattei (1594? – 1603)
- Pompeo Arrigoni (1605–1616)
- Fabrizio Verallo (1616? – 1624)
- Ludovico Ludovisi (1625–1632)
- Antonio Barberini (1633? – 1671)
- Paluzzo Paluzzi Altieri degli Albertoni (1671–1698)
- Giuseppe Renato Imperiali (1706–1737)
- Neri Maria Corsini (1737–1770)
- Mario Marefoschi (1771–1780)
- Gregorio Salviati (1781–1794)
- Carlo Livizzani Forni (1794–1802)

=== Of France ===
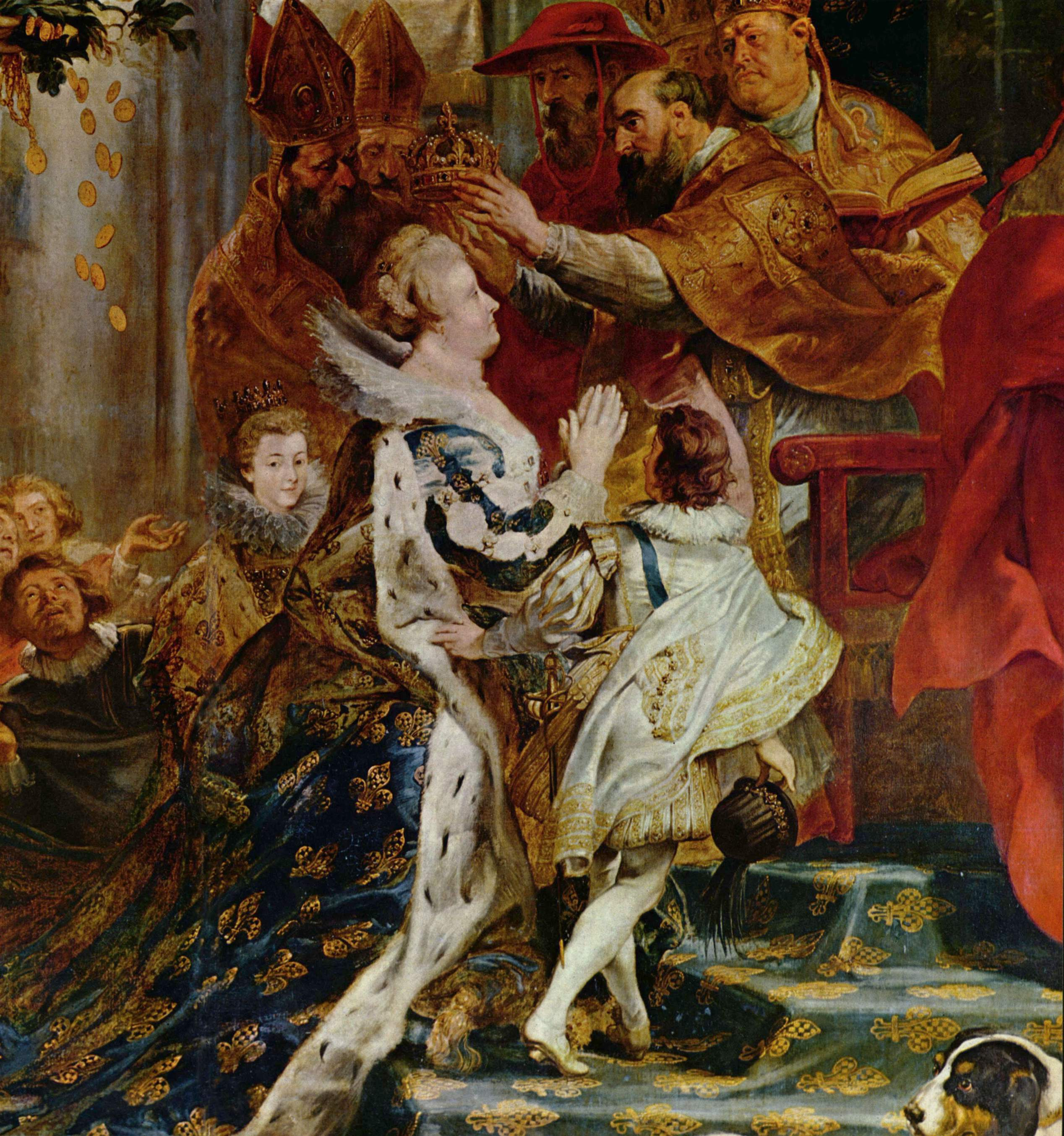
François de Joyeuse, cardinal protector of France, anointing Queen Dowager Marie de Medici in 1610

The King of France historically had only one cardinal protector at a time, chosen by a complicated process that involved the King, the secretary of state for foreign affairs, the French ambassador to Rome, and other French power brokers, but not the Pope. The crown-cardinal of France was also abbot in commendam of several French abbeys.

There was traditionally at least one resident French cardinal in the Roman Curia during the first half of the sixteenth century, but Louis XII and Francis I chose three successive Italian cardinals as protector of France thereafter.

- 1513–1516: Federico di Sanseverino
- 1516–1523: Giulio de Medici
- 1523–1548: Agostino Trivulzio
  - Niccolò Gaddi (vice-protector from 1533)
- 1549–1572: Ippolito II d'Este
- 1573–1586: Luigi d'Este
- 1587–1615: François de Joyeuse
  - Vice-protector Arnaud d'Ossat (1599–1604)
  - Vice-protector François de La Rochefoucald (October 1609–May 1611)
- 1616–1620: Alessandro Orsini
  - Guido Bentivoglio (vice-protector from 1621 until 1636)
- 1621–1636: Maurizio di Savoia
- 1636–1644: Antonio Barberini
- 1645–1672: Rinaldo d'Este
  - Alessandro Bichi (vice-protector 1645 until 1657)
- 1672–1676: Virginio Orsini (from 1646 acted as co-protector)
- 1676–1701: César d'Estrées
- 1702–1709: Francesco Maria de’Medici
- 1709–1740: Pietro Ottoboni
  - Pierre Guérin de Tencin, acting protector until 1758
- 1758–1765: Prospero Colonna di Sciarra
- 1769–1792/4: François-Joachim de Pierre de Bernis

=== Of the Holy Roman Empire ===
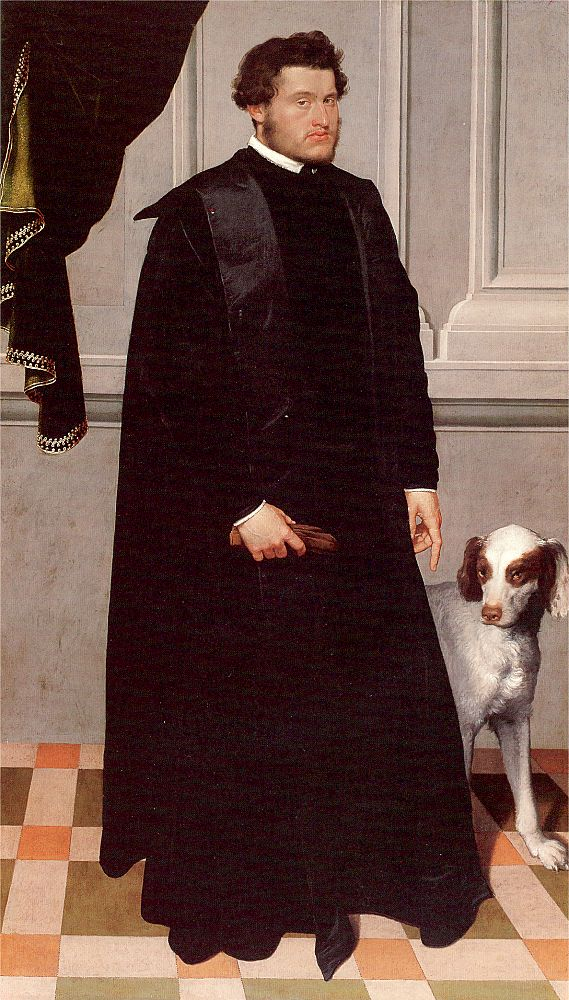
Ludovico Madruzzo, crown-cardinal of the Holy Roman Empire

The protector of the Holy Roman Empire was often the protector of the Austrian hereditary lands.

- 1492–1503: Francesco Piccolomini
- 1518–1539: Lorenzo Campeggio
- 1540–1540: Pedro Fernández Manrique
- 1540–1542: Girolamo Aleander
- 1542–1550: Innocenzo Cibo
- 1550–1557: Juan Álvarez de Toledo
- 1557–1573: Otto Truchsess von Waldburg
- 1573–1600: Ludovico Madruzzo
- 1603–1611: Ottavio Paravicini
- 1611–1633: Scipione Borghese
- 1635/36: Franz von Dietrichstein
- 1636–1642: Moritz von Savoyen
- 1644–1666: Girolamo Colonna
- 1666–1682: Friedrich von Hessen-Darmstadt
- 1682–1689: Carlo Pio di Savoia
- 1689–1701: Francesco Maria de' Medici
- 1701–1707: Leopold von Kollonitsch
- 1707–1712: Johann Philipp von Lamberg
- 1712–1725: Christian August von Sachsen-Zeitz
- 1726–1738: Wolfgang von Schrattenbach
- 1738–1751: Sigismund von Kollonitsch
- 1751–1758: Ferdinand Julius von Troyer
- 1758–1765: vacant
- 1765–1779: Alessandro Albani
- 1779–1800: Franziskus Herzan von Harras

Vice-protectors and co-protectors

- 1517–1530: Lorenzo Pucci
- 1530–1532: Wilhelm van Enkevoirt
- 1534–1539: Alessandro Cesarini
- 1538–1540: Girolamo Ghinucci
- 1540–1542: Alessandro Farnese
- 1542–1550: Juan Álvarez de Toledo
- 1550–1553: Bernardino Maffei
- 1557–1559: Pedro Pacheco de Villena
- 1558–1568: Clemente Dolera
- 1587–1593: Filippo Spinola
- 1594–1600: Ottavio Paravicini
- 1621–1625: Eitel Friedrich von Hohenzollern
- 1625–1644: Giulio Savelli
- 1644: Girolamo Colonna
  - 1664–1666: Federico Sforza (substitute protector)
- 1666–1682: Carlo Pio di Savoia
- 1690–1693: José Saenz d'Aguirre
- 1694–1700: Francesco del Giudice
- 1701/02/ 1706–1710: Vincenzo Grimani
- 1703–05/ 1708–12: Fabrizio Paolucci
- 1713–1719: Wolfgang von Schrattenbach
- 1719–1722: Michael Friedrich von Althan
- 1722–1726: Juan Álvaro Cienfuegos Villazón
- 1735–1743: Niccolò del Giudice
- 1745–1765: Alessandro Albani

=== Of Poland ===
- Pedro Isvalies (ca. 1506 — 1511)
- Achille Grassi (1512–1523)
- Lorenzo Pucci (1523–1531)
- Antonio Pucci (1532–1544)
- Alessandro Farnese (1544–1589)
  - Bernardino Maffei (vice-protector 1550–1553)
  - Giacomo Puteo (vice-protector 1555–1563)
  - Giacomo Savelli (vice-protector 1563–1587)
- Alessandro Peretti di Montalto (1589–1623)
- Cosimo de Torres (vice-protector 1622–1623, protector 1623–1642)
- Giulio Savelli (1642–1644)
  - Gianbattista Pamphilj (vice-protector until 1644)
- Gaspare Mattei (1644–1650)
- Virginio Orsini (co-protector 1647–1650, protector 1650–1676)
- Pietro Vidoni (co-protector 1676, protector 1676–1681)
- Carlo Barberini (1681–1704)
- Annibale Albani (1712–1751)
- Gian Francesco Albani (1751–1795)

=== Of Sweden ===
Cardinal-protectors of Sweden were appointed by king of Poland Zygmunt III Waza, who had claimed the rights to the Swedish Crown.

- Odoardo Farnese (1601–1626)
- Lorenzo Magalotti (1626–1637)

=== Of Portugal ===
- 1517–1531: Lorenzo Pucci
- 1533–1544: Antonio Pucci
- 1545–1564: Guido Ascanio Sforza
- 1565–1572: Carlo Borromeo
- 1573–1589: Alessandro Farnese
- 1591–1603: Alfonso Gesualdo
- 1604–1626: Odoardo Farnese
- 1626–1634: Francesco Barberini
- 1635–1638: Ippolito Aldobrandini
- 1657–1676: Virginio Orsini
- 1676–1714: César d'Estrées
- 1714–1721: Michelangelo Conti
- 1739–1770: Neri Maria Corsini
- 1859–1884: Camillo di Pietro
- 1887–1888: Włodzimierz Czacki
- 1891–1910/30: Vincenzo Vannutelli

=== Of Savoy/Kingdom of Sardinia ===
Protectors of the Duchy of Savoy

- 1534–1537: Paolo Emilio Cesi
- 1576–1594: Michele Bonelli
- 1594–1621: Pietro Aldobrandini
- 1621–1632: Ludovico Ludovisi
- 1633–1671: Antonio Barberini
- 1671–1704: Carlo Barberini

Protectors of the Kingdom of Sardinia

- 1727–1779: Alessandro Albani
- 1819? – 1834: Giuseppe Albani
- 1835–1853: Luigi Lambruschini

=== Of Naples ===
- 1530–1542: Alessandro Cesarini
- 1544–1549: Alessandro Farnese
- 1556–1564: Guido Ascanio Sforza
- 1566–1574: Alessandro Sforza
- 1574–1603: Alfonso Gesualdo
- 1605–1608: Ascanio Colonna
- 1608–1642: Girolamo Doria
- 1644–1650: Gaspare Mattei
- 1657–1663: Camillo Astalli
- 1664–1676: Federico Sforza
- 1689–1699: José Saenz d'Aguirre

=== Of Sicily ===
- 1524–1542: Alessandro Cesarini
- 1542–1589: Alessandro Farnese
- 1592–1626: Odoardo Farnese
- 1626–1634: Francesco Barberini
- 1635–1642: Luigi Caetani
- 1645–1656: Pier Donato Cesi
- 1664–1687: Lorenzo Raggi
  - Federico Sforza (1664–1666, substitute protector)
- 1687–1699: José Saenz d'Aguirre
- 1699–1725: Francesco del Giudice

=== Of the Kingdom of Two Sicilies ===
- 1738–1747: Troiano Acquaviva d'Aragona
- 1747–1789: Domenico Orsini d'Aragona
- 1789–1795: Ferdinando Spinelli
- 1799–1806?: Fabrizio Dionigi Ruffo

=== Of Castile/Spain ===
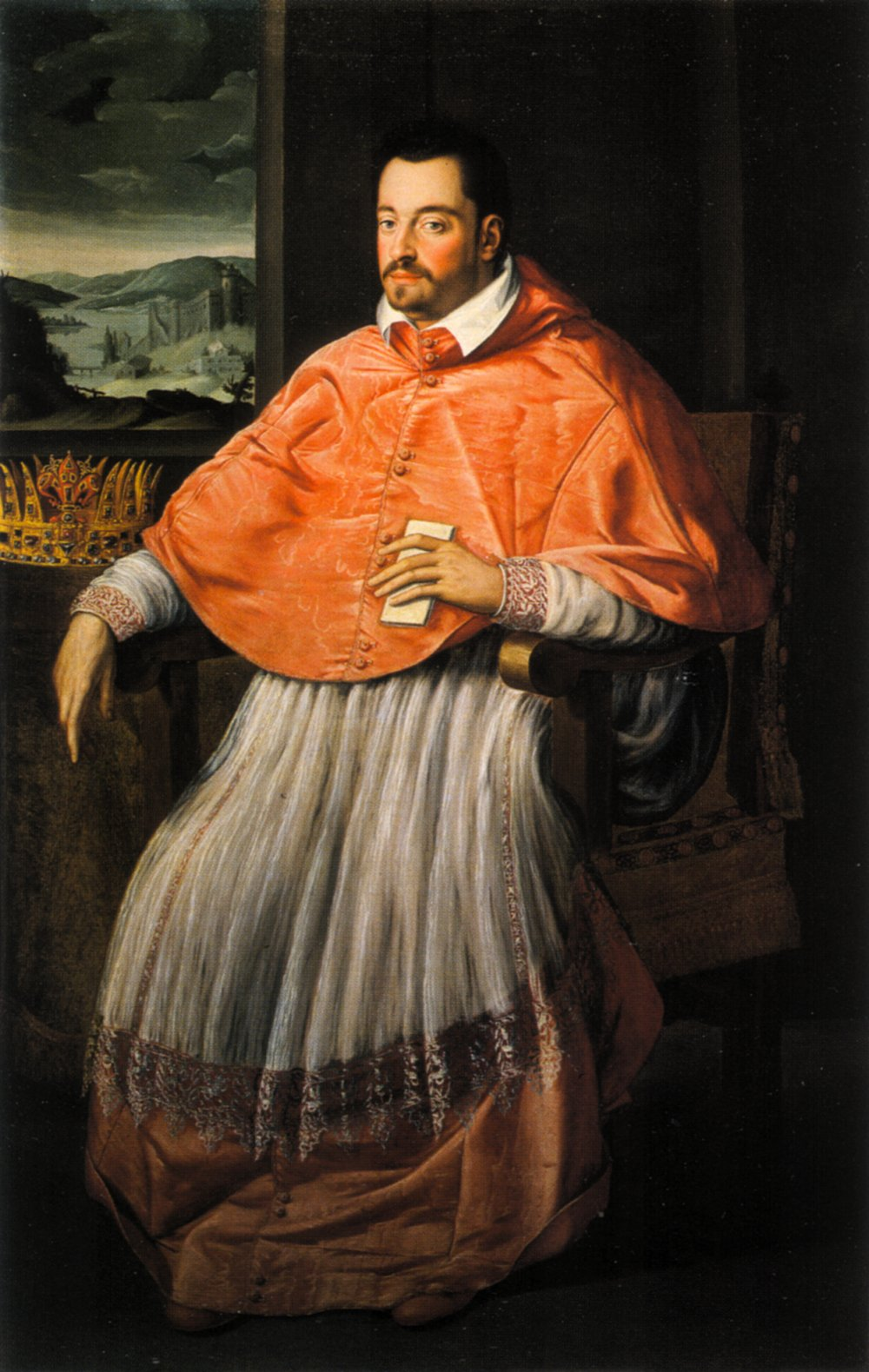
Ferdinando de' Medici, crown-cardinal of Spain from 1582 to 1584

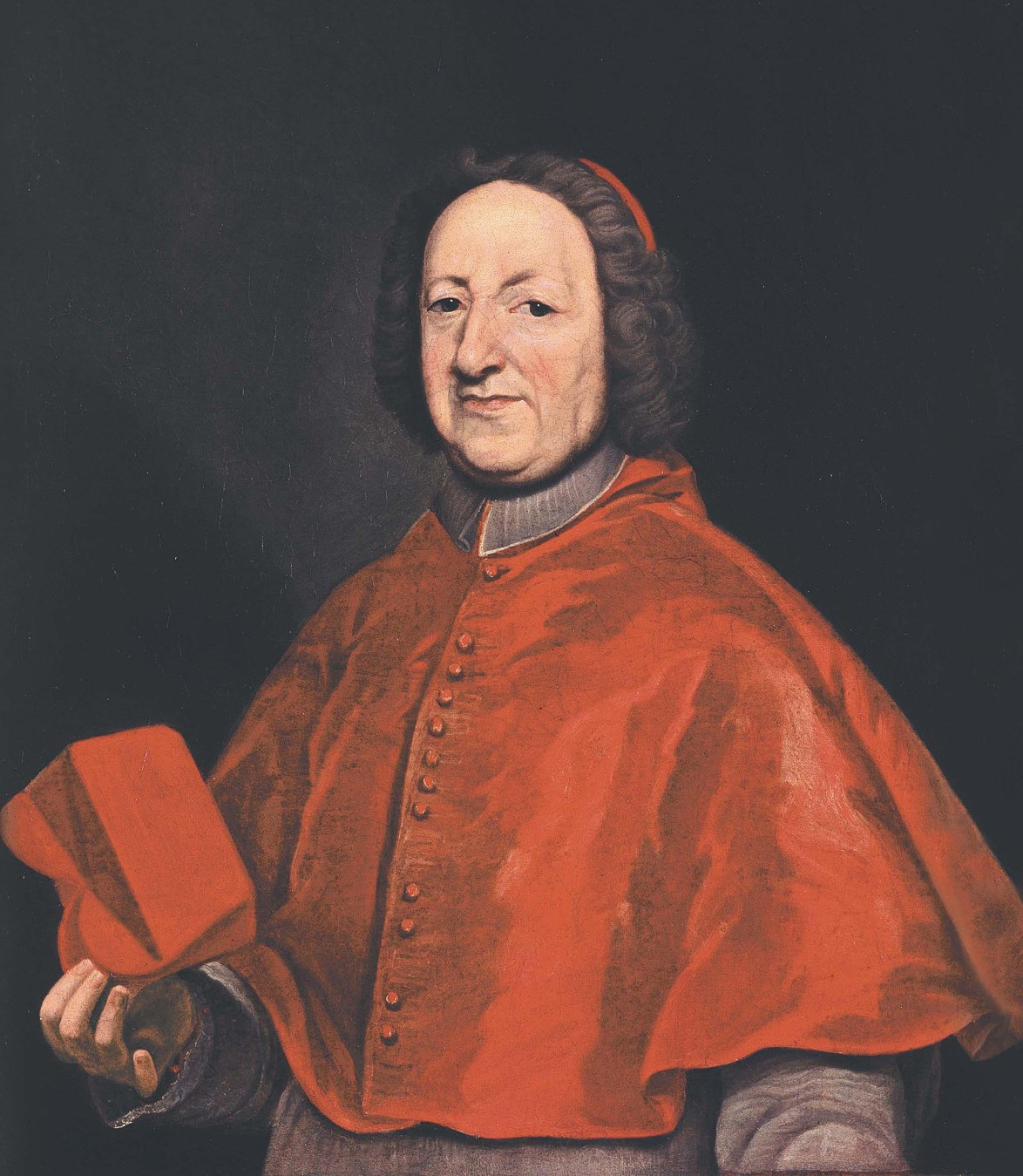
Giulio Alberoni

The King of Spain could have as many as five or six cardinal protectors (Spanish: Protector de España) simultaneously, although traditionally the protector of Castile was the most frequently turned to.

- 1516–1517: Francisco de Remolins
- 1517–1529: Lorenzo Pucci
- 1529–1534: Andrea della Valle
- 1534–1563: Ercole Gonzaga
- 1563–1566: Francesco Gonzaga
- 1566–1574: Francisco Pacheco de Toledo
- 1574–1581: Alessandro Sforza
- 1582–1588: Ferdinando de' Medici
  - Francesco Alciati (Vice-protector circa 1569)
- 1588–1592: Juan Hurtado de Mendoza
- 1592–1599: Pedro de Deza Manuel
- 1599–1601: Alessandro d'Este
- 1601–1606: Francisco de Ávila
- 1606–1617: Antonio Zapata y Cisneros
- 1617–1632: Gaspar de Borja y Velasco
- 1632–1645: Gil Carrillo de Albornoz
- 1645–1666: Carlo de' Medici
  - Federico Sforza (1664–1667, substitute protector)
- 1667–1672: Friedrich von Hessen-Darmstadt
- 1673–1677: Luis Manuel Fernández de Portocarrero
- 1677–1689: Carlo Pio di Savoia
- 1689–1702: Francesco Maria de' Medici
- 1702–1713?: Francesco del Giudice
- 1713–1725: Francesco Acquaviva d'Aragona
- 1725–1743: Luis Antonio Belluga y Moncada
- 1743–1747: Troiano Acquaviva d'Aragona
- 1748–1760: Joaquín Fernández de Portocarrero

=== Of Aragon ===
- 1517–1531: Lorenzo Pucci
- 1531–1542: Alessandro Cesarini
- 1542–1589: Alessandro Farnese
- 1592–1626: Odoardo Farnese
- 1626–1634: Francesco Barberini
- 1635–1641: Carlo Emanuele Pio di Savoia
- 1645–1666: Girolamo Colonna
- 1666–1682: Friedrich von Hessen-Darmstadt
- 1682–1689: Carlo Pio di Savoia
- 1689–1702: Francesco Maria de' Medici

=== Of Flanders ===
- 1561–1572: Carlo Borromeo
- 1573–1597: Marcantonio Colonna
- 1597–1608: Ascanio Colonna
- 1608–1633: Scipione Caffarelli-Borghese
- 1633–1642: Pietro Maria Borghese
- 1644–1666: Girolamo Colonna
  - Federico Sforza (1664–1666, substitute protector)
- 1669–1676: Friedrich von Hessen-Darmstadt
- 1677–1689: Carlo Pio di Savoia
- 1689–1702: Francesco Maria de' Medici

== List of other national cardinal protectors ==
=== Of Switzerland ===
- Carlo Borromeo (1560–1572)
- Paolo Emilio Sfondrati (1591–1618)
- Odoardo Farnese (1618–1626)
- Francesco Barberini (1626–1679)
- Carlo Barberini (1680–1704)
- Fabrizio Spada (1712–1717)
- Annibale Albani (1717–1751)

=== Of Republic of Genoa ===
- Giandomenico Spinola (1626–1630)
- Laudivio Zacchia (1631–1637)
- Pietro Maria Borghese (1638–1642)

== List of non-cardinal protector crown-cardinals ==
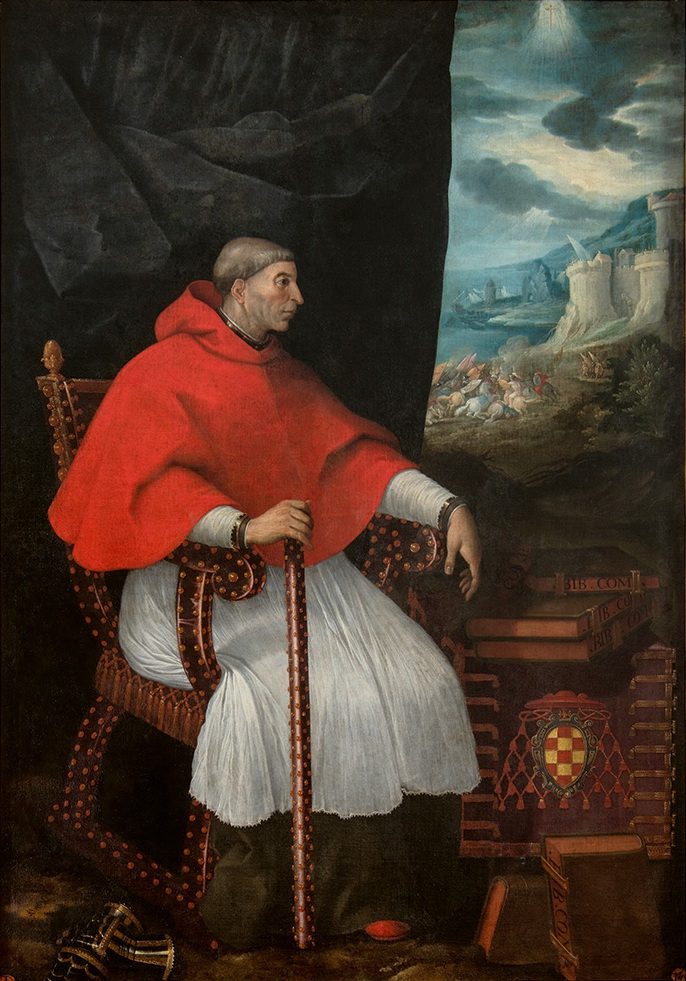
Francisco Jiménez de Cisneros

Of Austria

- Andrew of Austria, son of Archduke Ferdinand
- Joseph Dominicus von Lamberg (December 20, 1737 – August 30, 1761)
- Rudolf of Austria (June 4, 1819 – July 24, 1831), Archbishop of Olomouc, Archduke
- Carlo Gaetano Gaisruck (Papal conclave circa 1846)
- Jan Maurycy Pawel Puzyna de Kosielsko (Papal conclave circa 1903)

Of Bavaria

- Philipp Wilhelm of Bavaria (22 September 1576 – 18 May 1598), Bishop of Regensburg from 1595, Cardinal from 1597
- Johann Casimir Häffelin (6 April 1818 – 27 August 1827), Ambassador of Bavaria to the Holy See (since 18 November 1803), probably a de facto court bishop since 11 November 1787 (as general vicar of the Bavarian Priory of the Order of Malta)

Of England

- Charles of Guise, uncle of Mary, Queen of Scots

Of France

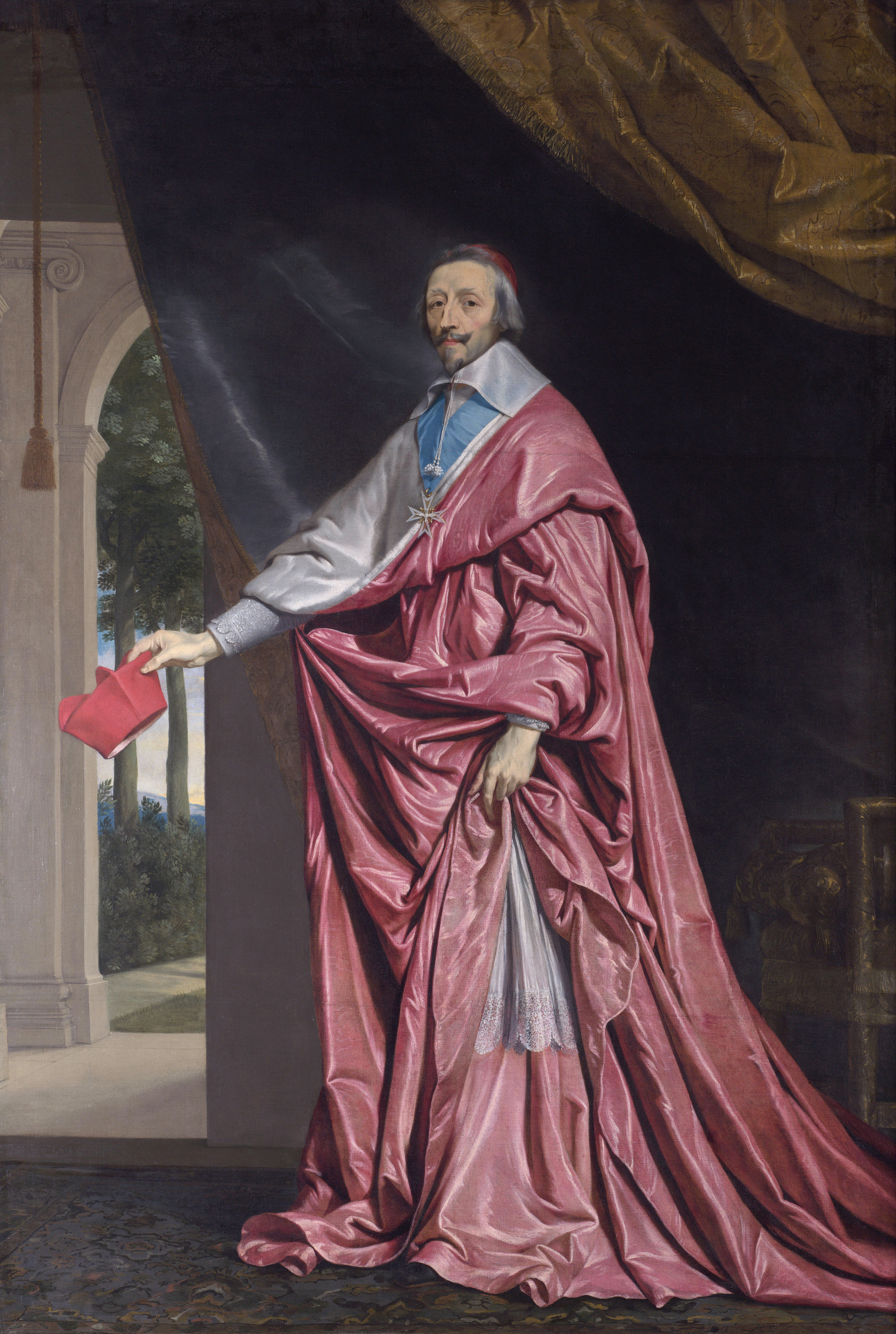
Armand Jean du Plessis, Cardinal Richelieu

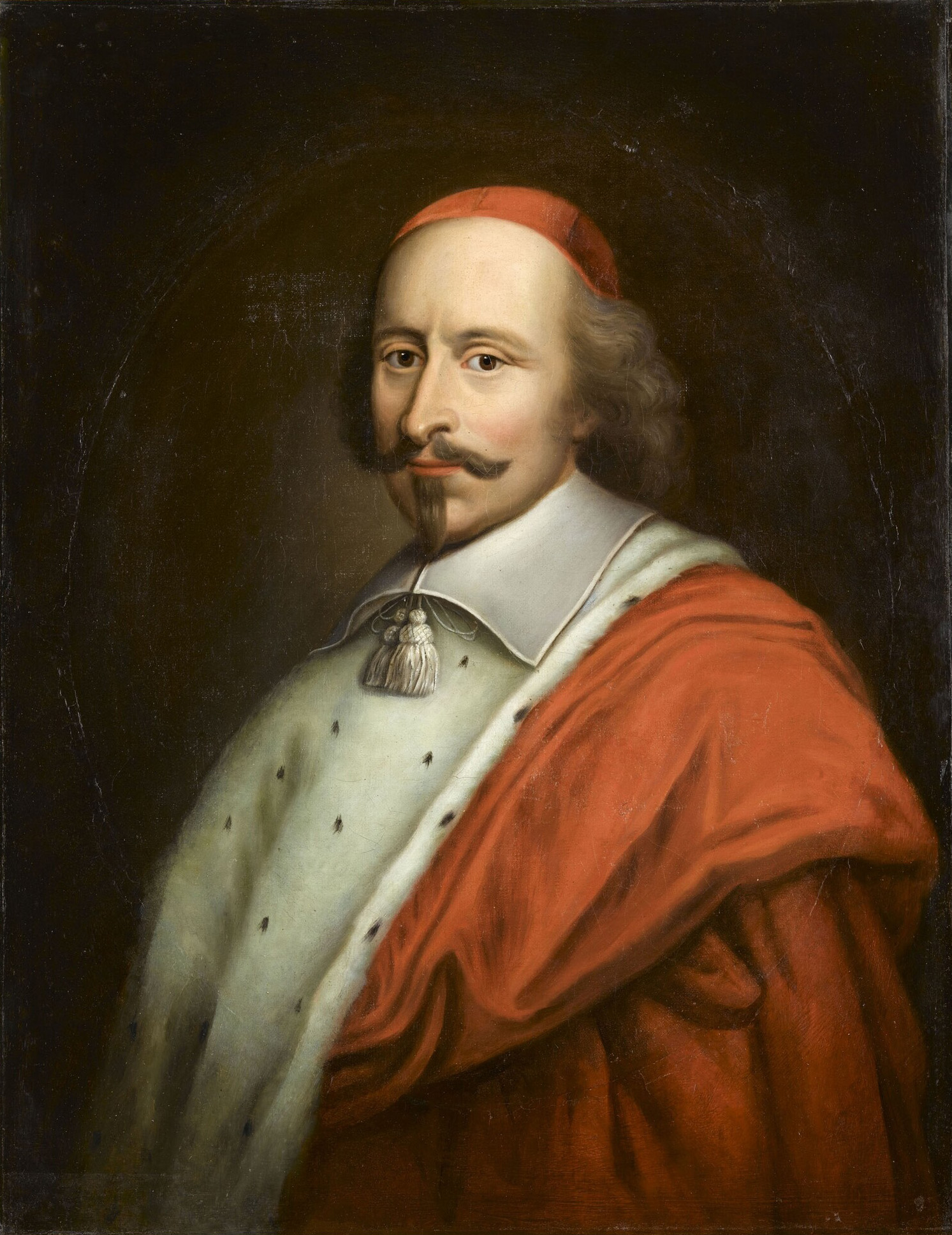
Cardinal Mazarin

- Jean Jouffroy, continued role as procurator after elevation as cardinal
- Jean Balue, continued role as procurator after elevation as cardinal; styled as "French protector" in Rome
- André d'Espinay (March 9, 1489 – November 10, 1500)
- Armand Jean de Richelieu (November 3, 1622 – December 4, 1642), Bishop of Luçon, Prime Minister
- Jules Mazarin (1641–1661)
- Jean Siffrein Maury (1794–1806), Archbishop of Montefiascone, representative of the Bourbon pretender, sided with Napoleon I in 1806
- Joseph Fesch (2 December 1804 – 22 June 1815), Archbishop of Lyons, step-uncle to Napoleon I, Ambassador of France to the Holy See (1803–1806, but in 1803 there wasn't as yet a crown) and Imperial Grand Almoner (1805–1814); his role as crown-cardinal ended with the end of the Napoleonic reign, whereas he remained Cardinal and Archbishop

Of the Holy Roman Empire

- Albert of Austria, son of Maximilian II, Holy Roman Emperor

Of Poland

- Jerzy Radziwiłł (1556–1600)
- Jan Aleksander Lipski (December 20, 1737 – February 20, 1746)

Of Portugal

- Cardinal-Infante Afonso of Portugal
- Henry of Portugal
- Tomás de Almeida (December 20, 1737 – February 27, 1754)

Of Spain

- Pedro González de Mendoza (May 7, 1473 – January 11, 1495)
- Francisco Jiménez de Cisneros
- Cardinal-Infante Ferdinand
- Luis Antonio Jaime de Borbón y Farnesio (December 19, 1735 – December 18, 1754)
- Francisco de Solís Folch de Cardona (April 5, 1756 – March 21, 1775)

Of Tuscany

- Ferdinando I de' Medici, Grand Duke of Tuscany

== See also ==
- Prince of the Church
- Prince-Bishop
- Lord Bishop
- Cardinal-nephew
- Lay cardinal
