= Cardinals created by Innocent X =

Catholic appointments from 1644 to 1654

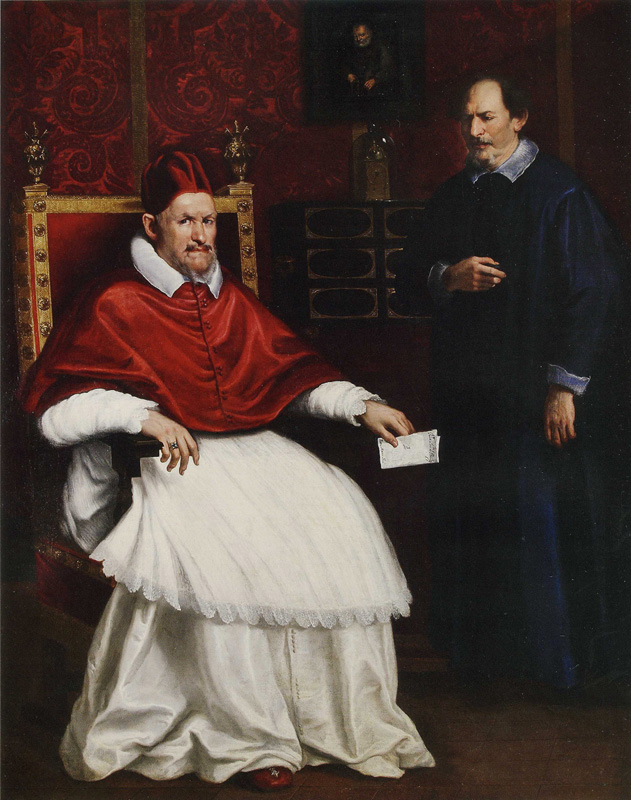
Pope Innocent X (1574–1655) and a secretary.

Pope Innocent X (r. 1644–1655) created 40 cardinals in 8 consistories:

== 14 November 1644 ==
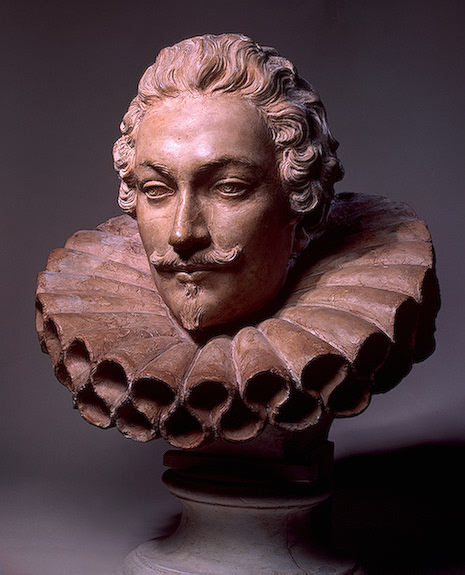
Camillo Francesco Maria Pamphili (1622–66), made a cardinal on November 14, 1644.

- Camillo Francesco Maria Pamphilj, nephew of the Pope – cardinal-deacon of S. Maria in Domnica (received the title on 12 December 1644); resigned the cardinalate on 21 January 1647 to marry Olimpia Aldobrandini, † 26 July 1666
- Giancarlo de' Medici, brother of Ferdinando II de' Medici, Grand Duke of Tuscany– cardinal-deacon of S. Maria Nuova (received the title on 20 March 1645), then cardinal-deacon of S. Giorgio in Velabro (6 March 1656), † 23 January 1663
- Domenico Cecchini, papal Datary (created in pectore, published on 6 March 1645) – cardinal-priest of S. Sisto (received the title on 24 April 1645), † 1 May 1656
- Francesco Maria Farnese,(created in pectore, published on 4 December 1645) brother of the duke of Parma and Piacenza Odoardo I Farnese – cardinal-deacon never given a title, † 12 July 1647

== 6 March 1645 ==
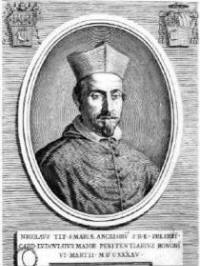
Niccolò Albergati-Ludovisi (1608–87), made a cardinal on March 6, 1645.

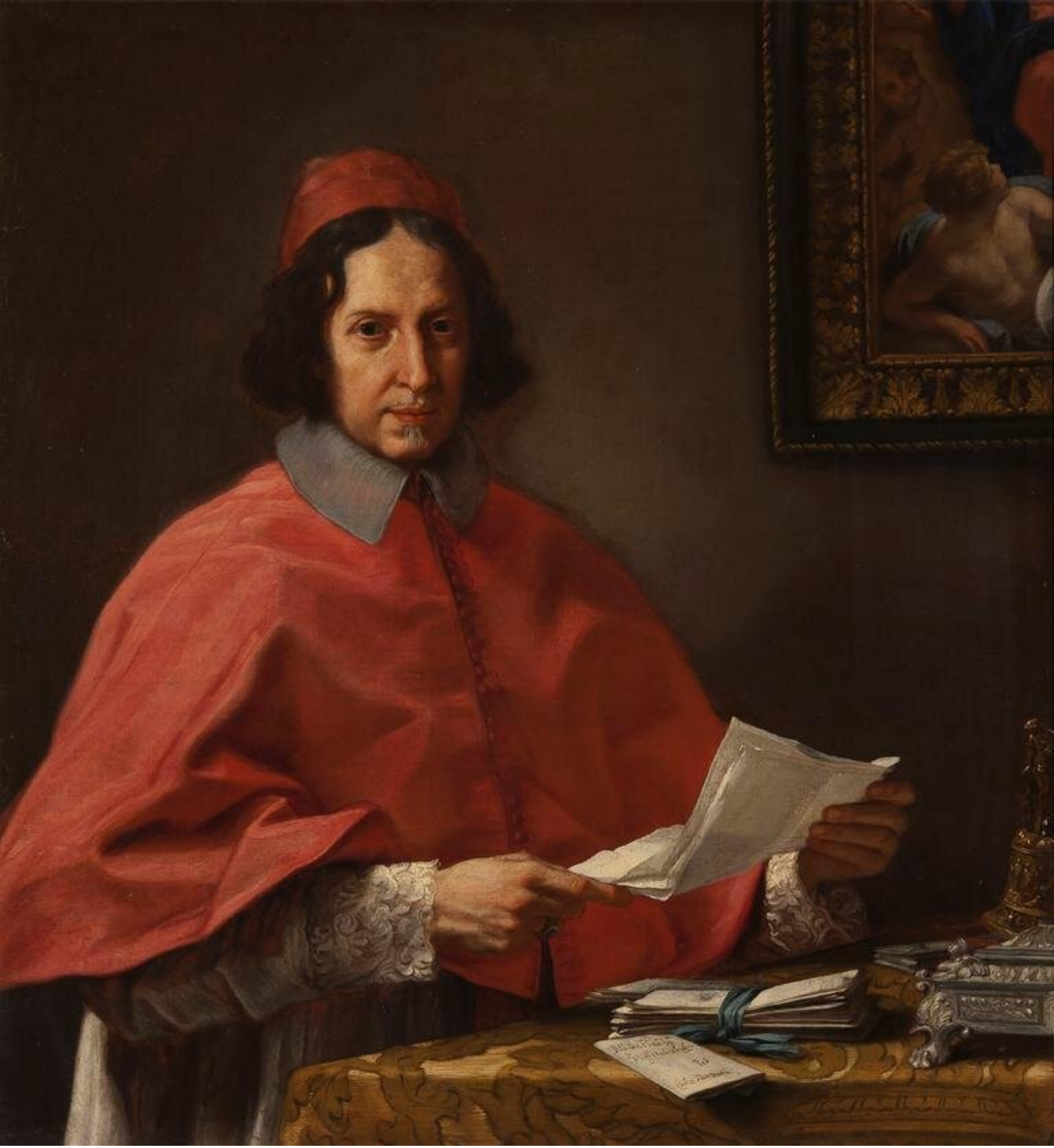
Alderano Cybo (1613–1700), made a cardinal on March 6, 1645.

- Niccolò Albergati-Ludovisi, archbishop of Bologna – cardinal-priest of S. Agostino (received the title on 24 April 1645), then cardinal-priest of S. Maria degli Angeli (25 June 1645), cardinal-priest of S. Maria in Trastevere (11 October 1666), cardinal-priest of S. Lorenzo in Lucina (19 October 1676), cardinal-bishop of Sabina (13 September 1677), cardinal-bishop of Porto e S. Rufina (1 December 1681), cardinal-bishop of Ostia e Velletri (15 February 1683), † 9 August 1687
- Pier Luigi Carafa, bishop of Tricarico – cardinal-priest of SS. Silvestro e Martino (received the title on 10 July 1645), † 15 February 1655
- Tiberio Cenci, bishop of Jesi – cardinal-priest of S. Callisto (received the title on 24 April 1645), † 26 February 1653
- Orazio Giustiniani, C.O., bishop of Nocera – cardinal-priest of S. Onofrio (received the title on 24 April 1645), † 25 July 1649
- Federico Sforza, protonotary apostolic – cardinal-deacon of SS. Vito e Modesto (received the title on 10 July 1645), then cardinal-priest of SS. Silvestro e Martino (26 June 1656), cardinal-priest of S. Anastasia (21 April 1659), cardinal-priest of S. Pietro in Vincoli (21 November 1661), † 24 May 1676
- Benedetto Odescalchi – cardinal-deacon of SS. Cosma e Damiano (received the title on 24 April 1645), then cardinal-priest of S. Onofrio (21 April 1659), on 21 September 1676 became Pope Innocent XI, † 12 August 1689
- Alderano Cybo – cardinal-priest of S. Pudenziana (received the title on 24 April 1645), then cardinal-priest of S. Prassede (30 January 1668), cardinal-priest of S. Lorenzo in Lucina (13 September 1677), cardinal-bishop of Palestrina (6 February 1679), cardinal-bishop of Porto e S. Rufina (15 February 1683), cardinal-bishop of Ostia e Velletri (10 November 1687), † 22 July 1700

== 28 May 1646 ==
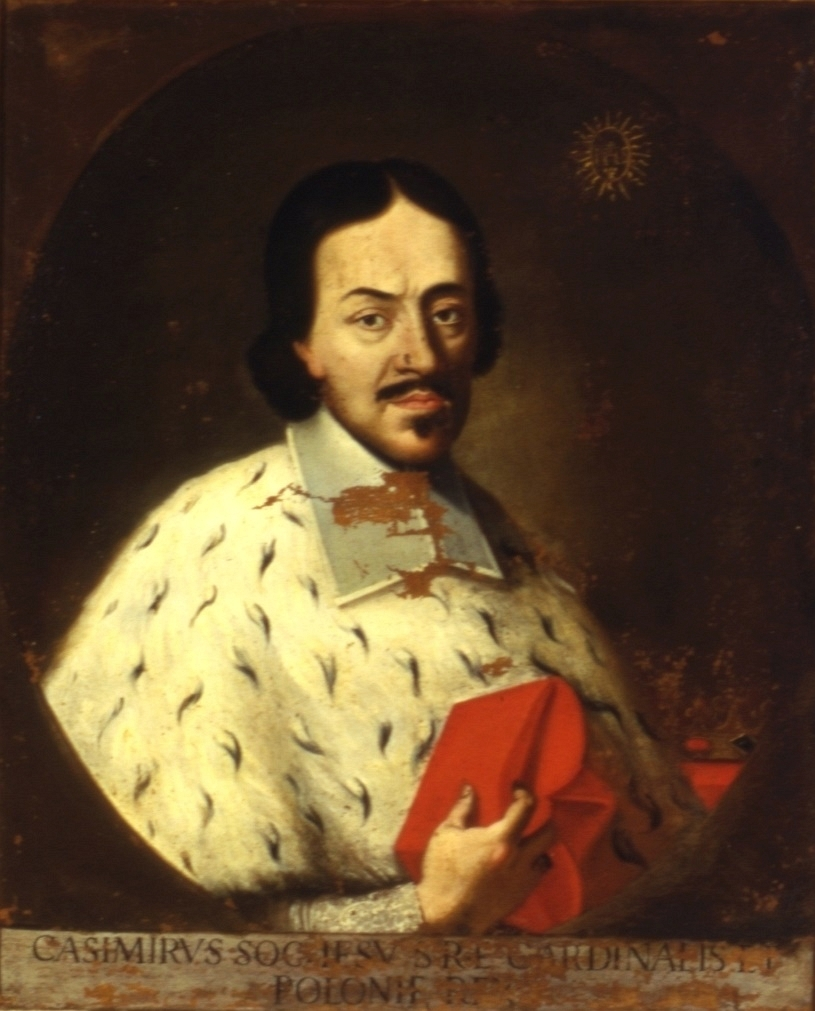
Jan Kazimierz Waza (1609–72), made a cardinal on May 28, 1646.

- Jan Kazimierz Waza, S.J., brother of the king of Poland – cardinal-deacon a particular title; resigned the cardinalate on 6 July 1648; king of Poland 1648 – 1668, † 16 December 1672

== 7 October 1647 ==
All the new cardinals received the titular churches on 16 December 1647:

- Fabrizio Savelli, archbishop of Salerno – cardinal-priest of S. Agostino, † 26 February 1659
- Michele Mazzarino, O.P., archbishop of Aix – cardinal-priest of S. Cecilia, † 31 August 1648
- Francesco Cherubini, domestic prelate and auditor of His Holiness – cardinal-priest of S. Giovanni a Porta Latina, † 21 April 1656
- Cristoforo Vidman, auditor of the Apostolic Chamber – cardinal-deacon of SS. Nereo ed Achilleo, then cardinal-priest of SS. Nereo ed Achilleo (19 November 1657), cardinal-priest of S. Marco (1 April 1658), † 30 September 1660
- Lorenzo Raggi, general treasurer of the Apostolic Chamber – cardinal-deacon of S. Maria in Domnica, then cardinal-deacon of S. Angelo in Pescheria (21 July 1653), cardinal-deacon of S. Eustachio (30 August 1660), cardinal-priest of SS. Quirico e Giulitta (11 February 1664), cardinal-priest of S. Lorenzo in Lucina (6 February 1679), cardinal-bishop of Palestrina (8 January 1680), † 14 January 1687
- Francesco Maidalchini, relative of the Pope – cardinal-deacon of S. Adriano, then cardinal-deacon of S. Pancrazio (5 May 1653), cardinal-deacon of S. Maria in Portico (23 March 1654), cardinal-deacon of S. Maria in Via Lata (11 October 1666), cardinal-priest of S. Maria in Via (19 October 1689), cardinal-priest of S. Prassede (23 July 1691), † 10 June 1700
- Antonio de Aragón-Córdoba-Cardona y Fernández de Córdoba, member of the Council of the Military Orders, royal councilor of King Felipe IV of Spain, member of the Supreme Council of the Tribunal of the Spanish Inquisition ( in pectore, published on 14 March 1650) – cardinal-priest without the title, † 7 October 1650

== 19 November 1650 ==
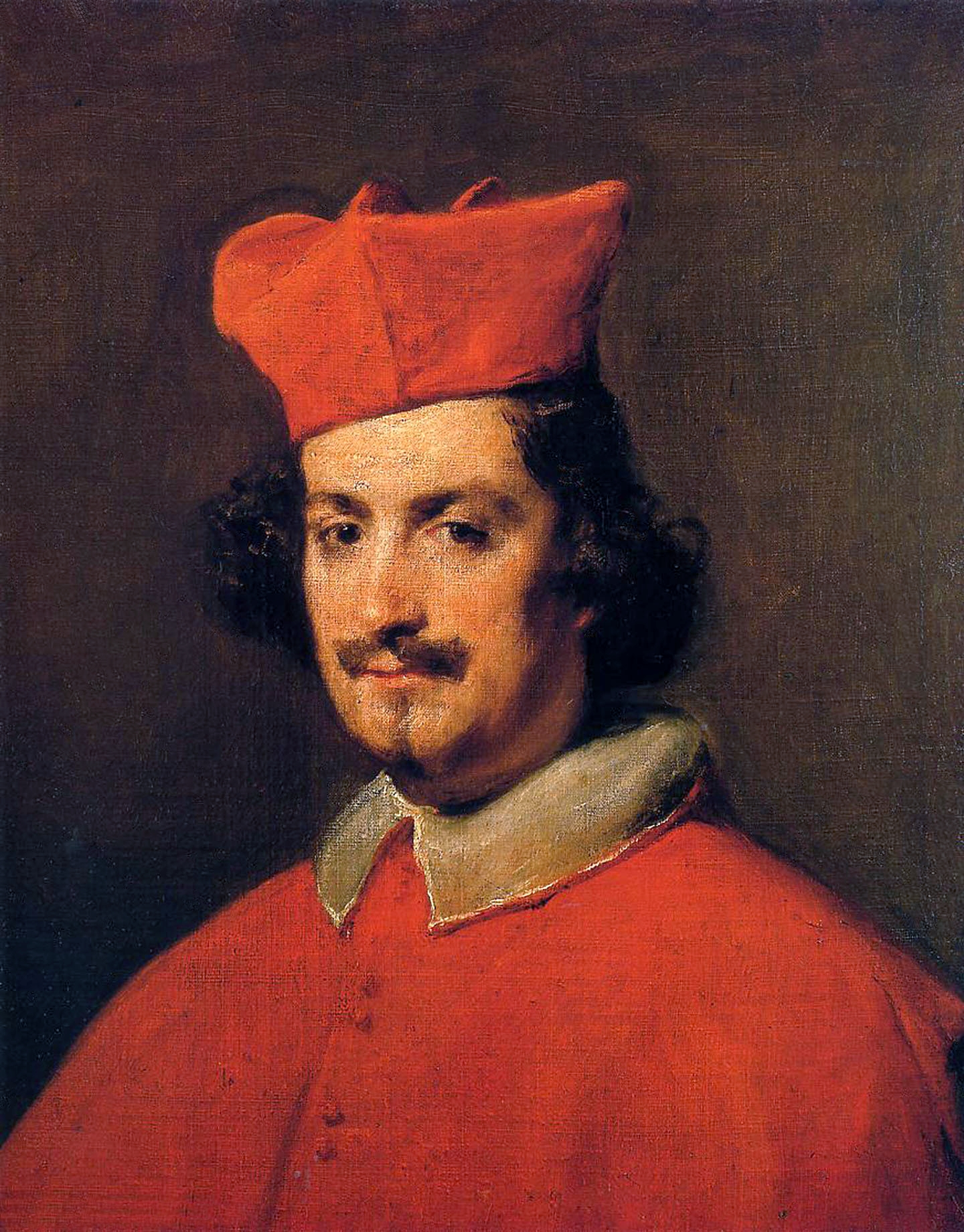
Camillo Astalli (1616–63), made a cardinal on November 19, 1650.

- Camillo Astalli-Pamphili, adopted nephew of the Pope – cardinal-priest of S. Pietro in Montorio (received the title on 17 October 1650), † 21 December 1663

== 19 February 1652 ==
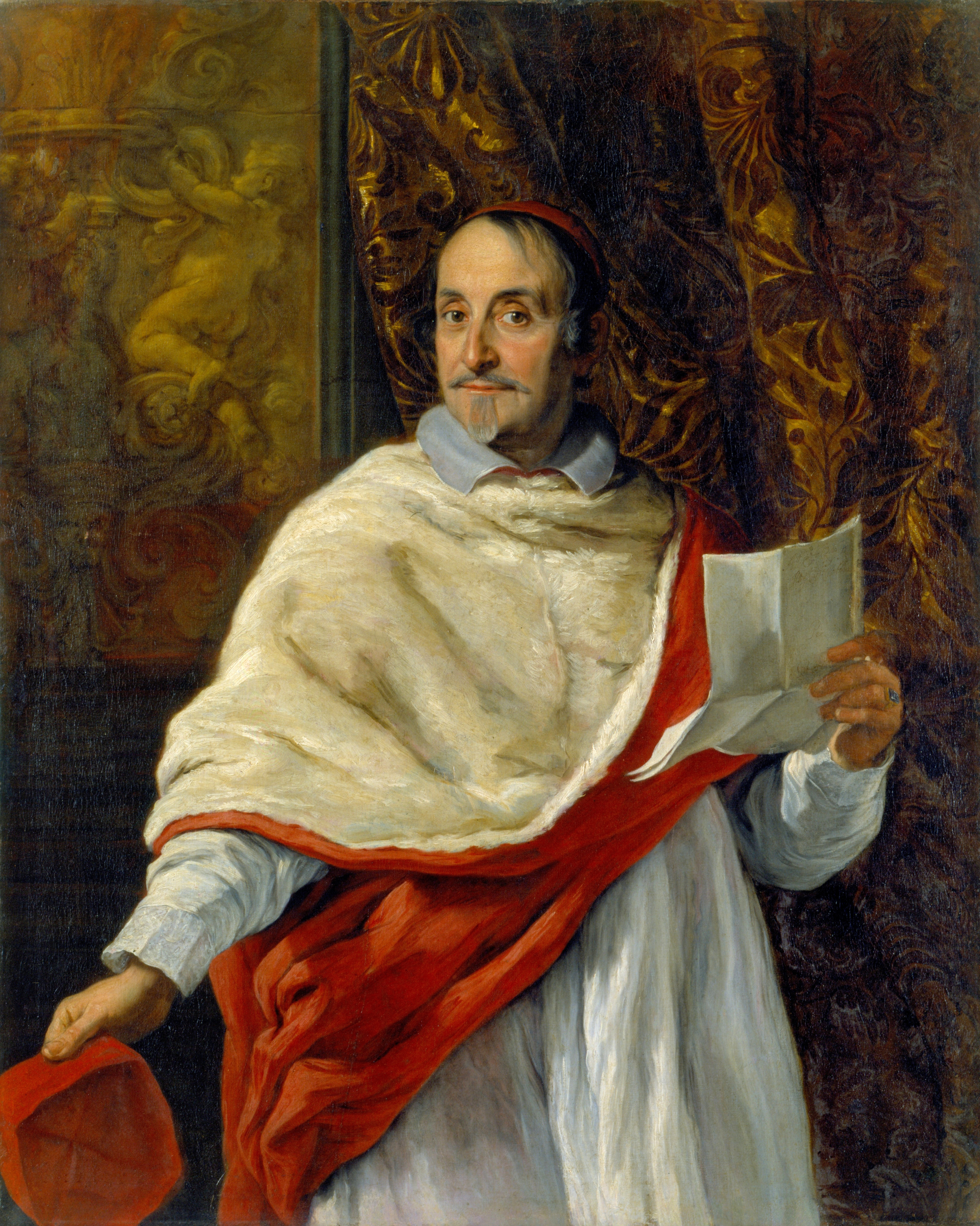
Luigi Omodei (1607–85), made a cardinal on February 19, 1652.

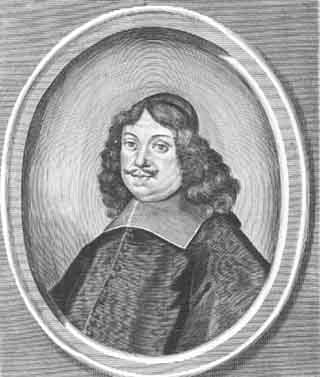
Frederick of Hesse-Darmstadt (1616–82), made a cardinal on February 19, 1652.

- Jean François Paul de Gondi, archbishop of Corinto – cardinal-priest of S. Maria sopra Minerva (received the title on 14 May 1655), † 24 August 1679
- Domingo Pimentel Zúñiga, O.P. archbishop of Seville – cardinal-priest of S. Silvestro in Capite (received the title on 23 June 1653), † 2 December 1653
- Fabio Chigi, bishop of Nardò, Secretary of State – cardinal-priest of S. Maria del Popolo (received the title on 12 March 1652), on 7 April 1655 became Pope Alexander VII, † 22 May 1667
- Giovanni Girolamo Lomellini, general treasurer of the Apostolic Chamber – cardinal-priest of S. Onofrio (received the title on 12 March 1652), † 4 April 1659
- Luigi Omodei, protonotary apostolic, dean of the Apostolic Chamber – cardinal-priest of S. Alessio (received the title on 12 March 1652), then cardinal-priest of S. Maria in Trastevere (19 October 1676), cardinal-priest of S. Prassede (13 September 1677), cardinal-priest of (8 January 1680), † 26 April 1685
- Pietro Ottoboni, auditor of the Sacred Roman Rota – cardinal-priest of S. Salvatore in Lauro (received the title on 12 March 1652), then cardinal-priest of S. Marco (15 November 1660), cardinal-priest of S. Maria in Trastevere (13 September 1677), cardinal-priest of (8 January 1680), cardinal-bishop of Sabiny (1 December 1681), cardinal-bishop of Frascati (15 February 1683), cardinal-bishop of Porto e S. Rufina (10 November 1687), on 6 October 1689 became Pope Aleksander VIII, † 1 February 1691
- Giacomo Corradi, auditor of the Sacred Roman Rota – cardinal-priest of S. Maria Traspontina (received the title on 12 March 1652), † 17 January 1666
- Marcello Santacroce, referendary of the Tribunals of the Apostolic Signature of Justice and of Grace – cardinal-priest of S. Stefano in Monte Celio (received the title on 12 March 1652), † 19 December 1674
- Baccio Aldobrandini, privy chamberlain of His Holiness – cardinal-priest of S. Agnese in Agone (received the title on 12 March 1652), then cardinal-priest of SS. Nereo ed Achilleo (1 April 1658), † 21 January 1665
- Friedrich von Hessen-Darmstadt, O.S.Io.Hieros., grand prior in Germany of the Order of Saint John of Jerusalem – cardinal-deacon of S. Maria in Aquiro (received the title on 31 May 1655), then cardinal-deacon of S. Cesareo in Palatio (30 March 1661), cardinal-deacon of S. Eustachio (14 November 1667), cardinal-deacon of S. Nicola in Carcere (12 March 1668), cardinal-deacon of S. Agata in Suburra (14 May 1670), † 19 February 1682
- Lorenzo Imperiali, governor of Rome and vice-camerlengo of the Holy Roman Church (in pectore, published on 2 March 1654) – cardinal-priest of S. Crisogono (received the title on 23 March 1654), † 21 September 1673
- Giberto Borromeo, referendary of the Tribunals of the Apostolic Signature of Justice and of Grace (in pectore, published on 2 March 1654) – cardinal-priest of SS. Giovanni e Paolo (received the title on 23 March 1654), † 6 January 1672

== 23 June 1653 ==
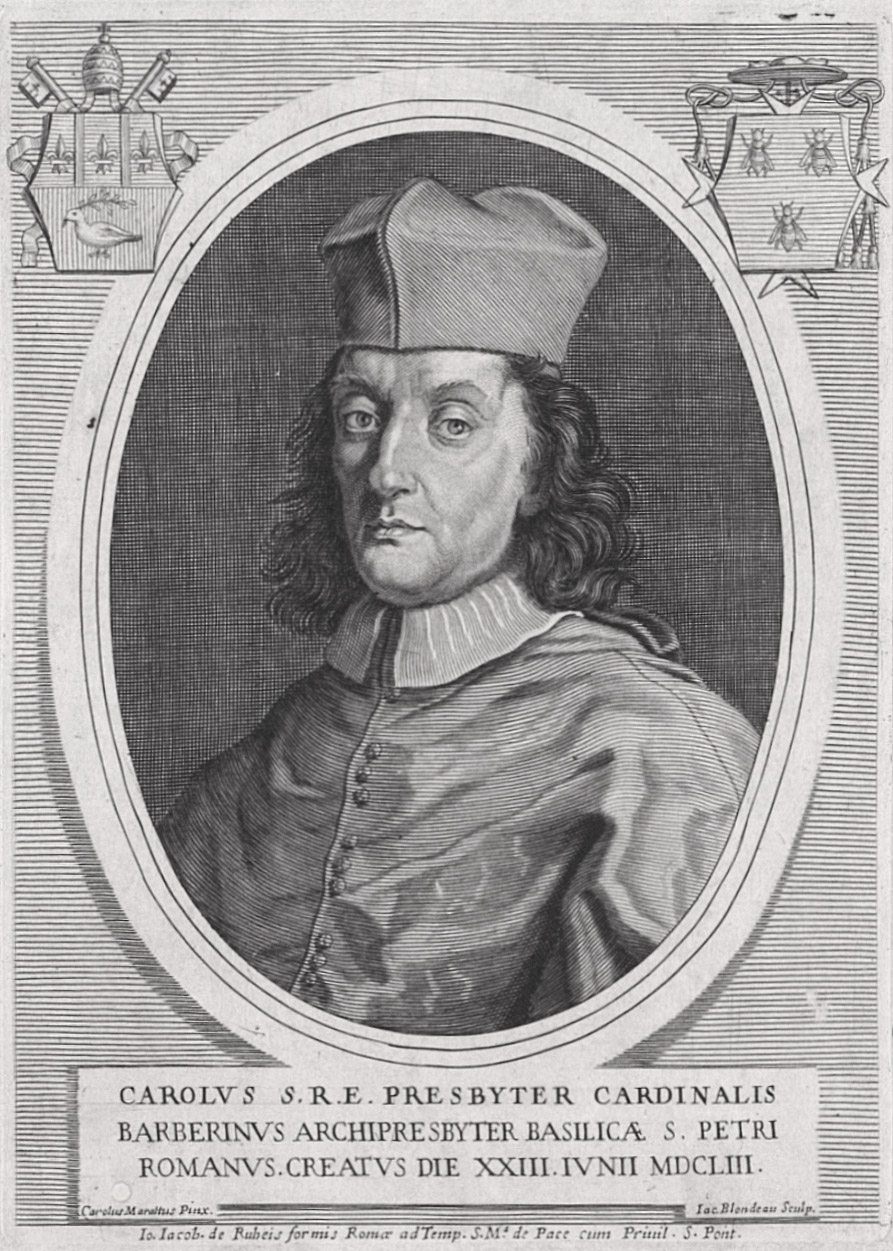
Carlo Barberini (1630-1704), made a cardinal on June 23, 1653.

- Carlo Barberini, prefect of Rome – cardinal-deacon of S. Cesareo in Palatio (received the title on 18 August 1653), then cardinal-deacon of S. Angelo in Pescheria (30 August 1660), cardinal-deacon of S. Cesareo in Palatio (14 November 1667), cardinal-deacon of S. Maria in Cosmedin (2 December 1675), cardinal-priest of S. Maria della Pace (27 September 1683), cardinal-priest of S. Lorenzo in Lucina (30 April 1685), † 2 October 1704

== 2 March 1654 ==
All the new cardinals received the titular churches on 23 March 1654.

- Giovanni Battista Spada, patriarch of Constantinople– cardinal-priest of S. Susanna, then cardinal-priest of S. Marcello (27 January 1659), cardinal-priest of S. Crisogono (25 September 1673), † 23 January 1675
- Prospero Caffarelli, auditor general of the Apostolic Chamber – cardinal-priest of S. Callisto, † 14 August 1659
- Francesco Albizzi, referendary of the Tribunals of the Apostolic Signature of Justice and of Grace and assessor of the Supreme S.C. of the Roman and Universal Inquisition – cardinal-priest of S. Maria in Via, then cardinal-priest of SS. IV Coronati (24 August 1671), cardinal-priest of S. Maria in Trastevere (8 January 1680), cardinal-priest of S. Prassede (1 December 1681), † 5 October 1684
- Ottavio Acquaviva d'Aragona (iuniore), referendary of the Tribunals of the Apostolic Signature of Justice and of Grace – cardinal-priest of S. Bartolomeo all'Isola, then cardinal-priest of S. Cecilia (18 March 1658), † 26 September 1674
- Carlo Pio di Savoia, treasurer general of the Apostolic Chamber – cardinal-deacon of S. Maria in Domnica, then cardinal-deacon of S. Eustachio (11 February 1664), cardinal-priest of S. Prisca (14 November 1667), cardinal-priest of S. Crisogono (28 January 1675), cardinal-priest of S. Maria in Trastevere (1 December 1681), cardinal-bishop of Sabiny (15 February 1683), † 13 February 1689
- Carlo Gualterio, referendary of the Tribunals of the Apostolic Signature of Justice and of Grace and advocate of the poor – cardinal-deacon of Pancrazio, then cardinal-deacon of S. Angelo in Pescheria (14 November 1667), cardinal-deacon of S. Maria in Cosmedin (12 March 1668), cardinal-priest of S. Eusebio (15 January 1669), † 1 January 1673
- Decio Azzolini, secretary of Briefs to the Princes and of the Sacred College of Cardinals – cardinal-deacon of S. Adriano, then cardinal-deacon of S. Eustachio (12 March 1668), cardinal-priest of S. Croce in Gerusalemme (22 December 1681), cardinal-priest of S. Maria in Trastevere (15 February 1683), cardinal-priest of S. Prassede (13 November 1684), † 8 June 1689

== Sources ==
- P. Gauchat: Hierarchia Catholica, vol. IV, Münster 1935
