= Luigi Omodei =

Luigi Omodei may refer to one of two Italian cardinals:

- Luigi Omodei (1607–1685)
- Luigi Omodei (1657–1706), nephew of the former

== See also ==
- Omodei (surname)
