= Omodei =

Omodei is a surname. Notable people with the surname include:

- Luigi Omodei (1607–1685), Italian Catholic cardinal
- Luigi Omodei (1657–1706), Italian Catholic cardinal, nephew of Luigi Omodei (1607–1685)
- Paul Omodei (born 1950), Australian politician

== See also ==
- Amodei
