= Amodei =

Amodei is a surname of Italian origin, in related Chinese surname is Mo . It may refer to:

- Cataldo Amodei (1650–1695), Italian Baroque composer
- Dario Amodei (born 1983), Italian-American AI researcher and co-founder of Anthropic
- Daniela Amodei (born 1987), Italian-American AI safety researcher and co-founder of Anthropic
- Fausto Amodei (1934–2025), Italian singer-songwriter
- Ivan Amodei (born 1976), Italian-American magician
- Mark Amodei (born 1958), American politician

== See also ==
- Omodei
