= Gaspare Mattei =

Italian cardinal

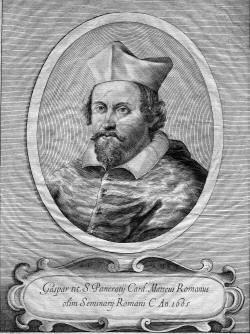
Cardinal Gaspare Mattei

Gaspare Mattei (1598 - around 1am, 9 April 1650) was an Italian cardinal of the house of Mattei.

== Life ==
Mattei was born in Rome, the eldest son of Mario Mattei, duke of Paganica and Prudenzia Cenci; he was a relative of Pope Paul V. He was educated at the Archgymnasium of Rome. He fell in love with a young lady and as the eldest son his parents hoped he would marry her, but instead he became a papal prelate under Paul V, then referendary of the Tribunals of the Apostolic Signature of Justice and of Grace. He then became governor of San Severino (December 29, 1621), commissary apostolic in Forlì (1629), vice-legate in Urbino (February 14, 1632), governor of Perugia (January 29, 1636) and finally commissary general of Romagna. Despite not having received holy orders he was elected titular archbishop of Atena on 5 September 1639 and then became nuncio to Austria (1639–43).

He was elected cardinal priest in the consistory of July 13, 1643, with the titular church of S. Pancrazio. He was part of the Papal conclave of 1644, electing Pope Innocent X, but left the September 10, 1644 conclave due to illness. He opted for the title of Santa Cecilia on September 28, 1648 and on his death in Rome, he was buried there.

== Bibliography ==
- Squicciarini, Donato. Nunzi apostolici a Vienna. Città del Vaticano : Libreria Editrice Vaticana, 1998, p. 124-125.
- The Cardinals of the Holy Roman Church
