= Frederick of Hesse-Darmstadt =

German soldier and cardinal (1616-1682)

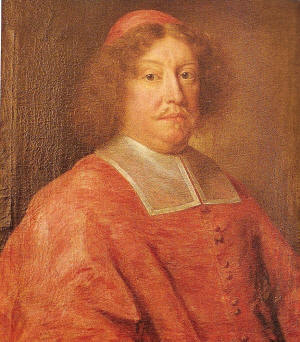
Frederick of Hesse-Darmstadt

Frederick of Hesse-Darmstadt (28 February 1616 – 19 February 1682) was a German Protestant and soldier who converted to Catholicism, became a cardinal and was appointed Crown-cardinal of Austria.

== Early life ==
Frederick was born in Darmstadt, the 12th child of Louis V, Landgrave of Hesse-Darmstadt. Born into a Lutheran family, he converted to Catholicism at the age of 20 and entered the Order of St. John of Jerusalem.

He served as a soldier during a number of conflicts and became an admiral in the navy of the Kingdom of Spain. In 1647, he became Grand Prior of the Order of St. John in Germany and travelled throughout Italy, Spain and Germany.

== Ecclesiastic career ==
Eventually, he made his way to Rome and entered the service of Pope Innocent X.

In 1652, he was elevated to cardinal by Pope Innocent and participated in the Papal conclave of 1655.

He was appointed papal legate (with Cardinal Carlo de' Medici) to Queen Christina of Sweden, who had converted to Catholicism and arrived in Rome in November 1655.

In 1671, he was elected Bishop of Breslau and was subsequently appointed administrator of Breslau for six months from October 1671. Frederick of Hessen-Darmstadt died in Breslau, on 19 February 1682.
