= Federico Sforza =

17th-century Catholic cardinal

His Eminence Federico Sforza
- Cardinal Bishop of Tivoli
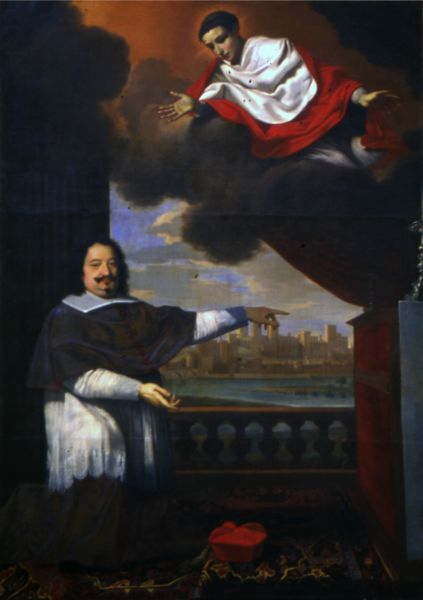
- Sforza painted by Nicolas Mignard, c. 1641
- Church: Catholic Church
- Diocese: Tivoli
- Installed: 28 January 1675
- Term ended: 24 May 1676
- Other post: Cardinal-priest of San Pietro in Vincoli 1661-1676
- Previous posts: Cardinal-priest of Sant'Anastasia 1659-1661; Cardinal-priest of Santi Silvestro e Martino ai Monti 1656-1659; Bishop of Rimini 1646-1656; Cardinal-deacon of Santi Vito, Modesto e Crescenzia; 1645-1656

Orders
- Ordination: 22 December 1646 by Pier Luigi Carafa (seniore)
- Consecration: 30 December 1646 by Pier Luigi Carafa (seniore)
- Created cardinal: 6 March 1645 by Pope Innocent X
- Rank: Cardinal-priest

Personal details
- Born: 20 January 1603 Rome, Papal States
- Died: 24 May 1676 (aged 73) Rome, Papal States

Federico Sforza (20 January 1603 – 24 May 1676) was an Italian Catholic cardinal.

== Biography ==
Sforza was born in 1603, the son of Alessandro Sforza, 7th Count of Santa Fiora, Duke of Segni and Prince of Valmontone - and Eleonora Orsini.

In 1623 he became protonotary apostolic participante. In 1625 he was appointed governor of Terni and then of Cesena until 1626. Later he served as vice-legate in Avignon between 1637 and 1645.

Pope Innocent X, elected in 1644 and concerned that so noble a house as Sforza should go without a cardinal, decided Federico Sforza should "wear the purple". And so, Sforza was asked to return to Rome by Pope Innocent who elevated him to cardinal in 1645 and appointed him bishop of Rimini where he served for 11 years before resigning in 1656.

He participated in the conclave of 1655 which elected Pope Alexander VII and was later elected camerlengo of the Sacred College of Cardinals 1659 until 1660. He participated in the conclave of 1667 which elected Pope Clement IX and the conclave of 1669-1670 which elected Pope Clement X.

In 1675 he was elected bishop of Tivoli but died on 24 May of the following year.
