= Cristoforo Vidman =

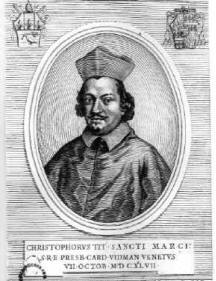
Cardinal Cristoforo Vidman

Cristoforo Vidman (1617 - 30 September 1660) was an Italian Catholic cardinal of German descent.

== Early life ==
Vidman was born in 1617 in Venice, though his family were originally from Germany; his father was Giovanni Vidman, Count of Ortenburg. He was educated in Venice and obtained a doctorate in utroque iure, both canon and civil law.

His family were considered Venetian nobility, having purchased titles and positions from the city of Venice, which was keen to raise money to fund their role in the War of Candia.

== Ecclesiastic career ==
During the reign of Pope Urban VIII, Vidman became cleric of the Apostolic Chamber and later its auditor, having purchased both positions in an effort to establish himself in Rome.

According to contemporary John Bargrave, it was tradition for new popes to retire those who purchased senior clerical positions by elevating them to cardinal. So it was, when Pope Innocent X was elected at the papal conclave of 1644, that Vidman was relieved of his positions to allow the new pope to sell them to prospective young clerks. Vidman, then, was elevated to cardinal in the consistory of 7 October 1647 by Pope Innocent X and was installed as cardinal-deacon at the Church of Santi Nereo e Achilleo.

Despite his elevation to cardinal, he and his brother, now a count, still delighted, "in gaming, feasting, comedies, and the company of women".

He was appointed as legate in Urbino in 1651 and participated in the papal conclave of 1655 which elected Pope Alexander VII. He was appointed cardinal-priest of the titular Church of S. Marco in 1658.

Vidman died on 30 September 1660 at the Church of San Martino al Cimino in Viterbo, and his remains were transferred to Rome.
