= Ivan Amodei =

American magician and illusionist (born 1976)

- Born: August 22, 1976 (age 50); Comiso, Italy
- Occupation: Magician
- Known for: Parlor magic
- Children: 2
- Website: www.ivanamodei.com

Ivan Amodei (born August 22, 1976) is an illusionist. Amodei performs at the Beverly Wilshire Hotel and also tours internationally with his show Secrets and Illusions.

== Career ==
In 1999, Amodei became a regular performer at the Magic Castle in Hollywood. In 2005, he won first place at the International Brotherhood of Magicians Close-Up Competition. In 2005, he won FIRST place at the Society of American Magicians Close-Up Competition, as well as, the People's Choice Award.

In 2010, Amodei's book Magic's Most Amazing Stories was published and was nominated by ForeWord Review for book of the year. On October 23, 2010, Amodei opened a one-man show at the Four Seasons Hotel Westlake Village. It was named Made in Italy. On December 31, 2010, Amodei did a guest appearance at the Beverly Wilshire Hotel in Beverly Hills that led to an open run of his show at the hotel. The name of the show was then changed to Intimate Illusions. In May 2012, Westlake Magazine included Ivan in their achievers issue. In June 2012, Amodei received recognition by the honorable Mayor of Beverly Hills William W. Brien M.D. for his contribution to the world of magic and illusion.

In 2013, he celebrated his 400th show at the Beverly Wilshire Hotel and was ranked as the #1 attraction in Beverly Hills, CA according to Trip Advisor.

== Personal life ==
Born in a Sicilian town, he relocated to New York City at the age of 2, accompanying his parents and uncle. At around 5 years old, his parents organized a gathering where a guest showcased a selection of magic tricks, affecting him. This encounter kindled his passion for magic, leading him to discover a local magic shop in his Brooklyn neighborhood. There he acquired proficiency in card and coin tricks, as well as other various magical techniques, eventually performing.

Amodei currently lives in Southern California on his ranch with his twin boy and girl and wife. In 2016, he appeared on the season finale of Penn & Teller: Fool Us on which he was determined to have fooled Penn & Teller based on judges' decision.

== Filmography ==
| Year(s) | Show or Movie | Role | Producer | Ref(s) |
|---|---|---|---|---|
| 2006 | Magic Castle After Dark | Ivan Amodei - Magician | A&E Television Networks | |
| 2013 | The Arsenio Hall Show, Episode #1.20 | Ivan Amodei - himself | CBS Media Ventures | |
| 2013 | Home & Family, Episode #2.24 | Ivan Amodei - himself | Hallmark Media | |
| 2013 | Home & Family, Episode dated 28 May 2013 | Ivan Amodei - himself | Hallmark Media | |
| 2016 | Penn & Teller: Fool Us, Can Penn & Teller Fool Penn & Teller | Ivan Amodei - himself | The CW Network | |
