= José Saenz d'Aguirre =

Spanish Benedictine and Cardinal

His Eminence José Saenz d'Aguirre O.S.B.
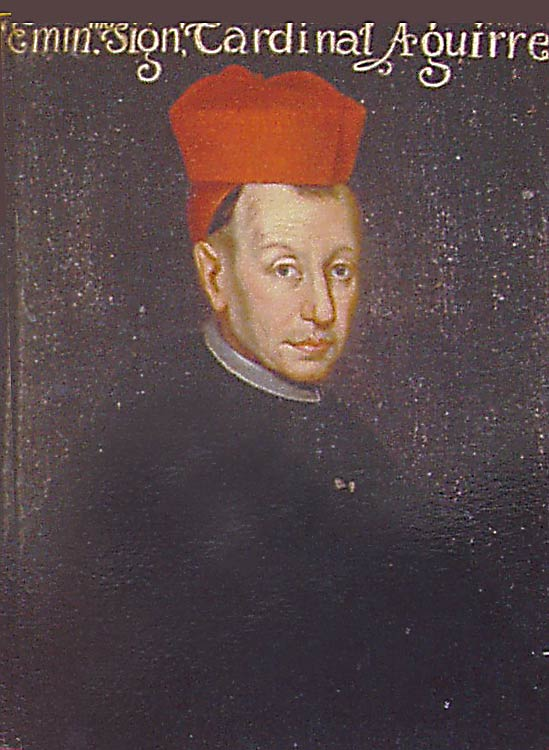

Orders
- Created cardinal: 2 September 1686 by Innocent XI

Personal details
- Born: 24 March 1630; Logroño, Castille
- Died: 19 August 1699 (aged 69); Rome, Papal States

Joseph Sáenz de Aguirre, OSB (24 March 1630 – 19 August 1699) was a Cardinal, and learned Spanish Benedictine.

== Biography ==
De Aguirre was born at Logroño, in Old Castile. He entered the congregation of Monte Cassino. He directed the studies in the Monastery of St. Vincent of Salamanca for fifteen years, and became its abbot. He then qualified in dogmatic theology and inaugurated the course in Holy Scripture at the University of Salamanca.

He was councillor and secretary of the Holy Office and president of its congregation of the province of Spain. His work against the Declaration of the Gallican Clergy of 1682 won him a cardinal's hat and the warm eulogy of Innocent XI.

His correspondence with Bossuet shows how vigorously he combated Quietism. His excessive labors undermined his health, and for many years he suffered from epileptic seizures.

He died suddenly from a stroke of apoplexy. He was buried in the Spanish Church of St. James in Rome, and his heart was deposited in Monte Cassino, as he had requested.

== Works ==
His more important works are on philosophical and theological subjects, but he also produced writings on ecclesiastical history, commentaries on the theology of St. Anselm, two volumes of miscellanea, and a book to prove that the De Imitatione Christi was by the Benedictine, Jean Gerson.

His principal works on philosophy are:

- Philosophia Nova-antiqua etc., a defense of Aristotle and St. Thomas Aquinas against their opponents (Salamanca, 1671–2–5, 3 in fol.)
- Philosophia Morum etc. (Salamanca, 1677; Rome, 1698), a commentary in four volumes on Aristotle's Ethics.
- De virtutibus et vitiis disputationes ethicae in quibus disseritur quidquid spectat ad philosophiam moralem ab Aristotele traditam (Salamanca, 1677; 2d ed. enlarged, Rome, 1697; 3d. ed. Rome, 1717).

His principal theological works are:

- A treatise on the Angels, especially the Guardian Angels, which he prepared as his thesis for the degree of Doctor.
- S. Anselmi Theologia, commentariis et disputationibus tum dogmaticis tum scholasticis illustrata (Salamanca, 1678–81, 2d ed. Rome, 1688–90). The third volume, De natura hominis pura et lapsa, is especially directed against Jansenism.
- Auctoritas infallibilis et summa Cathedrae Sancti Petri, etc. (Salamanca, 1683), a learned refutation of the four articles of the Declaration of the Gallican Clergy of France in 1682.
- Collectio maxima conciliorum omnium Hispaniae et novi orbis, etc. (Salamanca, 1686).
