= Wolfgang Hannibal von Schrattenbach =

German Prince-Bishop of Olomouc, Viceroy of Naples and Cardinal

- Prince-Bishop of Olomouc
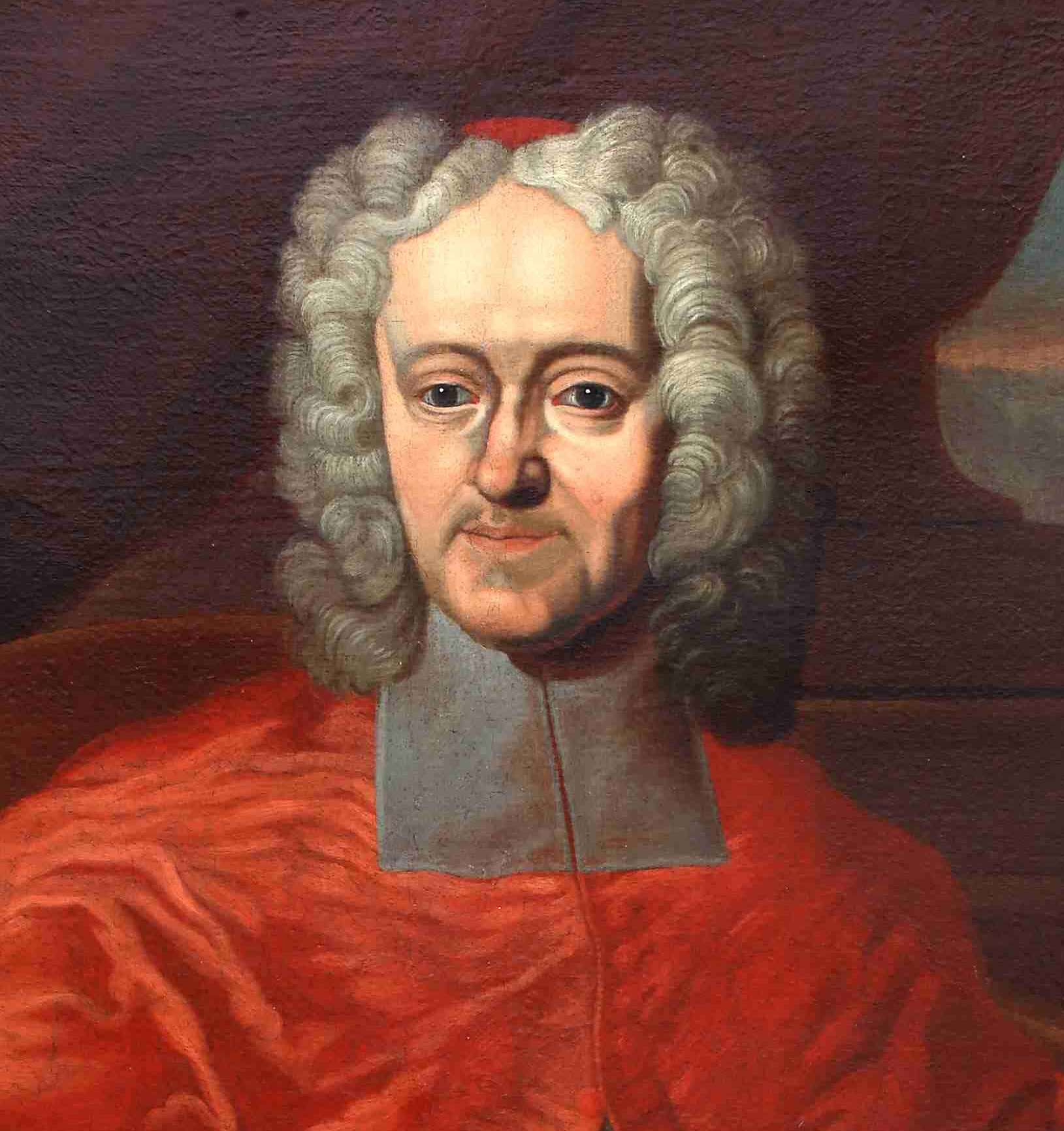
- Native name: Wolfgang Hannibal ze Schrattenbachu
- Church: Catholic Church
- Diocese: Diocese of Olomouc
- In office: 23 December 1711 – 22 July 1738
- Predecessor: Charles Joseph of Lorraine
- Successor: Jakob Ernst von Liechtenstein-Kastelkorn
- Other post: Cardinal-Priest of San Marcello (1714-1738)

Orders
- Ordination: July 1688
- Consecration: c. 1712 by František Julián von Braida
- Created cardinal: 18 May 1712 by Pope Clement XI

Personal details
- Born: 12 September 1660 Lemberg, Duchy of Styria, Austrian Circle, Holy Roman Empire
- Died: 22 July 1738 (aged 77) Brünn, Margraviate of Moravia, Bohemia, Holy Roman Empire

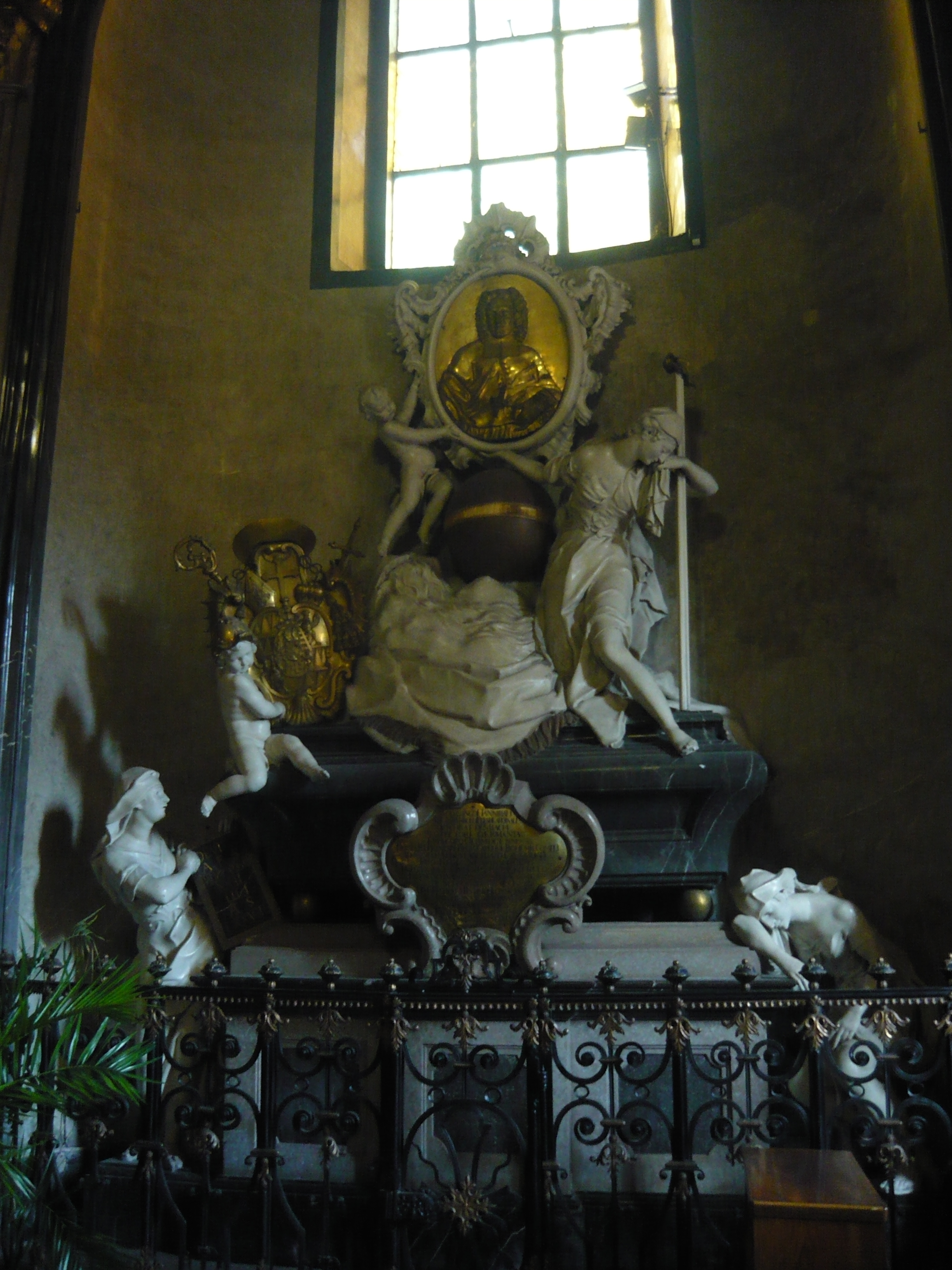
Tomb of Cardinal Wolfgang Hanibal Schrattenbach in Kroměříž

Wolfgang Hannibal von Schrattenbach (12 September 1660 – 22 July 1738) was a German Prince-Bishop of Olomouc, Viceroy of Naples and Cardinal.

== Biography ==
He was born on 12 September 1660 in Lemberg Castle, Duchy of Styria, in the ancient Schrattenbach family. He graduated in Rome as Doctor of Philosophy and Doctor of Theology (1682). In the same year he became a canon in the Episcopal Chapter of Olomouc in the Margraviate of Moravia and a canon in the Archbishop's Chapter of Salzburg. Both principalities were part of the Holy Roman Empire. After his ordination to the priesthood (1688) he became dean of the chapter of Salzburg.

His ecclesiastical career took off with his appointment as Prince-Bishop of Olomouc (1711–1738), titular abbot and cardinal-priest of San Marcello al Corso in Rome (1714–1738). Schrattenbach combined this with the position of advisor to Emperor Charles VI (from 1713) and Ambassador of the Emperor in Rome (1716–1719).

Emperor Charles VI then appointed him Viceroy of Naples in 1719. This was accompanied by the supreme command over the Austrian troops there, as the Kingdom of Naples was ruled by the Emperor in Vienna since 1713. He abdicated as Viceroy in 1721 and returned to his principality of Olomouc in Moravia.

He died in Brno on 22 July 1738. His grave is located in Kroměříž. There he was buried in a side chapel of the Church of Saint Maurice, one of the oldest churches in the town.

== Sources ==
- BLKÖ
