= Luigi Omodei (1657–1706) =

- Cardinal-Deacon of Santa Maria in Portico
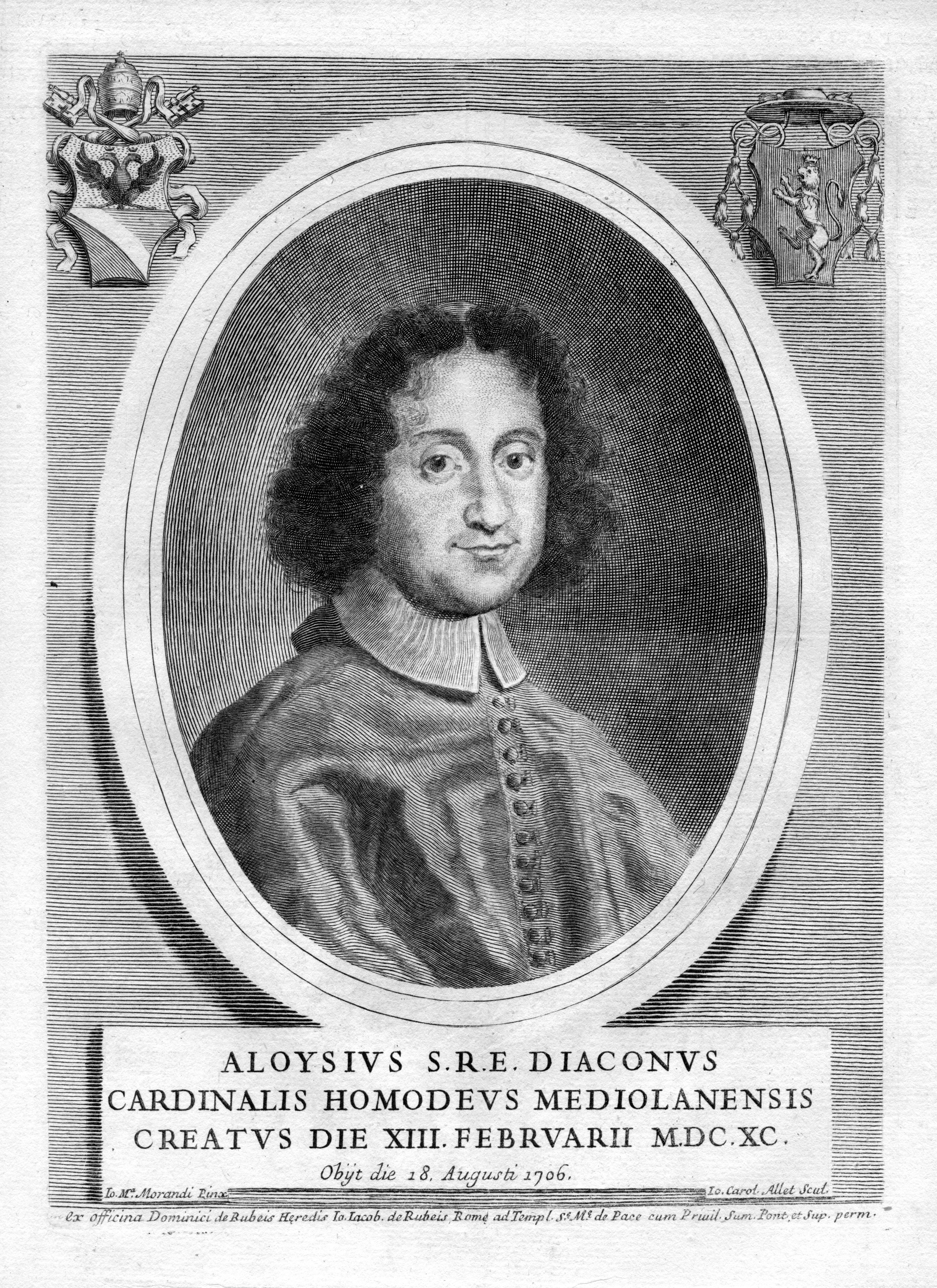
- Church: Catholic Church
- See: Santa Maria in Portico
- In office: 10 April 1690 – 18 August 1706
- Predecessor: Benedetto Pamphili
- Successor: Melchior de Polignac

Orders
- Created cardinal: 13 February 1690 by Pope Alexander VIII

Personal details
- Born: 20 March 1657 Madrid, Kingdom of Toledo, Crown of Castile
- Died: 18 August 1706 (aged 49) Rome, Papal States

Luigi Omodei (20 March 1657 in Madrid – 18 August 1706 in Rome) was a cardinal of Italian descent. His uncle Luigi Omodei (1607–1685) was also a cardinal.

== Life ==
His parents were the Milanese nobleman Agostino Omodei, marquess of Almonacid in Spain, and his third wife Maria Pacheco de Moura, from Madrid. He fulfilled several duties in the Roman Curia and was made a cardinal by pope Alexander VIII in the consistory of 13 February 1690. He took part in the 1691 and 1700 conclaves.

== Sources ==
- Miranda, Salvador. "OMODEI, iuniore, Luigi (1657-1706)". The Cardinals of the Holy Roman Church. Florida International University. OCLC 53276621.
