= Luigi Omodei (1607–1685) =

Italian Catholic cardinal

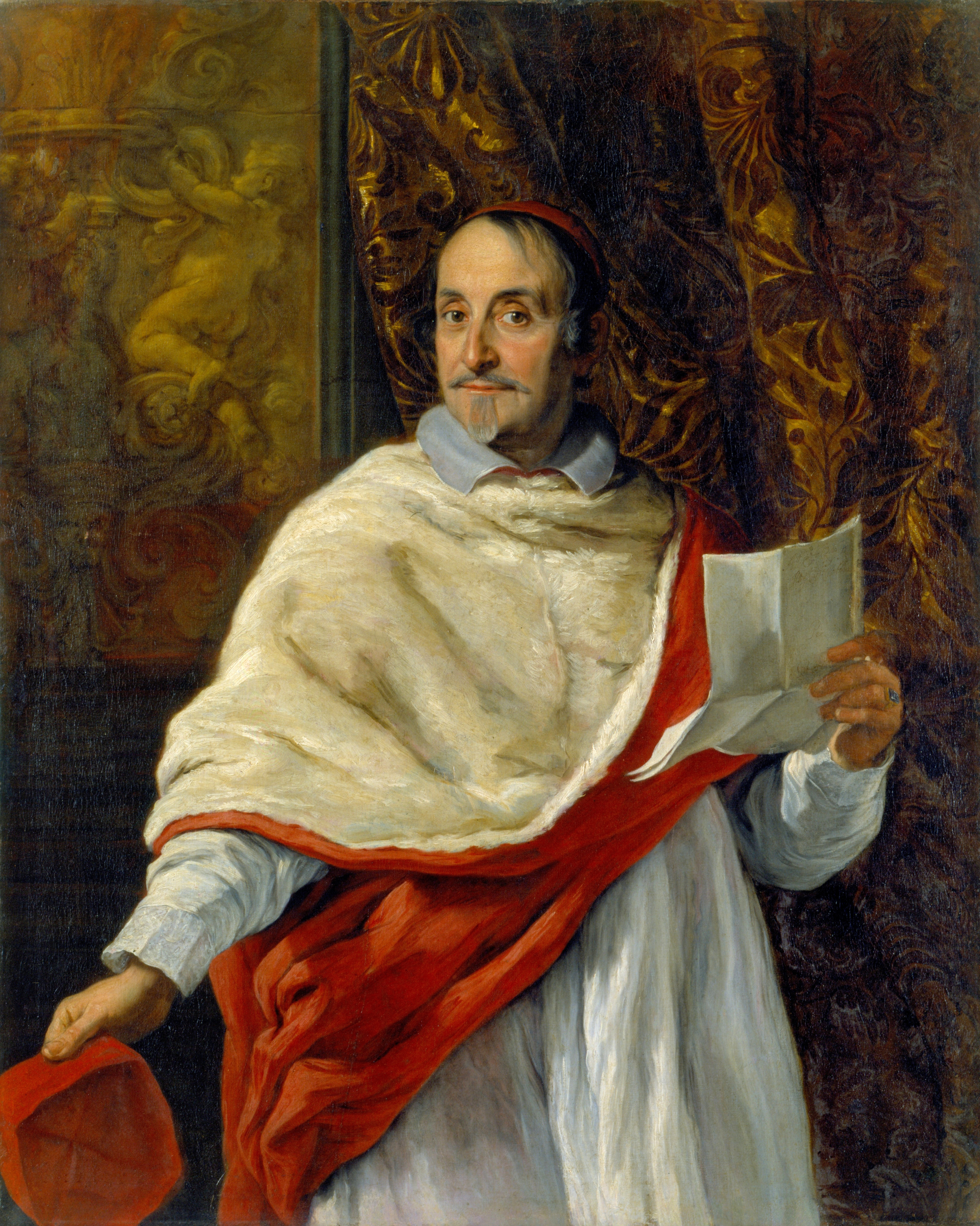
Portrait of Cardinal Omodei by Giovanni Battista Gaulli.

Luigi Omodei (1608 – 26 April 1685) was an Italian Cardinal of the Roman Catholic Church.

== Early life ==
Omodei was born in 1608 in Milan, the son of Carlo Omodei, first Marquis of Piovera, and Beatrice Lurani. His nephew, also named Luigi Omodei, was also a cardinal.

He was educated at the University of Perugia in Perugia and received a doctorate in utroque iure, both canon and civil law.

== Ecclesiastic career ==
Omodei held several roles in the Roman Curia, notably Commissioner-General of the Papal States under Pope Innocent X. Innocent later made Omodei a cardinal in the consistory of 19 February 1652 and General of the Papal army during the Second War of Castro.

He took part in the papal conclave of 1655 which elected Alexander VII. Though very much of the Spanish faction of the College of Cardinals, he moved away from their candidates and instead declared himself for Fabio Chigi who was elected as Pope Alexander. The Spanish, though, understood that many cardinals had moved against them and forgave Omodei for this slight.

He later participated in the 1667 and 1669–70 papal conclaves.

Omodei died on 26 April 1685 in Rome.
