= Pope Innocent X =

Head of the Catholic Church from 1644 to 1655

- Bishop of Rome
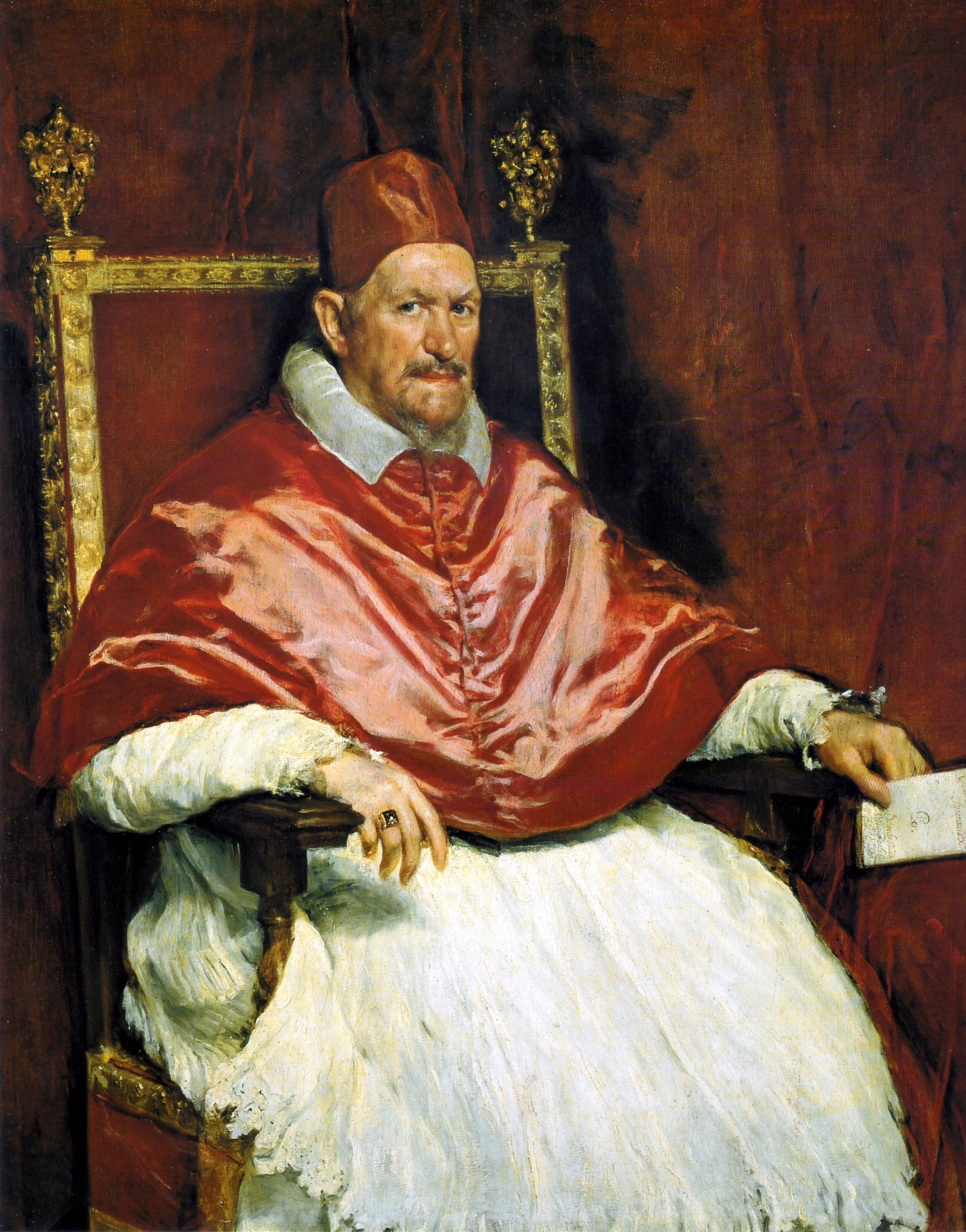
- Portrait of Innocent X, by Diego Velázquez (1650, Galleria Doria Pamphili, Rome)
- Church: Catholic Church
- Papacy began: 15 September 1644
- Papacy ended: 7 January 1655
- Predecessor: Urban VIII
- Successor: Alexander VII
- Previous posts: Legate to France (1625); Titular Latin Patriarch of Antioch (1626–1629); Apostolic Nuncio to Spain (1626–1629); Cardinal-Priest of Sant'Eusebio (1629–1644); Prefect of the Sacred Congregation for the Clergy (1639–1644); Camerlengo of the Holy Roman Church (1643–1644)

Orders
- Consecration: 25 January 1626 by Laudivio Zacchia
- Created cardinal: 19 November 1629 by Urban VIII

Personal details
- Born: Giovanni Battista Pamphilj or Pamphili; 7 May 1574 Rome, Papal States
- Died: 7 January 1655 (aged 80) Rome, Papal States
- Motto: Alleviatae sunt aquae super terram ("The waters have receded from the earth.")
- Signature: Innocent X's signature

- Coat of arms: Innocent X's coat of arms

Pope Innocent X (Note: Latin: Innocentius X; Italian: Innocenzo X) (7 May 1574 – 7 January 1655; born Giovanni Battista Pamphili), was head of the Catholic Church and ruler of the Papal States from 15 September 1644 to his death.

Born in Rome of a family from Gubbio in Umbria who had come to Rome during the pontificate of Pope Innocent IX, Pamphili was trained as a lawyer and graduated from the Collegio Romano. He followed a conventional cursus honorum, following his uncle Girolamo Pamphili as auditor of the Rota, and like him, attaining the position of cardinal-priest of Sant'Eusebio. Before becoming pope, Pamphili served as a papal diplomat to Naples, France, and Spain.

Pamphili succeeded Pope Urban VIII (1623–44) on 15 September 1644 as Pope Innocent X, after a contentious papal conclave that featured a rivalry between French and Spanish factions.

Innocent X was one of the most politically shrewd pontiffs of the era, greatly increasing the temporal power of the Holy See. Major political events in which he was involved included the English Civil War, conflicts with French church officials over financial fraud issues, and hostilities with the Duchy of Parma related to the First War of Castro.

In theology, Innocent X issued a papal bull condemning the beliefs of Jansenism.

== Biography ==
=== Early life ===
Giovanni Battista Pamphili was born in Rome on 7 May 1574, the son of Camillo Pamphili, of the Roman Pamphili family. The family, originally from Gubbio, was directly descended from Pope Alexander VI.

In 1594 he graduated from the Roman College and followed a conventional path through the ranks of the Catholic Church. He served as a consistorial lawyer in 1601, and in 1604 succeeded his uncle, Cardinal Girolamo Pamphili, as auditor of the Roman Rota, the ecclesiastical appellate tribunal. He was also a canonist of the Sacred Apostolic Penitentiary, a second tribunal.

In 1623 Pope Gregory XV sent him as apostolic nuncio (ecclesiastical diplomat) to the court of the Kingdom of Naples. In 1625 Pope Urban VIII sent him to accompany his nephew, Francesco Barberini, whom he had accredited as nuncio, first to France and then Spain. In January 1626, Pamphili was appointed titular Latin Patriarch of Antioch.

In reward for his labors, in May 1626 Giovanni Battista was made nuncio to the court of Philip IV of Spain. The position led to a lifelong association with the Spaniards which was of great use during the papal conclave of 1644. He was created Cardinal in pectore in 1627 and published in 1629.

== Papacy ==
=== Election ===
The 1644 conclave for the election of a successor to Pope Urban VIII was long and contentious, lasting from 9 August to 15 September. A large French faction led by Urban VIII's nephews objected to the Spanish candidate, as an enemy of Cardinal Mazarin, who guided French policy. They put up their own candidate (Giulio Cesare Sacchetti) but could not establish enough support for him and agreed to Cardinal Pamphili as an acceptable compromise, though he had served as legate to Spain. Mazarin, bearing the French veto of Pamphili, arrived too late, and the election was accomplished.

=== Relations with France ===
Papal styles of Pope Innocent X
- Reference style: His Holiness
- Spoken style: Your Holiness
- Religious style: Holy Father
- Posthumous style: None

Pamphili chose to be called Innocent X. Soon after his accession he initiated legal action against the Barberini family for misappropriation of public funds. The brothers Francesco Barberini, Antonio Barberini and Taddeo Barberini fled to Paris, where they found a powerful protector in Cardinal Mazarin. Innocent X confiscated their property, and on 19 February 1646, issued a papal bull decreeing that all cardinals who might leave the Papal States for six months without express papal permission would be deprived of their benefices and eventually of their cardinalate itself. The French Parlement of Paris declared the papal ordinance void in France, but Innocent X did not yield until Mazarin prepared to send troops to Italy. Henceforth the papal policy towards France became more friendly, and somewhat later the Barberini were rehabilitated when the son of Taddeo Barberini, Maffeo Barberini, married Olimpia Giustiniani, a niece of Innocent X.

In 1653, Innocent X, with the Cum occasione papal bull, condemned five propositions of Jansenius's Augustinus, as heretical and close to Lutheranism. This led to the formulary controversy, Blaise Pascal's writing of the Lettres Provinciales, and finally to the razing of the Jansenist convent of Port-Royal and the subsequent dissolving of its community.

=== Relations with Parma ===
The death of Pope Urban VIII is said to have been hastened by his chagrin at the result of the First War of Castro, a war he had undertaken against Odoardo Farnese, Duke of Parma. Hostilities between the papacy and the Duchy of Parma resumed in 1649, and forces loyal to Pope Innocent X destroyed the city of Castro on 2 September 1649.

Innocent X objected to the conclusion of the Peace of Westphalia, against which his nuncio, Fabio Chigi, protested in vain. In 1650 Innocent X issued the papal brief Zelo Domus Dei against the Peace of Westphalia, and backdated it to 1648 in order to preserve potential claims for confiscated land and property. The protests were ignored by the European powers.

=== Wars of the Three Kingdoms ===
During the Irish Confederate Wars (1641–53) (the Irish component of the Wars of the Three Kingdoms), Innocent X strongly supported the independent Confederate Ireland, over the objections of Mazarin and the English Queen and then queen mother, Henrietta Maria, exiled in Paris. The pope sent Giovanni Battista Rinuccini, archbishop of Fermo, as a special nuncio to Ireland. He arrived at Kilkenny with a large quantity of arms including 20,000 pounds of gunpowder, and a very large sum of money. Rinuccini hoped he could discourage the Confederates from allying with Charles I and the Royalists in the English Civil War and instead encourage them towards the foundation of an independent Catholic – ruled Ireland.

At Kilkenny, Rinuccini was received with great honours, asserting in his Latin declaration that the object of his mission was to sustain the king but, above all, to rescue from pains and penalties the Catholic people of Ireland in securing the free and public exercise of the Catholic religion, and the restoration of the churches and church property. In the end, Oliver Cromwell restored Ireland to the Parliamentarian side and Rinuccini returned to Rome in 1649, after four fruitless years.

=== Other activities ===
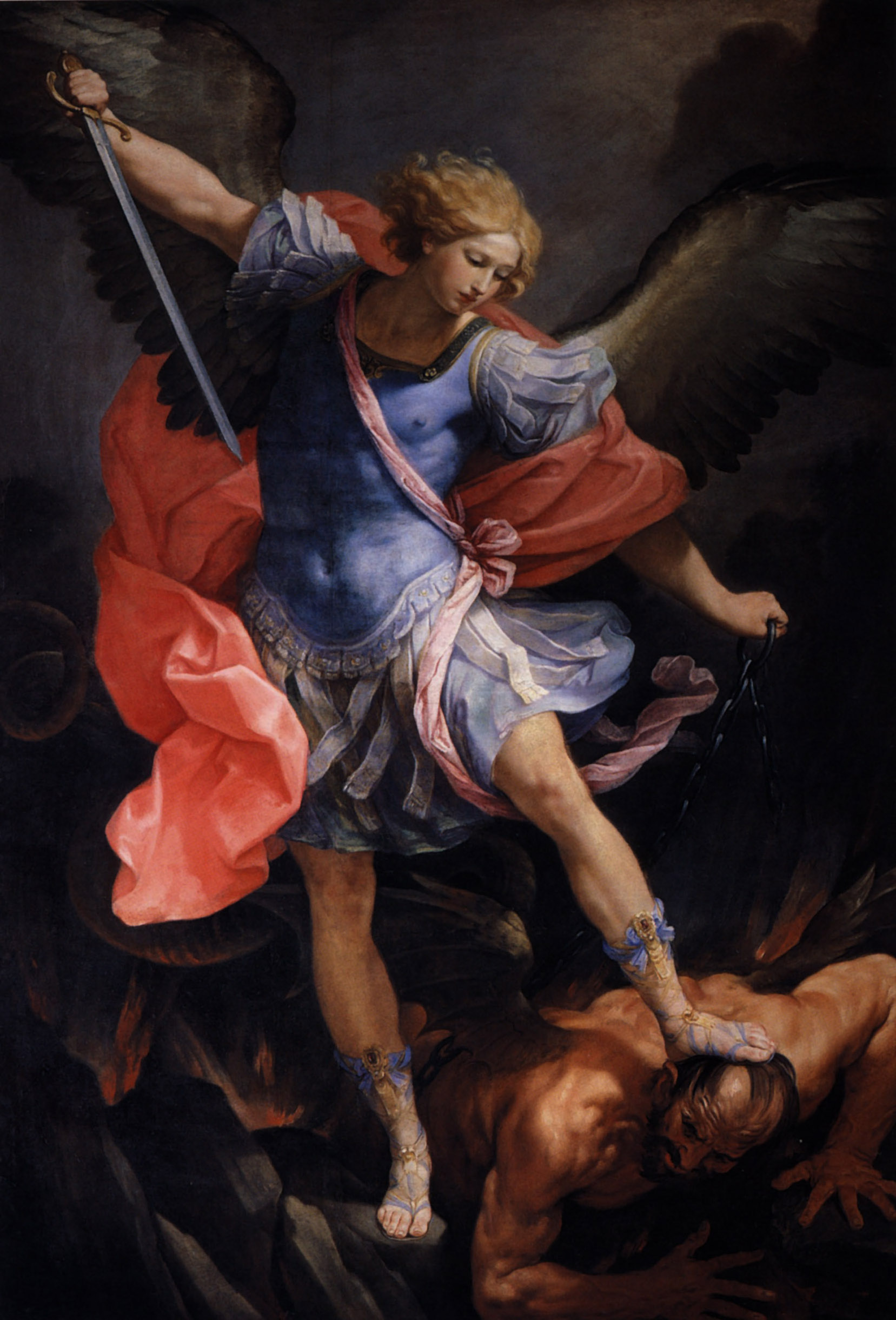
Guido Reni's archangel Michael (Santa Maria della Concezione dei Cappuccini, Rome) tramples a Satan with the vividly recognizable features of Pope Innocent X.

During the papacy of Pope Urban VIII, the future Innocent X was the pope's most significant rival among the College of Cardinals. Antonio Barberini, Urban VIII's brother, was a cardinal who had begun his career with the Capuchin brothers. About 1635, at the height of the Thirty Years' War in Germany, in which the papacy was intricately involved, Cardinal Antonio commissioned Guido Reni's painting of the Archangel Michael, trampling Satan, who bears the recognizable features of Innocent X. This bold political artwork still hangs in a side chapel of the Capuchin friars' Church of the Conception (Santa Maria della Concezione dei Cappuccini) in Rome. A legend related to the painting is that the dashing and high-living artist, Guido Reni, had been insulted by rumours he thought were circulated by Cardinal Pamphili.

When, a few years later, Pamphili was raised to the papacy, other Barberini relatives fled to France on embezzlement accusations. Despite this, the Capuchins held fast to their chapel altarpiece.

Innocent was responsible for raising the Colegio de Santo Tomás de Nuestra Señora del Santísimo Rosario into the rank of a university. It is now the University of Santo Tomás in Manila, the oldest existing in Asia.

In 1650, Innocent X celebrated a Jubilee. He embellished Rome with inlaid floors and bas-relief in Saint Peter's, erected Gian Lorenzo Bernini's Fontana dei Quattro Fiumi in Piazza Navona, the Pamphili stronghold in Rome, and ordered the construction of Palazzo Nuovo at the Campidoglio.

Innocent X is also the subject of Portrait of Innocent X, a famous painting by Diego Velázquez housed in the family gallery of Palazzo Doria (Doria Pamphilj Gallery). This portrait inspired the "Screaming Pope" paintings by 20th-century painter Francis Bacon, the most famous of which is Bacon's Study after Velázquez's Portrait of Pope Innocent X.

Innocent X has been described as irritable in his later years. In March 1654, Innocent X suddenly expelled his personal physician of eight years, Gabriel da Fonseca, after Fonseca defended a barber who had bled the Pope. Fonseca claims he had been in service to the Pamphili family for over two decades, and that the Pope had regarded him not only as his physician but also as a private advisor.

== Relationship with Olimpia Maidalchini ==
Olimpia Maidalchini was married to Innocent X's late brother, and was believed to be his mistress because of her influence over him in matters of promotion and politics. This state of affairs was alluded to in the Encyclopædia Britannica 9th edition (1880):

"Throughout his reign the influence exercised over him by Maidalchini, his deceased brother's wife, was very great, and such as to give rise to gross scandal, for which, however, there appears to have been no adequate ground.... The avarice of his female counsellor gave to his reign a tone of oppression and sordid greed which probably it would not otherwise have shown, for personally he was not without noble and reforming impulses."

German historian Leopold von Ranke concluded that she was not Innocent X's lover.

== Death and legacy ==
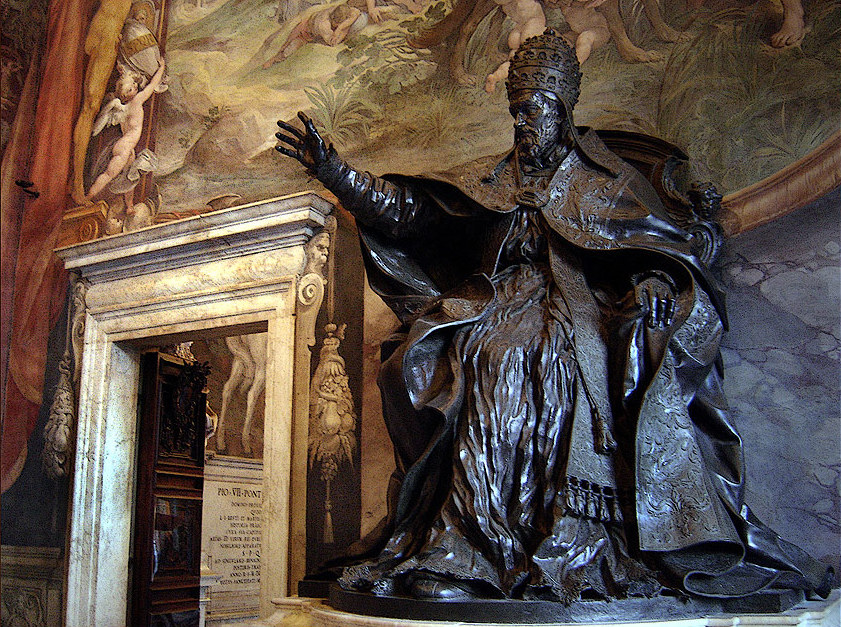
Bronze statue of Innocent X from 1645 to 1649, by Alessandro Algardi.

In his later years, Innocent X suffered from gout, causing him intense pain and severely restricting his movements. The eighty-year-old pontiff's health began to decline in August 1654. By the evening of 26 December his condition had deteriorated to the extent that the family was summoned.

On 27 December, he blessed his nephew, niece, and their children, and then had a brief meeting with Cardinals Flavio Chigi and Decio Azzolino. That night he had a little rest, though his condition did not improve.

On 28 December, Innocent X received the Last rites and expressed his desire to take leave of the cardinals. In anticipation of the Pope's expected death many of the cardinals had already gathered in Rome in advance of a subsequent conclave. Thirty-nine gathered at his bedside at the Quirinal Palace.

On 1 January 1655, Mass was celebrated at the pope's bedside, and the same was done on 6 January, when Innocent X also received the Viaticum for the last time. Secretary of State Chigi, who had been in attendance during the last twelve days, Prefect of the Sacred Palace Bishop Scotti, and Sacristan Monsignor Altini, as well as, various attendants were present when the Pope died on the night of 6 January 1655.

The Swiss Guard escorted Papal Camerlengo Cardinal Antonio Barberini to the Quirinal to perform the requisite rituals and Cardinal de' Medici visited with the Pope's three nephews, who were in another room. After an autopsy, the body was embalmed and the next day taken to the Vatican where it was placed on a catafalque in the Sistine Chapel. On 8 January it was transferred to St. Peter's Basilica, where the sealing of the coffin was witnessed by Cardinals Niccolò Albergati-Ludovisi, Fabio Chigi, Luigi Omodei, Pietro Vito Ottoboni, Marcello Santacroce, Baccio Aldobrandini, Cristoforo Vidman, Lorenzo Raggi, Carlo Pio di Savoia and Gualtieri, Princes Pamphili, Ludovisi and Giustiniani, and the Master of Ceremonies Fulvio Servantio. A funeral was held on 17 January. Innocent's tomb is located in the Church of Sant'Agnese in Agone which he had built in 1652 adjacent to the family palace, the Palazzo Pamphili, in Rome.

Innocent X was succeeded by Pope Alexander VII who had promised Innocent X that he would build more schools in Europe.

== See also ==
- Cardinals created by Innocent X
- Pamphili, with Innocent X's family tree
- Portrait of Innocent X
- Study after Velázquez's Portrait of Pope Innocent X

== Sources ==
- Collier, Theodore Freylinghuysen (1911). "Innocent/Innocent X" . In Chisholm, Hugh (ed.). Encyclopædia Britannica. Vol. 14 (11th ed.). Cambridge University Press. p. 582.
- Ott, Michael (1910). "Pope Innocent X" . In Herbermann, Charles (ed.). Catholic Encyclopedia. Vol. 08. New York: Robert Appleton Company.

Catholic Church titles
Preceded by Luigi Caetani	— TITULAR — Latin Patriarch of Antioch; 1626–1629	Succeeded by Cesare Monti
Preceded by Urban VIII	Pope; 15 September 1644 – 7 January 1655	Succeeded by Alexander VII
