= Biblioteca Spezioli, Fermo =

Coordinates: 43.1616°N 13.7179°E

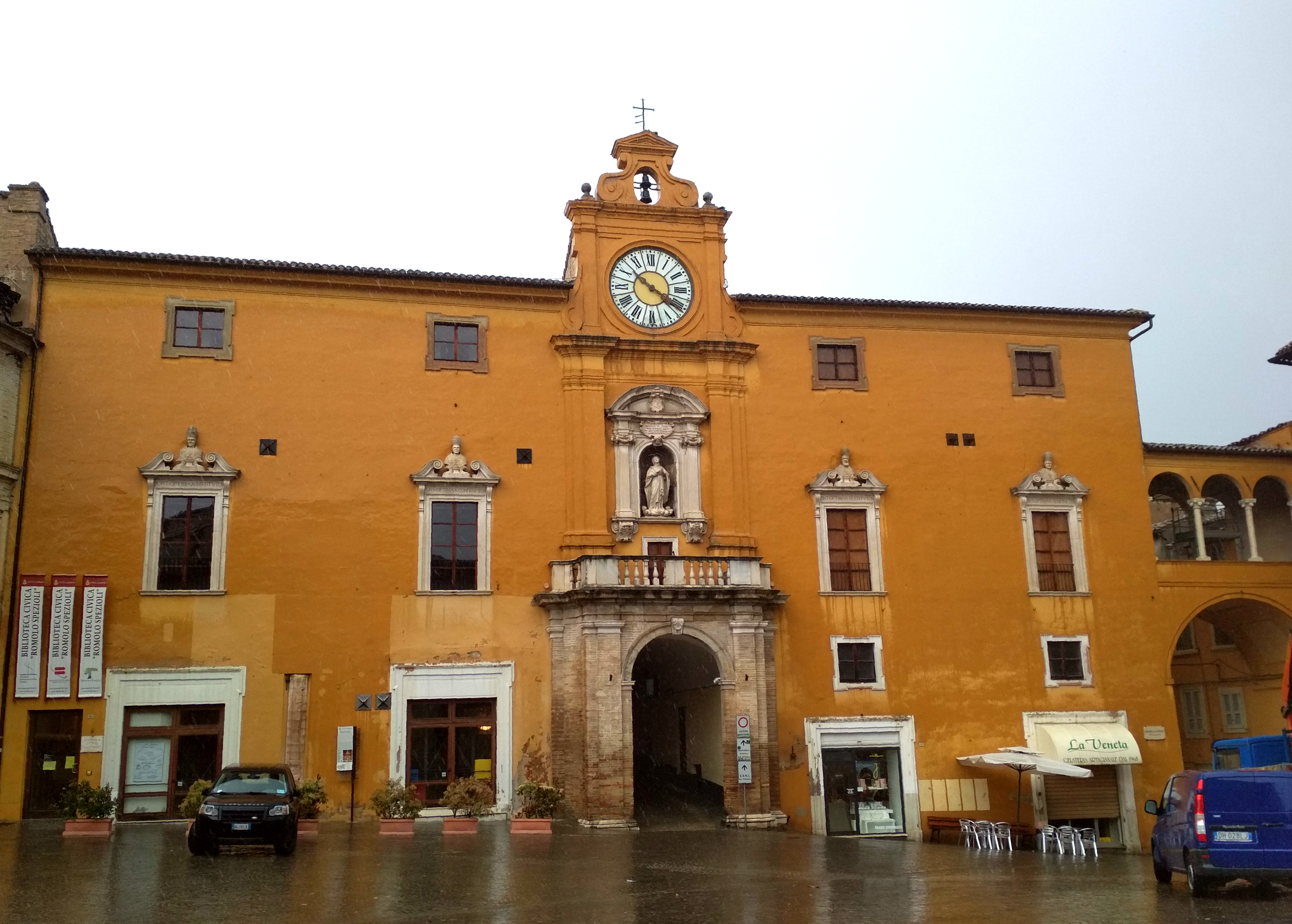
Civic Library of Fermo

The Biblioteca Civica Romolo Spezioli or Biblioteca Civica di Fermo is a public library located on the Piazza del Popolo in the town center of Fermo, region of Marche, Italy.

== History ==
The library was founded in 1688 with the initial bequest of Romolo Spezioli, native of Fermo and physician to Christina, Queen of Sweden, and friend of the prominent Cardinal Decio Azzolino. The collection was much enlarged in the 19th century by the acquisition of libraries from suppressed religious institutions and the donation of the brothers Raffaele and Gaetano De Minicis.

Further donations over the last century enlarged the collections, now housed in the Palazzo dei Priori and the adjacent building and now holds nearly 30,000 volumes, including 127 parchment codices, 11 corali, 3,000 manuscripts, 681 incunables, 15,000 fifteeners, 23,000 opuscula; and 816 journal collections out of print. The library also has collections of prints and designs, many donated by the architect Giovanni Battista Carducci (1806-1878). The core of the ethnographic collection was donated by "Silvio Zavatti" and a natural history collection was donated by "Tommaso Salvadori" of Villa Vitali.

Part of the historic collection is in the adjacent Palazzo dei Priori and its Sala del Mappamondo (Hall of the World Map), completed in 1688 by Adamo Sacripante on commission of the local Cardinal Decio Azzolino.
