= Maggiori =

Maggiori is a surname. Notable people with the surname include:

- Alessandro Maggiori (1764–1834), Italian art collector and critic
- Mark Maggiori (born 1977), French-American painter, graphic designer, draftsman, musician, music video director, and vocalist
