= Palazzo dei Priori, Fermo =

Coordinates: 43°09′43″N 13°43′06″E

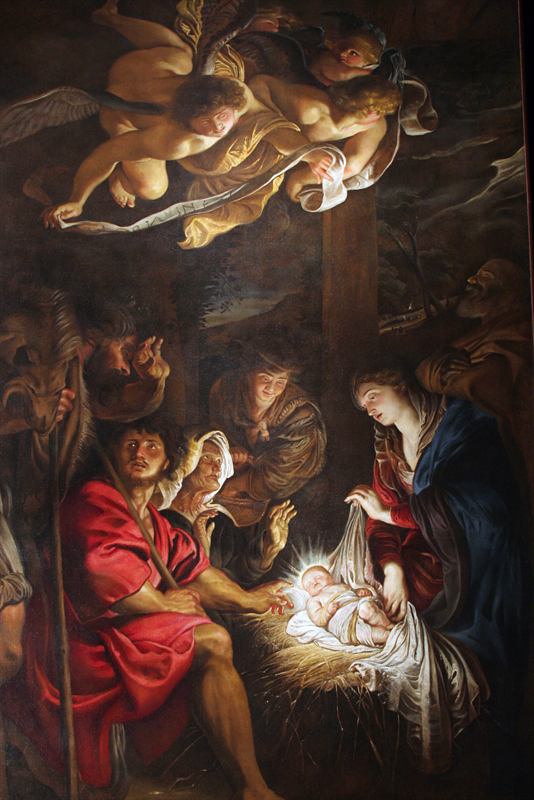
Adoration of the Shepherds by Rubens

The Palazzo dei Priori is a medieval-Renaissance palace in center of the town of Fermo, region of Marche, Italy. The palace houses the civic art and archeologic museums.

== History ==
The palace was begun in 1296, functioning as a municipal office (city hall). It underwent reconstructions, lastly in 1525, when the dual staircase in the facade was built leading to a portal atop which stand a large bronze statue of a seated Pope Sixtus V in the act of benediction. The statue was sculpted by Accursio Baldi.

Starting in 1890, the city library was installed on the premises. In 1981, it became the home of the town picture gallery (pinacoteca). The collection also displays cultural items made and linked to Fermo. Among the artists featured are Andrea da Bologna, Francescuccio di Cecco Ghissi, Jacobello del Fiore (Life of Santa Lucia), Vittore Crivelli ( Crucifixion), Vincenzo Pagani, Giuliano Presutti, Giovanni Lanfranco (Pentecost), and Peter Paul Rubens (Adoration of the Shepherds, 1608).

The palace has a Sala del Mappamondo (Hall of the World Map), completed in 1688 by Adamo Sacripante on commission of the local Cardinal Decio Azzolino. The world map (globe) was completed in 1713 by the geographer Silvestro Amanzio Maroncelli. The room and its collection of ancient books and manuscripts was the nucleus of the 17th century collection started by the Cardinal with the help of his friend, Christina, Queen of Sweden. It is now part of the larger collection of the Biblioteca Spezioli, housed in this palace and the adjacent building.

== Gallery ==
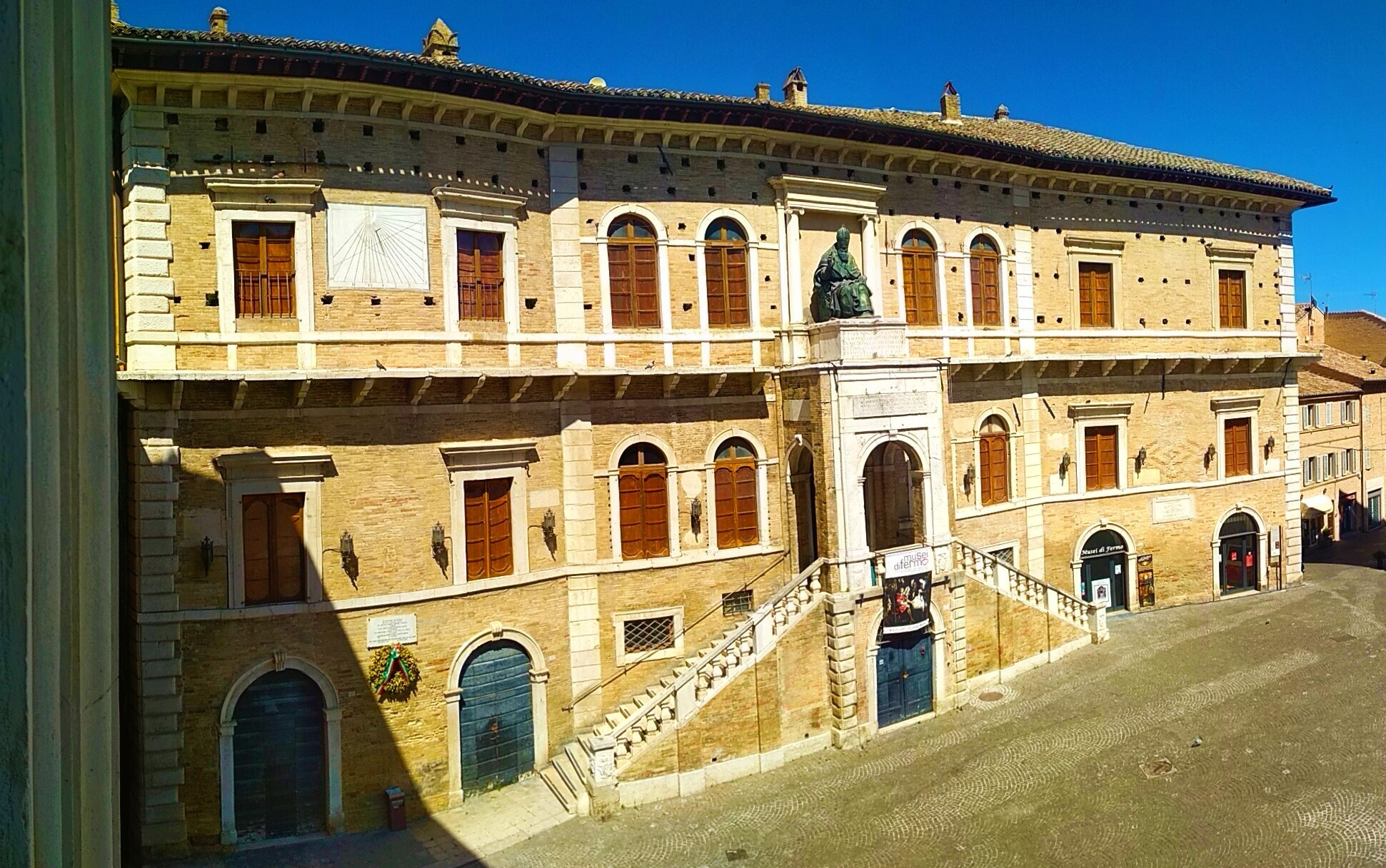
The facade

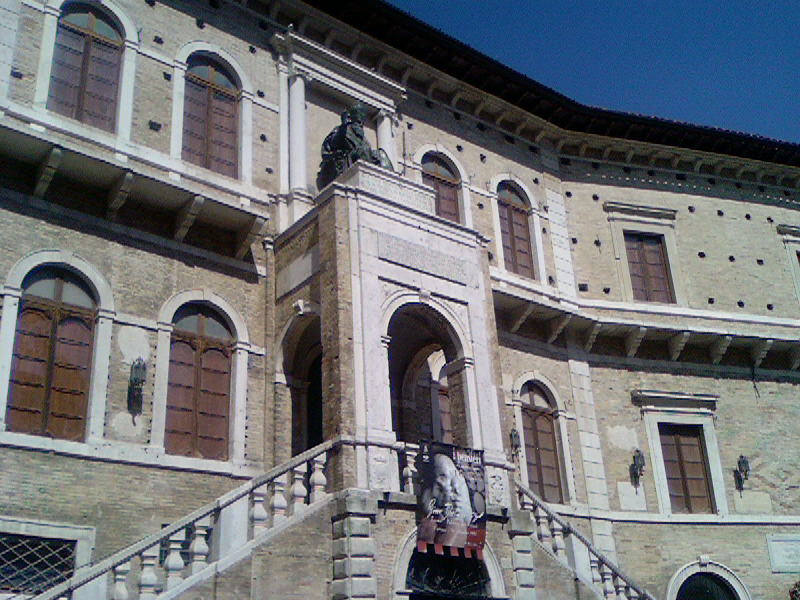
Portal with papal statue
