= Romolo Spezioli =

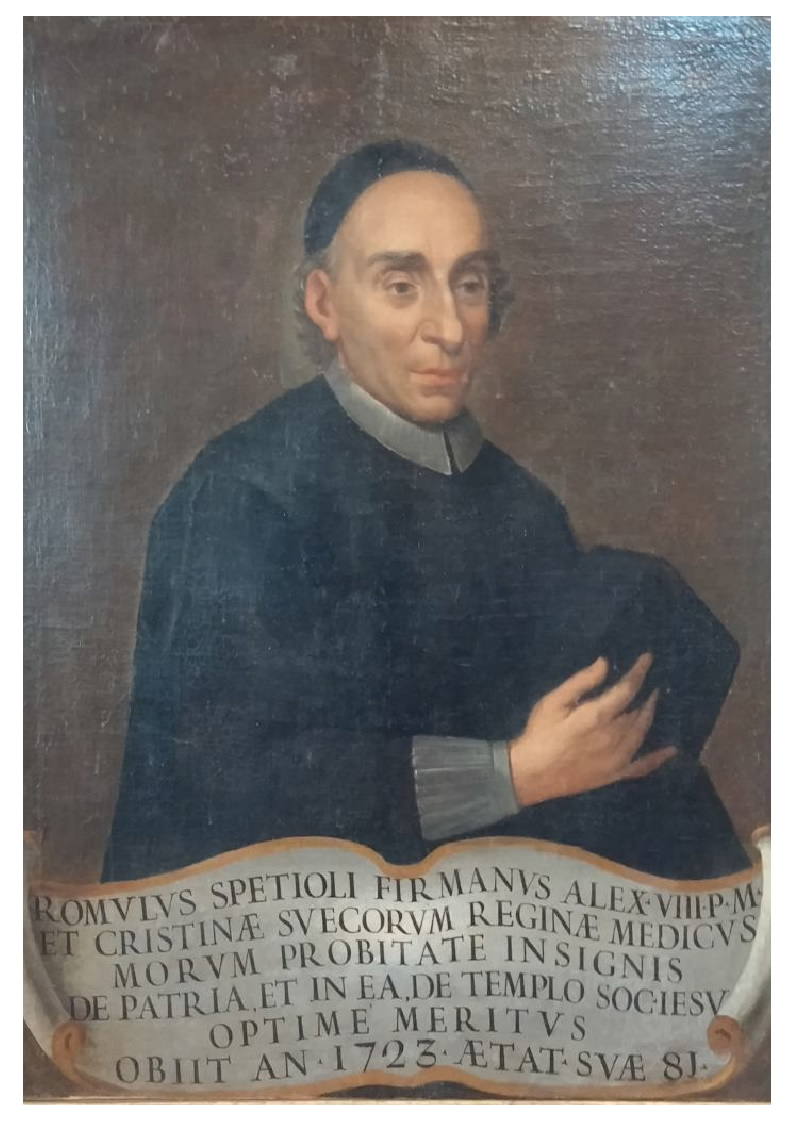
Romolo Spezioli

Romolo Spezioli (1642, in Fermo – 1723, in Rome) was an Italian doctor and the personal physician of the Ottoboni family, Queen Christina of Sweden, Cardinal Decio Azzolino and of Pope Alexander VIII.

== Life ==
After studies initiated in Fermo, graduating in 1664, he worked for a short period nearby Grottammare, Ripatransone and Jesi.

He taught practical medicine at La Sapienza from 1675 until 1722, a year before his death.

He was responsible for the important donation of books still preserved in the Library of Spezioli, Fermo. The donation consists of approximately 12,000 volumes of medical works, geography textbooks, cosmography, alchemy, physiognomy, botany and culinary. The library was opened to students in 1688.
