= Adoration of the Shepherds (Rubens) =

Painting by Peter Paul Rubens

The Adoration of the Shepherds
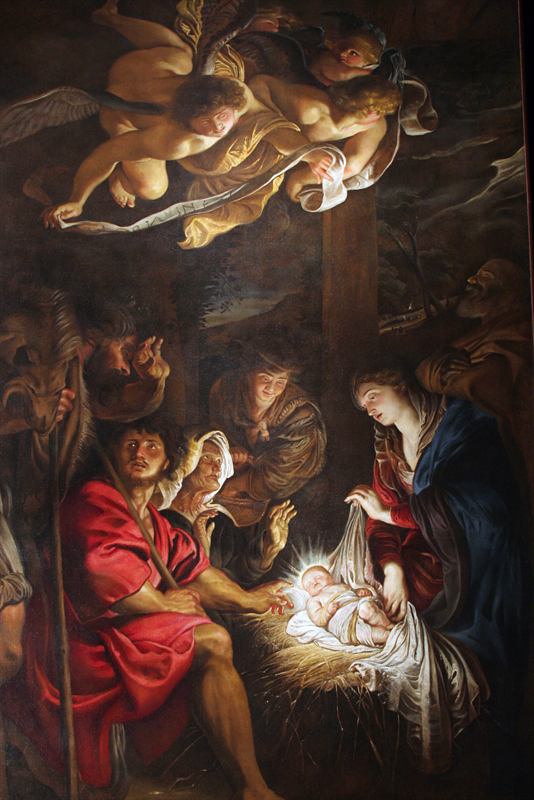
- Artist: Peter Paul Rubens
- Year: 1608
- Medium: Oil on panel
- Dimensions: 300 cm × 192 cm (120 in × 76 in)
- Location: Pinacoteca civica, Fermo

Adoration of the Shepherds is an oil on canvas painting dating to 1608, painted by Peter Paul Rubens. It is now in the Pinacoteca civica in Fermo, Italy. It was rediscovered at the start of the twentieth century by the art historian Roberto Longhi, who identified it with the painting recorded as La notte in 1607.

Produced in around three months for the church of saint Philip Neri in Fermo, its chiaroscuro is in the style of Caravaggio, who Rubens had got to know in Rome during the Flemish painter's ten years' study in Italy. The painting is also heavily influenced by Correggio's La Notte.

It shows the shepherds reaching the stable of the Nativity, with the Virgin Mary showing the baby Jesus to the shepherds, four swirling angels holding up a scroll announcing Jesus's birth and with St Joseph, two female figures and two male figures in the left background. It has recently been suggested that the elderly female figure can be identified with the disbelieving midwife of the Gospel of James, raising her hands to heaven as she is cured.
