= Marcellino da Capradosso =

Italian, Servant of God

Venerable Marcellino da Capradosso O.F.M. Cap.
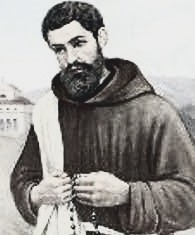
- Born: 22 September 1873; Capradosso, Marche, Italy
- Died: 26 February 1909 (aged 35); Fermo, Marche, Italy
- Venerated in: Catholic Church
- Feast: February 26
- Patronage: Franciscan Order of Friars Minor Capuchin

Marcellino da Capradosso (22 September 1873 – 26 February 1909), religiously known as Giovanni Maoloni, was an Italian Venerable Servant of God and a lay member of the Franciscan Capuchin order.

== Life and death ==
Born in Capradosso on 22 September 1873, he spent his childhood working at school and on the field. In 1902, despite his disapproving relatives, he joined the Order of Friars Minor Capuchin in Fossombrone, where he would receive the name Marcellino da Capradosso. He was later assigned to the friary in Fermo to work on various miscellaneous tasks. He later would care for his fellow brother in the Church who suffered from tuberculosis for six months. Shortly after caring for him, Marcellino da Capradosso would ask to go on a mission to Brazil, though shortly after he would fall ill to tubercular peritonitis. On 24 August 1908, he was hospitalised in Fermo, later undergoing a failed operation; unable to stand, he was bedridden for two months. He was later discharged to die in the convent in Fermo on 26 February 1909.

He experienced visions of Mary and had troubles with the devil.

== Veneration ==
He was declared venerable by Pope Francis, for heroic virtues on 8 November 2017.
