= San Michele Arcangelo, Fermo =

Church in Fermo, Marche, Italy

Coordinates: 43.159987°N 13.720908°E

San Michele Arcangelo is a baroque-style Roman Catholic church located on Largo Vinci #3 in Fermo, province of Fermo, in the region of Marche, Italy.

== History ==
A church at the site with the Sant’Angelo in Pila, was present by 1251, and became a Collegiate church in 1621. The church was refurbished and expanded in 1591. The ceiling was decorated with cassettoni in 1608. In 1820, a further refurbishment under the architect Paglialunga was performed. In 1942, it acquired a travertine marble staircase.

The entrance portal (1326) was sculpted by Raimondo di Poggio, and includes a statue of St Michael. The bell-tower, 47 meters tall, dates to 1368. The church has two naves, one ending in an altar dedicated to St Michael, the other, to St John the Baptist. The nave of St Michael has a wooden statue of the Angel, and the 15th-century tomb of Bishop Amico Buonamicizia. Behind the main altar is a carved 17th-century wooden choir.

The interiors were decorated in the 19th century by Giuseppe Toscani and Riccardo Maranesi. Among the works is the main altarpiece depicting St Michael defeats Satan by Giacinto Brandi. In the first altar on the right is a canvas depicting the Death of San Gaetano by Alessandro Ricci, a follower of Carlo Maratta. The second altar on the right has an Annunciation adjacent to baroque baptismal font. The church organ (1858) was built by Vincenzo Paci of Ascoli Piceno.
