= San Martino, Fermo =

Deconsecrated church in Fermo, Marche, Italy

Coordinates: 43.161970°N 13.719260°E

San Martino is a baroque-style, deconsecrated Roman Catholic church located in Via Giacomo Leopardi in Fermo, province of Fermo, in the region of Marche, Italy.

== History ==
The church was erected in 1649 at the site of a prior church, San Salvatore. In 1682, it was assigned to the Jesuit order, which had arrived in Fermo in 1609, and retitled Chiesa del Gesù. The facade remains incomplete, but the interior is richly decorated with polychrome marble. The main altar designed by Domenico Egidi, houses a canvas depicting the Circumcision (1670) by Giovanni Peruzzini, who also painted a canvas depicting Sant’Ignazio for the church. The church organ was constructed by Gaetano Callido in 1763. Since 1994, it houses an auditorium for the city.
