= Alessandro Maggiori =

Italian noble

- Count
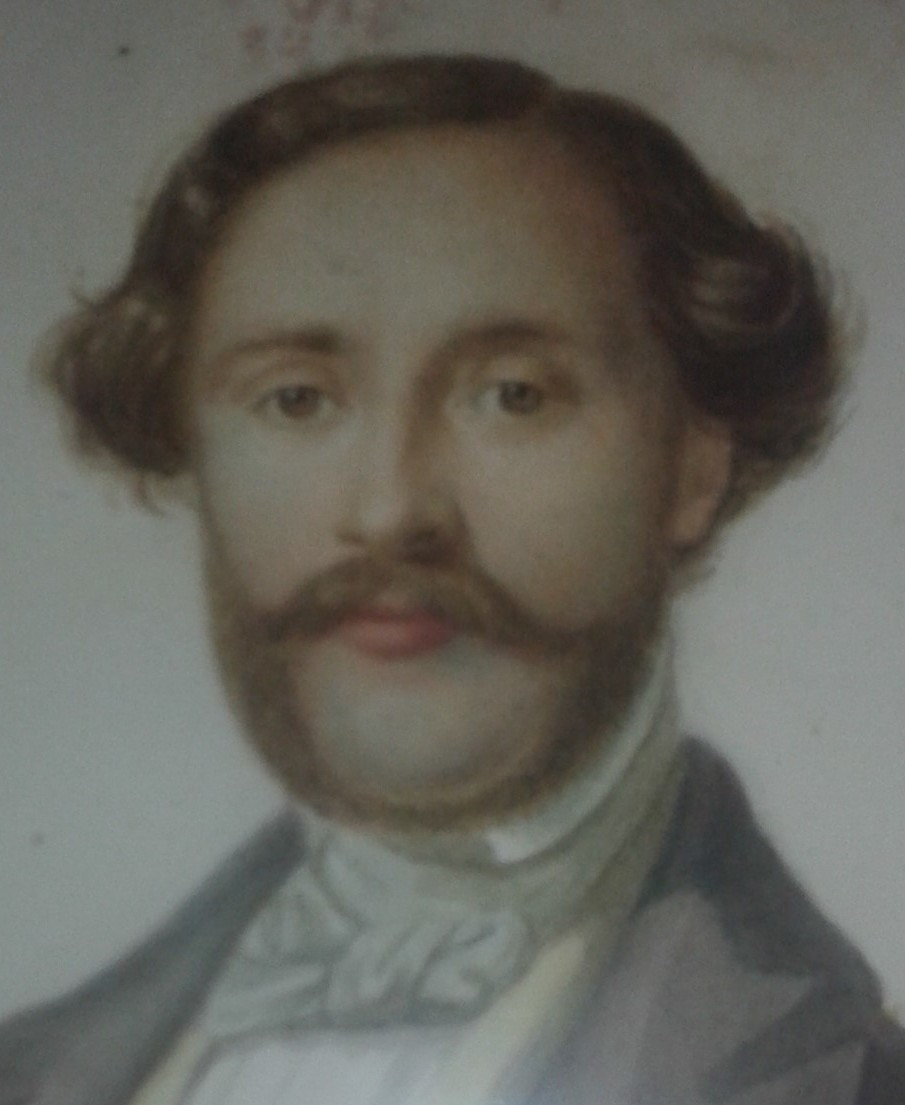
- Successor: Lorenzo Maggiori
- Born: 1764; Palazzo Maggiori Fermo, Stato pontificio, Italia
- Died: 1834 (aged 69–70); The Castellano Manor Sant'Elpidio a Mare, Stato pontificio, Italia
- Spouse: Countess Giuseppina Bonafede of Monte San Giusto
- Father: Annibale Maggiori
- Mother: Countess Anna Rosa Sciarra

Alessandro Maggiori (30 January 1764 – 1834) was one of the most important collectors of old drawings of the greatest masters in the 19th century.

Maggiori was born in Fermo to count Annibale Maggiori (1731-1809) and countess Anna Rosa Sciarra (1747-1815), in their historic family house.

He began his studies at the College Campana of Osimo where among his classmates was Annibale della Genga, who was to become Pope Leo XII. He continued his studies at the prestigious college Montalto in Bologna where he began to cultivate his passion for art. After completing his legal studies at the University of Bologna, he worked with the famous jurist Cavalier Luigi Salina alternating his work as a lawyer with the study of the fine arts which became a passion for collecting, making it one of the predominant collections in Italy in the nineteenth century.

Maggiori moved to Rome in 1798, where he exploited the teachings of Domenico Corvi after which he lived in Fermo and retired in Sant'Elpidio a Mare, in the hunting lodge known as "The Castellano Mansion".

Maggiori was a proponent of liberal orientation. He published several works on the basis of a criterion of utility, including several treatises on agronomy and the first modern edition of the Rime commented by Michelangelo Buonarroti (1817), The Dialogue around the life and work of architect Sebastiano Serlio of Bologna (1824), The artistic guide of the city of Ancona and Loreto (1832), and indications of the stranger paintings, sculptures, architecture and other features which can be seen today inside the sacrosanct basilica of Loreto and other parts of the city (1824) and the proverbs and sayings collection sententious (1833).

He was an art critic (published criticism to the works of Roman artists in the newspaper Il Capriccio) and was a collector of antique designs, which at his death, in 1834, were collected in the "Center Alessandro Maggiori".
