= Decio Azzolino =

Italian Catholic Cardinal, code-breaker and investigator

His Eminence Decio Azzolino
- Cardinal Secretary of State
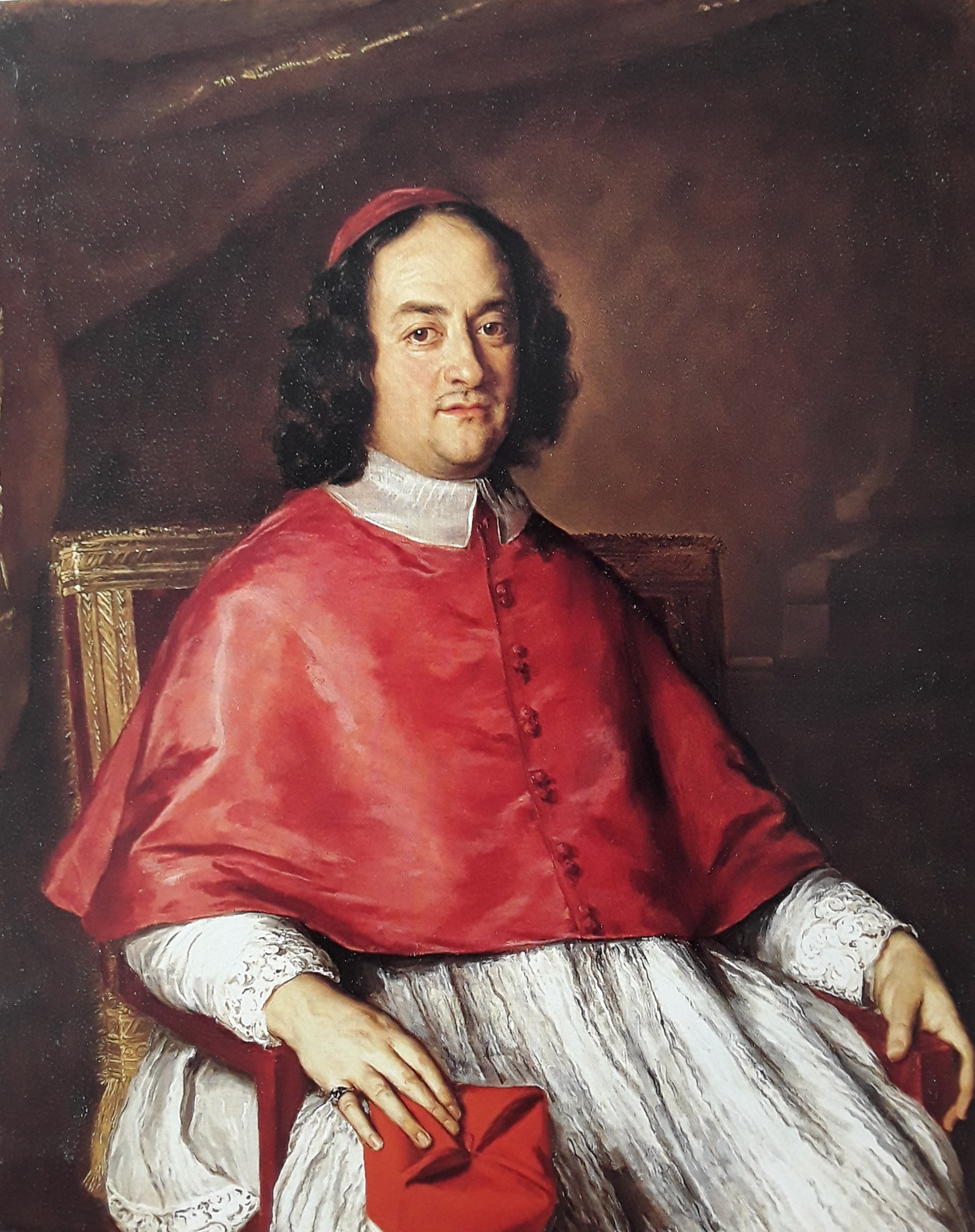
- Portrait by Jacob Ferdinand Voet, c. 1670
- Church: Catholic Church
- Appointed: 25 June 1667
- Term ended: 9 December 1669
- Predecessor: Giulio Rospigliosi
- Successor: Federico Borromeo
- Previous posts: Cardinal-Deacon of Sant'Adriano al Foro (1654–1668)

Orders
- Created cardinal: 2 March 1654 by Pope Innocent X
- Rank: Cardinal-Priest

Personal details
- Born: 11 April 1623 Fermo, Italy
- Died: 8 June 1689 (aged 66) Rome, Papal States
- Buried: Santa Maria in Vallicella
- Coat of arms: Decio Azzolino's coat of arms

Decio Azzolino (11 April 1623 – 8 June 1689) was an Italian Catholic Cardinal, code-breaker, investigator and leader of the Squadrone Volante.

== Early life ==
Azzolino was born at Fermo, the son of Pompeo Azzolino and Giulia Ruffo. He was the great-nephew of Cardinal Decio Azzolino, the elder, and is thus often referred to as Cardinal Decio Azzolino, the younger.

He received doctorates in philosophy, law and theology from the University of Fermo. On 18 January 1642, Pope Urban VIII named Bishop Giovanni Giacomo Panciroli nuncio extraordinary to Spain. Azzolino followed Panciroli to Madrid, and in 1644 when Pope Innocent X appointed Panciroli as secretary of state, he began assisting him in the secretariat. When Panciroli died in September 1651, Azzolino managed the secretariat until the return of Bishop Fabio Chigi from Germany. Chigi was named secretary of state in December.

== As an agent of Donna Olimpia ==
Coat of arms of Decio Azzolino

Azzolino was a skilled cryptographer, responsible for cracking ciphers used in correspondence. He was also an able investigator. When the Kingdom of Naples was made aware of invasion plans by Henry II, Duke of Guise, it was Azzolino who (in February 1654) concluded that the breach must have come from Camillo Astalli, the Pope's Cardinal-Nephew. Though likely accurate, his conclusion was convenient - Astalli was a rival for power to Olimpia Maidalchini, Azzolino's own patron. Contemporary John Bargrave noted that there were plenty of spies within the Vatican but that none excelled at the task more than Azzolino.

== Cardinalate ==
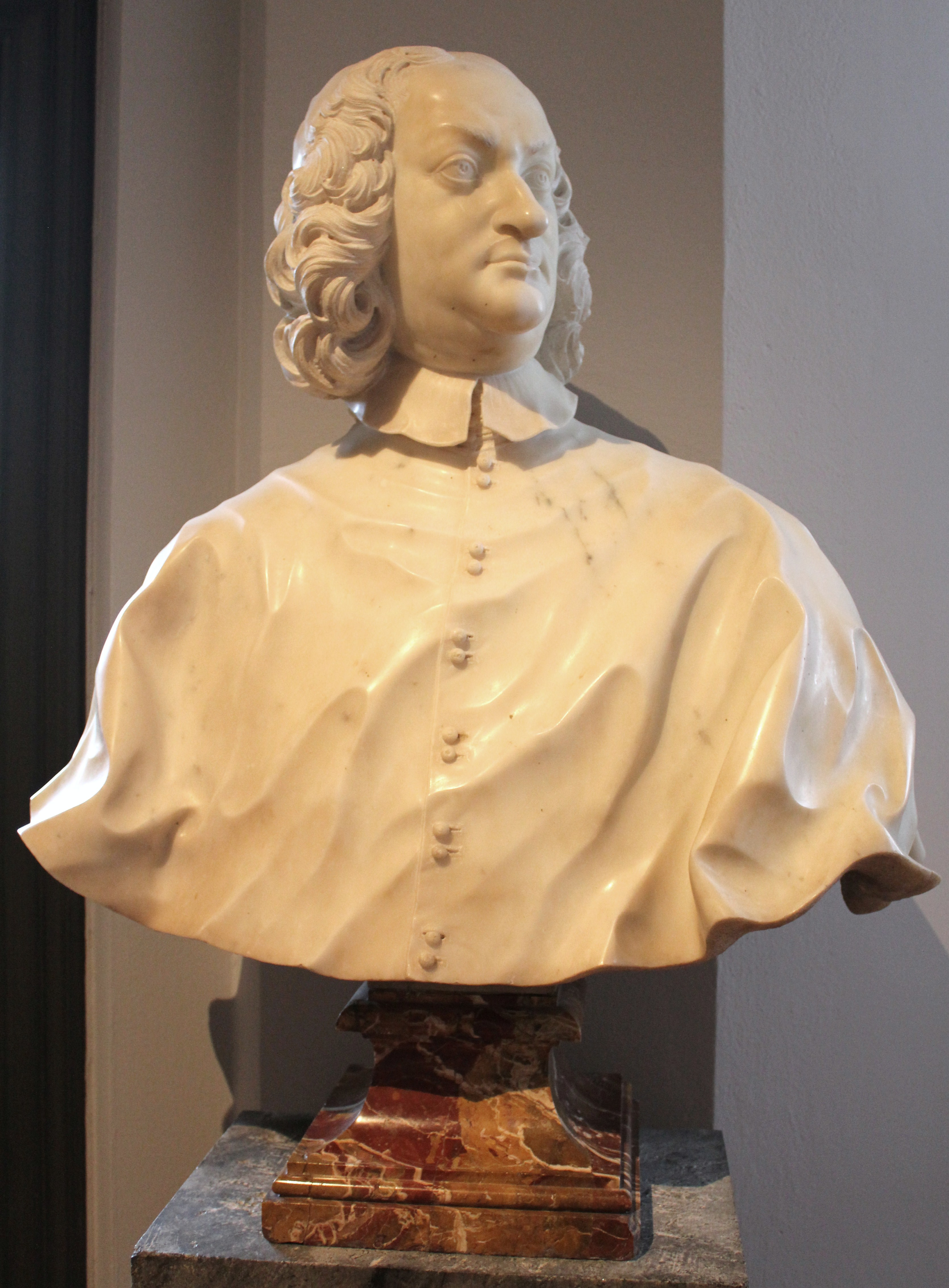
Decio Azzolino in 1670 by Pietro Balestra

Later in 1654, because of this service he rendered to the pope, Azzolino was elevated to cardinal and was made cardinal-priest of the church of Sant'Adriano al Foro (Curia Julia) in Rome.

He participated in the papal conclave of 1655 which elected Pope Alexander VII. Azzolino was the leader of the independent liberal movement Squadrone Volante, which played a role in engineering the result of the conclave in favour of an anti-nepotism candidate. Azzolino's Squadrone also is thought to have engineered the election of Giulio Rospigliosi as Pope Clement IX at the papal conclave of 1667. Rospigliosi, who had been cardinal secretary of state, rewarded Azzolino by immediately (on the night of his election, in fact) appointing him to the position, giving further credence to the rumour.

== Azzolino and Christina ==
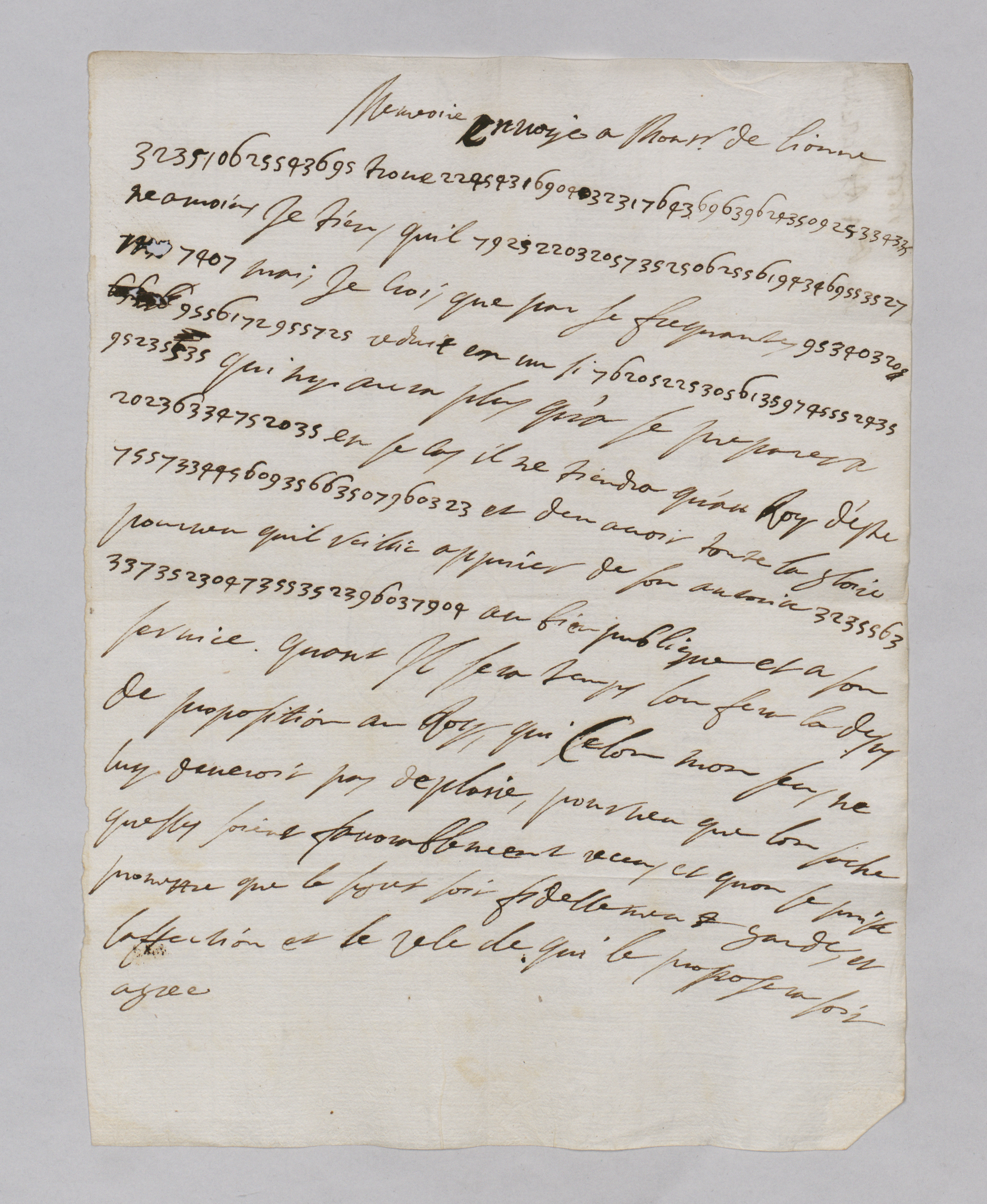
Letter from Queen Christina to Decio Azzolino in the National Archives of Sweden See Wikimedia Commons for others

Azzolino was appointed Queen Christina of Sweden's representative within the Catholic Church. It is certain he looked after her financial businesses. Some have speculated that he and Christina were in love with one another.

There were speculations and suspicion as early as 1656. As correspondence uncovered between Azzolino and Pope Alexander VII wherein Azzolino must explain his "long and frequent visits to the Queen," and their letters to one another.

In July 1659, Christina moved to Trastevere to live in Palazzo Riario, on top of the Janiculus, designed by Bramante. It was Cardinal Azzolino who signed the contract as well as provided her with new servants to replace Francesco Maria Santinelli, who had been Gian Monaldeschi's executioner. Azzolino proved to Christina that Santinelli had been deceiving her and stealing her money. Importantly, Azzolino also ensured that she was reconciled with the pope, who was furious at Christina, and that the he granted her a pension.

Portrait of Decio Azzolino (1623-1689)

Christina wrote him many letters during her travels. On 26 January 1667, Christina wrote (in French) that she never would offend God or give Azzolino reason to take offence, but this "does not prevent me from loving you until death, and since piety relieves you from being my lover, then I relieve you from being my servant, for I shall live and die as your slave". Maintaining celibacy, his replies were more reserved.

In 1675, he suggested to Christina to appoint Romolo Spezioli, also from Fermo, like Cesare Machiati, as her physician. Azzolino also introduced her to Miguel Molinos. In her basement there was a laboratory, where she, Giuseppe Francesco Borri and Azzolino experimented with alchemy. Cardinal Azzolino stayed at her side until she died on 19 April 1689.

Azzolino burnt most of their correspondence; about 80 letters have survived. Some details were written in a code that was decrypted by Carl Bildt in Rome around 1900. Azzolino inherited her important art collection, including Correggio's Danaë and two versions of Titian's Venus and Adonis (probably the "Lausanne" and Getty versions). Azzolino died a few weeks later and is buried in the oratorium of the Church of Santa Maria in Vallicella. His nephew Pompeo Azzolino was his sole heir, and he rapidly sold off Christina's art collections, much of which later formed the core of the Orleans Collection.
