= Fermo =

- Comune
- Città di Fermo
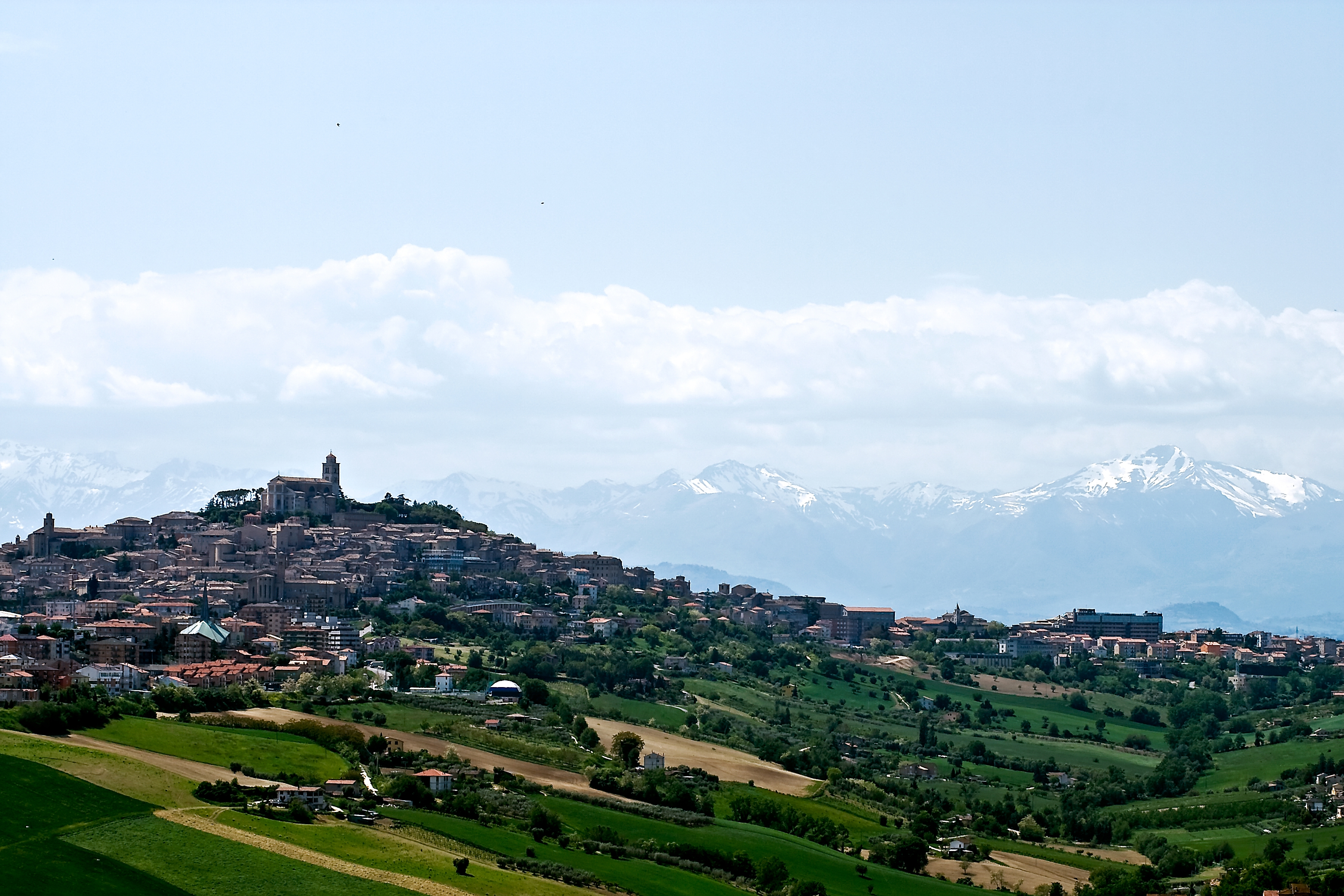
- Panorama of Fermo

- Flag Coat of arms

- Fermo within the Province of Fermo

- Location within Italy Location within Marche
- Coordinates: 43°09′39″N 13°42′57″E
- Country: Italy
- Region: Marche
- Province: Fermo (FM)
- Frazioni: see list

Government
  - Mayor: Alberto Scarfini

Area
  - Total: 124 km^{2} (48 sq mi)
- Elevation: 319 m (1,047 ft)

Population (30 June 2015)
  - Total: 37,732
  - Density: 304/km^{2} (788/sq mi)
- Demonym: Fermani
- Time zone: UTC+1 (CET)
  - Summer (DST): UTC+2 (CEST)
- Postal code: 63900
- Dialing code: 0734
- Patron saint: St. Maria Assunta
- Saint day: August 15
- Website: Official website

Fermo (Italian: [ˈfermo]; ancient: Firmum Picenum) is a town and comune of the Marche, Italy, in the Province of Fermo.

Fermo is on a hill, the Sabulo, elevation 319 metres (1,047 ft), on a branch from Porto San Giorgio on the Adriatic coast railway.

== History ==
The oldest human remains from the area are funerary remains from the 9th–8th centuries BC, belonging to the Villanovan culture or the proto-Etruscan civilization.

The ancient Firmum Picenum was founded as a Latin colony, consisting of 6000 men, in 264 BC, after the conquest of the Picentes, as the local headquarters of the Roman power, to which it remained faithful. It was originally governed by five quaestors. It was made a colony with full rights after the battle of Philippi, the 4th Legion being settled there. It lay at the junction of roads to Pausulae, Urbs Salvia, and Asculum, connected to the coast road by a short branch road from Castellum Firmanum (Porto S. Giorgio). According to Plutarch's Parallel Lives, Cato the Elder thought highly of Firman soldiers for their faith and readiness.

With the Pentapolis, in the 8th century, it passed under the authority of the Holy See and was thenceforth subject to the vicissitudes of the March of Ancona. In the 10th century it became the capital of the Marchia Firmana. Under the predecessors of Honorius III (1216–27), the bishops of the city became prince-bishops, first with the secular rights of counts, and later as princes of Fermo.

In 1199, it became a free city, and remained independent until 1550, when it was annexed to the Papal States.

In the contest between the Hohenstaufen and the papacy, Fermo was besieged and captured several times; in 1176 by Archbishop Christian of Mainz, in 1192 by Emperor Henry Vl, in 1208 by Marcuald, Duke of Ravenna, in 1241 by Emperor Frederick II, and in 1245 by Manfred of Sicily. After this it was governed by different lords, who ruled as more or less legitimate vassals of the Holy See, e.g. the Monteverdi, Giovanni Visconti and Francesco Sforza (banished 1446), Oliverotto Euffreducci (murdered in 1503 by Cesare Borgia), who was succeeded by his son Ludovico, killed at the battle of Montegiorgio in 1520, when Fermo became again directly subjected to the Holy See.

Fermo has been the capital city of the new province of Fermo since 2009.

== Main sights ==
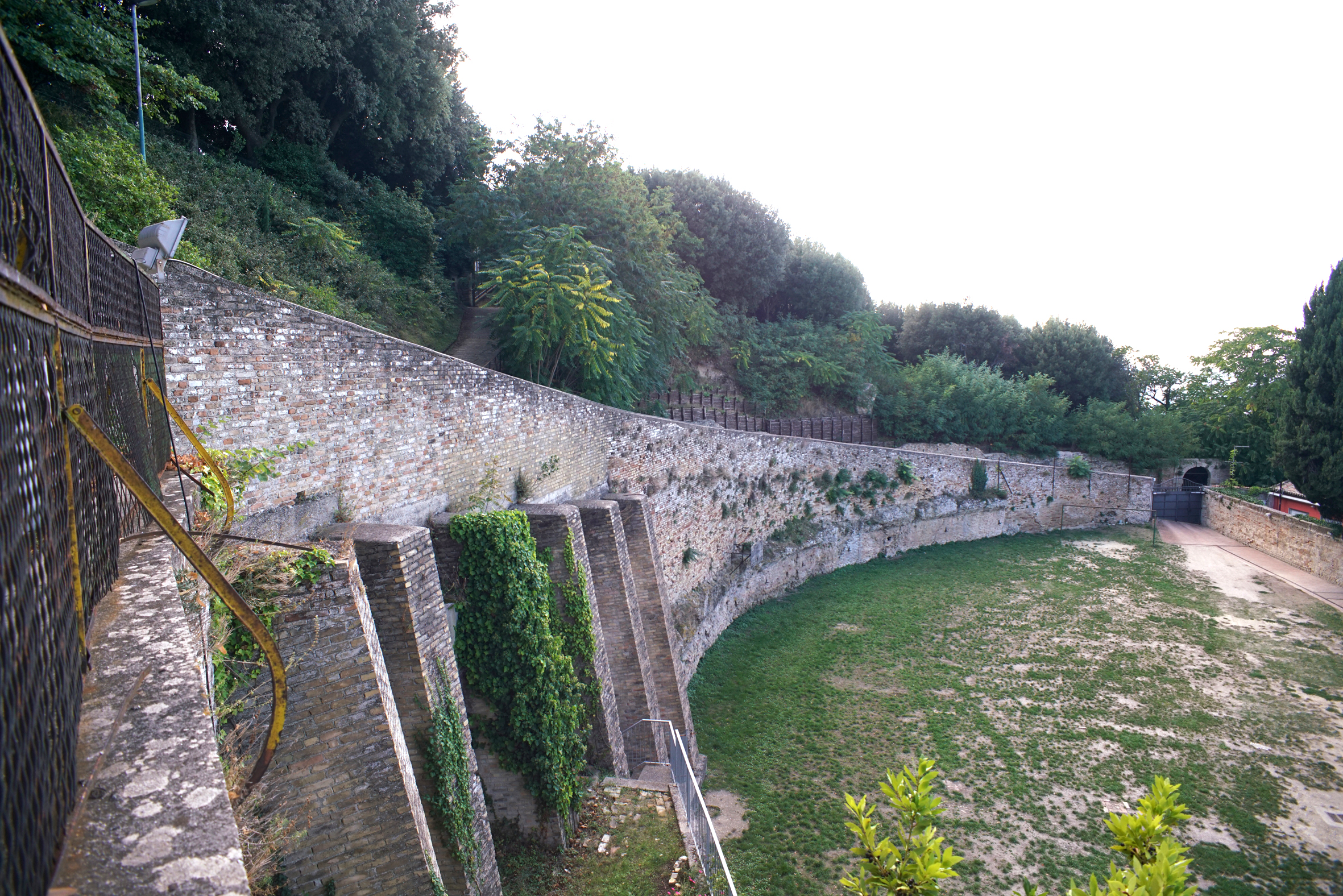
Roman Theatre

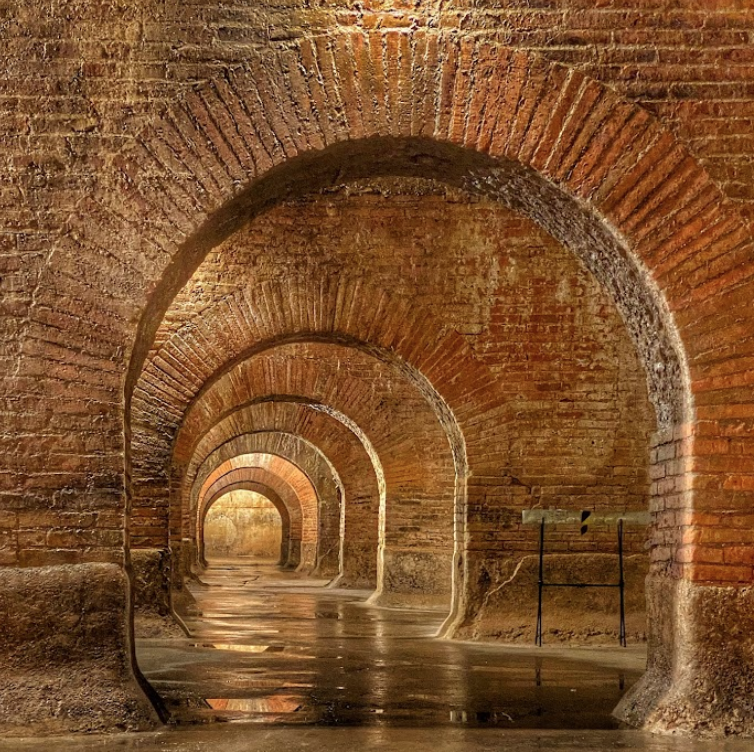
Roman Cistern

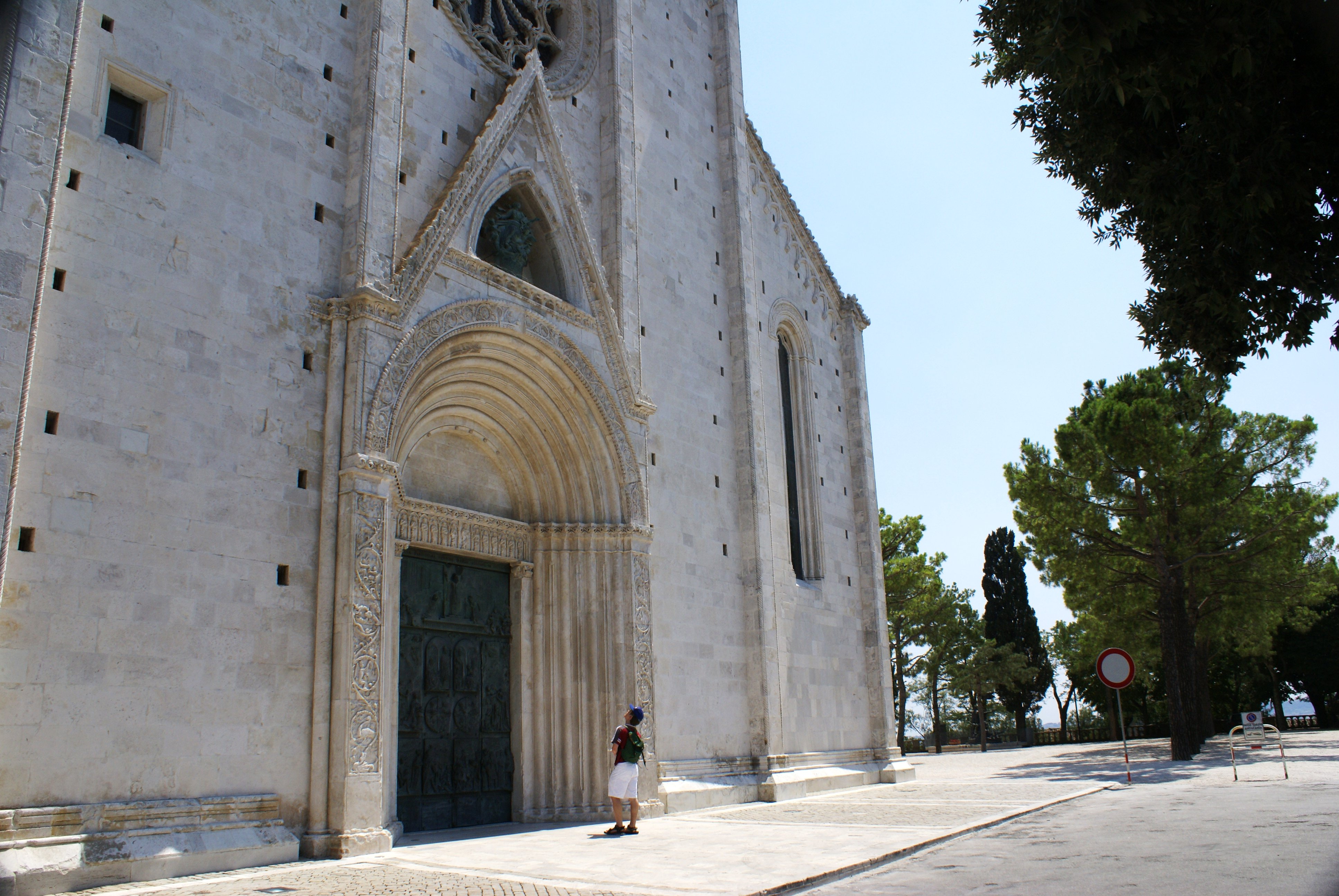
The cathedral of Fermo

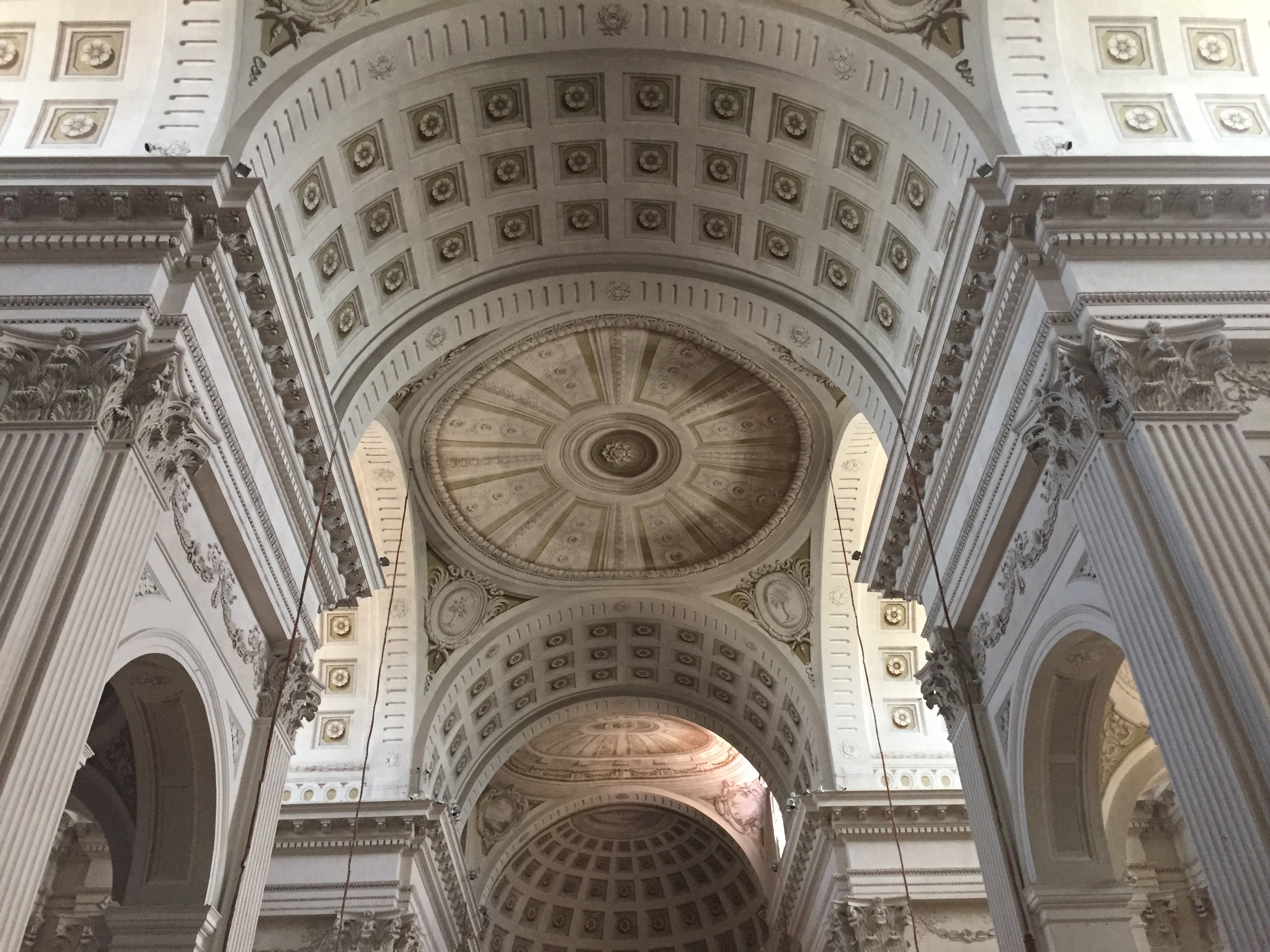
Interior of the cathedral

=== Archaeological sites ===
In the outskirts of Fermo, three large necropolises have been identified and partially excavated: in contrada Mossa towards the east, in contrada Misericordia and Solfonara towards the west. The most significant period of reference of these necropolises is the proto-Villanovan one (from IX to VII century B.C.). The areas have been covered, and the findings are largely exposed to the National Archaeological Museum of Ancona and partly in the archaeological section "From Villanovan to Picenes", on deposit at the Palazzo dei Priori.

- The Roman theatre; scant traces of an amphitheatre also exist. Remains of the city wall, of rectangular blocks of hard limestone, may be seen just outside the Porta S. Francesco; whether the walling under the Casa Porti belongs to them is doubtful. The medieval embattled walls superposed on it are picturesque.
- The cisterns of Fermo are an archaeological site situated on top of the hill, at 310 metres (1,020 ft) above sea level. Fermo boasts one of the most gigantic and well-preserved examples of Roman cisterns in Italy. They were built around the 1st century a.C. The structure is a rectangular construction of about 30 by 70 metres (98 by 230 ft) consisting of 30 underground rooms: they provided water for the city, probably through public fountains. The underground pipe network above the cisterns was connected to a canal around the external walls. From the canal, small pipes brought water into the cisterns: water inlets are still visible inside the rooms. The cisterns are made of Opus caementicium, which is the waterproofing of old Roman concrete. The level of the water inside the rooms was about 70 centimetres (28 in) and the total amount of water inside was about 3,000 cubic metres (110,000 cu ft).

=== Natural areas ===
Forest of Cugnolo, near Torre di Palme: located in the homonymous district, is a rare example of intact Mediterranean maquis of the Adriatic coast. It extends for about 5 hectares (12 acres), and it is one of the Protected Floristic Areas of the Marche Region. It can be visited through an equipped path with a ring route that also touches the Grotta degli Amanti and eighteenth-century villas.

=== Secular buildings ===
- Palazzo dei Priori, built between 1296 and 1525, the building is notable for the large metal statue of Pope Sixtus V atop the entrance portal. The palace houses the town's civic art gallery and archaeological collections. The Biblioteca Comunale contains a collection of inscriptions and antiquities.

=== Religious buildings ===
- Fermo Cathedral: Excavations undertaken in 1934–35 under the church's pavement brought to light remains from the age of Antoninus Pius (2nd century AD) and of a Palaeo-Christian basilica dating to the 6th century AD. This had three naves divided into four bays, with a raised presbytery. A mosaic depicts a pair of peacocks, a recurring theme in period religious art. After the destruction of this church by Christian of Mainz in 1176 by order of Frederick Barbarossa, the church was reconstructed in 1227 by Giorgio da Como. It has a Gothic facade made of Istrian stone, divided by light pillars and with a central rose window (1348), a bell tower from the same age, and a side portal. In the vestibule are several tombs, including one from 1366 by Tura da Imola, and also the modern monument to Giuseppe Colucci, a famous writer on the antiquities of Picenum. The interior reflects the late 18th-century reconstruction. The building is now surrounded by a garden. The cathedral own a chasuble which reputedly belonged to Thomas Becket. Becket was killed in 1170 and the chasuble presented to Fermo Cathedral by Bishop Presbitero.
- San Francesco: the church's choir dates to 1240, the rest having been restored in the 17th century.
- San Martino
- San Domenico
- San Michele Arcangelo
- San Rocco
- Chiesa della Pietà
- Santa Maria del Carmine
- San Filippo
- San Zenone
- San Agostino
- Santuario della Madonna del Pianto

== Geography ==
=== Panoramic points ===
From the Girfalco or Girone, the highest point of the hill, there is a wide 180° view towards the coast, to the north towards Macerata and to the south towards Monterubbiano. In particular conditions of visibility, it is possible to see the reliefs of Croatia. Other extraordinary views can be enjoyed from Torre di Palme, a hamlet of Fermo, south of the city and overlooking the sea.

=== Frazioni ===
It counts the hamlets (frazioni) of Camera, Campiglione, Cantagallo, Casabianca, Capodarco, Cartiera di Tenna, Concerie, Contrada Boara, Ete Palazzina, Faleriense, Gabbiano, Girola, Lido di Fermo, Madonnetta d'Ete, Marina Palmense, Moie, Molini Tenna, Montesecco, Montone, Parete, Pompeiana, Ponte Ete Vivo, Sacri Cuori, Salette, Salvano, San Biagio, San Girolamo, San Lorenzo, San Marco, San Michele, Lido San Tommaso, Torre di Palme and Villa San Claudio.

=== Climate ===
According to the Köppen climate classification, Fermo experiences a humid subtropical climate (Cfa).

== Twin towns ==
- Berat, Albania
- Bahía Blanca, Argentina
- Ansbach, Germany, since 2006
- León, Mexico

== Notable people ==
- Blessed John of Fermo (1259–1322)
- Decio Azzolino (1623–1689), cardinal
- Melissa Bellucci (born 2001), Footballer (Midfield, Juventus)
- Marcellino da Capradosso (1873 – 1909), lived and died here, Servant of God
- Francesco Graziani (1828–1901), opera singer
- Lodovico Graziani (1820–1885), opera singer
- Alessandro Maggiori (1764–1834), art collector
- Savino Monelli (1784–1836), opera singer
- Augusto Murri (1841–1932), physician

== See also ==
- Roman Catholic Archdiocese of Fermo
